= Washington's 10th congressional district =

U.S. House district for Washington

Coordinates: 47°00′N 122°50′W

- Interactive map of district boundaries since January 3, 2023
- Representative: Marilyn Strickland; D–Tacoma
- Area: 827 mi^{2} (2,140 km^{2})
- Distribution: 92.0% urban; 8.0% rural
- Population (2025): 793,376
- Median household income: $102,445
- Ethnicity: 60.1% White; 12.9% Hispanic; 8.8% Two or more races; 7.6% Asian; 6.7% Black; 2.1% Pacific Islander Americans; 1.1% Native American; 0.6% other
- Cook PVI: D+9

Washington's 10th congressional district is a congressional district in western Washington. The district is centered on the state capital, Olympia, and includes portions of Thurston and Pierce counties (including parts of Tacoma). It was created after the 2010 United States census, which granted Washington an additional congressional seat, bringing the number of seats apportioned to the state up from 9 to 10, and elected Denny Heck as its first member to the United States House of Representatives in the 2012 elections. Marilyn Strickland was elected in 2020 to replace him after he retired to run for Lieutenant Governor.

== Redistricting 2011-2012 ==
By Washington state law, a non-partisan commission composed of two Republicans, two Democrats, and a non-voting chairperson drew the boundaries for this new district, as well as the new boundaries for Washington's existing districts. The Washington Redistricting Commission was tasked with drawing the maps for congressional and legislative districts in the year after each census, including the new 10th congressional district. The first commissioners' maps were released on September 13, 2011. In addition, several third party maps were submitted to the commissioners by citizens and advocacy groups.

=== Commissioner Tim Ceis ===
Commissioner Ceis, representing the Senate Democratic leadership, submitted a draft plan that would place the new 10th district in SW Pierce, northern Thurston, eastern Mason, and far southern King counties. It would include the cities of Shelton, Olympia, Fircrest, Pacific, Fife, Puyallup, and part of Tacoma. Federal Way, Auburn, Bonney Lake, Orting, Yelm, and McCleary were just outside the borders of the proposed 10th district. This proposed 10th district voted for Democrat Patty Murray over Republican Dino Rossi about 53.7/46.3 in the 2010 Senate Election, and is around 68.3% white.

=== Commissioner Slade Gorton ===
Commissioner Gorton, representing the Senate Republican leadership, submitted a draft plan placing the new 10th district across the northern part of the state, straddling the Cascade mountains to take in Island, San Juan, Whatcom, Skagit, Chelan, Douglas, Okanogan, northern and eastern parts of Snohmish county, and the city of Skykomish in King county. It would have included the cities of Bellingham, Granite Falls, Arlington, Monroe, Wenatchee, Iroville, and most of Coulee Dam. Grand Coulee, Quincy, Republic, and Marysville were just outside the proposed boundaries. This proposed 10th district voted for Republican Dino Rossi over Democrat Patty Murray about 52.6/47.4, and is 79% white. Gorton's proposal also suggested the possibility of renumbering the congressional districts from west to east, which would mean that district No. 10 would be in the far east of the state, where the existing (pre-2012) 5th district was located.

=== Commissioner Dean Foster ===
Commissioner Foster, representing the House Democratic leadership, submitted a draft plan that would place the new 10th district on the Pacific Coast, Olympic Peninsula, and south Puget Sound, taking in Pacific, Grays Harbor, Clallam, all but the easternmost portion of Jefferson, western Mason, northern Thurston, and southwest Pierce counties. It would include Sequim, Olympia, Fife, Puyallup, Eatonville, and Steilacoom, while excluding Shelton, Port Townsend, Lakewood, Sumner, Orting, Tacoma, and Yelm. This proposed 10th district voted for Democrat Patty Murray over Republican Dino Rossi 51.3/48.7, and is 75.8% white.

=== Commissioner Tom Huff ===
Commissioner Huff, representing the House Republican leadership, submitted a draft plan that would make the new 10th district a majority-minority district, entirely in south King county. It would include, Federal Way, Kent, Newcastle, SeaTac, Des Moines, Pacific, and parts of south Seattle, Auburn, and Burien. This proposed 10th district voted for Democrat Patty Murray over Republican Dino Rossi 63/37, and is 48.8% white, 19.9% Asian, 13.6% Hispanic, 11.9% Black, and 5.9% Native and others.

=== Third-party submissions ===
Several third parties submitted draft plans to the Redistricting Commission for consideration. Of those plans, United for Fair Representation WA / Win-Win Network submitted a plan quite similar to Commissioner Foster's draft proposal for the 10th district. John Milem's submission includes a district that closely matches Commissioner Gorton's draft proposal for the 10th. United for Fair Representation's Unity map proposal also has a district quite similar to the draft proposal from Commissioner Ceis. Van Anderson submitted a proposal that includes a coastal/Olympic peninsula 10th district similar to Commissioner Foster's draft proposal for the 10th district.

=== The Gorton/Ceis compromise ===
At the December 16, 2011 Redistricting Commission meeting, Commissioners Gorton and Ceis were tasked with developing the 2012 congressional district map, while Commissioners Foster and Huff worked on a legislative plan for Eastern Washington. At the December 28 meeting, Commissioners Ceis and Gorton released a proposed congressional map which created a 10th district centered on Olympia including Fort Lewis/McChord Air Field (Joint Base Lewis-McChord facility), McNeil and Anderson islands, the cities of Shelton, Tenino, University Place, Puyallup, Fife, Edgewood, Sumner, most of eastern Tacoma, and the Pierce County portions of Milton and Pacific. The final map of the 10th congressional district did not deviate significantly from the Gorton/Ceis proposal (see next para.). The state legislature will be able to amend the finalized Commission borders by up to 2% of the population with a supermajority vote.

=== Final Commission-approved Plan ===
The Washington Redistricting Commission officially approved a congressional redistricting plan for the approval of the state legislature on January 1, 2012, just before 10 pm, two hours before the statutory deadline. The final congressional plan for the 10th district closely mirrored the Gorton/Ceis proposal, except that the cities of Milton and Pacific were placed entirely in the 8th district, instead of being split at the King/Pierce county line. In compensation for the loss of Milton and Pacific, the dividing line between the 10th and 8th districts was altered to include a larger population between Puyallup and Roy.

== Recent election results from statewide races ==
| Year | Office | Results |
|---|---|---|
| 2008 | President | Obama 58% - 41% |
| 2010 | Senate | Murray 53% - 47% |
| 2012 | President | Obama 58% - 42% |
| 2016 | President | Clinton 52% - 39% |
| 2016 | Senate | Murray 58% - 42% |
| 2016 | Governor | Inslee 53% - 47% |
| 2016 | Lt. Governor | Habib 53% - 47% |
| 2016 | Secretary of State | Wyman 58% - 42% |
| 2016 | Auditor | McCarthy 53% - 47% |
| 2018 | Senate | Cantwell 57% - 43% |
| 2020 | President | Biden 57% - 39% |
| 2020 | Governor | Inslee 55% - 44% |
| 2020 | Secretary of State | Wyman 57% - 43% |
| 2020 | Treasurer | Pellicciotti 53% - 47% |
| 2020 | Auditor | McCarthy 58% - 42% |
| 2020 | Attorney General | Ferguson 56% - 44% |
| 2022 | Senate | Murray 57% - 43% |
| 2022 | Secretary of State (Spec.) | Anderson 50% - 46% |
| 2024 | President | Harris 57% - 39% |
| 2024 | Senate | Cantwell 59% - 41% |
| 2024 | Governor | Ferguson 55% - 45% |
| 2024 | Lt. Governor | Heck 57% - 43% |
| 2024 | Secretary of State | Hobbs 59% - 40% |
| 2024 | Treasurer | Pellicciotti 57% - 43% |
| 2024 | Auditor | McCarthy 59% - 41% |
| 2024 | Attorney General | Brown 56% - 44% |
| 2024 | Commissioner of Public Lands | Upthegrove 53% - 47% |

== Composition ==
For the 118th and successive Congresses (based on redistricting following the 2020 census), the district contains all or portions of the following counties and communities:

Pierce County (31)

Alderton (part; also 8th), Anderson Island, Auburn (part; also 9th; shared with King County), Bonney Lake (part; also 8th), Clover Creek, DuPont, Edgewood, Firecrest, Fort Lewis, Frederickson, Graham (part; also 8th), Ketron Island, Lakewood, McChord AFB, McMillin (part; also 8th), Midland, North Fort Lewis, North Puyallup, Pacific (part; also 9th; shared with King County), Parkland, Puyallup, Roy, South Hill (part; also 8th), Spanaway, Steilacoom, Summit, Summit View, Sumner (part; also 8th), Tacoma (part; also 6th), University Place, Waller

Thurston County (7)

Lacey, Nisqually Indian Community, North Yelm, Olympia, Tanglewilde, Tumwater, Yelm

== List of members representing the district ==
| Member | Party | Term | Cong ress | Electoral history | District location |
|---|---|---|---|---|---|
District established January 3, 2013
| Denny Heck (Olympia) | Democratic | January 3, 2013 – January 3, 2021 | 113th 114th 115th 116th | Elected in 2012. Re-elected in 2014. Re-elected in 2016. Re-elected in 2018. Retired to run for Lieutenant Governor of Washington. | 2013–2023 Parts of Mason, Pierce, and Thurston |
| Marilyn Strickland (Tacoma) | Democratic | January 3, 2021 – present | 117th 118th 119th | Elected in 2020. Re-elected in 2022. Re-elected in 2024. Re-elected in 2026. | 2013–2023 Parts of Mason, Pierce, and Thurston |
| Marilyn Strickland (Tacoma) | Democratic | January 3, 2021 – present | 117th 118th 119th | Elected in 2020. Re-elected in 2022. Re-elected in 2024. Re-elected in 2026. | 2023–present Parts of Pierce and Thurston |

== Recent election results ==
=== 2012 ===
Washington 10th Congressional District - 6 November 2012
| Party | Candidate | Votes | % |
|---|---|---|---|
| Democratic | Denny Heck | 163,036 | 58.6 |
| Republican | Richard (Dick) Muri | 115,381 | 41.4 |
| Total votes | | 278,417 | 100.0 |

=== 2014 ===
Washington's 10th congressional district, 2014
| Party | Candidate | Votes | % |
|---|---|---|---|
| Democratic | Denny Heck (incumbent) | 99,279 | 54.7 |
| Republican | Joyce McDonald | 82,213 | 45.3 |
| Total votes | | 181,492 | 100.0 |
| Democratic hold | | | |

=== 2016 ===
Washington's 10th congressional district, 2016
| Party | Candidate | Votes | % |
|---|---|---|---|
| Democratic | Denny Heck (incumbent) | 170,460 | 58.7 |
| Republican | Jim Postma | 120,104 | 41.3 |
| Total votes | | 290,564 | 100.0 |
| Democratic hold | | | |

=== 2018 ===
Washington's 10th congressional district, 2018
| Party | Candidate | Votes | % |
|---|---|---|---|
| Democratic | Denny Heck (incumbent) | 166,215 | 61.5 |
| Republican | Joseph Brumbles | 103,860 | 38.5 |
| Total votes | | 270,075 | 100.0 |
| Democratic hold | | | |

=== 2020 ===
Washington's 10th congressional district, 2020
| Party | Candidate | Votes | % |
|---|---|---|---|
| Democratic | Marilyn Strickland | 167,937 | 49.33 |
| Democratic | Beth Doglio | 121,040 | 35.56 |
| Write-in | | 51,430 | 15.11 |
| Total votes | | 340,407 | 100.0 |
| Democratic hold | | | |

=== 2022 ===
Washington's 10th congressional district, 2022
| Party | Candidate | Votes | % |
|---|---|---|---|
| Democratic | Marilyn Strickland (incumbent) | 152,544 | 57.0 |
| Republican | Keith Swank | 114,777 | 42.9 |
| Write-in | | 427 | 0.2 |
| Total votes | | 267,748 | 100.0 |
| Democratic hold | | | |

=== 2024 ===
Washington's 10th congressional district, 2024
| Party | Candidate | Votes | % |
|---|---|---|---|
| Democratic | Marilyn Strickland (incumbent) | 203,732 | 58.5 |
| Republican | Don Hewett | 143,492 | 41.2 |
| Write-in | | 820 | 0.2 |
| Total votes | | 348,044 | 100.0 |
| Democratic hold | | | |

== See also ==
- United States House of Representatives elections in Washington, 2012
