= Pierce County Council =

Legislative body of Pierce County, Washington, US

- Pierce County, Washington

Type
- Type: County Council of the Pierce County, Washington

Leadership
- Chair: Jani Hitchen (D)

Structure
- Seats: 7
- Political groups: Democratic Party (4); Republican Party (3)
- Length of term: 4 years

Elections
- Last election: November 3, 2026

Meeting place
- 1501 Market Street Tacoma, Washington

Website
- Pierce County Council

The Pierce County Council is a county legislative council with jurisdiction over Pierce County, Washington. In addition to serving as the legislative branch of the county's government, the council is responsible for managing the Pierce County Sheriff's Office, public health and human services, public transportation (including the Pierce County Airport), wastewater management, parks, open space, trails, records, elections, and licensing.

The council also has the ability to fill vacancies in the Washington House of Representatives and Washington State Senate.

== Structure ==
The Pierce County Council has seven members who are elected in partisan elections to four-year terms. Each member represents a geographically contiguous district that includes approximately 131,500 residents. When a vacancy occurs, the local county parties nominate three candidates, one of whom is selected by the County Council.

== Members ==
Pierce County Council Members
District	Councilmember	Party	Areas represented
1	Dave Morell	Republican	Bonney Lake, Buckley, Carbonado, Crystal Mountain, Greenwater, Lake Tapps, Orting, South Hill, South Prairie, Wilkeson
2	Paul Herrera	Republican	Puyallup, Sumner, Fife, Milton, Pacific, Edgewood, Northeast Tacoma, Southeast Auburn, Browns Point, Dash Point
3	Amy Cruver	Republican	Ashford, Eatonville, Elbe, Elk Plain, Frederickson, Graham, Spanaway, Roy, McKenna, Harts Lake
4	Rosie Ayala	Democratic	Fircrest, parts of North Tacoma, South Tacoma, Hilltop, Downtown Tacoma, Port of Tacoma, University Place
5	Bryan Yambe	Democratic	Midland, North Clover Creek, Parkland, Spanaway, Summit View, Summit, Waller, East Tacoma, South Tacoma
6	Jani Hitchen	Democratic	Anderson Island, Ketron Island, Steilacoom, Joint Base Lewis–McChord, DuPont, Lakewood, Parkland
7	Robyn Denson	Democratic	Gig Harbor, Key Peninsula, North Tacoma, West Tacoma
