= Wilkeson Community House =

- U.S. National Register of Historic Places
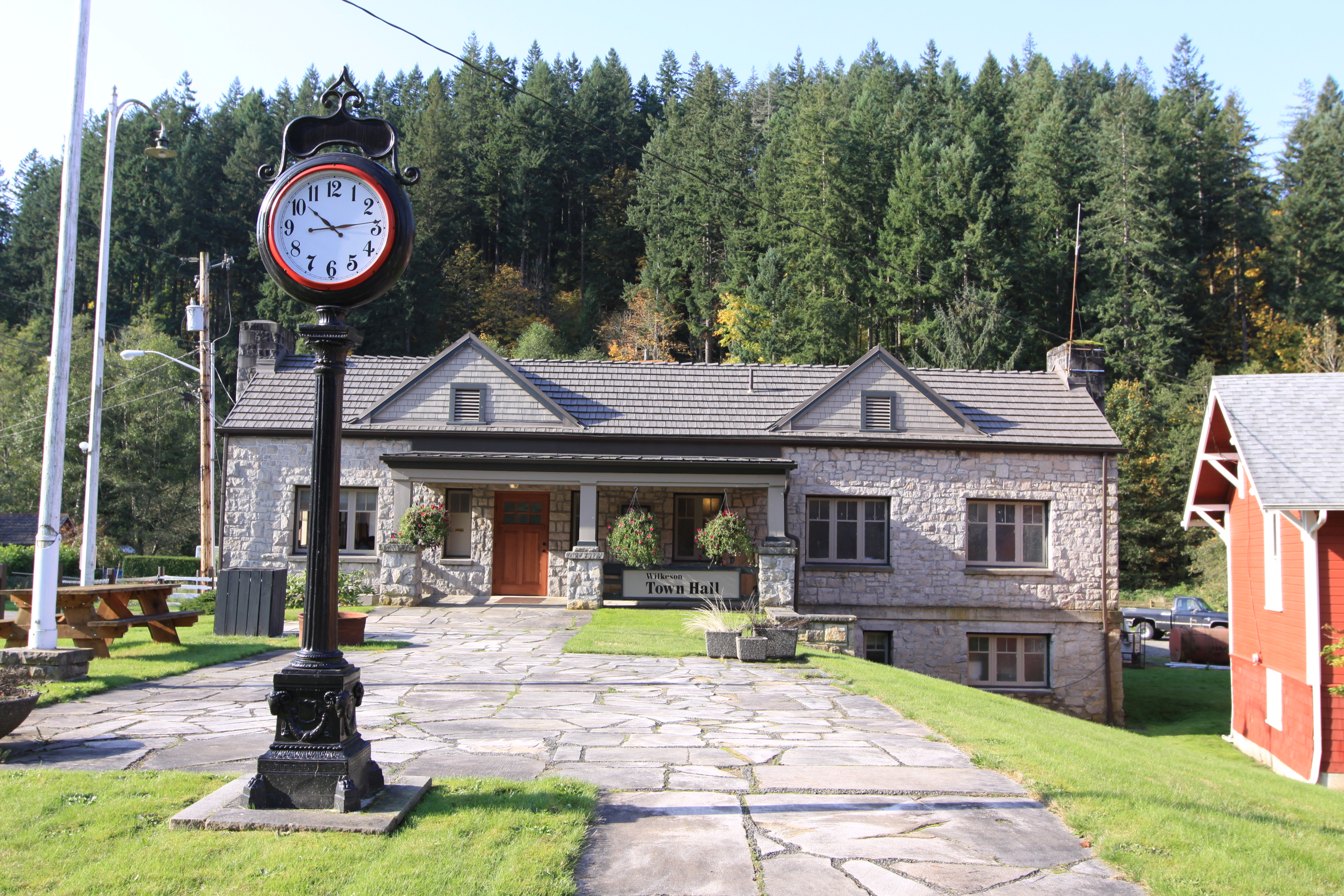
- Wilkeson Town Hall

- Location within Washington (state) Location within the United States
- Location: 540 Church St., Wilkeson, Washington
- Area: less than one acre
- Built: 1923
- Architectural style: Bungalow/craftsman
- NRHP reference No.: 13000507
- Added to NRHP: July 17, 2013

The Wilkeson Community House, also known as Wilkeson Town Hall, is a town hall building in the community of Wilkeson, Washington, United States. It was built in 1923 and served several functions during the town's growth and development, particularly the needs of European immigrants. It is listed on the National Register of Historic Places.

== History ==
Wilkeson was created after the discovery of coal in 1862. After Samuel Wilkeson's survey for the Northern Pacific Railroad (1869), the potential of the local deposits of coal and sandstone were realized. Coal mining began in 1873 and in 1877 the Northern Pacific Railroad built a branch line from Tacoma. Quickly, east Pierce County's Carbon River coal district had many small mining communities. They included Pittsburg, Carbonado, South Prairie, Fairfax, Manely-Morre, Melmont, Montezuma, Morristown, Wingate, Burnett and Wilkeson.

== Appearance ==
The Wilkeson Community House is in the middle of the business district of Wilkeson, Washington. It sits on the west side of Church Street/SR 165 facing east. It is set back from the road by a lawn enclosed by a saw blade fence on the east and south sides. Wood posts separate five horizontal rows of used stone cutting blades. The lawn is flat, tapering off in the back to allow daylight to reach the lower story. A stone pathway leads from the building to Church Street and a side parking lot. Located on the front lawn is a non-historic street clock and flagpole.

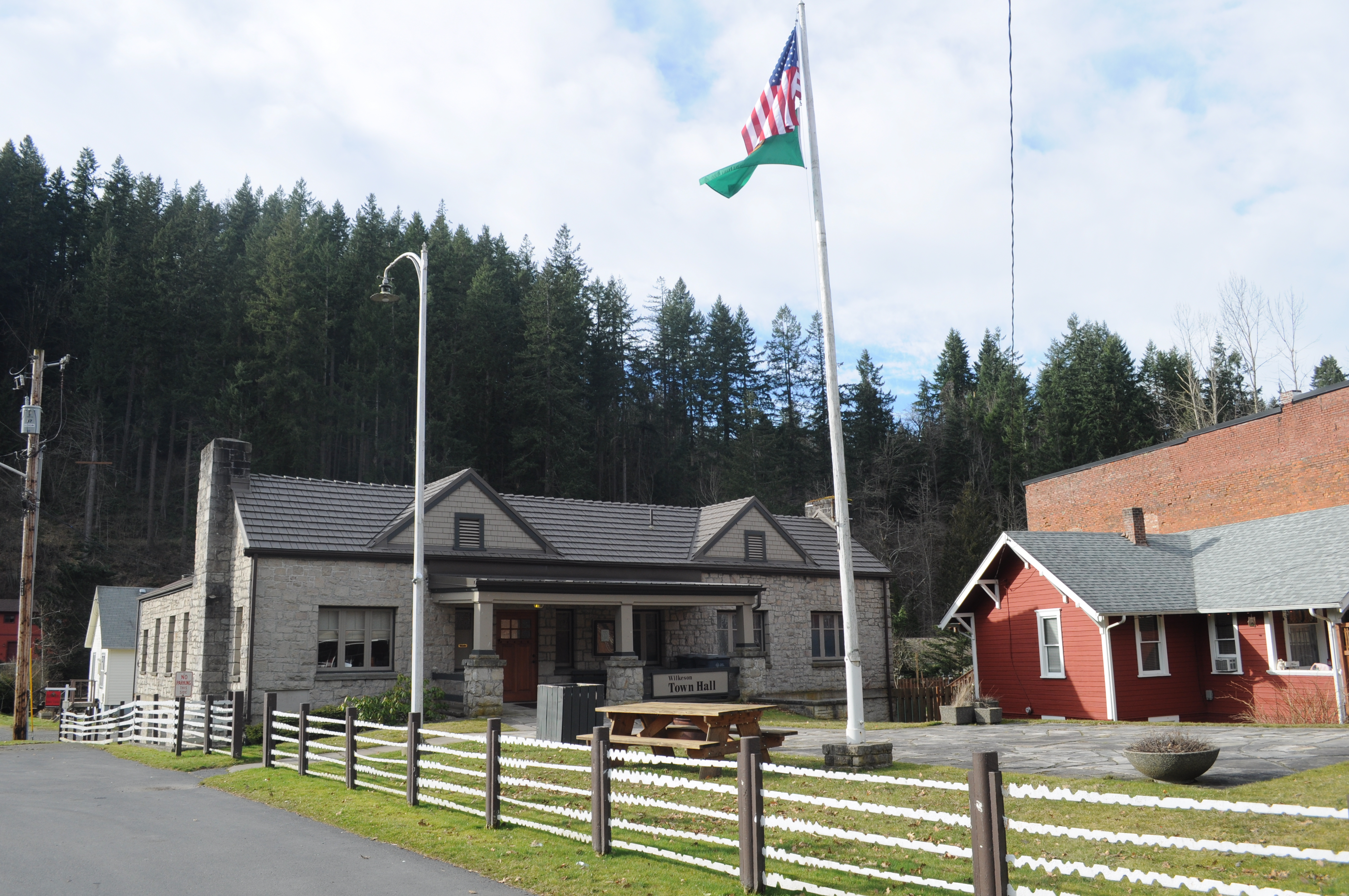
Wilkeson Town Hall and saw blade fence

The Community House is an L-shaped stone building with a stick built infill on the southwest corner. The Craftsman style building is built of locally quarried sandstone laid in a random coursed ashlar pattern. A stone water table separates the first floor from the basement. On the east facade the gable roof is covered with metal shingles. The rest of the roof is covered by asphalt shingles. Two gable dormers, with attic vents and coursed cedar shingles, highlight an offset entry shed-roof veranda which is supported by three square columns resting on stone bases. The original entry has been raised to allow for ADA access. The side gable roof in anchored by exterior end chimneys on the north and south facades. Windows are generally casement style grouped in pairs of two or three, although single units are found on either side of the fireplaces and adjacent to the main entry door.

At the northwest corner is the gymnasium. The gymnasium extends 15 feet (4.6 m) from the brick portion of the building. The south face accommodates a wooden garage door.
