= Timothy Burkhart =

American serial killer

- 1987 booking photo
- Born: Timothy Ray Burkhart; 1966; Parkland, Washington, U.S.
- Died: July 2, 2001 (aged 35); Parkland, Washington, U.S.
- Cause of death: Suicide by drug overdose
- Other name: Kim Burkhard
- Convictions: Various, none for murder

Details
- Victims: 4+
- Span of crimes: 1986–2001
- Country: United States
- State: Washington

Timothy Ray Burkhart (1966 – July 2, 2001) was an American serial killer who killed at least two teenage girls and two women in Pierce County, Washington from 1986 to 2001. He committed suicide shortly after being identified as the prime suspect in the latter murders, and was linked via DNA to the first two murders eight years after his death.

== Murders ==
=== Denise Sallee ===
On January 24, 1986, 17-year-old Denise 'Denny' Sallee, a high school dropout who worked at a fast food restaurant in Spanaway, went to the Paradise Village Bowl bowling alley in Parkland with a friend. The pair played until the friend eventually left, leaving Sallee behind. However, she failed to call her mother and was reported missing the following day, with authorities initially treating her case as that of a runaway.

On March 26, a man cleaning a vacant lot found some clothes stuffed under a log, followed by another discovery three days later, when a 7-year-old boy looking for bottles found a nude, decomposing corpse in the woods near his parents' backyard. The victim had been evidently strangled and partially buried. After news spread about this finding, the man who found the clothes handed them over to the police, which were later identified as belonging to Sallee by her mother. As part of the initial investigation, detectives questioned Sallee's friend about what had happened on the night of her disappearance, with the friend claiming that she had seen Sallee in the company of a young white man who called himself "Tim". After providing a detailed description of the man, a facial composite was released to the media and lead to numerous tips – at least three of which named Burkhart, but all had spelled his name incorrectly. Authorities then briefly considered that she might have fallen victim to then-unidentified Green River Killer, but this was quickly ruled out and the case eventually went cold.

=== Kimberly Payne ===
On October 6, three kids playing at a gravel pit near Parkland found the body of 16-year-old Kimberly Ann Payne, a runaway who was last seen going to the Paradise Village Bowl. Within days of her body's discovery, police received a tip that the teenager had been in the company of a man named "Kim Burkhard", but as there were no follow-up leads and she was also ruled out as a potential Green River victim, this case also went cold.

=== Kathryn Coates ===
On June 13, 2001, 72-year-old housewife Kathryn Coates was bludgeoned to death in the backyard of her home in Summit, in what appeared to be a botched burglary attempt. Her body was found by her husband, who had gone out to do an errand at the time of the crime. Aside from witness testimony claiming that a stranger had been wandering the area, police had no leads and released a composite sketch of the mysterious stranger.

=== Rebecca Nash ===
Two weeks later, a friend went to the Tacoma apartment of 48-year-old Rebecca Nash, an employee of a water delivery company based in Kent. To her shock, she found Nash dead on the floor, with her apartment burglarized and her car, a 1990 Chevrolet Cavalier, apparently stolen. The car was found on the following day parked about a mile away at the Park Village Apartments, but there was no sign of the perpetrator.

== Identification and suicide ==
While investigating the two homicides, the local Crime Stoppers received a tip from a relative of Burkhart who claimed that he resembled the composite sketches and allegedly was near the two crime scenes on the dates when they were committed. While authorities failed to locate Burkhart himself, they identified several locations he was known to frequent and decided to inspect them. In one of these locations, they checked a storage locker and found blood-stained clothes, a television set and a VCR, the latter of which had been stolen from Nash's apartment. Further investigation revealead that Burkhart had also pawned a ring that belonged to Nash under his real name.

Feeling that this was sufficient evidence to charge him, authorities issued a warrant for his arrest and released his name to the media. Just hours later, however, a man who went to check a relative's apartment in Parkland found Burkhart's body in the bathroom. He had died of an apparent drug overdose, and a suicide note was found next to his body, but the contents of said note have never been publicly released. Testing on the body identified traces of blood belonging to Coates, leading investigators to conclude that he had been responsible for both murders. The cases were officially closed, and Burkhart's body was cremated shortly afterwards.

=== Link to Sallee and Payne ===
In April 2009, Gene Miller, a detective who worked at the Tacoma Police Department, started organizing the county's cold cases and eventually came across the unsolved murders of Sallee and Payne. Initially believing they might be related to the murders of two other teenage girls (Michella Welch and Jennifer Bastian), he delved deeper into the cases and took note of a name that kept coming up in the original reports, but with different spellings. He then ran the name through a software program that identified similar sounding names, which eventually gave him the name Timothy Ray Burkhart. Miller then started digging into Burkhart's past, uncovering that he had been suspected in an attempted kidnapping in Parkland in 1984, but was never charged, and that he was responsible for the murders of two women in 2001.

Because of this, he applied to have DNA evidence from the two cases be entered into CODIS in the hope they would be a potential match to Burkhart. To his relief, the results positively connected Burkhart's and the killer's DNA, meaning that he was likely the perpetrator in both killings. Since his identification, investigators have suggested that he might be responsible for additional unsolved cases both in and outside of Pierce County, but as of March 2025, none have been linked back to Burkhart. The Welch and Bastian murders were later solved and proved to be committed by separate offenders.

== See also ==
- List of serial killers in the United States
