= Tacoma–Pierce County Health Department =

Public health department in Washington, US

Agency overview
- Formed: 1972
- Agency executive: Anthony L-T Chen, Director of Health
- Website: tpchd.org

The Tacoma–Pierce County Health Department (TPCHD) is a public health department serving Tacoma and Pierce County in the U.S. state of Washington. It was formed by the city government of Tacoma and Pierce County through an interlocal agreement signed in 1972. The agency has approximately 270 employees and an annual budget of $79.1 million.

An attempt in December 2020 to dissolve the joint health department and create a county-only equivalent during the COVID-19 pandemic was considered by the Pierce County Council amid public outcry and criticism. Under the county ordinance, the interlocal agreement would be dissolved in late 2022, following a transition process. Governor Jay Inslee had issued a proclamation to halt the termination of local health departments during the COVID-19 pandemic under his emergency powers in response to the plan. The county council's vote was tied 3–3 after one member abstained; the ordinance's sponsor, councilmember Pam Roach, also voted no after public testimony.

The county council passed a sales tax increase later that month to fund behavioral health services, following criticism for the lack of programs similar to neighboring counties. Pierce County was the last remaining large county in Western Washington to adopt the measure.
