= Leschi =

Leschi can refer to:

- Chief Leschi, Chief of the Nisqually tribe of Native Americans
- Leschi, Seattle, Washington, neighborhood of Seattle, Washington
- Chief Leschi School, tribal school in the Puyallup Valley near Mount Rainier in Washington
- Leschi (steam ferry), a steam ferry that operated on Lake Washington from 1913 to 1950, and afterwards on Puget Sound until 1967
- Leschi (fireboat)
