= Summit View, Washington =

- CDP
- Location within Washington (state)
- Coordinates: 47°07′44″N 122°20′48″W
- Country: United States
- State: Washington
- County: Pierce County, Washington

Area
  - Total: 3.2 sq mi (8.4 km^{2})
  - Land: 3.24 sq mi (8.4 km^{2})
- Elevation: 463 ft (141 m)

Population (2020)
  - Total: 9,758
  - Density: 3,016.4/sq mi (1,164.6/km^{2})
- Time zone: Pacific
- Area code: 253
- GNIS feature ID: 2585043

Summit View is a census-designated place (CDP) located in Pierce County, Washington.

As of the 2020 census, Summit View had a population of 9,758.

== Demographics ==
Historical population
Census	Pop.	Note	%±
2010	7,236		—
2020	9,758		34.9%
U.S. Decennial Census; 2000 2010

Summit View first appeared as a census designated place in the 2010 U.S. census (formed from part of South Hill CDP and additional area.

=== Racial and ethnic composition ===
Summit View CDP, Washington – Racial and ethnic composition Note: the US Census treats Hispanic/Latino as an ethnic category. This table excludes Latinos from the racial categories and assigns them to a separate category. Hispanics/Latinos may be of any race.
Race / Ethnicity (NH = Non-Hispanic)	Pop 2010	Pop 2020	% 2010	% 2020
White alone (NH)	5,106	5,554	70.56%	56.92%
Black or African American alone (NH)	393	809	5.43%	8.29%
Native American or Alaska Native alone (NH)	75	86	1.04%	0.88%
Asian alone (NH)	458	774	6.33%	7.93%
Native Hawaiian or Pacific Islander alone (NH)	110	276	1.52%	2.83%
Other race alone (NH)	10	45	0.14%	0.46%
Mixed race or Multiracial (NH)	435	1,029	6.01%	10.55%
Hispanic or Latino (any race)	649	1,185	8.97%	12.14%
Total	7,236	9,758	100.00%	100.00%

=== 2020 census ===
In 2020, it had a population of 9,758 inhabitants.

== Geography ==
Summit View is located at coordinates 47°8'11"N 122°21'7"W.

== Education ==
Two school districts include portions of Summit View: Franklin Pierce School District, and Puyallup School District.

Most of the Franklin Pierce portion of Summit View is zoned to Collins Elementary School in Clover Creek, while a portion is zoned to Central Avenue Elementary in Summit. All of the Franklin Pierce portions is zoned to Morris E. Ford Middle School in Midland and Franklin Pierce High School in Clover Creek.
