= Lewis Bush =

American football player (1969–2011)

No. 58, 51, 56
- Position: Linebacker

Personal information
- Born: December 2, 1969; Atlanta, Georgia, U.S.
- Died: December 8, 2011 (aged 42); Tucson, Arizona, U.S.
- Listed height: 6 ft 2 in (1.88 m)
- Listed weight: 245 lb (111 kg)

Career information
- High school: Washington (Parkland, Washington)
- College: Washington State
- NFL draft: 1993: 4th round, 99th overall pick

Career history
- San Diego Chargers (1993–1999); Kansas City Chiefs (2000–2002)

Career NFL statistics
- Tackles: 334
- Sacks: 4
- Interceptions: 2
- Stats at Pro Football Reference

Lewis Fitzgerald Bush (December 2, 1969 – December 8, 2011) was an American professional football linebacker in the National Football League (NFL). He played college football for the Washington State Cougars.

== Early life ==
Bush prepped at Washington High School in Tacoma, Washington.

== College career ==
Bush played college football at Washington State University in Pullman, from 1988 through 1992.

== Professional career ==
Bush was selected by the San Diego Chargers in the fourth round (99th overall) of the 1993 NFL draft. He played in the NFL for ten seasons, seven with the Chargers and three with the Kansas City Chiefs.

== Post-career ==
Bush was a pre-game commentator for San Diego Chargers radio broadcasts on KIOZ, and also worked as an Enrollment Advisor for Ashford University in 2009.

Bush died of a heart attack at age 42 in late 2011.
