= Washington High School (Parkland, Washington) =

Public school in Washington, United States

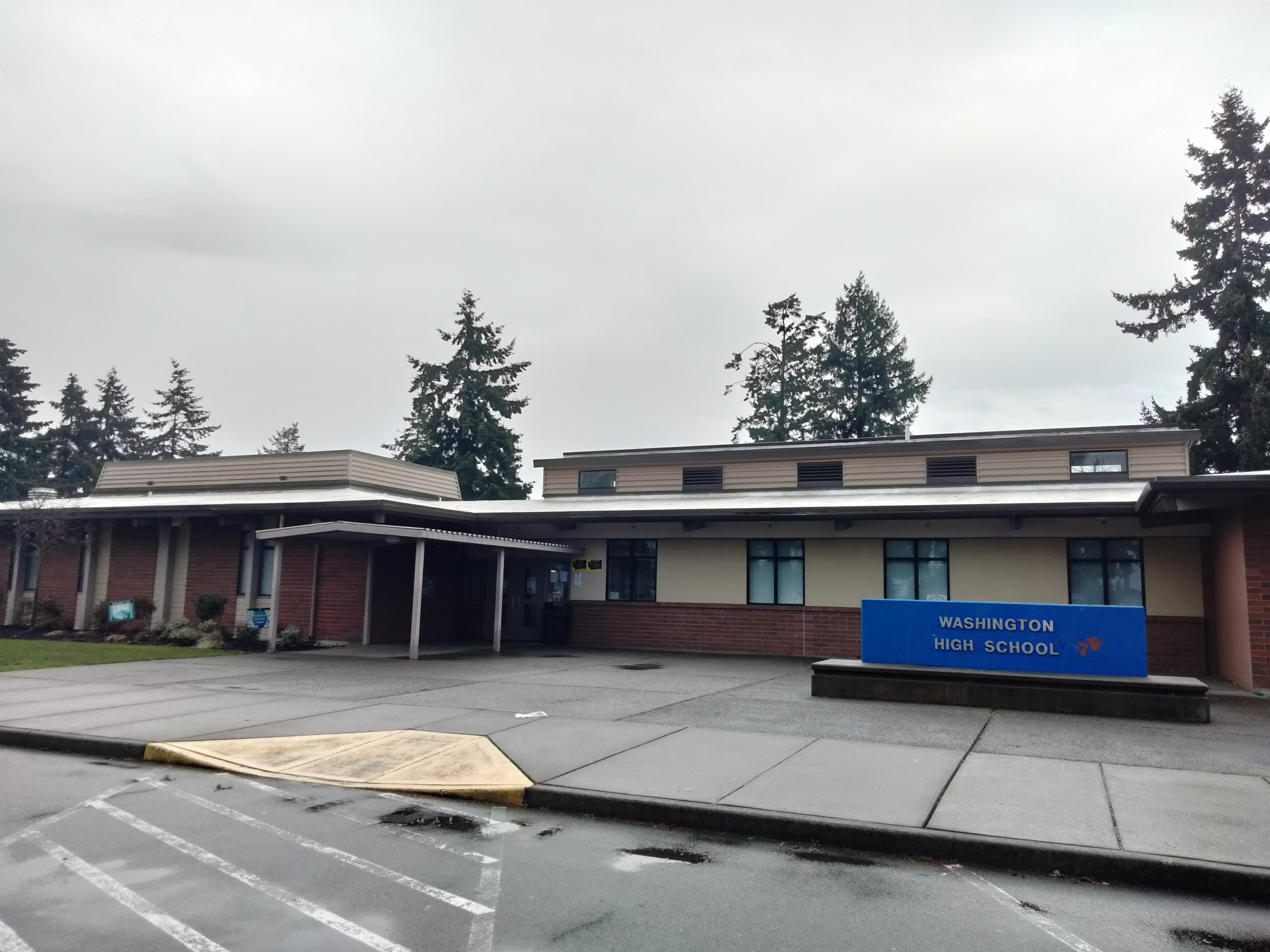

Location
- 12420 Ainsworth Avenue South; Parkland, Washington 98444; United States; 47°08′38″N 122°27′19″W

Information
- Type: Public secondary
- Established: 1969
- School district: Franklin Pierce Schools
- Principal: Kwesi Amoah-Forson
- Teaching staff: 63.83 (on an FTE basis)
- Grades: 9–12
- Enrollment: 1,024 (2022–2023)
- Student to teacher ratio: 16.04
- Campus: Large suburb
- Colors: White, blue and red
- Nickname: Patriots
- Website: washington.fpschools.org

Washington High School is a high school in Parkland, Washington, United States. It serves grades 9 to 12 in the Franklin Pierce Schools.

Its boundary includes most of Parkland and small portions of Tacoma.

== Demographics ==
The demographic breakdown of the 981 students enrolled in 2015–2016 was:

- Male – 52.3%
- Female – 47.6%
- Native American/Alaskan – 0.6%
- Asian/Pacific Islanders – 17.2%
- Black – 16.6%
- Hispanic – 19.6%
- White – 34.4%
- Multiracial – 11.6%

73.5% of the students were eligible for free or reduced-cost lunch. For 2015–2016, Washington was a Title I school.

== Academics ==
As of 2018, 57% of Washington High School students were enrolled in Advanced Placement courses.

== Athletics ==
Sports offered by the school include cross country, cheerleading, track & field, football, golf, volleyball, soccer, basketball, wrestling, tennis, baseball, fastpitch, swimming, and bowling.

== Notable alumni ==
- Q. Allan Brocka
- Lewis Bush
- Demetrious Johnson
