= Melmont, Washington =

Ghost town in Washington (state)

- Ghost town
- Location within Washington (state) Location within the United States
- Country: United States
- State: Washington
- County: Pierce
- Founded: 1900
- Time zone: UTC-8 (Pacific (PST))
  - Summer (DST): UTC-7 (PDT)

Melmont is a ghost town in Pierce County, Washington, USA. The town was founded in 1900 when the Northwest Improvement Company, a subsidiary of Northern Pacific Railway, started the Melmont coal mine. The town consisted of a schoolhouse, a train depot, a saloon, a hotel (which housed the post office, a butcher shop, and store), and rows of cottages that were used as housing for the miners. Each row accommodated a different nationality, the miners being seemingly self-segregated. The coal was used exclusively for use by Northern Pacific, and when they switched from steam locomotives to diesel and electric models, the economic base of the town was destroyed.

== History ==
By 1902, the mine was producing coal to be sent 3 miles (5 km) up the rails to Carbonado, where it was processed. During the sixteen years that the mine was worked, it produced approximately 900,000 tons (750 tons per day) of coal, which accounted for 4% of the total output of Pierce County.

On December 24, 1905, the house of Jack Wilson, then foreman of the mines, was bombed with a load of dynamite placed under the house. The explosion broke all the windows of the house, as well as those in the vicinity. At the time, Wilson and his daughter were sleeping in the house, but were unharmed by the explosion. David Steele, a miner at Melmont, was charged with the explosion, but was acquitted of the charges for lack of evidence.

In 1915, the Melmont Post Office was closed, and mail service to the town was done through Fairfax. The Northwest Improvement Company ceased operating in Melmont in 1918, but a few mines were opened by the Carbon Hill Coal Company, which operated from 1917 to 1919. At some point, the miners had affiliated themselves to the United Mine Workers as local #2963. By the early 1920s, the mines were all closed, and a forest fire destroyed most of what was left of the town. The last resident of Melmont was Andrew Montleon, who lived in the remaining basement of the second schoolhouse.

In 1920, the Melmont schoolhouse (the second one built) was torn down after Steven Poch bought it to use the lumber to build his own home. Today, all that remains of Melmont is part of the foundation of a bridge, a small building used for storing explosives, and the foundation of the schoolhouse.

== Sources ==
- Daniels, Joseph. Mining History of Pierce County, Washington Coal Fields, 1860-1962, Washington Division of Geology and Earth Resources Open File Report OF 79-1.
- Hall, Nancy Irene (1994). Carbon River coal country. Heritage Quest Press. ISBN 0-945433-33-6. OCLC 31829469.
- Ramsey, Guy Reed (1981). Postmarked Washington: Pierce County,
