= Crocker, Washington =

- CDP
- Location within Washington (state)
- Coordinates: 47°05′09″N 122°07′54″W
- Country: United States
- State: Washington
- County: Pierce

Area
  - Total: 2.00 sq mi (5.2 km^{2})
- Elevation: 778 ft (237 m)

Population (2020)
  - Total: 1,450
  - Density: 725/sq mi (280/km^{2})
- Time zone: Pacific
- Area code: 360
- GNIS feature ID: 2584964

Crocker is a census-designated place located in Pierce County, Washington. As of the 2020 census, Crocker had a population of 1,450.

== Demographics ==
Historical population
Census	Pop.	Note	%±
2010	1,268		—
2020	1,450		14.4%
U.S. Decennial Census; 2000 2010

Crocker first appeared as a census designated place in the 2010 U.S. census.

=== Racial and ethnic composition ===
Crocker CDP, Washington – Racial and ethnic composition Note: the US Census treats Hispanic/Latino as an ethnic category. This table excludes Latinos from the racial categories and assigns them to a separate category. Hispanics/Latinos may be of any race.
Race / Ethnicity (NH = Non-Hispanic)	Pop 2010	Pop 2020	% 2010	% 2020
White alone (NH)	1,140	1,208	89.91%	83.31%
Black or African American alone (NH)	5	8	0.39%	0.55%
Native American or Alaska Native alone (NH)	13	14	1.03%	0.97%
Asian alone (NH)	13	12	1.03%	0.83%
Native Hawaiian or Pacific Islander alone (NH)	0	1	0.00%	0.07%
Other race alone (NH)	0	2	0.00%	0.14%
Mixed race or Multiracial (NH)	44	108	3.47%	7.45%
Hispanic or Latino (any race)	53	97	4.18%	6.69%
Total	1,268	1,450	100.00%	100.00%

=== 2010 census ===
In 2010, it had a population of 1,268 inhabitants; 716 male and 552 female.
