= Franklin Pierce High School =

Location
- 11002 18th Ave East; Clover Creek (Tacoma address), Washington 98445; United States
- Coordinates: 47°09′24″N 122°24′26″W

Information
- Type: Public high school
- School district: Franklin Pierce School District
- Superintendent: Lance Goodpaster
- NCES School ID: 530294000475
- Principal: Brixey Marzano
- Teaching staff: 64.05 (FTE)
- Grades: 9-12
- Gender: Co-educational
- Enrollment: 1,138 (2023–2024)
- Student to teacher ratio: 17.77
- Colors: Red, white and gold
- Nickname: Cardinals
- Website: franklinpiercehighschool.fpschools.org

Franklin Pierce High School is a public high school in Clover Creek, Washington (the facility has a Tacoma mailing address). It is named after the fourteenth US President, Franklin Pierce, who was president when the Washington Territory was formed in 1853. It is a part of the Franklin Pierce School District.

== Boundary ==
Communities in the school's attendance boundary include much of Clover Creek, Midland, and Summit as well as portions of Parkland, Summit View, and Waller. It also includes one block of Tacoma.

== Demographics ==
The demographic breakdown of the 1,202 students enrolled in 2018–2019 was:

- Male – 51.7%
- Female – 48.3%
- Native American/Alaskan – 0.4%
- Asian – 9.0%
- Native Hawaiian/Pacific islanders – 3.8%
- Black – 9.1%
- Hispanic – 25.2%
- White – 41.7%
- Multiracial – 10.8%

69.2% of the students were eligible for free or reduced-cost lunch.

== Sports ==
Franklin Pierce competes in the South Puget Sound League. It is classified as a 2A school.

== Notable alumni ==
- Pat Austin, drag racer
- Amber Lancaster, actress
- Sean Osborn, Clarinetist and Composer
- Miesha Tate, UFC Fighter
