= Jessie Kastner =

American legislator and teacher

Jessie Jane Bullock Kastner (August 8, 1873 - June 1, 1957) was a teacher and state legislator in Washington State. She lived in Tacoma and represented Pierce County in the Washington House of Representatives in 1923 and 1924 as a member of the Farmer–Labor Party. She represented the 39th District.

She was born in Eureka, Illinois and studied at Illinois State Normal University's high school department (1895) and its normal department (1896). She received an A.B. degree from the University of Illinois in mathematics and its applications in engineering (1900) as well as an A.M. degree (1906). She also studied at the University of Chicago Graduate School (1907).

She moved to Washington in 1907. She taught at Tacoma High School which became Stadium High School. She married Albert Kastner, a poultry farmer in Tacoma, June 24, 1908

In 1912 she and her husband advertised themselves for sheet metal contractors, skylights, and tar and gravel roofing. She was in Phi Beta Kappa. She was a clubwoman.
