= Lake Tapps =

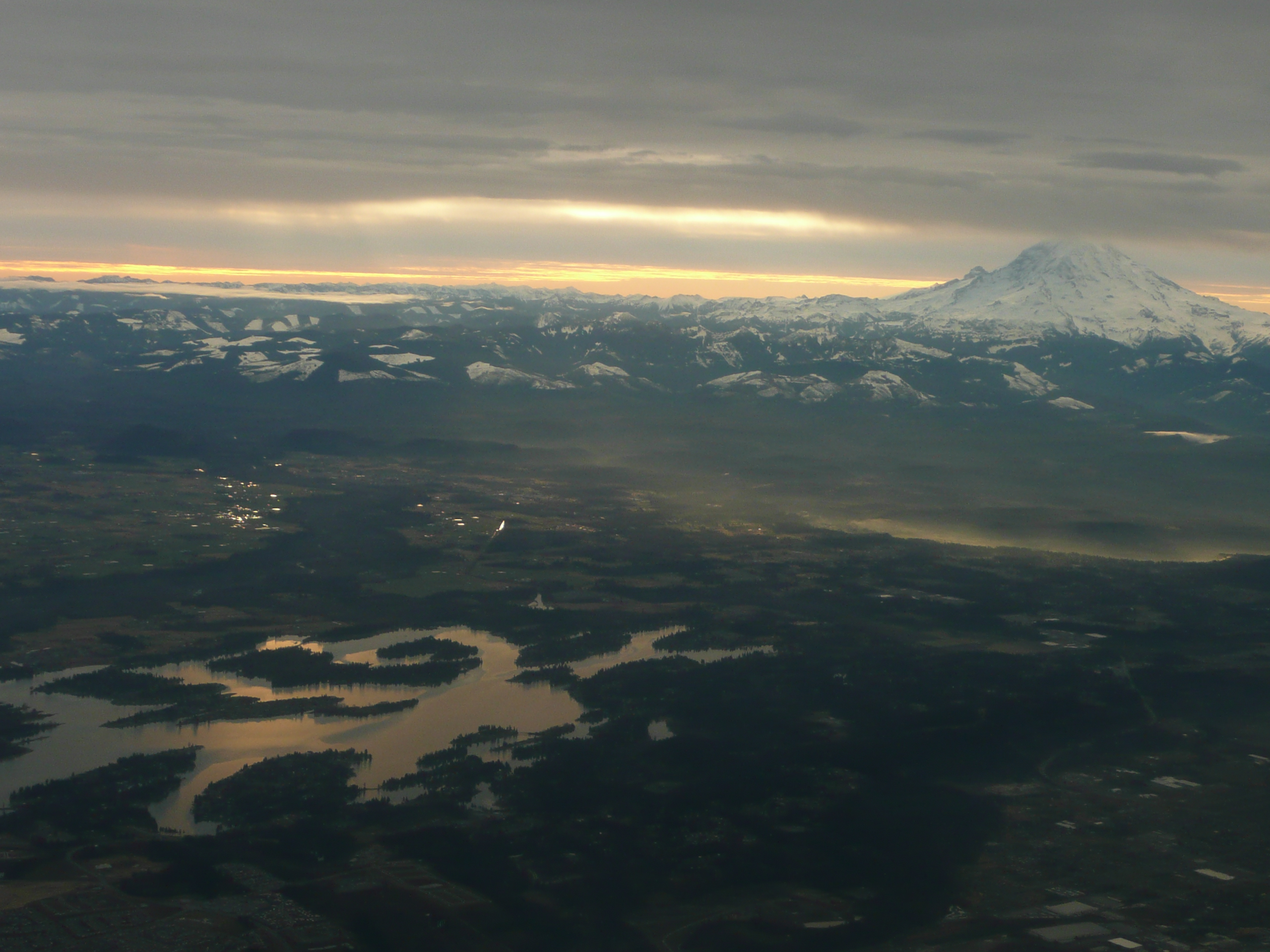

- Location within Washington (state) Location within the United States
- Location: Pierce County, Washington, United States
- Coordinates: 47°13′N 122°10′W
- Type: reservoir
- Basin countries: United States

Lake Tapps is a reservoir in Pierce County, Washington. It was created in 1911 by Puget Sound Power & Light and operated for hydroelectric power until it ceased power production in 2004. The reservoir was sold to the Cascade Water Alliance, a collective of municipalities in King County, to provide drinking water to 350,000 residents and 20,000 businesses.

The lake is open to recreational use through an agreement between Cascade and homeowners on Lake Tapps to maintain certain reservoir levels during the summer. Cascade also has agreements with the Muckleshoot Indian Tribe and the Puyallup Tribe of Indians to ensure instream flows for fish. The level of the reservoir is lowered from about October to April to allow important upkeep and maintenance to be done, as well as an occasional major capital project. The winter lowering of the reservoir levels also ensures the safety of dikes from wind, waves and storms.

Lake Tapps is about 4.5 square miles (12 km^{2}) in surface area and has about 45 miles (72 km) of shoreline. The local terrain is such that the shape of the shoreline is very complex, with many inlets, peninsulas, and islands. Before the reservoir was created there were several smaller lakes, including one called Lake Tapps. The reservoir is held in place by a series of dikes. The reservoir is also known to hold many fish including carp, smallmouth bass, perch, and tiger musky.

A diversion dam on the White River, near Buckley, routes water into a flume which empties into the east side of Lake Tapps. On the west side of the reservoir, water had originally been routed to the Dieringer Powerhouse to generate hydroelectricity, after which the water was returned to the White River, about 20 miles (32 km) downstream from the diversion dam. Although there is no longer power generation, the water is still diverted and returned to the river through the former hydropower infrastructure.

At the diversion structure on the White River the US Army Corps of Engineers began to replace the existing barrier and fish trap. The project began in mid-2018 and is expected to be completed in 2023.

Lake Tapps is primarily in unincorporated Pierce County, with some surrounding areas part of the city of Bonney Lake. At the northern edge of Lake Tapps is Auburn.

== Public access ==
Public access is limited as the shoreline is nearly all developed and access restricted to neighborhood associations. General access is available at the northeastern end at North Lake Tapps Park. The park is owned by Pierce County and open to the public, subject to a daily use fee. The other public access is on the south end at Allan Yorke Park, owned by Bonney Lake.
