= Pierce County, Washington =

County in Washington, United States

- County
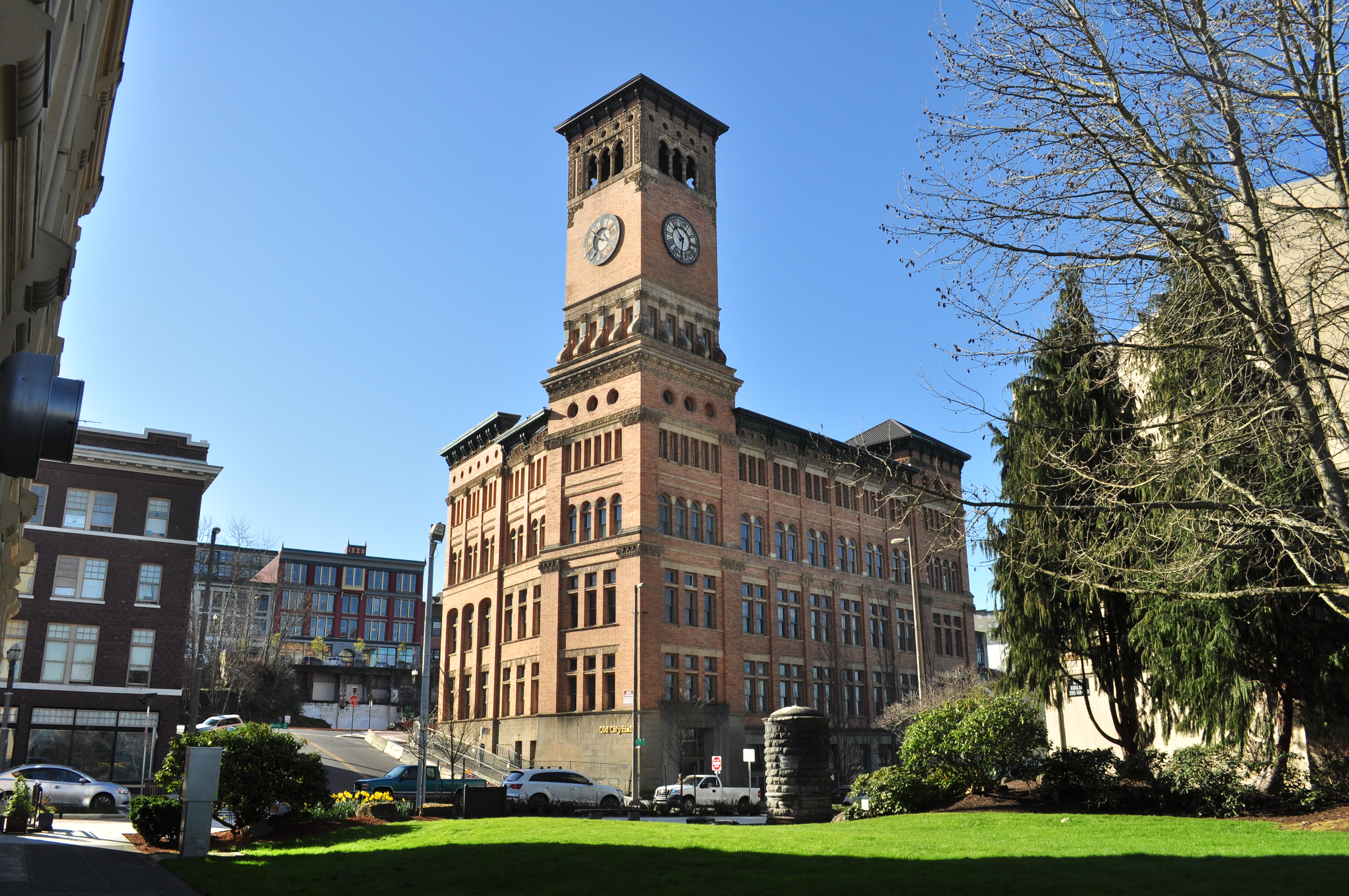
- The Old City Hall in Tacoma

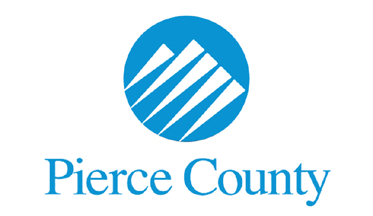
- Flag Seal

- Location within the U.S. state of Washington
- Coordinates: 47.051413°N 122.15324°W
- Country: United States
- State: Washington
- Created: December 22, 1852
- Named for: Franklin Pierce
- Seat: Tacoma
- Largest city: Tacoma

Government
  - County executive: Ryan Mello (D)

Area
  - Total: 1,805.491 sq mi (4,676.20 km^{2})
  - Land: 1,668.025 sq mi (4,320.16 km^{2})
  - Water: 137.466 sq mi (356.04 km^{2}) 7.61%

Population (2020)
  - Total: 921,130
  - Estimate (2025): 946,288 ▲
  - Density: 552.23/sq mi (213.22/km^{2})
- Time zone: UTC−8 (Pacific)
  - Summer (DST): UTC−7 (PDT)
- Area code: 253, 360, 564
- Congressional districts: 6th, 8th, 10th
- Website: piercecountywa.gov

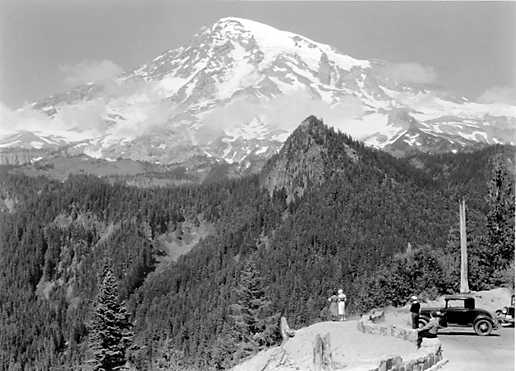
Mount Rainier from Ricksecker Point, 1932

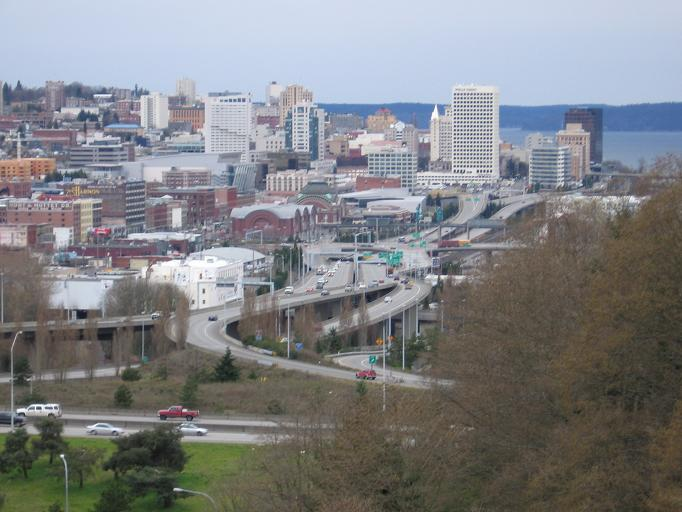
Tacoma—seat of Pierce County

Hazard map of Mount Rainier Lava flows and pyroclastic flows Electron Mudflow-sized event (generally large in size) National Lahar-sized event (generally moderate in size) Lahars not necessarily associated to volcanism (generally small) Flooding after lahar event Potential area of inundation from failure of the Alder Dam County boundary Mount Rainier National Park boundary City

Pierce County is a county in the U.S. state of Washington. As of the 2020 census, the population was 921,130, and was estimated to be 946,288 in 2025, making it the second-most populous county in Washington, behind King County, and the 60th-most populous in the United States. The county seat and largest city is Tacoma, Formed out of Thurston County on December 22, 1852, by the legislature of Oregon Territory, it was named for U.S. President Franklin Pierce. Pierce County is in the Seattle metropolitan area (formally the Seattle–Tacoma–Bellevue, WA, metropolitan statistical area).

Pierce County is home to the volcano Mount Rainier, the tallest mountain in the Cascade Range. Its most recent recorded eruption was between 1820 and 1854. There is no imminent risk of eruption, but geologists expect that the volcano will erupt again. If this should happen, parts of Pierce County and the Puyallup Valley would be at risk from lahars, lava, or pyroclastic flows. The Mount Rainier Volcano Lahar Warning System was established in 1998 to assist in the evacuation of the Puyallup River valley in case of eruption.

== Geography ==
According to the United States Census Bureau, the county has a total area of 1,805.491 square miles (4,676.20 km^{2}), of which 1,668.025 square miles (4,320.16 km^{2}) is land and 137.466 square miles (356.04 km^{2}) (7.61%) is water. It is the 23rd largest county in Washington by total area. The highest natural point in Washington, Mount Rainier, at 14,410 feet (4,390 m), is located in Pierce County. Rainier is locally called Tahoma or Takhoma, both native names for the mountain.

=== Geographic features ===
- Anderson Island
- Carbon River
- Cascade Range
- Case Inlet
- Commencement Bay
- Fox Island
- Herron Island
- Ketron Island
- Key Peninsula
- Lake Tapps
- McNeil Island
- Mount Rainier, highest point in both the county and Washington state.
- Nisqually River
- Puget Sound
- Puyallup River
- Raft Island
- Tacoma Narrows

Pierce County also contains the Clearwater Wilderness area.

=== Adjacent counties ===
- King County – north
- Yakima County – east
- Lewis County – south
- Thurston County – west/southwest
- Mason County – west/northwest
- Kitsap County – north/northwest
- Kittitas County – northeast

=== National protected areas ===
- Mount Baker-Snoqualmie National Forest (part)
- Mount Rainier National Park (part)
- Nisqually National Wildlife Refuge (part)

== Demographics ==
Historical population
Census	Pop.	Note	%±
1860	1,115		—
1870	1,409		26.4%
1880	3,319		135.6%
1890	50,940		1,434.8%
1900	55,515		9.0%
1910	120,812		117.6%
1920	144,127		19.3%
1930	163,842		13.7%
1940	182,081		11.1%
1950	275,876		51.5%
1960	321,590		16.6%
1970	411,027		27.8%
1980	485,643		18.2%
1990	586,203		20.7%
2000	700,820		19.6%
2010	795,225		13.5%
2020	921,130		15.8%
2025 (est.)	946,288	▲	2.7%
U.S. Decennial Census; 1790–1960 1900–1990; 1990–2000 2010–2020

As of the second quarter of 2025, the median home value in Pierce County was $587,138.

Pierce County, Washington – racial and ethnic composition Note: the US Census treats Hispanic/Latino as an ethnic category. This table excludes Latinos from the racial categories and assigns them to a separate category. Hispanics/Latinos may be of any race.
Race / ethnicity (NH = non-Hispanic)	Pop. 1980	Pop. 1990	Pop. 2000	Pop. 2010	Pop. 2020
White alone (NH)	420,011 (86.49%)	488,396 (83.32%)	532,934 (76.04%)	559,160 (70.31%)	569,815 (61.86%)
Black or African American alone (NH)	29,334 (6.04%)	41,105 (7.01%)	47,399 (6.76%)	51,436 (6.47%)	63,059 (6.85%)
Native American or Alaska Native alone (NH)	5,919 (1.22%)	7,725 (1.32%)	9,018 (1.29%)	9,143 (1.15%)	9,642 (1.05%)
Asian alone (NH)	14,622 (3.01%)	27,769 (4.74%)	35,091 (5.01%)	46,520 (5.85%)	62,126 (6.74%)
Pacific Islander alone (NH)	—	—	5,708 (0.81%)	10,205 (1.28%)	18,182 (1.97%)
Other race alone (NH)	2,865 (0.59%)	646 (0.11%)	1,666 (0.24%)	1,415 (0.18%)	5,560 (0.60%)
Mixed race or multiracial (NH)	—	—	30,383 (4.34%)	44,497 (5.60%)	80,935 (8.79%)
Hispanic or Latino (any race)	12,892 (2.65%)	20,562 (3.51%)	38,621 (5.51%)	72,851 (9.16%)	111,811 (12.14%)
Total	485,643 (100.00%)	586,203 (100.00%)	700,820 (100.00%)	795,225 (100.00%)	921,130 (100.00%)

=== 2020 census ===
As of the 2020 census, there were 921,130 people, 339,840 households, and 230,520 families residing in the county. The population density was 552.23 inhabitants per square mile (213.2/km^{2}). There were 359,489 housing units at an average density of 215.52 per square mile (83.2/km^{2}).

Of the 359,489 housing units, 5.5% were vacant. Among occupied housing units, 62.7% were owner-occupied and 37.3% were renter-occupied. The homeowner vacancy rate was 1.0% and the rental vacancy rate was 5.5%.

There were 339,840 households in the county, of which 32.6% had children under the age of 18 living with them and 24.6% had a female householder with no spouse or partner present. About 24.3% of all households were made up of individuals and 9.3% had someone living alone who was 65 years of age or older. The average household size was 2.65 people.

Of the residents, 23.0% were under the age of 18, 6.1% were under the age of 5, and 14.6% were 65 years of age or older; the median age was 36.9 years. The gender makeup was 49.8% female and 50.2% male, which corresponded to 98.6 males for every 100 females overall and 96.9 males for every 100 females age 18 and over. 93.2% of residents lived in urban areas and 6.8% lived in rural areas.

The racial makeup of the county was 64.6% White, 7.2% Black or African American, 1.4% American Indian and Alaska Native, 6.9% Asian, 2.0% Native Hawaiian and Pacific Islander, 5.3% from some other race, and 12.6% from two or more races. Hispanic or Latino residents of any race comprised 12.1% of the population.

=== 2010 census ===
As of the 2010 census, there were 795,225 people, 299,918 households, 202,174 families residing in the county. The population density was 195.07 inhabitants per square mile (75.3/km^{2}). There were 359,489 housing units at an average density of 215.52 per square mile (83.2/km^{2}). The racial makeup of the county was 74.20% White, 6.79% African American, 1.37% Native American, 5.97% Asian, 1.33% Pacific Islander, 3.50% from some other races and 6.83% from two or more races. Hispanic or Latino people of any race were 9.16% of the population.

In terms of ancestry, 20.5% were German, 13.1% were Irish, 10.7% were English, 6.3% were Norwegian, and 4.2% were American.

There were 299,918 households, 35.3% had children under the age of 18 living with them, 49.0% were married couples living together, 13.0% had a female householder with no husband present, 32.6% were non-families, and 25.1% of all households were made up of individuals. The average household size was 2.59 and the average family size was 3.09. The median age was 35.9 years.

The median income for a household in the county was $57,869 and the median income for a family was $68,462. Males had a median income of $50,084 versus $38,696 for females. The per capita income for the county was $27,446. About 8.1% of families and 11.6% of the population were below the poverty line, including 15.0% of those under age 18 and 8.2% of those age 65 or over.

== History ==
The area was originally home to the present-day Nisqually, Puyallup, Squaxin, Steilacoom, and Muckleshoot tribes. The majority of Puyallup villages were situated in proximity to the area that would eventually develop into Tacoma, while Nisqually settlements were primarily located in what is now southern Pierce County. The tribes had two main routes: a northern path traversing Naches Pass and a southern route following the Mashel River, which connected them to Eastern Washington tribes. Trade networks among the region's indigenous peoples were well-established long before the arrival of white settlers.

In 1792 British Captain George Vancouver and his party of explorers came via ship to the shores of the region, and named a number of sites in what would become Pierce County, i.e. Mount Rainier.

In 1832 Fort Nisqually was sited by the British Hudson's Bay Company's chief trader, Archibald McDonald. It was the first permanent European settlement on the Salish Sea. In cooperation with the local indigenous people, a storehouse for blankets, seeds, and potatoes was built at the mouth of Sequalitchew Creek.

In 1839 the Nisqually Methodist Episcopal Mission was established, bringing the first U.S. citizens to settle in the Puget Sound region, near the Sequalitchew Creek canyon.

In 1841 the United States Exploring Expedition set up an observatory on the bluff near the creek to survey, map and chart the waters of Puget Sound.

In 1843 the Second Fort Nisqually was erected. Business became mainly agricultural, and the fort was relocated on a flat-plains area near the banks of Sequalitchew Creek for cattle. The Fort Nisqually property was turned over to American control in 1859.

In 1846 the Oregon Treaty established the 49th Parallel as the boundary between British Canada and the United States, which left what was to become Pierce County on U.S. territory. In response to increasing tensions between Indians and settlers, the United States Army established Fort Steilacoom in 1849 at the site of the traditional home of the Steilacoom Tribe.

In 1850, Captain Lafayette Balch sited his land claim next to the fort and founded Port Steilacoom. In 1854 the town of Steilacoom became Washington Territory's first incorporated town.

In 1854 the Treaty of Medicine Creek was enacted between the United States and the local tribes occupying the lands of the Salish Sea. The tribes listed on the Treaty of Medicine Creek are Nisqually, Puyallup, Steilacoom, Squawskin (Squaxin Island), S'Homamish, Stehchass, T'Peeksin, Squi-aitl, and Sa-heh-wamish. The treaty was signed on December 26, 1854, by Isaac I. Stevens, governor and superintendent of Indian Affairs of Washington territory at the time. The native tribes were told the treaty would help them by paying them for some of the land. It ended up taking prime farmland and relocating the tribes onto rough reservations. Chief Leschi of the Nisqually tribe protested the treaty. He and his people marched to Olympia to have their voices heard but Isaac Stevens ordered them away. When the natives refused to leave, Isaac Stevens would eventually call martial law and—after the beginning of the Puget Sound War in 1855—initiate a search for Chief Leschi in order to arrest him. Chief Leschi was eventually captured and put on trial. The first jury couldn't come to a verdict, so Isaac Stevens had the trial done a second time. This time Leschi was found guilty. Chief Leschi was hanged on February 19, 1858. On December 10, 2004, a historical court convened in Pierce County ruled "as a legal combatant of the Indian War Leschi should not have been held accountable under law for the death of an enemy soldier," thereby exonerating him of any wrongdoing.

== Government ==
The logo often used to depict county government services and departments

Pierce County has adopted and is governed by a Charter. This is allowed by section 4 of Article XI of the Washington State Constitution. The Pierce County Executive, currently Ryan Mello (D), heads the county's executive branch. The Assessor-Treasurer Marty Campbell, auditor Linda Farmer, Prosecuting Attorney Mary Robnett, and Sheriff Keith Swank.

As of 31 December 2023, Pierce County had approximately 3,400 employees and a 2022–2023 biennium general fund budget of $3 billion.

The Pierce County Council is the elected legislative body for Pierce County and consists of seven members elected by district. The council is vested with all law-making power granted by its charter and by the State of Washington, sets county policy through the adoption of ordinances and resolutions, approves the annual budget and directs the use of county funds. The seven members of the County Council are elected from each of seven contiguous and equally populated districts, with each councilmember representing approximately 114,000 county residents. Each county councilmember is elected to serve a four-year term.

- Dave Morell (R), District 1
- Paul Herrera (R), District 2
- Amy Cruver (R), District 3
- Rosie Ayala (D), District 4
- Bryan Yambe (D), District 5
- Jani Hitchen (D), District 6
- Robyn Denson (D), District 7

Beneath the Washington Supreme Court and the Washington Court of Appeals, judicial power rests first in the Pierce County Superior Court, which is divided into 23 departments - each headed by an elected judge, as well as a clerk of the superior court and nine superior court commissioners. Below that is the Pierce County District Court - with eight elected judges, the Tacoma Municipal Court - with three elected judges, and the Pierce County Juvenile Court. Tacoma houses the Pierce County Courthouse.

The people of Pierce County voted on November 5, 1918, to create a Port District. The Port of Tacoma is Pierce County's only Port District. It is governed Port of Tacoma Commission - five Port Commissioners, who are elected at-large countywide and serve four-year terms. The Port of Tacoma owns six container terminals, one grain terminal and an auto import terminal; all of which are leased out to foreign and domestic corporations to operate. In addition, the port owns and operates two breakbulk cargo terminals.

Many charter amendments have been on the ballot in the last five years, but sequential numbering does not carry over from year-to-year.

== Politics ==
Like most of Western Washington, Pierce County is a Democratic-leaning county, though it is more conservative than most other counties in the region. Republicans typically gain over 40% of the vote in presidential elections. Since 1932 the county has only voted Republican in 4 elections, each of which was a national landslide Republican victory. Democratic support lies mainly in Tacoma itself, while much of the southeast part of the county is strongly Republican.

Pierce County is split between three U.S. congressional districts:

- Washington's 6th congressional district includes the city of Tacoma west of Washington State Route 7, Gig Harbor, and the Key Peninsula. The 6th district has been represented since 2025 by Emily Randall, a Democrat.
- Washington's 8th congressional district covers the eastern half of the county, from Bonney Lake east to Mt. Rainier. The 8th district has been represented since 2019 by Kim Schrier, a Democrat.
- Washington's 10th congressional district, contains much of the territory in Pierce County lost by the 9th Congressional district including parts of the city of Tacoma south of I-5 and east of Washington State Route 7, Puyallup, Lakewood, and Joint Base Lewis–McChord. The 10th district is currently represented by Marilyn Strickland, a Democrat and former mayor of Tacoma. Prior to Strickland, the district was represented by Denny Heck, a Democrat who was the first to represent the 10th congressional district after its creation in 2013.

United States presidential election results for Pierce County, Washington
Year	Republican		Democratic		Third party(ies)	
Year	No.	%	No.	%	No.	%
1892	3,954	37.07%	3,621	33.95%	3,090	28.97%
1896	4,651	45.14%	5,570	54.06%	82	0.80%
1900	6,269	59.20%	3,702	34.96%	618	5.84%
1904	9,773	70.63%	2,351	16.99%	1,712	12.37%
1908	10,935	60.84%	4,936	27.46%	2,103	11.70%
1912	6,517	20.59%	6,855	21.65%	18,285	57.76%
1916	16,780	43.28%	18,940	48.85%	3,050	7.87%
1920	22,048	51.89%	8,259	19.44%	12,184	28.67%
1924	21,376	47.70%	4,232	9.44%	19,210	42.86%
1928	35,748	66.02%	17,402	32.14%	996	1.84%
1932	19,006	29.09%	38,451	58.86%	7,870	12.05%
1936	18,331	26.23%	48,988	70.09%	2,572	3.68%
1940	27,188	33.85%	51,670	64.34%	1,453	1.81%
1944	31,626	36.62%	53,269	61.68%	1,475	1.71%
1948	34,396	37.89%	50,674	55.82%	5,716	6.30%
1952	56,515	49.66%	56,132	49.32%	1,164	1.02%
1956	57,078	49.40%	57,728	49.96%	738	0.64%
1960	57,188	46.32%	64,292	52.07%	1,995	1.62%
1964	40,164	31.88%	84,566	67.13%	1,243	0.99%
1968	51,436	37.90%	72,670	53.54%	11,612	8.56%
1972	84,265	56.91%	56,933	38.45%	6,867	4.64%
1976	74,668	46.92%	78,238	49.16%	6,242	3.92%
1980	90,247	51.13%	64,444	36.51%	21,820	12.36%
1984	112,877	57.85%	79,498	40.75%	2,733	1.40%
1988	94,167	48.42%	96,688	49.72%	3,618	1.86%
1992	77,410	32.10%	102,243	42.40%	61,496	25.50%
1996	89,295	37.35%	120,893	50.57%	28,885	12.08%
2000	118,431	44.12%	138,249	51.50%	11,747	4.38%
2004	150,783	48.12%	158,231	50.50%	4,317	1.38%
2008	141,673	42.99%	181,824	55.18%	6,023	1.83%
2012	148,467	43.30%	186,430	54.37%	8,013	2.34%
2016	146,824	40.78%	172,538	47.92%	40,655	11.29%
2020	197,730	42.61%	249,506	53.76%	16,845	3.63%
2024	188,194	42.81%	235,169	53.50%	16,218	3.69%

== Economy ==
The largest public employer in Pierce County is Joint Base Lewis–McChord, which contributes about 60,000 military and civilian jobs. The largest private employers are MultiCare Health System and Virginia Mason Franciscan Health, which operate the two largest hospitals in the county. About a quarter of workers in the county commute to King County for their jobs. As of May 2025, Pierce County had an unemployment rate of 4.7% without adjustments for seasonal labor, up from 4.3% the previous year.

As of 2023, the average annual wage in the county for all industries was $66,977, and the top five employment sectors were:

- Government (58,671)
- Health care and social assistance (54,778)
- Retail trade (36,867)
- Accommodation and food services (29,482)
- Administrative and waste management services (24,768)

Pierce County agriculture has been an instrumental part of the local economy for almost 150 years. However, in the last half-century, much of the county's farmland has been transformed into residential areas. Pierce County has taken aggressive steps to reverse this trend; the county recently created the Pierce County Farm Advisory Commission. This advisory board helps local farmers with the interpretation of land use regulations as well as the promotion of local produce. The creation of the Pierce County Farm Advisory Commission will attempt to save the remaining 48,000 acres of Pierce County farmland. Despite the loss of farmland, Pierce County continues to produce about 50% of the United States' rhubarb.

== Education ==
The following is a list of the public school districts in Pierce County, including those that overlap with other counties:

- Auburn School District
- Bethel School District
- Carbonado School District
- Clover Park School District
- Dieringer School District
- Eatonville School District
- Fife School District
- Franklin Pierce School District
- Orting School District
- Peninsula School District
- Puyallup School District
- Steilacoom Historical School District
- Sumner-Bonney Lake School District
- Tacoma Public Schools
- University Place School District
- White River School District
- Yelm School District

Private schools include the Cascade Christian Schools group, Life Christian School and Academy, Bellarmine, Annie Wright Schools and Charles Wright Academy.

Chief Leschi Schools, affiliated with the Bureau of Indian Education (BIE), is in the county.

=== Higher education ===
The largest institutions of higher education are University of Puget Sound in Tacoma and Pacific Lutheran University in Parkland. Both are religiously affiliated private universities.

Tacoma Community College in Tacoma and Pierce College in Steilacoom are public community colleges. Bates Technical College and Clover Park Technical College are public technical colleges.

Central Washington University has a branch campus in Steilacoom. University of Washington Tacoma is a branch campus of University of Washington.The Evergreen State College also has a campus in Tacoma.

=== Library system ===
Libraries include the Pierce County Library System, the Tacoma Library System, and the Puyallup Public Library.

The Pierce County Library is the fourth largest library system in the state. There are currently 20 branches, including:

- Administrative Center and Library
- Anderson Island
- Bonney Lake
- Buckley
- Dupont
- Eatonville
- Fife
- Gig Harbor
- Graham
- Key Center
- Lakewood
- Milton/Edgewood
- Orting
- Parkland/Spanaway
- South Hill
- Steilacoom
- Summit
- Sumner
- Tillicum
- University Place

The Pierce County Library System currently employs 394 people, and serves 579,970 citizens throughout 1,773 square miles. Established in 1944, the library system serves all of unincorporated Pierce County, as well as annexed cities and towns of: Bonney Lake, Buckley, DuPont, Eatonville, Edgewood, Fife, Gig Harbor, Lakewood, Milton, Orting, South Prairie, Steilacoom, Sumner, University Place and Wilkeson. There are currently more than 1 million physical materials (books, videos, etc.) in the system, and more than 480,000 online or downloadable media items. Total 2016 general fund revenue is estimated at $29,709,541.

== Transportation ==
The Port of Tacoma is the sixth busiest container port in North America and one of the 25 busiest in the world, playing an important part in the local economy. This deep-water port covers 2,400 acres (9.7 km^{2}) and offers a combination of facilities and services including 34 deepwater berths, two million square feet (190,000 m^{2}) of warehouse and office space, and 131 acres (530,000 m^{2}) of industrial yard. An economic impact study showed that more the 28,000 jobs in Pierce County are related to the Port activities.

Two airports designated for general aviation use are in the county: Pierce County Airport (Thun Field) near Puyallup; and Tacoma Narrows Airport near Gig Harbor. Both airports are owned by the county government and also offer flight training and some commercial spaces. In 2024, Thun Field had 107,000 total aircraft movements and Tacoma Narrows had 97,677 aircraft movements. The nearest major commercial airport to Pierce County is Seattle–Tacoma International Airport. A state commission to find sites for a new commercial airport identified two greenfield sites in unincorporated Pierce County for further study in 2023. The proposal, which sought an airport that could handle 20 million annual passengers by 2040, drew public opposition and mixed reactions from local politicians. The commission was dissolved before a final recommendation could be made.

=== Public transit ===
Pierce Transit operates public transportation, including local buses, paratransit, and rideshare, within the county's urban areas. It is funded by a 0.6 percent sales tax levied within its boundaries, which include Tacoma and most cities. The regional Sound Transit system also includes portions of Pierce County. It operates the T Line, a streetcar in Tacoma; Sounder commuter rail service between Seattle, Tacoma, and Lakewood; and several express bus routes. A future Link light rail expansion from Federal Way to Tacoma Dome Station, the county's transit hub, was approved by voters in 2016 and is planned to open in 2035. Intercity Transit, the public transportation agency in Thurston County, has an intercity route that connects Lakewood to Lacey and Olympia. Peninsula Transit, a free shuttle service, launched in 2025 as a two-year pilot program to serve the Key Peninsula after it had lost Pierce Transit service.

Tacoma Dome Station is also served by Amtrak's intercity Cascades and Coast Starlight routes. Amtrak trains were formerly routed along the Puget Sound shoreline between Tacoma and Nisqually until 2021, when the Point Defiance Bypass was fully opened to passenger traffic. A train derailment on December 18, 2017, on the corridor closed it to use for several years; the accident killed three passengers and injured dozens of people.

=== Major highways ===
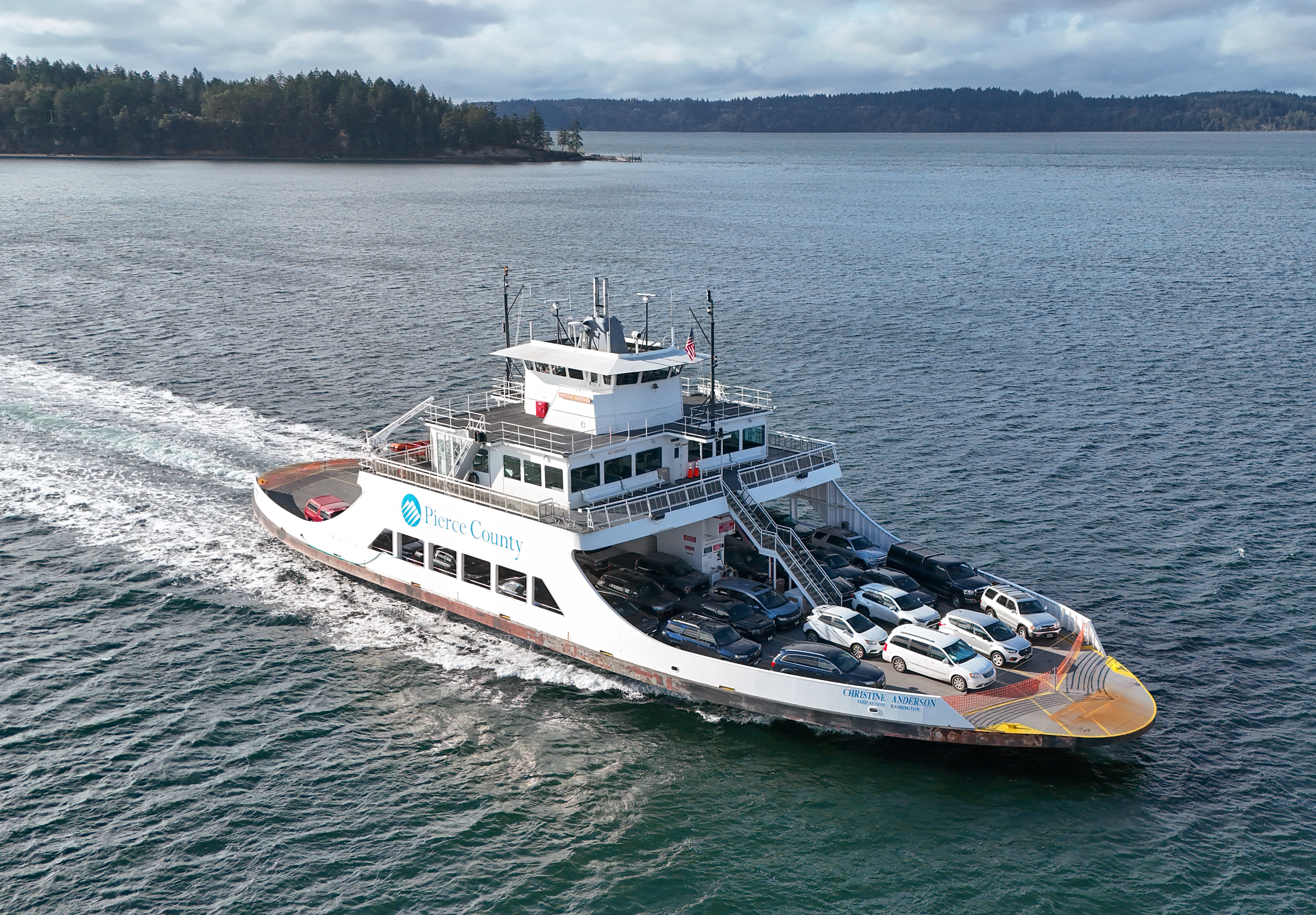
Pierce County operates ferries to Anderson Island and Ketron Island

- Interstate 5, a major regional freeway
- Interstate 705, a short connector in Tacoma
- State Route 7
- State Route 16, a freeway that uses the Tacoma Narrows Bridge
- State Route 99
- State Route 167
- State Route 410
- State Route 512
- State Route 509

=== Ferry routes ===
- Point Defiance–Tahlequah ferry (operated by Washington State Ferries)
- Steilacoom–Anderson Island ferry (operated by Pierce County)

== Arts and culture ==
Pierce County is home to a diverse array of arts organizations, including the Broadway Center for the Performing Arts, Grand Cinema, Lakewood Playhouse, Museum of Glass, Northwest Sinfonietta, Speakeasy Arts Cooperative, Tacoma Art Museum, Tacoma Little Theater, Tacoma Concert Band, Tacoma Musical Playhouse, Tacoma Opera, Symphony Tacoma, Dance Theater Northwest, Washington State History Museum, and others. The city of Tacoma hosts an annual event called "Art at Work" month every November, promoting participation in and support for the local arts community. ArtsFund, a regional United Arts Fund, has assisted the arts community in Pierce County. In 2012, LeMay-America's Car Museum opened its doors in Tacoma. Additionally, the Karpeles Manuscript Library Museum, houses a large collection of original manuscripts and documents.

The Pierce County Daffodil Festival and Parade is held annually in April. The Washington State Fair is held every September in Puyallup.

== Law enforcement ==
The Pierce County Sheriff's Department was founded in 1853, shortly after incorporation of the county.

Pierce County was noted for gangs, drugs, and criminal activity starting in the mid to late 1980s. Tacoma's Hilltop neighborhood had gangs that were selling crack cocaine and gang violence. Increased police patrols and community watch programs led to reduced crime in the mid to late 2000s. As of 2006, 38% of the methamphetamine labs (138 sites) cleaned up by the Washington State Department of Ecology were in Pierce County. This reduction from a high of 589 labs in 2001 comes in part to a new law restricting the sale of pseudoephedrine and in part due to tougher prison sentences for methamphetamine producers.

== Communities ==
=== Cities ===
- Auburn (partial)
- Bonney Lake
- Buckley
- DuPont
- Edgewood
- Enumclaw (partial)
- Fife
- Fircrest
- Gig Harbor
- Lakewood
- Milton (partial)
- Orting
- Pacific (partial)
- Puyallup
- Roy
- Ruston
- Sumner
- Tacoma (county seat)
- University Place

=== Towns ===
- Carbonado
- Eatonville
- South Prairie
- Steilacoom
- Wilkeson

=== Census-designated places ===
- Alder
- Alderton
- Anderson Island
- Artondale
- Ashford
- Browns Point
- Canterwood
- Clear Lake
- Clover Creek
- Crocker
- Dash Point
- Elbe
- Elk Plain
- Fife Heights
- Fort Lewis
- Fox Island
- Frederickson
- Graham
- Greenwater
- Herron Island
- Home
- Kapowsin
- Ketron Island
- Key Center
- La Grande
- Lake Tapps
- Longbranch
- Maplewood
- McChord AFB
- McKenna
- McMillin
- Midland
- North Fort Lewis
- North Puyallup
- Parkland
- Prairie Heights
- Prairie Ridge
- Purdy
- Raft Island
- Rosedale
- South Creek
- South Hill
- Spanaway
- Stansberry Lake
- Summit
- Summit View
- Tehaleh
- Vaughn
- Waller
- Wauna
- Wollochet

=== Unincorporated communities ===
- American Lake
- Bee
- Burnett
- Crescent Valley
- Cromwell
- Electron
- Elgin
- Glencove
- Lakebay
- McNeil Island
- National
- Ohop
- Paradise
- Point Fosdick
- Shore Acres
- Shorewood Beach
- Sunny Bay
- Sylvan
- Victor
- Villa Beach

=== Ghost towns ===
- Fairfax
- Hillhurst
- Melmont

== Notable people ==
- Jessie Kastner (1873–1957), teacher and state politician

== See also ==
- National Register of Historic Places listings in Pierce County, Washington
- Tacoma–Pierce County Health Department
