= North Fort Lewis, Washington =

- CDP
- Location within Washington (state)
- Coordinates: 47°07′47″N 122°35′34″W
- Country: United States
- State: Washington
- County: Pierce

Area
  - Total: 5.9 sq mi (15.3 km^{2})
- Elevation: 246 ft (75 m)

Population (2010)
  - Total: 2,699
  - Density: 457/sq mi (176/km^{2})
- Time zone: Pacific
- GNIS feature ID: 2585012

North Fort Lewis is a census-designated place located in Pierce County, Washington. As of the 2020 census, North Fort Lewis had a population of 5,978. It is a part of Fort Lewis, which is a part of Joint Base Lewis-McChord.

== Demographics ==
Historical population
Census	Pop.	Note	%±
2010	2,699		—
2020	5,978		121.5%
U.S. Decennial Census; 2000 2010

North Fort Lewis first appeared as a census designated place in the 2010 U.S. census formed from part of Fort Lewis CDP.

=== Racial and ethnic composition ===
North Fort Lewis CDP, Washington – Racial and ethnic composition Note: the US Census treats Hispanic/Latino as an ethnic category. This table excludes Latinos from the racial categories and assigns them to a separate category. Hispanics/Latinos may be of any race.
Race / Ethnicity (NH = Non-Hispanic)	Pop 2010	Pop 2020	% 2010	% 2020
White alone (NH)	1,607	2,736	59.54%	45.77%
Black or African American alone (NH)	346	925	12.82%	15.47%
Native American or Alaska Native alone (NH)	17	52	0.63%	0.87%
Asian alone (NH)	100	258	3.71%	4.32%
Native Hawaiian or Pacific Islander alone (NH)	30	144	1.11%	2.41%
Other race alone (NH)	6	44	0.22%	0.74%
Mixed race or Multiracial (NH)	167	438	6.19%	7.33%
Hispanic or Latino (any race)	426	1,381	15.78%	23.10%
Total	2,699	5,978	100.00%	100.00%

=== 2010 census ===
In 2010, it had a population of 2,699 inhabitants. 1,754 were male. 945 were female.
