= Dash Point, Washington =

Unincorporated community in Washington, United States

Dash Point
- Unincorporated community
- Location within the state of Washington
- Coordinates: 47°18′56″N 122°25′24″W
- Country: United States
- State: Washington
- County: Pierce

Area
  - Total: 0.64 sq mi (1.7 km^{2})
- Elevation: 266 ft (81 m)
- Time zone: UTC-8 (Pacific (PST))
  - Summer (DST): UTC-7 (PDT)
- ZIP codes: 98422
- Area code: 253
- GNIS feature ID: 2584965

Dash Point is an unincorporated community in Pierce County, Washington, United States. As of the 2020 census, Dash Point had a population of 963. Dash Point is a residential area surrounded by Puget Sound to the north, Dash Point State Park to the east, and the city of Tacoma to the south and west. Dash Point is located across Commencement Bay from downtown Tacoma.

Dash Point relies entirely on Tacoma for city services, and lacks a town center of its own. Although Dash Point is located in Pierce County, Dash Point State Park is located in neighboring King County.

== History ==
Prior to being known as Dash Point the area was known as lson Landing, Fairview Beach, and Woodstock Beach. The origin of the name Dash Point is unclear. The area was named Dash Point on official maps by 1877.

The land was sold by the McLeod family to the State of Washington in the late 1940s for use as a park. The park was dedicated and developed in 1962 for the Seattle World's Fair.

== Demographics ==
Historical population
Census	Pop.	Note	%±
2010	931		—
2020	963		3.4%
U.S. Decennial Census; 2000 2010

Dash Point first appeared as a census designated place in the 2010 U.S. census.

=== Racial and ethnic composition ===
Dash Point CDP, Washington – Racial and ethnic composition Note: the US Census treats Hispanic/Latino as an ethnic category. This table excludes Latinos from the racial categories and assigns them to a separate category. Hispanics/Latinos may be of any race.
Race / Ethnicity (NH = Non-Hispanic)	Pop 2010	Pop 2020	% 2010	% 2020
White alone (NH)	728	719	78.20%	74.66%
Black or African American alone (NH)	16	21	1.72%	2.18%
Native American or Alaska Native alone (NH)	12	12	1.29%	1.25%
Asian alone (NH)	81	95	8.70%	9.87%
Native Hawaiian or Pacific Islander alone (NH)	4	2	0.43%	0.21%
Other race alone (NH)	1	9	0.11%	0.93%
Mixed race or Multiracial (NH)	56	67	6.02%	6.96%
Hispanic or Latino (any race)	33	38	3.54%	3.95%
Total	931	963	100.00%	100.00%

== Education ==
The area is served by Tacoma Public Schools, a public school district. It is zoned to Browns Point Elementary School, Meeker Middle School, and Stadium High School.
