= North Puyallup, Washington =

- CDP
- Location within Washington (state)
- Coordinates: 47°12′05″N 122°16′27″W
- Country: United States
- State: Washington
- County: Pierce

Area
  - Total: 2.00 sq mi (5.2 km^{2})
- Elevation: 56 ft (17 m)

Population (2020)
  - Total: 1,837
  - Density: 918/sq mi (355/km^{2})
- Time zone: UTC-08:00 (Pacific Standard Time)
  - Summer (DST): UTC-07:00 (Pacific Daylight Time)
- ZIP Code: 98372
- Area code: 253
- GNIS feature ID: 2585014

North Puyallup is a census-designated place located in Pierce County, Washington. It sits on the north bank of the Puyallup River.

As of the 2020 census, North Puyallup had a population of 1,837.

== Demographics ==
Historical population
Census	Pop.	Note	%±
2010	1,743		—
2020	1,837		5.4%
U.S. Decennial Census; 2000 2010 2020

North Puyallup first appeared as a census designated place in the 2010 U.S. census.

=== Racial and ethnic composition ===
North Puyallup CDP, Washington – Racial and ethnic composition Note: the US Census treats Hispanic/Latino as an ethnic category. This table excludes Latinos from the racial categories and assigns them to a separate category. Hispanics/Latinos may be of any race.
Race / Ethnicity (NH = Non-Hispanic)	Pop 2010	Pop 2020	% 2010	% 2020
White alone (NH)	1,535	1,405	88.07%	76.48%
Black or African American alone (NH)	16	24	0.92%	1.31%
Native American or Alaska Native alone (NH)	28	32	1.61%	1.74%
Asian alone (NH)	35	54	2.01%	2.94%
Native Hawaiian or Pacific Islander alone (NH)	4	32	0.23%	1.74%
Other race alone (NH)	3	7	0.17%	0.38%
Mixed race or Multiracial (NH)	40	119	2.29%	6.48%
Hispanic or Latino (any race)	82	164	4.70%	8.93%
Total	1,743	1,837	100.00%	100.00%

=== 2020 census ===
As of the 2020 census, North Puyallup had a population of 1,837. The median age was 51.7 years. 13.3% of residents were under the age of 18 and 27.7% of residents were 65 years of age or older. For every 100 females there were 94.4 males, and for every 100 females age 18 and over there were 94.4 males age 18 and over.

100.0% of residents lived in urban areas, while 0.0% lived in rural areas.

There were 910 households in North Puyallup, of which 16.2% had children under the age of 18 living in them. Of all households, 33.6% were married-couple households, 24.8% were households with a male householder and no spouse or partner present, and 32.9% were households with a female householder and no spouse or partner present. About 40.0% of all households were made up of individuals and 22.2% had someone living alone who was 65 years of age or older.

There were 972 housing units, of which 6.4% were vacant. The homeowner vacancy rate was 1.7% and the rental vacancy rate was 7.5%.

Racial composition as of the 2020 census
Race	Number	Percent
White	1,447	78.8%
Black or African American	27	1.5%
American Indian and Alaska Native	35	1.9%
Asian	55	3.0%
Native Hawaiian and Other Pacific Islander	32	1.7%
Some other race	75	4.1%
Two or more races	166	9.0%
Hispanic or Latino (of any race)	164	8.9%
