= Chief Leschi Schools =

Native American school in Washington (state)

Coordinates: 47°12′43″N 122°21′23″W

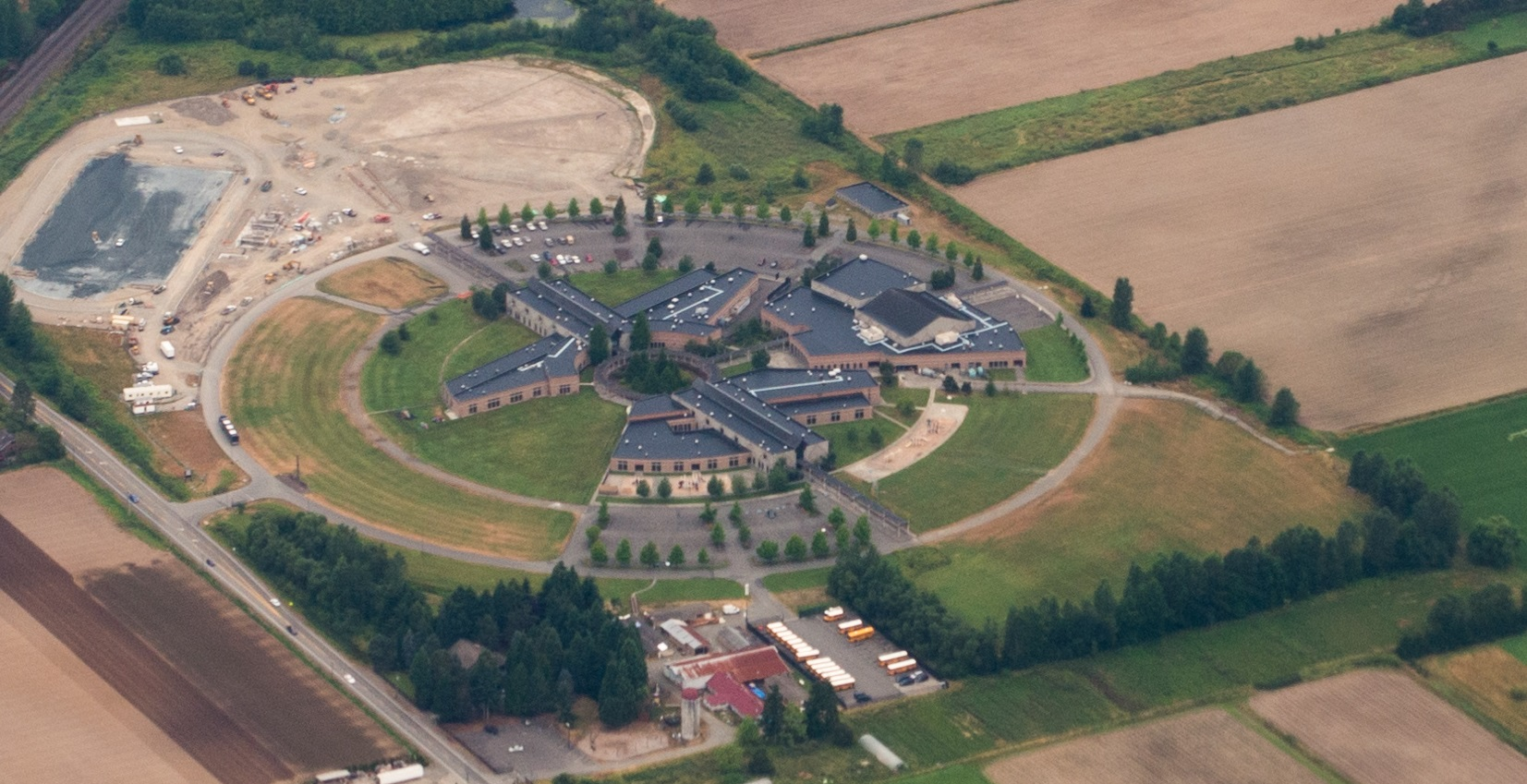
- Waller, Puyallup Indian Reservation, Washington (near Tacoma)

Information
- Established: 1976

Chief Leschi Schools is a Native American tribal school located in the Puyallup Valley near Mount Rainier in Washington. It is a 200,000-square-foot (19,000 m^{2}) facility which is intended to be a model for Native American education. The current building opened in 1996 serving Native American students from 92 different bands which comprise the Puyallup tribe of Indians. It is the largest Bureau of Indian Education (BIE)-affiliated school.

The school is in the Waller census-designated place, in unincorporated Pierce County; that county is in the Seattle-Tacoma metropolitan area. It has a Puyallup postal address, but is not in Puyallup proper.

== History ==
The school opened in 1976. Originally the school used Tacoma School District's Hawthorne Elementary School in Tacoma for its classrooms, and most of its students lived in Tacoma. In 1978 the secondary classes moved to floors two and three of the tribal administration building while elementary students moved to a new building built nearby. The older building, built in 1941, was five stories tall and made of concrete, and had previously been a hospital and a juvenile detention facility.

Linda Rudolph became superintendent in 1985.

By 1991 the older building was out of compliance with building codes and there was concern about its structural integrity.

The current campus opened in fall 1996. Rudolph was removed as superintendent by the board on August 12, 1998.

In 1999 the school had changes in its administration and laid off 50 teachers.

In 2015 Amy Eveskcige, who previously worked for Puyallup School District and Tacoma Public Schools, became the superintendent of Chief Leschi. She was the first Puyallup member to be appointed superintendent.

In May 2016 the school laid off 50 employees, with 22 of them being certified. The layoffs represented 27% of the employees. Students protested the layoffs.

In November 2016 Eveskcige went on paid administrative leave. The school board had asked her to do so. By January 2017 the Puyallup Tribal Council temporarily ended the board's administration of the school and dissolved it, and began directly operating the school. The council returned Eveskcige from her paid leave.

In 2020 Marc Brouillet was already serving as interim superintendent when he was officially appointed as superintendent.

== Admissions ==
Previously the school admitted students who were not enrolled members of Native American tribes, but in 2016 it began dismissing them. This was because the funding formulas change, and because the federal government funds students who are enrolled tribal members only. The editorial board of The News Tribune argued that the administration should have notified students in a more timely member that their enrollment was being canceled. It also criticized the school for turning away students who were in the process of obtaining tribal membership.

== Student body ==
In 1996 it had 710 students.

In August 1998 it had 909 students, with about 90% being Native American.

The institution had almost 1,000 students in 2015, and in May 2016 it had 890 students, with 98% of them being Native American.

It had more than 650 students in November 2016, and 635 students in 2020.

As of 1998 students came from Federal Way, Lacey, and points in between.

== Academic achievement ==
In 1997 its test scores were on the lower end of Washington State test scores, despite higher per-student spending compared to several area school districts.

In 1998 the graduation rate was 58% and the dropout rate was 15%.
