= Parkland, Washington =

- Census-designated place
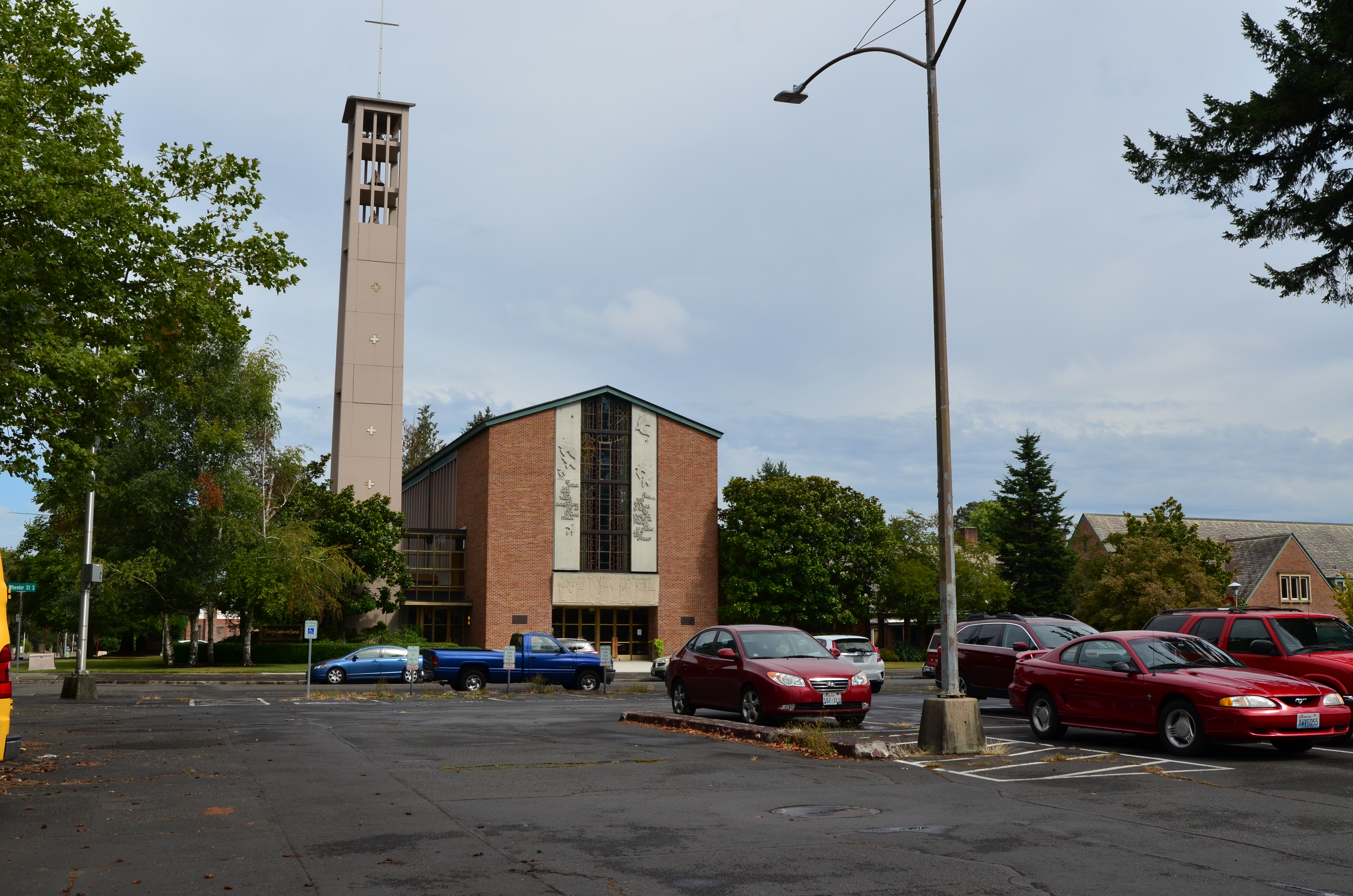
- Trinity Lutheran Church in Parkland

- Location of Parkland, Washington
- Coordinates: 47°07′55″N 122°25′36″W
- Country: United States
- State: Washington
- County: Pierce

Area
  - Total: 7.4 sq mi (19.1 km^{2})
  - Land: 7.4 sq mi (19.1 km^{2})
  - Water: 0.039 sq mi (0.1 km^{2})
- Elevation: 302 ft (92 m)

Population (2020)
  - Total: 38,623
  - Density: 5,240/sq mi (2,020/km^{2})
- Time zone: UTC-8 (Pacific (PST))
  - Summer (DST): UTC-7 (PDT)
- ZIP codes: 98444-98446
- Area code: 253
- FIPS code: 53-53335
- GNIS feature ID: 2409031

Parkland is a census-designated place (CDP) in Pierce County, Washington. The population was 35,803 at the time of the 2010 census and had grown to 38,623 as of the 2020 census. It is an unincorporated suburb of the city of Tacoma and is home to Pacific Lutheran University.

Parkland borders most of Tacoma's southern cutoff at 96th St, and borders with much of the northern cutoff of Spanaway, Washington, at 152nd St (or Military Rd E).

The most influential motorway is State Route 7/Pacific Ave, which travels north and south, and leads from Interstate 5 in Tacoma all the way to Mount Rainier. Pacific Ave is also a main commercial corridor through much of the county, including Parkland.

It was given its name by early white settlers for the park-like nature of the vast Garry Oak and blue camas flower prairie, and the many meandering creeks crossing it. In 1890, Norwegian-Americans from the Midwest chose this area as the site of their new college, which is now Pacific Lutheran University, home to 3,500 full-time students and the Lutes varsity sports teams.

== Geography ==
According to the United States Census Bureau, the CDP has a total area of 7.4 square miles (19.1 km^{2}), of which, 7.4 square miles (19.1 km^{2}) of it is land and 0.04 square miles (0.1 km^{2}) of it (0.41%) is water.

== Demographics ==
Historical population
Census	Pop.	Note	%±
1970	21,012		—
1980	23,355		11.2%
1990	20,882		−10.6%
2000	24,053		15.2%
2010	35,803		48.9%
2020	38,623		7.9%
U.S. Decennial Census; 1960 1970 1980 1990; 2000 2010

Parkland was first listed as an unincorporated place in the 1970 U.S. census; and as a census designated place in the 1980 U.S. census.

=== 2020 census ===
As of the 2020 census, Parkland had a population of 38,623. The median age was 33.7 years. 23.1% of residents were under the age of 18 and 12.9% of residents were 65 years of age or older. For every 100 females there were 95.5 males, and for every 100 females age 18 and over there were 93.2 males age 18 and over.

100.0% of residents lived in urban areas, while 0.0% lived in rural areas.

There were 13,980 households in Parkland, of which 32.0% had children under the age of 18 living in them. Of all households, 38.3% were married-couple households, 21.6% were households with a male householder and no spouse or partner present, and 30.6% were households with a female householder and no spouse or partner present. About 26.0% of all households were made up of individuals and 8.7% had someone living alone who was 65 years of age or older.

There were 14,635 housing units, of which 4.5% were vacant. The homeowner vacancy rate was 0.7% and the rental vacancy rate was 5.3%.

Racial composition as of the 2020 census
Race	Number	Percent
White	19,406	50.2%
Black or African American	4,761	12.3%
American Indian and Alaska Native	627	1.6%
Asian	3,051	7.9%
Native Hawaiian and Other Pacific Islander	1,920	5.0%
Some other race	3,466	9.0%
Two or more races	5,392	14.0%
Hispanic or Latino (of any race)	6,401	16.6%

=== 2000 census ===
As of the census of 2000, there were 24,053 people, 8,869 households, and 5,782 families residing in the CDP. The population density was 3,267.2 people per square mile (1,261.8/km^{2}). There were 9,340 housing units at an average density of 1,268.7/sq mi (490.0/km^{2}). The racial makeup of the CDP was 73.91% White, 8.07% African American, 1.04% Native American, 6.64% Asian, 1.81% Pacific Islander, 2.06% from other races, and 6.47% from two or more races. Hispanic or Latino of any race were 5.33% of the population.

There were 8,869 households, out of which 32.6% had children under the age of 18 living with them, 45.8% were married couples living together, 14.1% had a female householder with no husband present, and 34.8% were non-families. 26.3% of all households were made up of individuals, and 7.4% had someone living alone who was 65 years of age or older. The average household size was 2.55 and the average family size was 3.05.

In the CDP, the age distribution of the population shows 25.0% under the age of 18, 16.9% from 18 to 24, 28.3% from 25 to 44, 19.7% from 45 to 64, and 10.1% who were 65 years of age or older. The median age was 31 years. For every 100 females, there were 94.2 males. For every 100 females age 18 and over, there were 90.8 males.

The median income for a household in the CDP was $39,653, and the median income for a family was $46,210. Males had a median income of $36,169 versus $27,036 for females. The per capita income for the CDP was $18,649. About 10.6% of families and 15.4% of the population were below the poverty line, including 18.7% of those under age 18 and 6.5% of those age 65 or over.

== Education ==
Most of Parkland is within the Franklin Pierce School District. As of October 2004, the district had 7,942 students enrolled.

The following schools have portions of Parkland CDP in their attendance boundaries:

- High schools:
  - Washington High School (most of the Franklin Pierce portion is zoned to this high school)
  - Franklin Pierce High School (in Clover Creek)
- Middle schools:
  - Keithley Middle School (most of the Franklin Pierce portion is zoned to this middle school)
  - Morris E. Ford Middle School (in Midland)
- Elementary schools:
  - Brookdale Elementary
  - Christensen Elementary
  - Elmhurst Elementary
  - James Sales Elementary
  - Collins Elementary (in Clover Creek)
  - Midland Elementary (in Midland)
- Preschools:
  - Dr. Frank Hewins Early Learning Center

Portions of Parkland are in the Bethel School District and the Clover Park School District.

Private Schools:

- Parkland Lutheran School - Vikings (PreK–8th)

Parkland also holds the private college Pacific Lutheran University.

== Notable people ==
- Q. Allan Brocka, television and film director
- Timothy Burkhart, serial killer
- Jack Evans, professional wrestler
- Bjug Harstad, pastor and founding president of Pacific Lutheran University
- Oscar Harstad, MLB pitcher
- Nils Joseph Hong, educator and president of Pacific Lutheran University
- Demetrious Johnson, MMA fighter
