= Franklin Pierce Schools =

School district in Washington, United States

Franklin Pierce School District No. 402 or Franklin Pierce Schools is a school district headquartered in Parkland, Washington (the facility has a Tacoma mailing address).

The district includes the majorities of Parkland, Clover Creek, Midland, and Summit. Additionally the district includes portions of Summit View and Waller and several blocks of Tacoma.

== History ==
In 1998 voters in the district voted in favor of a school bond. In 2016, the voters again voted in favor of a school bond, this time worth $157 million. The bond needed at least 60% of the vote to pass. In 2019, the district began building five elementary schools using 2016 bond money.

== Facilities ==
It has a 10-acre (4.0 ha) farming area for both generating food and as an educational tool. The district paid $44,000 to acquire the land in 1970.

== Schools ==
High schools

- Franklin Pierce High School
- Washington High School
- GATES High School

Middle schools

- Morris E. Ford Middle School
- Perry G. Keithley Middle School

Elementary schools

- Brookdale Elementary School
- Central Avenue Elementary School
- Christensen Elementary School
- Collins Elementary School
  - The original was a Works Progress Administration (WPA) building.
- Elmhurst Elementary School
- Harvard Elementary School
- Midland Elementary School
- James Sales Elementary School

Pre-school

- Hewins Early Learning
