= Waller, Washington =

- CDP
- Location of Waller, Washington
- Coordinates: 47°12′18″N 122°22′34″W
- Country: United States
- State: Washington
- County: Pierce

Area
  - Land: 7.95 sq mi (20.6 km^{2})
- Elevation: 351 ft (107 m)

Population (2020)
  - Total: 8,189
  - Density: 1,000.4/sq mi (386.3/km^{2})
- Time zone: UTC-8 (Pacific (PST))
  - Summer (DST): UTC-7 (PDT)
- FIPS code: 53-75905
- GNIS feature ID: 2409524

Waller is a rural census-designated place (CDP) in Pierce County, Washington, United States. The population was 8,189 at the 2020 census. The population has seen significant growth in the last decade.

== Geography ==
According to the United States Census Bureau, the CDP has a total area of 9.2 square miles (24.0 km^{2}), of which, 9.2 square miles (23.9 km^{2}) of it is land and 0.04 square miles (0.1 km^{2}) of it (0.43%) is water.

== Demographics ==
As of the census of 2000, there were 9,200 people, 3,585 households, and 2,505 families living in the CDP. Waller, Washington is rural with many farmlands. The population density was 999.0 people per square mile (385.7/km^{2}). There were 3,772 housing units at an average density of 409.6/sq mi (158.1/km^{2}). The racial makeup of the CDP was 89.00% White, 1.53% African American, 2.07% Native American, 2.09% Asian, 0.16% Pacific Islander, 1.82% from other races, and 3.34% from two or more races. Hispanic or Latino of any race were 4.33% of the population.

There were 3,585 households, out of which 30.2% had children under the age of 18 living with them, 57.4% were married couples living together, 8.5% had a female householder with no husband present, and 30.1% were non-families. 24.0% of all households were made up of individuals, and 10.4% had someone living alone who was 65 years of age or older. The average household size was 2.55 and the average family size was 3.04.

In the CDP, the age distribution of the population shows 24.4% under the age of 18, 7.1% from 18 to 24, 26.9% from 25 to 44, 28.0% from 45 to 64, and 13.6% who were 65 years of age or older. The median age was 40 years. For every 100 females, there were 97.9 males. For every 100 females age 18 and over, there were 96.8 males.

The median income for a household in the CDP was $47,350, and the median income for a family was $56,164. Males had a median income of $41,471 versus $28,816 for females. The per capita income for the CDP was $21,259. About 5.5% of families and 8.2% of the population were below the poverty line, including 10.9% of those under age 18 and 7.0% of those age 65 or over.

== Education ==
Most of Waller is in the Puyallup School District while a portion is in the Franklin Pierce School District.

The Franklin Pierce portion of Waller is zoned to Franklin Pierce High School.

Chief Leschi Schools, affiliated with the Bureau of Indian Education, is in Waller CDP.

== Public safety ==
Waller is served by the Riverside Fire District, who has a station within Waller.
