= Fairfax, Washington =

Ghost town in Washington (state)

- Ghost town
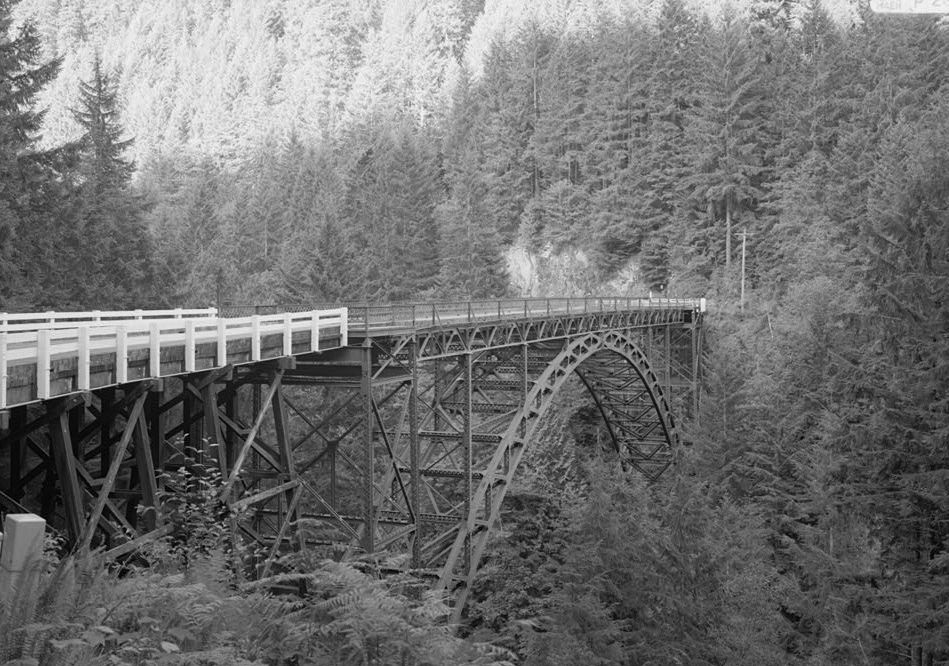
- The Farrell Bridge over the Carbon River near Fairfax

- Location within Washington (state) Location within the United States
- Coordinates: 47°00′41″N 122°00′54″W
- Country: United States
- State: Washington
- County: Pierce
- Time zone: UTC-8 (Pacific (PST))
  - Summer (DST): UTC-7 (PDT)

Fairfax was a coal town in Pierce County in the U.S. state of Washington. The town was located on the Carbon River about 6 miles (10 km) south of Carbonado, Washington, on SR 165. Mining lasted only until the minerals ceased to be economically viable following World War I. Until the completion of the nearby 240 feet (73 m) high O'Farrell Bridge in 1921 (the highest bridge in the state at the time), the town was only accessible via railroad or pack train.

== History ==
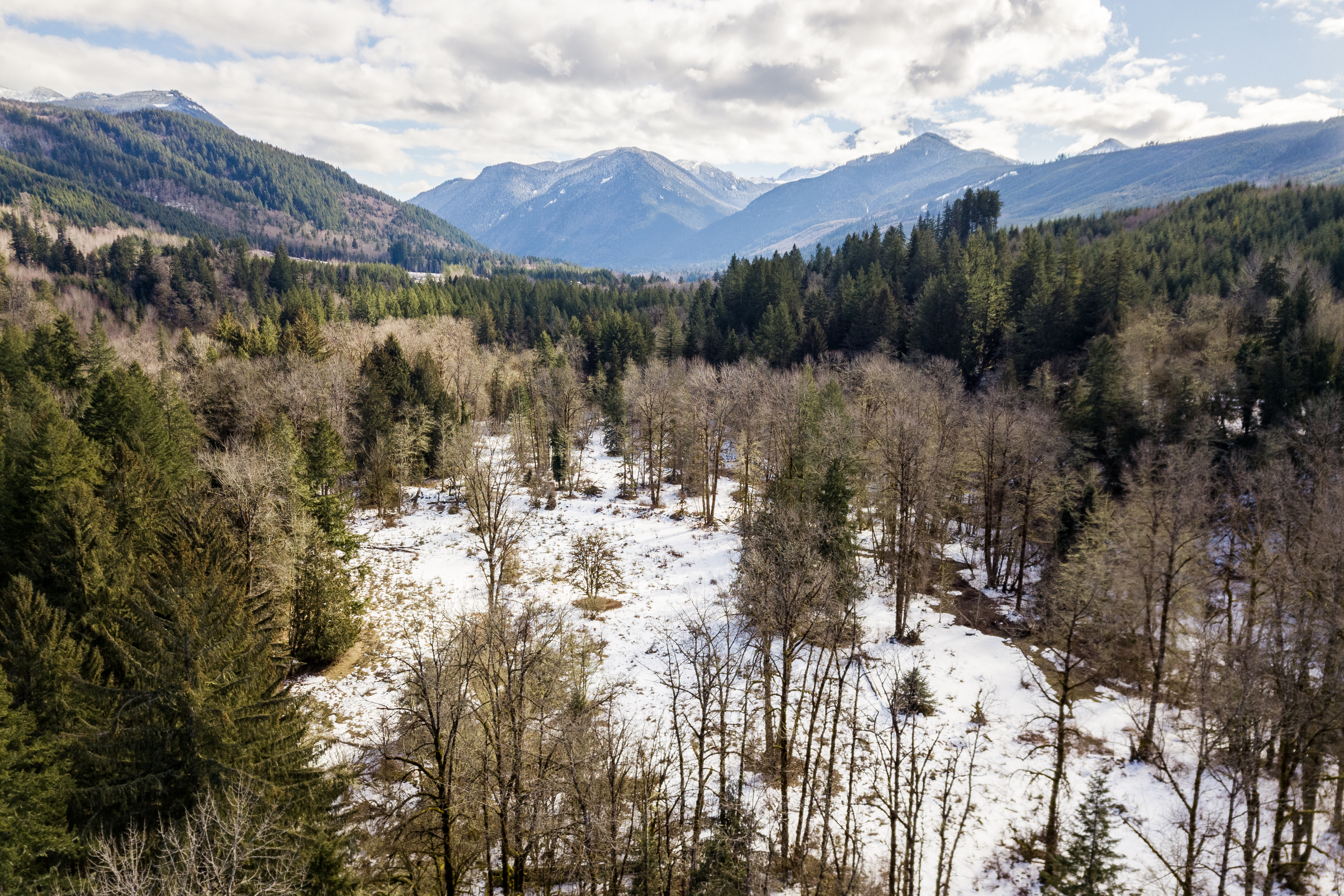
A clearing by the Carbon River remains the most visible remnant of Fairfax

The development of coal first began in 1896 when the Western American Company owned Section 26, T.18N., R.6E which was more commonly known as the Fairfax Mine, a railroad linked Carbonado, Washington to Fairfax with the first shipment of coal being sent out in 1899. Pierce County was one of the only counties in Washington state to produce a coke and in 1902 the Western American Company installed 35 coke ovens and Fairfax was helping lead the way in coke production in the county. In 1906 the Fairfax mine had a total output of 20,000 tons of coal during a nine-month period. During the other three months of 1906 the mine put out 1,858 tons of coal during a 35-day period. In total in 1906, the mine put out 21,858 tons of coal. In 1909 there was an ad that the mine was looking for a coal mine electrician. In 1910 the Manley, Moore Lumber Company was looking to add millwrights and was willing to pay them $3.50-$4 per day. They were also looking for common laborers and was offering them $2.25-$2.50 per day to come work in Fairfax. These ads show that between these years the mine was making enough money that the town was actively searching for new workers. The most productive years of the Fairfax mine was short lived but for a time was profitable. The town is now a destination for hikers and is considered a ghost town.

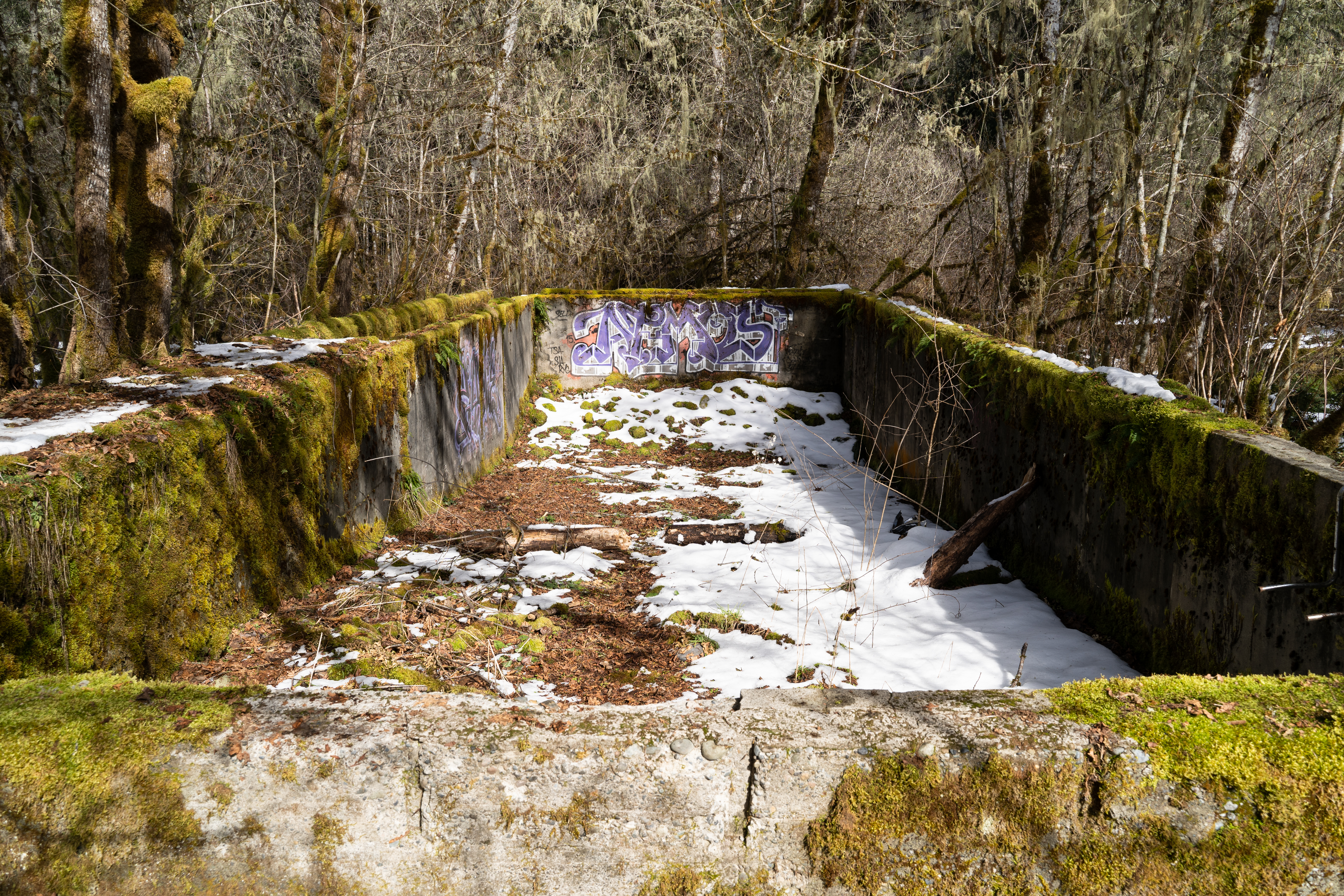
After Fairfax was abandoned, the school swimming pool became the largest remaining element of the town

== See also ==
- Carbonado, Washington
