= Summit, Washington =

- CDP
- Location of Summit, Washington
- Coordinates: 47°10′10″N 122°22′32″W
- Country: United States
- State: Washington
- County: Pierce

Area
  - Land: 5.09 sq mi (13.2 km^{2})
- Elevation: 469 ft (143 m)

Population (2020)
  - Total: 8,270
  - Density: 1,626/sq mi (628/km^{2})
- Time zone: UTC-8 (Pacific (PST))
  - Summer (DST): UTC-7 (PDT)
- ZIP code: 98371
- Area code: 253
- FIPS code: 53-68365
- GNIS feature ID: 2410019

Summit is a census-designated place (CDP) in Pierce County, Washington, United States. The population was 8,270 at the 2020 census.

== Geography ==
According to the United States Census Bureau, the CDP has a total area of 5.09 square miles (13.2 km^{2}), all of it land.

== Demographics ==
As of the census of 2000, there were 8,041 people, 2,990 households, and 2,272 families living in the CDP. The population density was 1,556.4 people per square mile (600.5/km^{2}). There were 3,090 housing units at an average density of 598.1/sq mi (230.8/km^{2}). The racial makeup of the CDP was 88.07% White, 2.15% African American, 0.99% Native American, 2.90% Asian, 0.35% Pacific Islander, 1.80% from other races, and 3.73% from two or more races. Hispanic or Latino of any race were 3.73% of the population.

There were 2,990 households, out of which 33.4% had children under the age of 18 living with them, 63.6% were married couples living together, 8.4% had a female householder with no husband present, and 24.0% were non-families. 18.5% of all households were made up of individuals, and 7.5% had someone living alone who was 65 years of age or older. The average household size was 2.68 and the average family size was 3.04.

In the CDP, the age distribution of the population shows 25.4% under the age of 18, 6.9% from 18 to 24, 28.5% from 25 to 44, 25.9% from 45 to 64, and 13.2% who were 65 years of age or older. The median age was 38 years. For every 100 females, there were 98.7 males. For every 100 females age 18 and over, there were 95.6 males.

The median income for a household in the CDP was $52,685, and the median income for a family was $60,131. Males had a median income of $43,083 versus $31,733 for females. The per capita income for the CDP was $22,915. About 5.2% of families and 6.5% of the population were below the poverty line, including 7.6% of those under age 18 and 5.6% of those age 65 or over.

== Education ==
Most of Summit is in the Franklin Pierce School District while a portion is in the Puyallup School District.

Most of the Franklin Pierce portion is zoned to Central Avenue Elementary School while a portion to the southwest is zoned to Midland Elementary School in Midland. The Franklin Pierce portion of Summit is zoned to Morris E. Ford Middle School in Midland and Franklin Pierce High School in Clover Creek.
