= Clover Creek, Washington =

- CDP
- Location within Washington (state)
- Coordinates: 47°08′11″N 122°22′07″W
- Country: United States
- State: Washington
- County: Pierce

Area
  - Total: 6.5 sq mi (16.8 km^{2})
- Elevation: 427 ft (130 m)

Population (2010)
  - Total: 6,522
  - Density: 1,010/sq mi (388/km^{2})
- Time zone: Pacific
- Area code: 360
- GNIS feature ID: 2411381

Clover Creek is a census-designated place (CDP) located in Pierce County, Washington. As of the 2020 census, Clover Creek had a population of 7,161.

== Demographics ==
Historical population
Census	Pop.	Note	%±
2010	6,522		—
2020	7,161		9.8%
U.S. Decennial Census; 2000 2010

Clover Creek first appeared as a census designated place in the 2010 U.S. census.

=== Racial and ethnic composition ===
Clover Creek CDP, Washington – Racial and ethnic composition Note: the US Census treats Hispanic/Latino as an ethnic category. This table excludes Latinos from the racial categories and assigns them to a separate category. Hispanics/Latinos may be of any race.
Race / Ethnicity (NH = Non-Hispanic)	Pop 2010	Pop 2020	% 2010	% 2020
White alone (NH)	4,756	4,415	72.92%	61.65%
Black or African American alone (NH)	351	455	5.38%	6.35%
Native American or Alaska Native alone (NH)	68	81	1.04%	1.13%
Asian alone (NH)	352	436	5.40%	6.09%
Native Hawaiian or Pacific Islander alone (NH)	96	102	1.47%	1.42%
Other race alone (NH)	9	37	0.14%	0.52%
Mixed race or Multiracial (NH)	383	567	5.87%	7.92%
Hispanic or Latino (any race)	507	1,068	7.77%	14.91%
Total	6,522	7,161	100.00%	100.00%

=== 2010 census ===
In 2010, it had a population of 6,522 inhabitants. 3,031 are male. 3,491 are female.

== Education ==
The majority of the community is in the Franklin Pierce School District, while a portion lies in the Bethel School District.

Franklin Pierce High School is in the Clover Creek CDP. Most of the Franklin Pierce portion is zoned to Collins Elementary School, while portions north of 112th Street are zoned to Central Avenue Elementary School in Summit and Midland Elementary School in Midland. The Franklin Pierce portion of Clover Creek is zoned to Morris E. Ford Middle School in Midland and Franklin Pierce High.
