= Midland, Washington =

- CDP
- Location of Midland, Washington
- Coordinates: 47°10′24″N 122°24′43″W
- Country: United States
- State: Washington
- County: Pierce

Area
  - Total: 3.04 sq mi (7.9 km^{2})
  - Land: 3.04 sq mi (7.9 km^{2})
  - Water: 0 sq mi (0.0 km^{2})
- Elevation: 413 ft (126 m)

Population (2020)
  - Total: 9,962
  - Density: 3,280.2/sq mi (1,266.5/km^{2})
- Time zone: UTC-8 (Pacific (PST))
  - Summer (DST): UTC-7 (PDT)
- FIPS code: 53-45495
- GNIS feature ID: 2408829

Midland is a census-designated place (CDP) in Pierce County, Washington. The population was 9,962 at the time of the 2020 census.

== Geography ==
According to the United States Census Bureau, the CDP has a total area of 3.04 square miles (7.9 km^{2}), all of it land.

== History ==
The area that we have come to know as Midland in part was often referred to by the pioneers as Puyallup Hill. Taking advantage of the Governments Donation Land Grant of 1850, both Ezra Meeker and his older brother Oliver Meeker settled in the area in 1855. This was after their father, Jacob Meeker came west. Jacob settled in the area of South Tacoma. Not wanting to cross the sound Jacob talked both sons into moving to the mainland from their island home on McNeil Island. With this Ezra and Oliver staked out claims on the mainland next to each other. Ezra located his claim on the north side of Oliver's claim. These claims were described as the forest between Nisqually Plain and the Puyallup River.

Hudson Bay employees often referenced the northern end of Nisqually Plain as the Puyallup Plain, which is all of South Tacoma and Lakewood. Just to the east of this was called the Puyallup Swamp, that area to the north of Wapato Lake and south following the base of the Puyallup Hill.

The claims' combined borders are starting from the north and moving clockwise. The North border is now the 88th hundred block. The East border is now 24th Avenue E. jogging over at 96th to Swan creek, and south to 104th Street E. The South border is now 104th Street E. jogging over at 14th Avenue E to roughly 109th Street E. and west to Golden Given Road E. The West border is now Golden Given Road E. Golden Given Road E is also the east border of the Jessie Dunlap Donation Land Claim with the north and south borders roughly the same as the combined Meeker claims. Ezra talked of how his three closest neighbors were connected by a road and trails. The forest was so tall and thick that it was impossible to see any of the neighbors' houses. Come night it was impossible to see for the stars and moon could not penetrate the tree canopy.

A few years after the local uprising of the native populace more commonly known as the Indian War of 1855 & 56 and the death of his brother Oliver while on a family business trip in San Francisco, Ezra became disenchanted with his claim and in 1862 moved to Puyallup. Years later with the claims finally secured from the government both by Ezra and Oliver's wife Amanda, the claims were then sold.

In September 1888, Joesephus S. Howell and Dr. Charles H. Spinning developed both claims into lots with streets, the Plat of Southeast Tacoma. The water company that served the area for many years prior to Tacoma Power & Water was named after this plat, the Southeast Tacoma Mutual Water Company. 97th Street E, also known in the past as Mount Tacoma Drive, was originally platted as Division Avenue. It was also the dividing line between Ezra's and Oliver's claims. North from Division the streets that run from east to west were North 1st, 2nd, 3rd, and 4th Street. South of Division was South 1st, 2nd, and 3rd Street. Streets that ran from north to south were named after the presidents of the United States, and most of these streets retained their presidents’ names well into the 20th century. The changes to the current numbered streets took place when Pierce County updated its addressing system for the 1982 Enhanced 911 Emergency Dispatch system. Within a year of the Southeast Tacoma Plat, a Railroad and Trolley would come to the area.

The western part of the Washington Territory became the State of Washington on 11 November 1889. One railroad was already here and others wanting to come. Land speculation was riding high and it was no different for the Midland area. In 1889 three Railroads came to this area, well, at least on paper, and they secured their rights of way. This was the Tacoma Puyallup Railway, Tacoma Eastern Railroad, and the Portland & Puget Sound Railroad.

The first was the Tacoma Puyallup Railway incorporated by a man named Randolph Foster Radebaugh. R.F. Radebaugh came to Tacoma from San Francisco in 1880 and was one of Tacoma's best promoters from the very start. He was the father of the Daily Ledger, Tacoma's first daily newspaper. In 1889 Randolph put together the street car line, named the Tacoma and Fern Hill Railway for the area it served. Later within the same year, that line was extended into Midland and on towards Puyallup. The name was changed to Tacoma Puyallup Railway. If you lived in Tacoma or on the hill, the line was generally referred to as the Puyallup Hill Line. If you lived in Puyallup it was affectionately called the Grapevine Line. Later, Puyallup was served by another railway called the Short Line. The old line then became the Old Grapevine Line.

This streetcar line was initially powered by a steam dummy on a narrow gauge 40 lb. rail. The steam dummy at the time was an eight-ton locomotive that from the outside looked like a coach rail car. In later years, the rail line became part of Tacoma Railway & Power Company. The line was then converted to standard gauge and electrified. Upon completion of the initial line the last spike was driven by the nephew of Ezra Meeker, Frank Oliver Meeker on June 29, 1890. Frank owned the land near the southwest corner of the newly incorporated City of Puyallup and near where the street car line first entered the city limits. This was also the same area where years later in 1919, the rail lines were washed out, never to be replaced. With the Short Line in place and serving Puyallup from the north, the old line was abandoned up to Woodland and the tracks removed. The communities from Woodland to Tacoma would still be served for a few more years by the Puyallup Hill Line.

The second rail line into Midland was that of the Hart brothers’ railroad. Incorporated as Tacoma Eastern Railroad, this was to serve their saw mill operation at 46th St. E. and McKinley. Within a short time it was extended into the forests of the Midland area. On paper the right of way continued out to what is now the 23 hundred block of 112th St. E. This is close to where the Washington State Patrol building is now. Over time the ownership changed and the line was completed to Ashford. By 1905 the line was extended across the river into Lewis County and on into Mineral. Within a few years, the end of the line had reached the logging town of Morton.

The third rail line into the area never got past the surveying of the right of way. This was the Portland and Puget Sound Railroad out of Portland, Oregon. This was a disguised Union Pacific rail line. The Union Pacific had been trying to access the Puget Sound region for a number of years. If people got wind of another major railroad coming to town, land prices would escalate. So, a lot of railroad companies would try to hide the fact that a major railroad was coming in. They would disguise themselves as a newly formed, on a shoestring budget-type railroad. In actuality, by 1889 the Union Pacific Rail Road was having genuine financial difficulties and was on a shoe string budget anyway. In 1890 Jay Gould and John D. Rockefeller pooled their money and gained control of the Union Pacific, halting further progress of the Portland and Puget Sound Rail Road. However, after the death of Jay Gould and some years later, the plans for the Union Pacific to gain access to the Puget Sound Region were revived, under the new name of the Oregon & Washington Rail Road, later changed to the Oregon & Washington Railroad & Navigation Company. In the beginning, with multiple speculated routes, the Union Pacific was serious enough to start digging tunnels in the hills of both major cities: Tacoma and Seattle. Before the tunnels could be finished an agreement was made with Northern Pacific to use the water line route and gain access to Tacoma through the Bennett Tunnel that runs under Pt. Defiance. This, however, did not stop any rumors of the Union Pacific building their shops in the Midland area using the old Portland and Puget Sound right of way.

"Midland" first shows up in writing on the Midland Townsite Plat of 1890, by the Olympic Land Company. The Plat's northern border is 104th St. E. from the 14 hundred block on the west to a half block east of 26th Ave. E. This street was named "Achilles" (104th St. E.), and was also the southern border of the Southeast Tacoma Plat from the year before. The north–south street names followed suit with Southeast Tacoma Plat(president's names). Where there were extra streets, they were named after trees. The southern border is 112th St E with the 14 hundred block on the west to just past 22nd Ave E, then north to the 107 hundred block, and West to half a block east of 26th Ave. E. This puts Midland Elementary School in the Northeast area of the plat, Ford Middle school in the Northwest corner of the plat and Franklin Pierce High School in the Southwest corner of the plat.

The consensus of the people in the area has always been that Midland was named for the midpoint of the Old Trolley Line. The actual midpoint centers on 97th St E. and Portland Avenue, almost a ½ mile nearer to Tacoma from the townsite plat where Midland school is located. The town site of the Midland Plat was signed and notarized on the 10th of April 1890. Frank Meeker drove the customary last spike on June 29, 1890, making the track still under construction when the plat was signed. Because the Plat of Midland was close to the center of the street car line, it is most likely that the Midland Townsite was named by its planners for the midpoint of the new trolley line. In 1900, the centralized community of Midland was centered on the corner of Achilles (also known as Summit Road) and Van Buren St. known today as 104th St E. and Portland Ave E. The Midland Community of today now centers closer to the actual midpoint of the old trolley Line at 99th St E. and Portland Ave.

== Demographics ==
As of the census of 2000, there were 7,414 people, 2,841 households, and 1,929 families residing in the CDP. The population density was 2,443.1 people per square mile (944.7/km^{2}). There were 3,028 housing units at an average density of 997.8/sq mi (385.8/km^{2}). The racial makeup of the CDP was 71.11% White, 8.44% African American, 2.39% Native American, 5.75% Asian, 0.92% Pacific Islander, 4.41% from other races, and 6.99% from two or more races. Hispanic or Latino of any race were 9.32% of the population.

There were 2,841 households, out of which 36.2% had children under the age of 18 living with them, 43.4% were married couples living together, 18.2% had a female householder with no husband present, and 32.1% were non-families. 25.0% of all households were made up of individuals, and 8.7% had someone living alone who was 65 years of age or older. The average household size was 2.61 and the average family size was 3.09.

In the CDP, the population was spread out, with 28.9% under the age of 18, 10.0% from 18 to 24, 30.3% from 25 to 44, 19.4% from 45 to 64, and 11.4% who were 65 years of age or older. The median age was 33 years. For every 100 females, there were 96.2 males. For every 100 females age 18 and over, there were 90.6 males.

The median income for a household in the CDP was $34,817, and the median income for a family was $38,071. Males had a median income of $32,272 versus $25,563 for females. The per capita income for the CDP was $16,815. About 13.2% of families and 15.5% of the population were below the poverty line, including 23.2% of those under age 18 and 4.8% of those age 65 or over.

== Education ==
The majority of Midland is in the Franklin Pierce School District, while a small part is in Tacoma Public Schools.

Zoned elementary schools for the Franklin Pierce section include: Midland, Harvard, and Central Avenue (in Summit). The Franklin Pierce portion of Midland is zoned to Morris E. Ford Middle School and Franklin Pierce High School (in Clover Creek).

The Tacoma schools portion is zoned to Larchmont Elementary School, Baker Middle School, and Mt. Tahoma High School.
