= List of bridges documented by the Historic American Engineering Record in Washington (state) =

This is a list of bridges documented by the Historic American Engineering Record in the US state of Washington.

== Bridges ==
Survey No.	Name (as assigned by HAER)	Status	Type	Built	Documented	Carries	Crosses	Location	County	Coordinates
OR-50	Columbia River Gorge Bridge at Astoria	Extant	Cantilever	1966	1990	US 101	Columbia River	Megler, Washington, and Astoria, Oregon	Pacific County, Washington, and Clatsop County, Oregon	46°13′01″N 123°51′47″W
WA-2	Lacey V. Murrow Memorial Floating Bridge	Extant	Pontoon bridge	1940	1993	I-90 eastbound	Lake Washington	Seattle and Mercer Island	King	47°35′24″N 122°16′13″W
WA-3	Washington Street Bridge	Replaced	Reinforced concrete closed-spandrel arch	1908	1982	Washington Street	Spokane River	Spokane	Spokane	47°39′40″N 117°25′06″W
WA-4	Grant Avenue Bridge	Replaced	Parker truss	1911	1982	Grant Avenue	Yakima River	Prosser	Benton	46°12′49″N 119°46′09″W
WA-5	Chow Chow Suspension Bridge	Demolished	Cable-stayed	1950	1979	Quinault Reservation road	Quinault River	Taholah	Grays Harbor	47°21′11″N 124°11′34″W
WA-8	Pasco–Kennewick Bridge	Replaced	Cantilever	1922	1980	SR 397	Columbia River	Pasco and Kennewick	Franklin and Benton	46°13′06″N 119°06′14″W
WA-13-F	Yakima Valley Transportation Company Interurban Railroad, Naches River Bridge	Extant	Pegram truss	1907	1985	Yakima Valley Transportation Company	Naches River	Yakima	Yakima	46°37′41″N 120°31′13″W
WA-22	West Wishkah Bridge	Replaced	Warren truss	1915	1988	West Wishkah Road	Wishkah River middle fork	Aberdeen	Grays Harbor	47°07′24″N 123°46′35″W
WA-25	McClure Bridge	Replaced	Pratt truss	1908	1989	Altergott Road	Palouse River north fork	Palouse	Whitman	46°56′49″N 117°08′44″W
WA-28	Grays River Covered Bridge	Extant	Howe truss	1905	1991	Worrel Road	Grays River	Grays River	Wahkiakum	46°21′18″N 123°34′52″W
WA-31	F Street Bridge	Replaced	Pratt truss	1904	1990	F Street	Palouse River	Palouse	Whitman	46°54′36″N 117°04′07″W
WA-32	Orient Bridge	Replaced	Parker truss	1909	1992	Richardson Road	Kettle River	Orient and Kettle Falls	Ferry and Stevens	48°51′59″N 118°11′52″W
WA-35	Mount Rainier National Park Roads and Bridges	Extant	Various	1899	1992	Mount Rainier National Park roads		Longmire	Pierce	
WA-43	Chinook Pass Entrance	Extant	Timber stringer	1936	1992	Pacific Crest Trail	SR 410 (Mather Memorial Highway)	Longmire	Pierce	46°52′20″N 121°30′52″W
WA-44	Nisqually Suspension Bridge	Extant	Suspension	1924	1992	Service road	Nisqually River	Longmire	Pierce	46°44′57″N 121°48′27″W
WA-45	Paradise River Fourth Crossing Bridge	Extant	Reinforced concrete closed-spandrel arch	1927	1992	Paradise Loop Road	Paradise River	Longmire	Pierce	46°47′25″N 121°43′37″W
WA-46	Edith Creek Bridge	Extant	Reinforced concrete closed-spandrel arch	1926	1992	Paradise Loop Road	Edith Creek	Longmire	Pierce	46°47′26″N 121°43′48″W
WA-47	Paradise River First Crossing Bridge	Extant	Reinforced concrete closed-spandrel arch	1928	1992	Service road	Paradise River	Longmire	Pierce	46°46′31″N 121°44′47″W
WA-48	Christine Falls Bridge	Extant	Reinforced concrete closed-spandrel arch	1928	1992	Paradise Loop Road	Van Trump Creek	Longmire	Pierce	46°46′51″N 121°46′46″W
WA-49	Dry Creek Bridge	Extant	Reinforced concrete cast-in-place slab	1929	1992	Yakima Park Highway	Deadwood Creek	Longmire	Pierce	46°54′26″N 121°32′34″W
WA-50	Klickitat Creek Bridge	Extant	Reinforced concrete closed-spandrel arch	1930	1992	Yakima Park Highway	Klickitat Creek	Longmire	Pierce	46°54′17″N 121°32′52″W
WA-51	St. Andrews Creek Bridge	Extant	Reinforced concrete closed-spandrel arch	1931	1992	West Side Road	St. Andrews Creek	Longmire	Pierce	46°50′07″N 121°54′21″W
WA-52	South Puyallup River Bridge	Extant	Reinforced concrete closed-spandrel arch	1931	1992	West Side Road	Puyallup River south fork	Longmire	Pierce	46°48′29″N 121°53′31″W
WA-53	White River Bridge	Extant	Reinforced concrete closed-spandrel arch	1929	1992	Yakima Park Highway	White River	Longmire	Pierce	46°53′53″N 121°37′08″W
WA-54	Fryingpan Creek Bridge	Extant	Steel arch	1931	1992	Yakima Park Highway	Fryingpan Creek	Longmire	Pierce	46°53′17″N 121°36′35″W
WA-55	Laughingwater Creek Bridge	Replaced	Reinforced concrete girder	1935	1992	SR 123 (East Side Highway)	Laughingwater Creek	Packwood	Lewis	46°44′54″N 121°33′25″W
WA-56	Deadwood Creek Bridge	Replaced	Reinforced concrete open-spandrel arch	1937	1992	SR 410 (Mather Memorial Highway)	Deadwood Creek	Longmire	Pierce	46°54′18″N 121°32′25″W
WA-57	Deer Creek Bridge	Extant	Reinforced concrete closed-spandrel arch	1939	1992	SR 123 (East Side Highway)	Deer Creek	Longmire	Pierce	46°49′51″N 121°31′08″W
WA-58	Stevens Creek Bridge	Extant	Reinforced concrete girder	1941	1992	Stevens Canyon Highway	Stevens Creek	Packwood	Lewis	46°46′33″N 121°42′08″W
WA-59	Nickel Creek Bridge	Extant	Reinforced concrete closed-spandrel arch	1952	1992	Stevens Canyon Highway	Nickel Creek	Packwood	Lewis	46°45′38″N 121°37′40″W
WA-60	Muddy Fork Cowlitz River Bridge	Extant	Reinforced concrete closed-spandrel arch	1952	1992	Stevens Canyon Highway	Cowlitz River, Muddy Fork	Ashford	Pierce	46°45′56″N 121°38′09″W
WA-61	Nisqually Glacier Bridge	Extant	Steel built-up girder	1961	1992	Nisqually Road	Nisqually River	Longmire	Pierce	46°46′54″N 121°45′44″W
WA-62	Paradise River Second Crossing Bridge	Extant	Reinforced concrete girder	1926	1992	Nisqually Road	Paradise River	Packwood	Lewis	46°46′43″N 121°44′20″W
WA-65	Cispus Valley Bridge	Extant	Howe truss	1939	1992	Forest Service Road 2306	Cispus River	Randle	Lewis	46°26′43″N 121°51′47″W
WA-72	Fairfax Bridge	Extant	Steel arch	1921	1993	SR 165	Carbon River	Carbonado	Pierce	47°02′31″N 122°02′29″W
WA-73	McMillin Bridge	Bypassed	Reinforced concrete truss	1934	1993	SR 162 (former)	Puyallup River	McMillin	Pierce	47°07′47″N 122°14′09″W
WA-76	Sunbeam Creek Culvert	Extant	Reinforced concrete closed-spandrel arch		1992	Stevens Canyon Highway	Sunbeam Creek	Longmire	Pierce	46°45′57″N 121°43′05″W
WA-77	North Pullayup River Bridge (Ruins)	Demolished		1934	1992	West Side Road	Puyallup River north fork	Ashford	Pierce	
WA-80-E	Keechelus Dam, Bridge	Demolished			2001		Keechelus Dam spillway	Easton	Kittitas	47°19′37″N 121°20′10″W
WA-83	North 21st Street Bridge	Extant	Reinforced concrete girder	1911	1993	North 21st Street	Buckley Gulch	Tacoma	Pierce	47°16′03″N 122°28′11″W
WA-85	Indian Timothy Memorial Bridge	Bypassed	Reinforced concrete through arch	1923	1993	US 12 (former)	Alpowa Creek	Silcott	Asotin	46°24′43″N 117°12′48″W
WA-86	Vancouver–Portland Interstate Bridge	Extant	Vertical-lift bridge	1916	1993	I-5	Columbia River	Vancouver, Washington, and Portland, Oregon	Clark County, Washington, and Multnomah County, Oregon	45°37′05″N 122°40′31″W
WA-87	Yale Bridge	Extant	Suspension	1932	1993	SR 503	Lewis River	Yale and Chelatchie	Cowlitz and Clark	45°57′39″N 122°22′23″W
WA-88; WA-106	Snake River Bridge at Lyons Ferry	Extant	Cantilever	1927	1993	SR 261	Snake River	Starbuck	Columbia	46°35′23″N 118°13′10″W
WA-89; WA-106	Longview Bridge	Extant	Cantilever	1930	1993	SR 433	Columbia River	Longview, Washington, and Rainier, Oregon	Cowlitz County, Washington, and Columbia County, Oregon	46°06′17″N 122°57′43″W
WA-90	Columbia River Bridge at Bridgeport	Extant	Cantilever	1950	1993	SR 17	Columbia River	Bridgeport	Douglas and Okanogan	48°00′04″N 119°39′17″W
WA-91; WA-106	Columbia River Bridge at Kettle Falls	Extant	Cantilever	1941	1993	US 395 / SR 20	Columbia River	Kettle Falls and Barney's Junction	Stevens and Ferry	48°37′33″N 118°07′03″W
WA-92	Wishkah River Bridge	Extant	Strauss bascule	1925	1993	US 12 (East Wishkah Street)	Wishkah River	Aberdeen	Grays Harbor	46°58′38″N 123°48′42″W
WA-93	Hoquiam River Bridge	Extant	Strauss bascule	1928	1993	US 101 (Simpson Avenue)	Hoquiam River	Hoquiam	Grays Harbor	46°58′31″N 123°52′37″W
WA-94	Dosewallips River Bridge	Replaced	Pennsylvania truss	1923	1993	US 101	Dosewallips River	Brinnon	Jefferson	47°41′25″N 122°53′57″W
WA-95	Spokane River Bridge at Long Lake Dam	Extant	Reinforced concrete open-spandrel arch	1949	1993	SR 231	Spokane River	Reardan	Lincoln	47°50′20″N 117°51′08″W
WA-96	South Hamma Hamma River Bridge	Extant	Reinforced concrete through arch	1923	1993	US 101	Hamma Hamma River	Eldon	Mason	47°32′44″N 123°02′33″W
WA-97	North Hamma Hamma River Bridge	Extant	Reinforced concrete through arch	1924	1993	US 101	Hamma Hamma River	Eldon	Mason	47°32′55″N 123°02′38″W
WA-99	Tacoma Narrows Bridge	Extant	Suspension	1951	1993	SR 16 westbound	Tacoma Narrows	Tacoma	Pierce	47°16′08″N 122°33′06″W
WA-100	City Waterway Bridge	Extant	Vertical-lift bridge	1913	1993	SR 509	Thea Foss Waterway	Tacoma	Pierce	47°15′14″N 122°26′01″W
WA-101	Purdy Bridge	Extant	Reinforced concrete box girder	1936	1993	SR 302	Burley Lagoon	Purdy	Pierce	47°23′02″N 122°37′41″W
WA-102; WA-106	Columbia River Bridge at Grand Coulee Dam	Extant	Cantilever	1935	1993	SR 155	Columbia River	Grand Coulee	Okanogan and Douglas	47°57′56″N 118°58′56″W
WA-103; WA-106	Deception Pass Bridge	Extant	Cantilever	1935	1993	SR 20	Deception Pass	Anacortes and Oak Harbor	Skagit and Island	48°24′22″N 122°38′40″W
WA-104	Canoe Pass Bridge	Extant	Steel arch	1935	1993	SR 20	Canoe Pass	Anacortes	Skagit	48°24′32″N 122°38′43″W
WA-105	Baker River Bridge (Henry Thompson Bridge)	Extant	Reinforced concrete open-spandrel arch	1916	1993	SR 20 (former)	Baker River	Concrete	Skagit	48°32′26″N 121°44′39″W
WA-106	Washington State Cantilever Bridges	Extant	Cantilever		1993			Olympia	Thurston	
WA-106; WA-107	Aurora Avenue Bridge	Extant	Cantilever	1931	1993	SR 99 (Aurora Avenue N)	Lake Union	Seattle	King	47°38′47″N 122°20′51″W
WA-108	Montlake Bridge	Extant	Simple trunnion bascule	1925	1993	SR 513 (Montlake Boulevard E/NE)	Montlake Cut	Seattle	King	47°38′50″N 122°18′17″W
WA-110	Lake Keechelus Snowshed Bridge	Replaced	Reinforced concrete T-beam	1951	1993	Snoqualmie Pass	I-90 westbound	Hyak	Kittitas	47°21′16″N 121°21′54″W
WA-111	Chehalis River Riverside Bridge	Extant	Warren truss	1939	1993	SR 6	Chehalis River	Chehalis	Lewis	46°39′27″N 122°59′09″W
WA-112	South Fork Newaukum River Bridge	Replaced	Warren truss	1930	1993	SR 508	Newaukum River south fork	Onalaska	Lewis	46°34′34″N 122°50′11″W
WA-113	Spokane River Bridge at Fort Spokane	Extant	Cantilever	1941	1993	SR 25	Spokane River	Miles	Lincoln	47°54′29″N 118°19′03″W
WA-115	Company Creek Bridge No. 2	Replaced	Baltimore truss	1948	1989	Company Creek Road	Stehekin River	Stehekin	Chelan	48°20′57″N 120°42′51″W
WA-117	Outlet Creek Bridge	Replaced	Timber stringer	1935	1993	Sullivan Lake Road	Outlet Creek	Metaline Falls	Pend Oreille	48°50′21″N 117°17′20″W
WA-141	Raging River Bridge No. 234A	Replaced	Steel built-up girder	1937	1997	Preston–Fall City Road	Raging River	Fall City	King	47°33′52″N 121°53′21″W
WA-163	Latah Creek Bridge No. 4102	Replaced	Reinforced concrete open-spandrel arch	1924	1998	Prairie View Road	Latah Creek	Waverly	Spokane	47°20′21″N 117°13′38″W
WA-201	Evergreen Point Floating Bridge	Replaced	Pontoon bridge	1963	2010	SR 520	Lake Washington	Seattle and Medina	King	47°38′26″N 122°15′36″W
WA-212	Union Pacific Bridge	Demolished	Steel built-up girder	1910	2011	Union Pacific Railroad	Sulphur Creek Wasteway	Midvale	Yakima	46°16′46″N 120°00′04″W

== See also ==
- List of tunnels documented by the Historic American Engineering Record in Washington (state)
