= Washington State Route 162 =

Rural state highway in Pierce County, Washington, US

State Route 162

- SR 162 highlighted in red

Route information
- Auxiliary route of SR 410
- Maintained by WSDOT
- Length: 17.37 mi (27.95 km)
- Existed: 1964–present

Major junctions
- West end: SR 410 in Sumner
- East end: SR 165 near Buckley

Location
- Country: United States
- State: Washington
- County: Pierce

Highway system
- State highways in Washington; Interstate; US; State; Scenic; Pre-1964; 1964 renumbering; Former
← SR 161	→ SR 163

State Route 162 (SR 162) is a 17.37-mile-long (27.95 km) state highway in the U.S. state of Washington, serving rural Pierce County. The highway travels from an interchange with SR 410 in Sumner and travels south along the Puyallup River to Orting and northeast to South Prairie, ending at an intersection with SR 165 near Buckley. SR 162 was established in 1964 as the successor to Secondary State Highway 5E (SSH 5E), codified in 1937. The highway crossed the Puyallup River northwest of Orting on the McMillin Bridge, which opened in 1934 and was replaced with a newer bridge that opened in 2015.

== Route description ==
SR 162 begins at a diamond interchange with the SR 410 freeway in Sumner and travels south as a continuation of Valley Avenue, crossing the Puyallup River. The highway continues south through rural Pierce County, following a Ballard Terminal Railroad line and the Puyallup River. It serves the community of Alderton and joins the Pierce County Foothills Trail, traveling southeast from Puyallup. SR 162 crosses the Puyallup River on a bridge parallel to the historic McMillin Bridge west of its confluence with the Carbon River. The highway becomes Washington Avenue as it travels southeast through Orting, serving Orting High School. The highway turns southwest onto Bridge Street and crosses the Foothills Trail before turning back southeast onto Harman Way, later Pioneer Way outside Orting, towards South Prairie. SR 162 continues northeast, crossing the Foothills Trail and the Carbon River before passing through South Prairie. The highway travels east, crossing South Prairie Creek and passing White River High School, before ending at an intersection with SR 165 southwest of Buckley.

Every year, the Washington State Department of Transportation (WSDOT) conducts a series of surveys on its highways in the state to measure traffic volume. This is expressed in terms of annual average daily traffic (AADT), which is a measure of traffic volume for any average day of the year. In 2011, WSDOT calculated that between 4,100 and 21,000 vehicles per day used the highway, mostly between Sumner and Orting.

== History ==
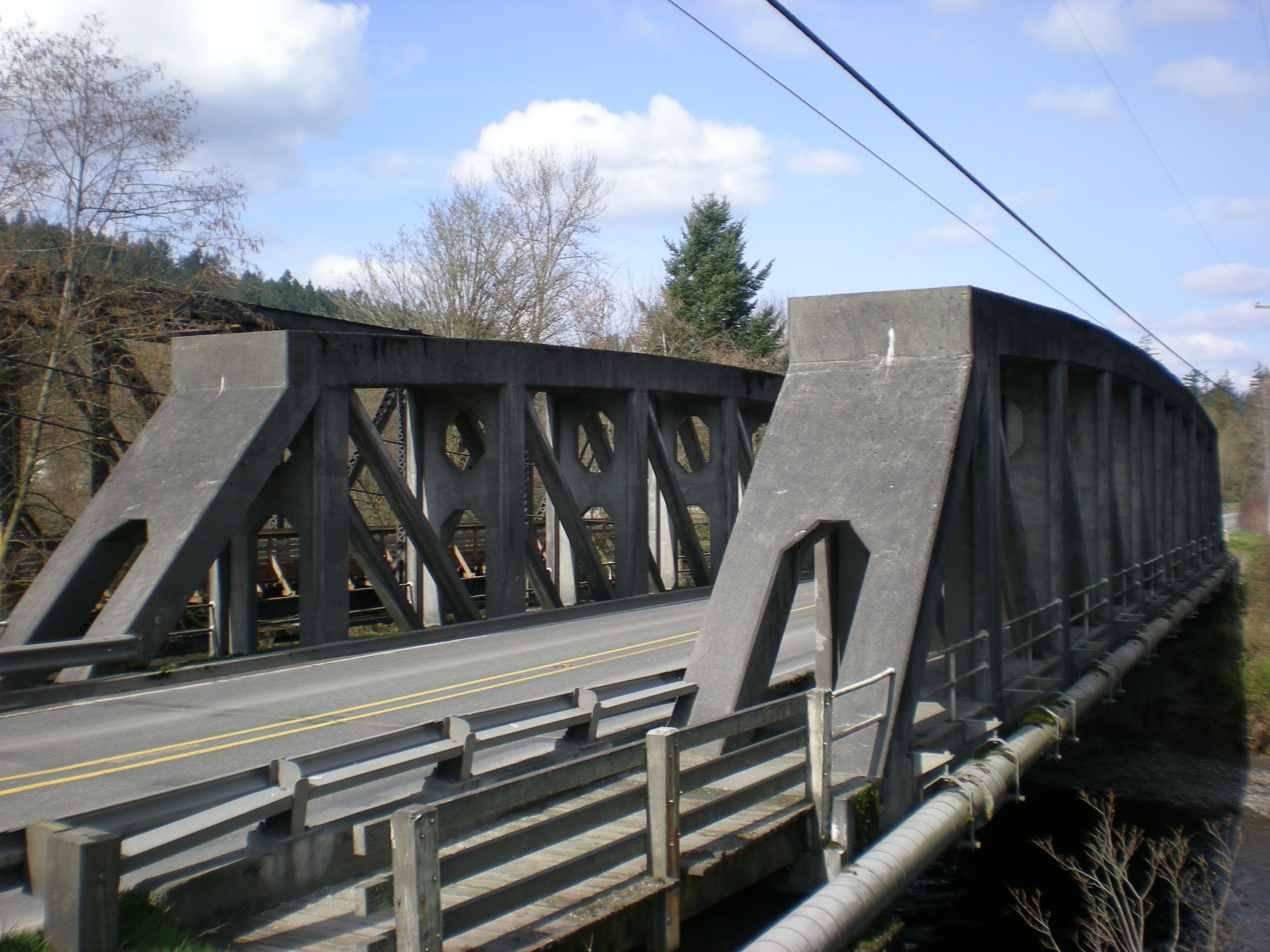
Until 2015, SR 162 crossed the Puyallup River northwest of Orting on the McMillin Bridge

SR 162 was codified as SSH 5E during the creation of the primary and secondary state highways in 1937, beginning at Primary State Highway 5 (PSH 5) and U.S. Route 410 in Puyallup, traveling through Orting and South Prairie to end at an intersection with a branch of PSH 5 southwest of Buckley. SSH 5E had a branch that traveled south from Orting to Electron that was removed from the state highway system in 1955. The highway traveled across the Puyallup River into Orting on the McMillin Bridge, which opened in 1934 as a concrete half-through truss bridge to save the Department of Highways a total of $826. SR 162 was established during the 1964 highway renumbering and was codified in 1970 as the replacement to SSH 5E. The western terminus, now at SR 410, was moved east to an interchange in Sumner after the completion of the Sumner Freeway in 1972. The McMillin Bridge was added to the National Register of Historic Places in 1982 as an example of a half-through truss bridge built with concrete instead of steel. The route of the highway has not seen a major revision since 1972; however, WSDOT repaved the roadway and added guardrails between Orting and Buckley in 2008. The deteriorating McMillin Bridge was replaced by WSDOT with a two-lane, 40-foot-wide (12 m) span over the Puyallup River that opened in September 2015. The old bridge was saved from demolition and cordoned off to prevent use by traffic.

== Major intersections ==
The entire highway is in Pierce County.

Location	mi	km	Destinations	Notes
Sumner	0.00– 0.08	0.00– 0.13	SR 410 – Tacoma, Bonney Lake, Buckley	Western terminus, interchange, continues as Valley Avenue
	17.37	27.95	SR 165 – Buckley, Wilkeson, Carbon River Ranger Station	Eastern terminus
1.000 mi = 1.609 km; 1.000 km = 0.621 mi
