= Washington State Route 165 =

State highway in Pierce County, Washington, US

State Route 165
- Carbon Glacier Highway
- SR 165 highlighted in red

Route information
- Auxiliary route of SR 410
- Maintained by WSDOT
- Length: 21.18 mi (34.09 km)

Major junctions
- South end: Mount Rainier National Park near Mowich Lake
- SR 162 near South Prairie
- North end: SR 410 in Buckley

Location
- Country: United States
- State: Washington
- Counties: Pierce

Highway system
- State highways in Washington; Interstate; US; State; Scenic; Pre-1964; 1964 renumbering; Former
← SR 164	→ SR 166

State Route 165 (SR 165) is a state highway in Pierce County, Washington, United States. It travels north–south along the Carbon River between Mount Rainier National Park near Mowich Lake to a junction with SR 410 in Buckley. The highway passes through the towns of Carbonado and Wilkeson and also intersects SR 162 near South Prairie. SR 165 is the only state highway in Washington to include an unpaved section.

== Route description ==
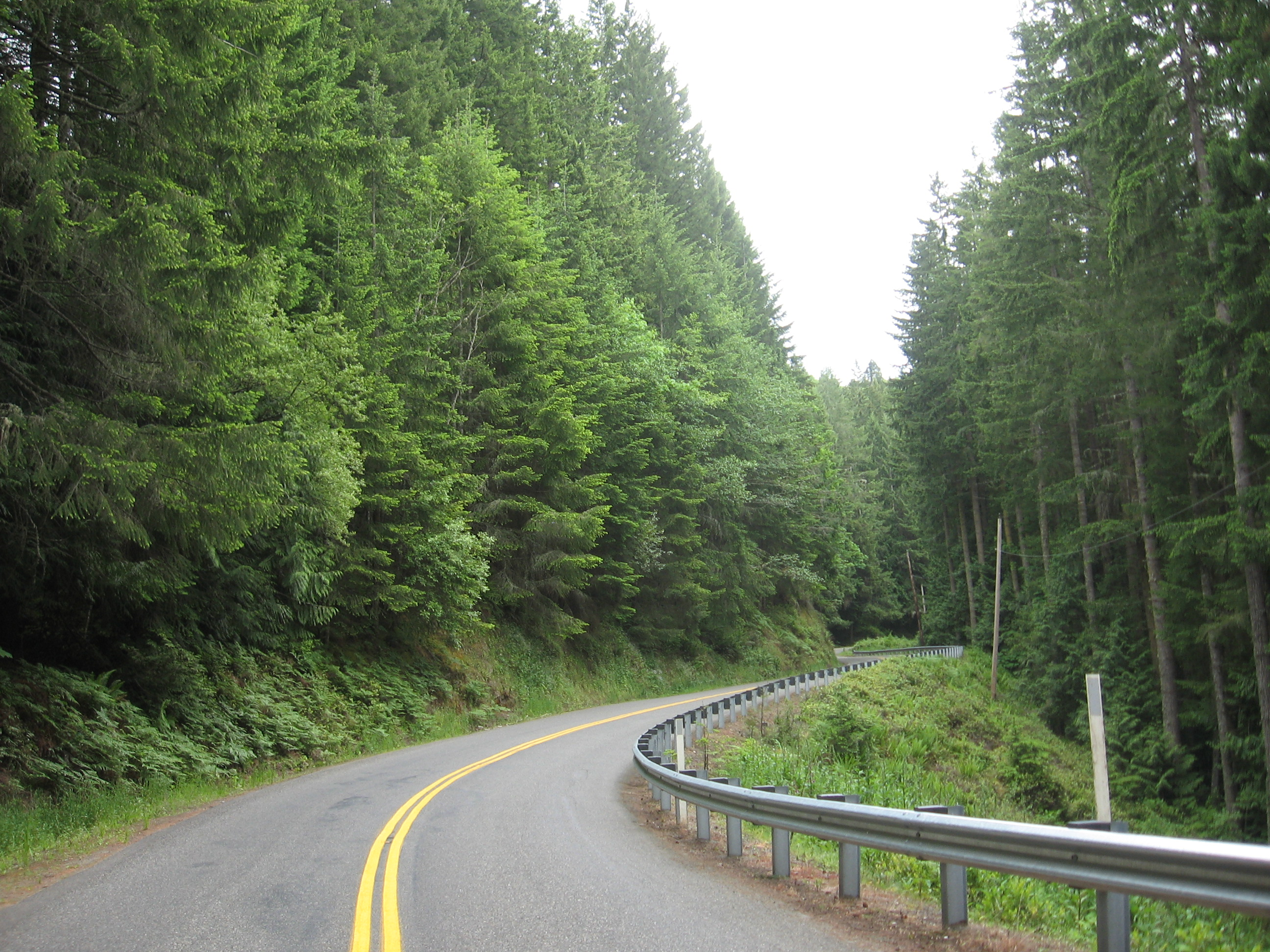
SR 165 near the small town of Wilkeson

SR 165 begins at the western boundary of Mount Rainier National Park on Mowich Lake Road, which continues east for 6 miles (9.7 km) to a campground at Mowich Lake on the northwestern flank of Mount Rainier. Mowich Lake Road is open seasonally from July to October, remaining closed to vehicular traffic during the winter and spring due to weather conditions. The southernmost section of the highway is an unpaved gravel road—the only one to be included in Washington's state highway system.

The highway travels northwest along Evans Creek through a section of the Mount Baker–Snoqualmie National Forest, passing several trailheads. At a junction with Fairfax Forest Reserve Road, which serves an alternate entrance to Mount Rainier National Park, SR 165 turns north to follow the Carbon River, which it crosses on the Fairfax Bridge, a single-lane arch bridge. The highway continues along the east bank of the Carbon River to Carbonado, where it passes through the east side of the town and neighboring Wilkeson. SR 165 continues north and intersects SR 162 east of South Prairie, turning northeast to follow the Foothills Trail. The highway terminates at SR 410 in southwestern Buckley.

SR 165 is maintained by the Washington State Department of Transportation (WSDOT), which conducts an annual survey on state highways to measure traffic volume in terms of annual average daily traffic. Average traffic volumes on the highway in 2016 ranged from a minimum of 190 vehicles near its junction with Fairfax Forest Preserve Road to a maximum of 6,900 vehicles near SR 410 in Buckley.

In April of 2025, the section of the highway south of Carbonado was closed to vehicle traffic.

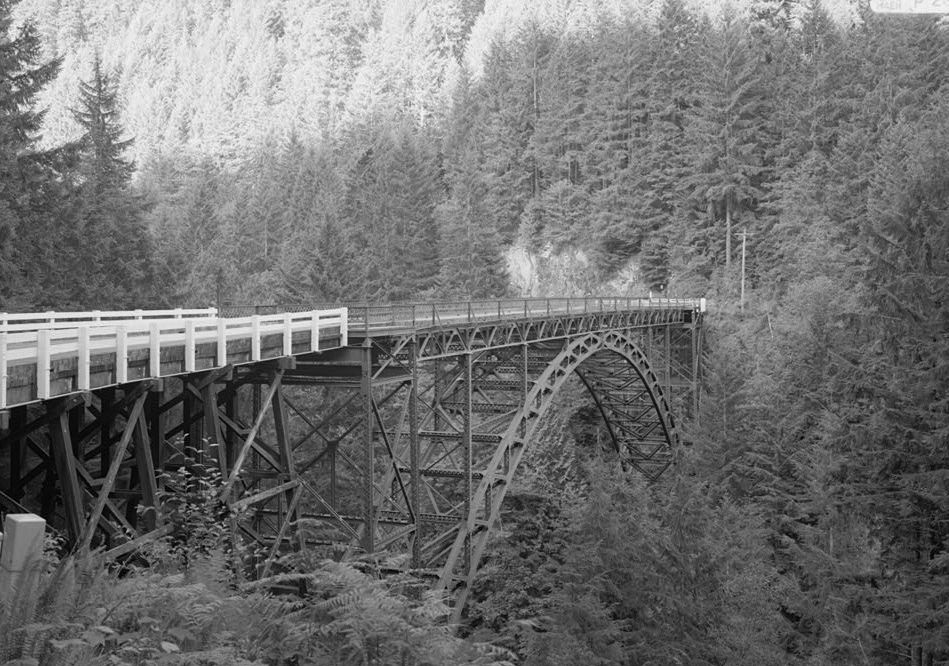
SR-165's Fairfax Bridge was the highest bridge in the state when it was built in 1921.

== History ==
SR 165 was added to the state highway system in 1931 as a part of State Road 5. The highway had been preceded by a series of logging roads constructed in the early 20th century by private companies with claims near the national park. An unpaved road along the Carbon River leading to the national park opened in 1921, including the James R. O'Farrell Bridge (now the Fairfax Bridge, which opened on December 17. The Bureau of Public Roads surveyed the route for a potential connection between the Carbon River and Nisqually entrances to Mount Rainier National Park in the 1920s, but did not fund its construction. The road to Mowich Lake was completed in 1933.

In 1937, State Road 5 was renamed Primary State Highway 5, and what is now SR 165 was the Enumclaw-Fairfax branch of that highway (except between Enumclaw and Buckley, which is now SR 410). The road to Mowich lake was completed in 1933, but remained closed to vehicular traffic until 1955. When the current highway numbering system was developed with the 1964 renumbering, the highway became State Route 165. In 2021, the Washington State Transportation Commission designated SR 165 as the Carbon Glacier Highway to recognize the Carbon Glacier on Mount Rainier.

In April of 2025, the section of the highway south of the Fairfax Bridge was rendered inaccessible to vehicle and pedestrian traffic due to the closure of the bridge after structural issues were discovered. The closure begins just south of Carbonado, before the bridge itself.

== Major intersections ==
The entire highway is in Pierce County.

Location	mi	km	Destinations	Notes
	0.00	0.00	Mount Rainier National Park	Road continues as Mowich Lake Road
	10.91	17.56	Fairfax Forest Preserve Road – Mount Rainier National Park	
Carbon River	11.55	18.59	Fairfax Bridge	
	19.56	31.48	SR 162 west – South Prairie, Orting	
	21.18	34.09	SR 410 – Tacoma, Enumclaw, Yakima	
1.000 mi = 1.609 km; 1.000 km = 0.621 mi
