= Foothills Trail (disambiguation) =

The term Foothills Trail may refer to:

- Foothills Trail, a 76-mile trail in South and North Carolina for recreational hiking and backpacking.
- Pierce County Foothills Trail, a rail-trail in Pierce County, Washington.
