= White River Bridge (disambiguation) =

White River Bridge may refer to:

- White River Bridge, Mount Rainier National Park, Washington state
- White River Bridge at Elkins, Elkins, Arkansas
- White River Bridge (Clarendon, Arkansas)
