= White River School District =

Public school district in Buckley, Washington, USA

White River School District 416
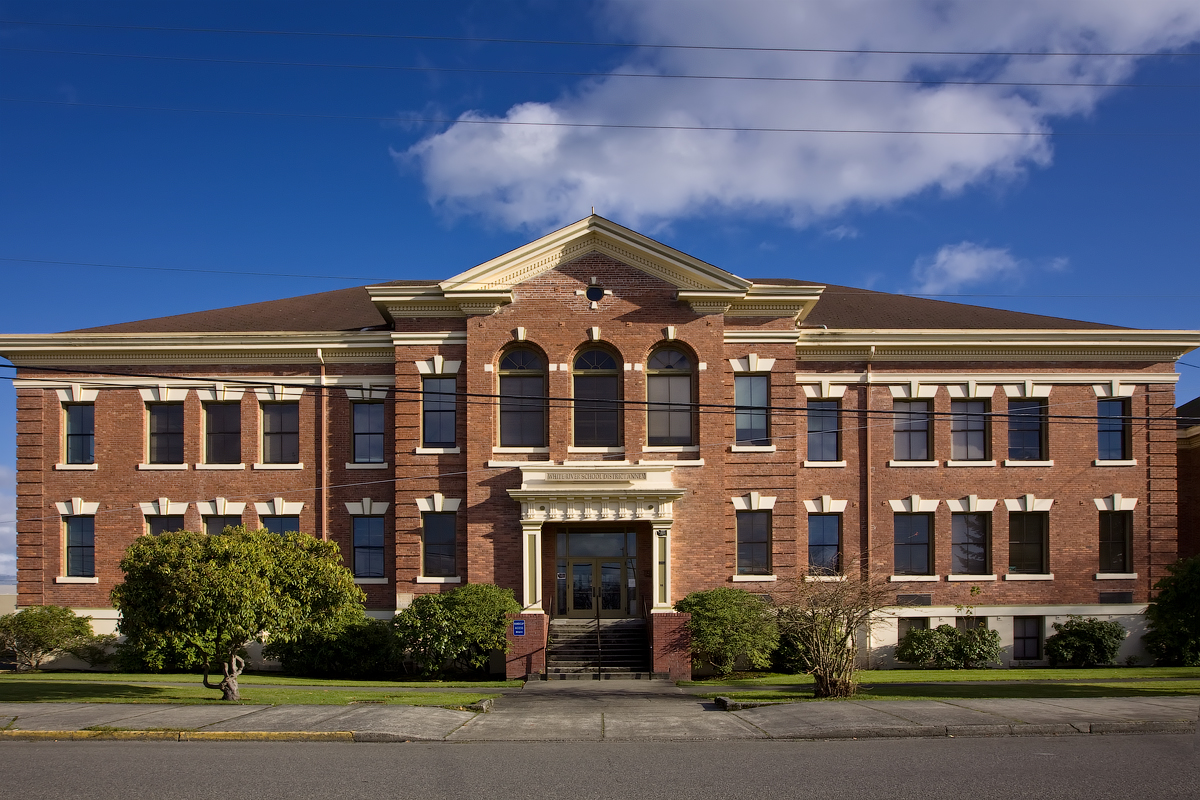
- The White River School District administration building in Buckley

Location
- 240 N A St Buckley, Washington, 98321; United States

District information
- Type: Public school district
- Motto: What's Best for Kids
- Grades: PK–12
- Superintendent: Dr. Scott Harrison
- Enrollment: ~4,500

Other information
- Website: www.whiteriver.wednet.edu

The White River School District 416 is a public school district based in Buckley, Washington. The district serves communities in northern Pierce County, including Buckley, Wilkeson, and surrounding areas. As of the 2023-2024 school year, the district has an approximate enrollment of 4,500 students.

== History ==
The district's history is tied to the early development of its core communities. The current administration building, located on North A Street in Buckley, was first constructed in 1910 as a new brick schoolhouse for the Buckley school district. One of the district's most historic buildings is Wilkeson Elementary School, which was built in 1912 using sandstone from a local quarry. The building is listed on the National Register of Historic Places and remains in operation, making it one of the oldest operational schoolhouses in the state.

The district's name and modern boundaries were shaped by a mid-century merger. Before 1949, White River High School was known as Buckley High School. In 1949, the Buckley district merged with the neighboring Enumclaw school district, and the high school was renamed "White River." This union was short-lived; in 1952, voters in Enumclaw opted to de-consolidate and form their own separate district, leaving the White River School District with its new name and boundaries centered around Buckley.

In 2001, voters passed a bond to construct a new, modern high school facility. The new 240,000-square-foot (22,000 m2) White River High School opened in September 2003, located just outside of Buckley. The previous high school campus in downtown Buckley was then converted to become Glacier Middle School.

== Schools ==
The district operates eight schools:

=== High Schools (9-12) ===
- White River High School
- White River Reengagement Program

=== Middle School (6-8) ===
- Glacier Middle School

=== Elementary Schools ===
- Elk Ridge Elementary (PK-5)
- Foothills Elementary (1-5)
- Mountain Meadow Elementary (1-5)
- Wilkeson Elementary School (K-5)

=== Other ===
- White River Early Learning Center (PK)
