= Foothills Trail (Washington) =

Trail in Pierce County, Washington

Coordinates: 47°11′5.31″N 122°15′1.67″W

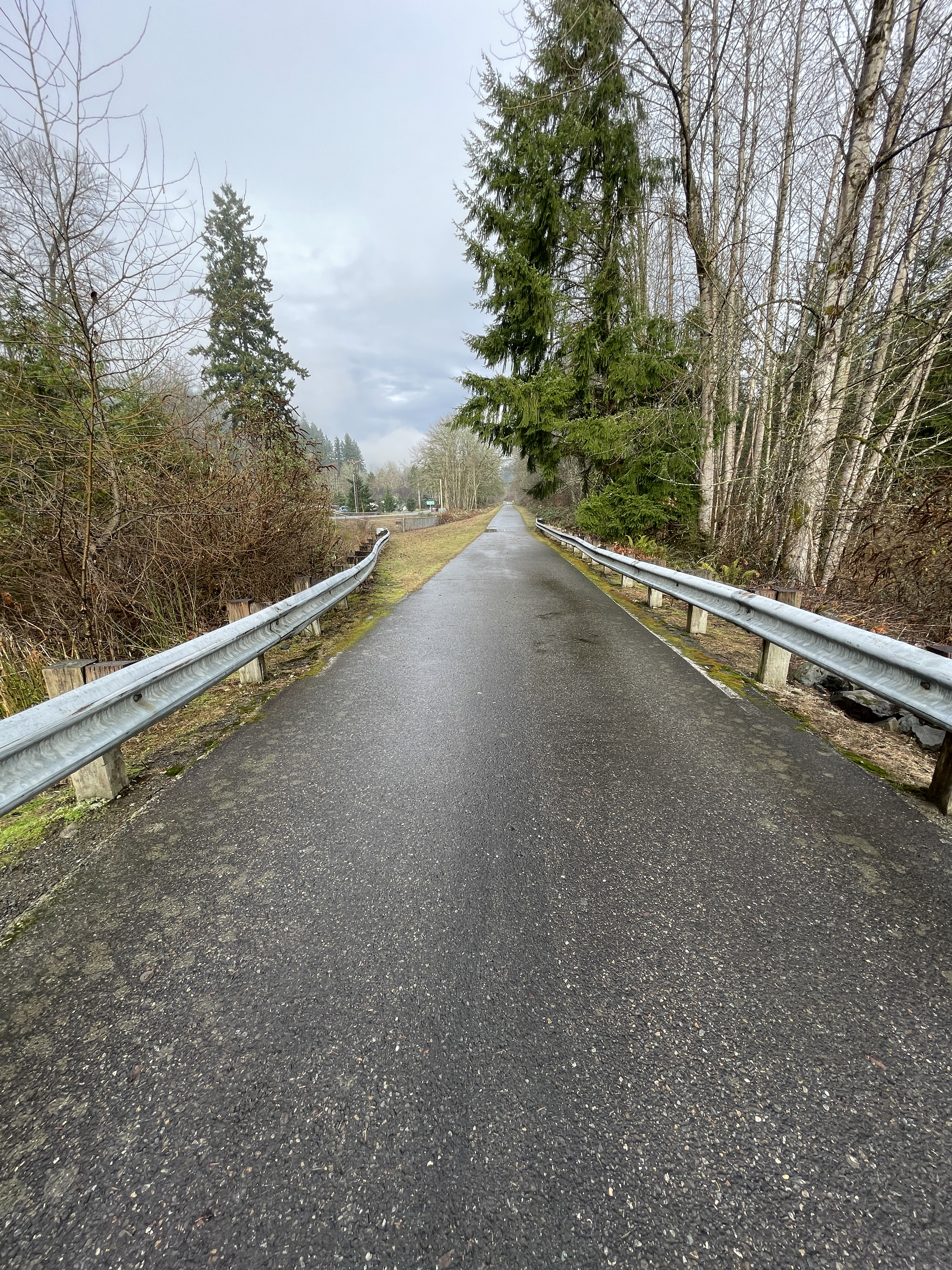
- Length: 21.0 miles (33.8 km)
- Location: Pierce County, Washington
- Designation: National Recreation Trail, 2012
- Trailheads: Puyallup to Buckley
- Use: Non-motorized use
- Hazards: Road crossings
- Surface: Mostly paved

The Foothills Trail is a non-motorized rail-trail in eastern Pierce County, Washington, extending uninterrupted for 22 miles (35 km) from Puyallup to Enumclaw. The trail is used by cyclists, walkers, joggers, inline skaters, and horse riders. Listed as Foothills Regional Trail, it was designated a National Recreation Trail in 2012.

== Route ==
The trail begins in Puyallup and progresses to the community of McMillan. This portion of the route is paved and travels through farmland and is mostly separated from road traffic though the path twice crosses railroad tracks. The trail continues into downtown Orting, paralleling (but not on) State Route 162, and passing through the city's Central Park. There are frequent views of Mount Rainier during this short section. The path advances on to South Prairie while overlooking the Carbon River during certain stretches. Passing wildlife viewpoints, the trail continues along State Route 410 through Buckley and across the White River to Enumclaw, where it terminates.

== History ==
The Foothills Trail originally terminated in Buckley until the construction of a bridge over the White River that connected to an existing King County trail that reaches Enumclaw. The bridge, opened in October 2024, is 572 feet (174 m) long and was constructed at a cost of $16 million. After a truck strike damaged the parallel bridge carrying State Route 410 over the White River in August 2025, the Foothills Trail bridge became the only direct route between Buckley and Enumclaw. King County Metro and Pierce Transit began operating temporary shuttle bus routes to connect with each end of the bridge.

== Future plans ==
Longer-range plans call for the western end of the trail to extend through Sumner and connect with the Interurban Trail (King County) (which runs through Auburn, Washington and Kent, Washington) to Pacific, Washington and is planned to connect to existing segments in Edgewood and Milton, Washington. Construction began on a short segment in Fife, Washington. The northeastern terminus is expected to eventually reach Enumclaw, Washington, while the southeastern end may go through Carbonado, Washington and extend to the entrance of Mount Rainier National Park. Milestones along the trail count down the distance to the park.
