= McMillin Bridge =

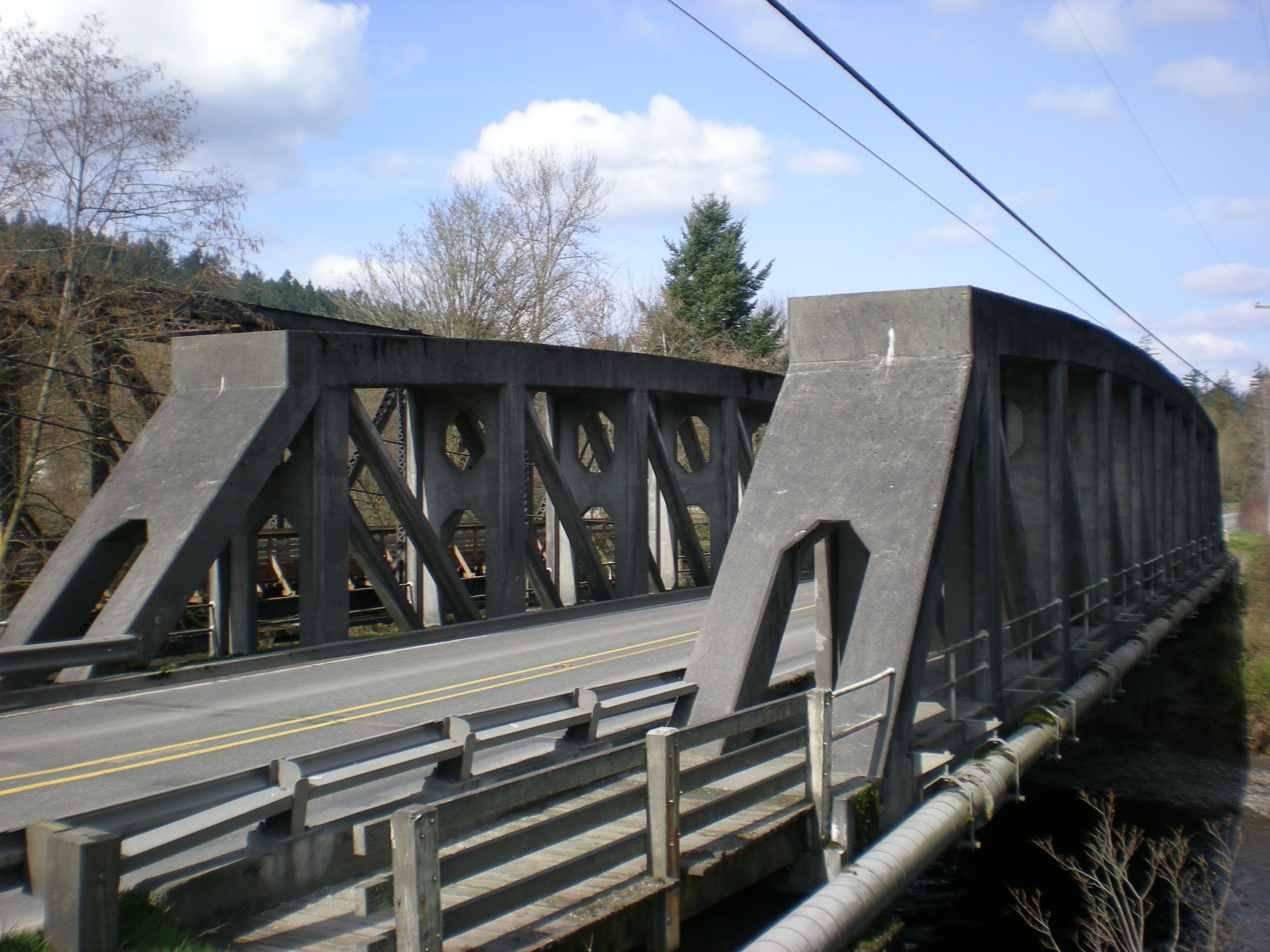
- Coordinates: 47.1297227°N 122.2359037°W
- Carries: SR 162 (until 2015)
- Crosses: Puyallup River
- Locale: Pierce County, Washington

Characteristics
- Design: Concrete half-through truss bridge
- Longest span: 170 feet (52 m)

History
- Opened: 1934
- McMillin Bridge
- U.S. National Register of Historic Places
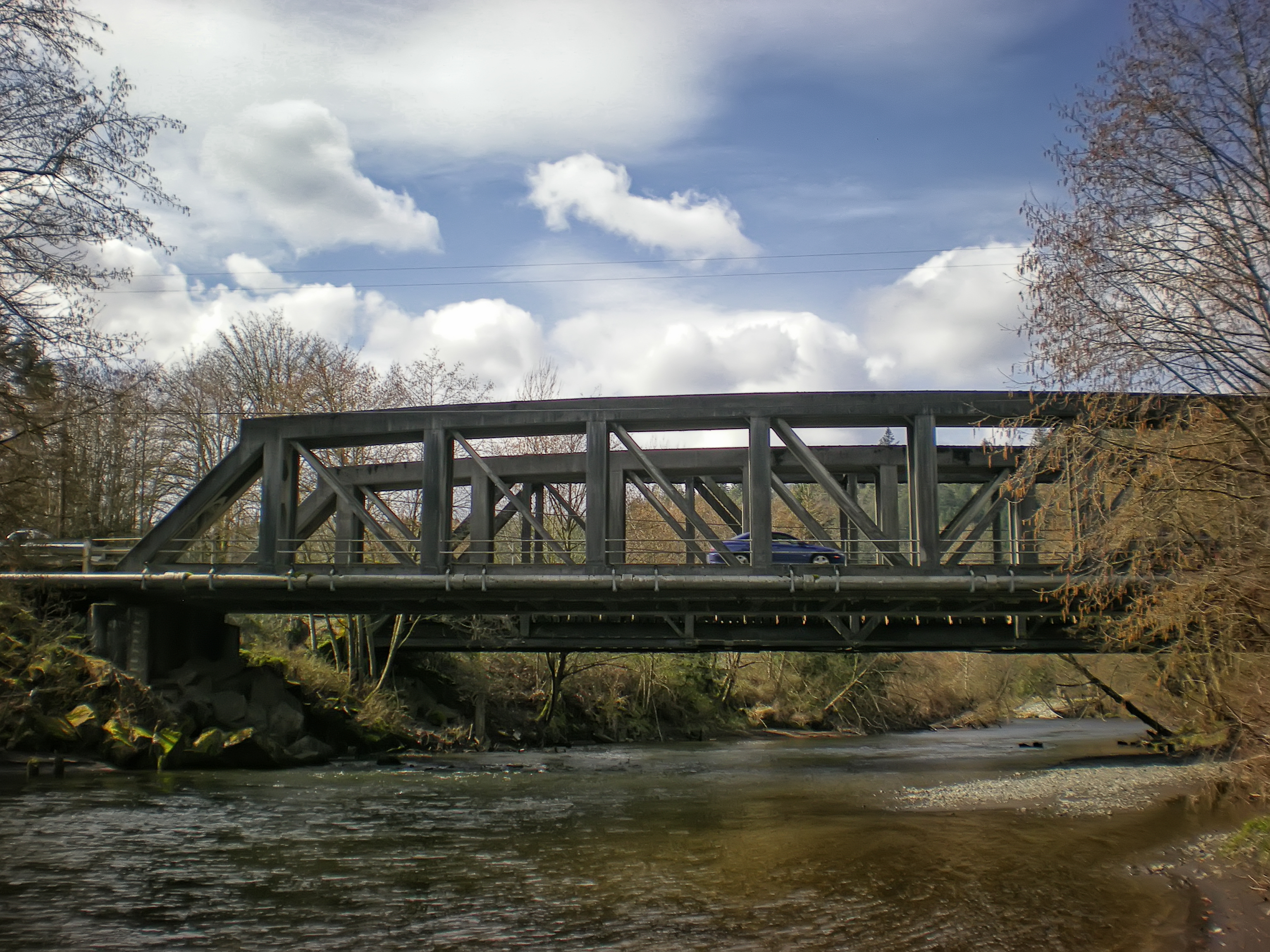
- Nearest city: Puyallup, Washington
- Architect: Homer M. Hadley, W. H. Witt Co.
- MPS: Historic Bridges/Tunnels in Washington State TR
- NRHP reference No.: 82004275
- Added to NRHP: July 16, 1982

Location
- Interactive map of McMillin Bridge

The McMillin Bridge (also known as the Puyallup River Bridge) is a concrete half-through truss bridge crossing the Puyallup River, in Pierce County, Washington, built in 1934.

The main span of the bridge is 170 feet (52 m) long, which was the longest beam span or concrete truss in the US when it was built. It was part of State Route 162 until it was replaced by a new span in 2015.

== Design ==
The bridge design uses a hollow-box system, which was suggested to the design company of W. H. Witt Company by Homer M. Hadley.

The bridge was then built by Dolph Jones.

The bridge was built to replace a steel span that had been washed out by the flooding river in 1933.

Because of economic conditions, the concrete design was chosen over a steel design, with a savings of $826, in addition to lower maintenance costs.

The bridge is unusual in that it combines concrete with the half-through truss design, which was usually built with steel.

== Construction ==
The previous bridge was damaged in 1933, but the replacement bridge was ready to open in 1934, despite the Great Depression.

== Historic preservation ==
The bridge was added to the National Register of Historic Places in 1982. It was saved from demolition after its replacement by a new bridge carrying State Route 162, which opened in 2015.

== See also ==
- List of bridges on the National Register of Historic Places in Washington (state)
- List of bridges documented by the Historic American Engineering Record in Washington (state)

== Sources ==
- Holstine, Craig; Hobbs, Richard (2005). Spanning Washington: Historic Highway Bridges of the Evergreen State. Washington State University Press. ISBN 0-87422-281-8.
