= Fairfax Bridge (Washington) =

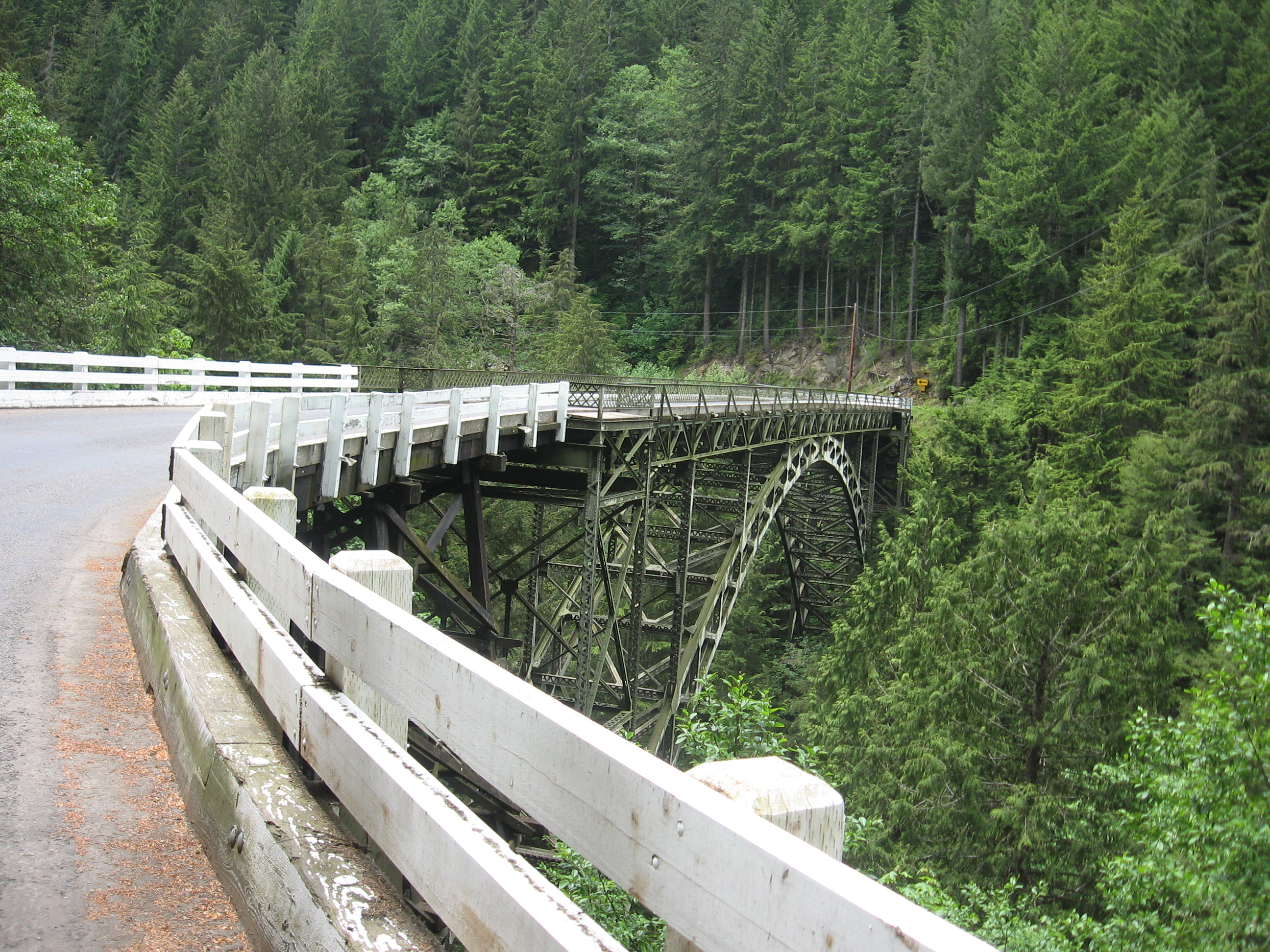
- Coordinates: 47°2′31.0″N 122°2′28.5″W
- Carries: 1 lane of SR 165
- Crosses: Carbon River
- Locale: Melmont, Washington
- Other name: O'Farrell Bridge
- Heritage status: NRHP

Characteristics
- Design: Three-hinged arch
- Material: Steel
- Total length: 494 feet (151 m)
- Clearance below: 250 feet (76 m)

History
- Construction end: 1921
- Construction cost: $80,000
- Closed: 2025 Due to Deterioration of Steel Until Further Notice
- Fairfax Bridge
- U.S. National Register of Historic Places
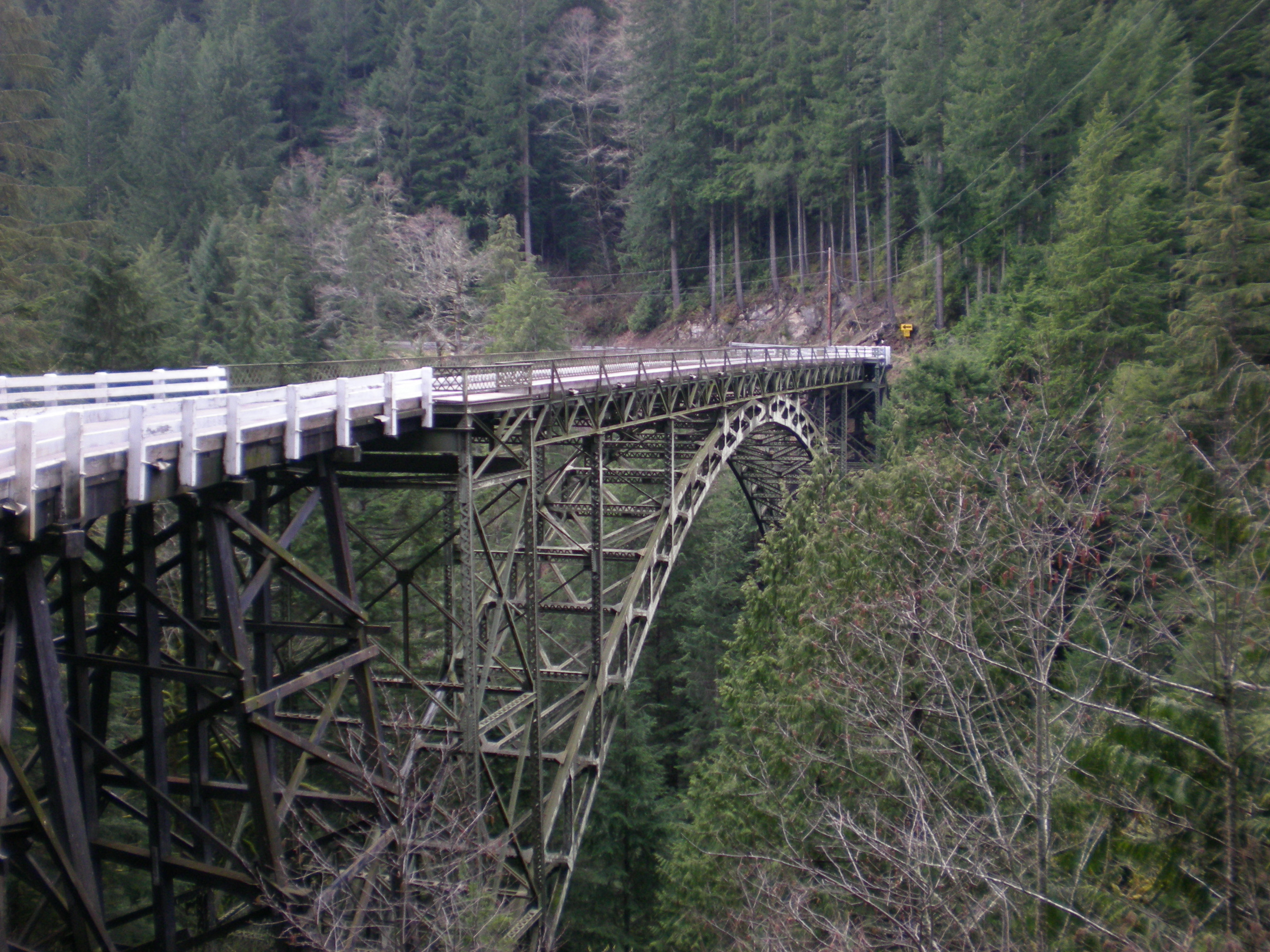
- MPS: Historic Bridges/Tunnels in Washington State TR
- NRHP reference No.: 82004273
- Added to NRHP: July 16, 1982

Location
- Interactive map of Fairfax Bridge

The Fairfax Bridge (formerly known as the O'Farrell Bridge) is a steel-lattice three-hinged arch bridge spanning the Carbon River on State Route 165 in Pierce County, Washington. Previous to the construction of the bridge in 1921, the only route south to the area around Fairfax was by train or by walking to Melmont. At a total cost of $80,000, the bridge's deck sits 250 feet (76 m) above the river. Being a single-lane bridge, vehicles were required to yield to oncoming traffic already on the bridge.

The bridge was permanently closed in 2025 due to its poor condition. The state plans on constructing a replacement bridge and demolishing the Fairfax Bridge.

== Structure ==
The 494-foot-long (151 m) bridge has a 240-foot (73 m) three-hinged braced rib steel arch, two 14-foot-tall (4.3 m) steel towers, and 16 timber trestle approach spans. The chords of the ribs are composed of channels. They are braced with two angles that are latticed in a Warren truss configuration. The vertical members of the towers and spandrel columns are made up of two latticed channels. The 17.4-foot-wide (5.3 m) roadway rests on a Warren stiffening truss. The Minneapolis Steel and Machinery Company provided the steel for the project. The arches sit on concrete footings. The approaches and the deck were reconstructed in 1945.

View of the Fairfax Bridge, or SR 165, in 1921.

The Fairfax Bridge is one of two three-hinged lattice arches remaining within the state. In his book Bridge Engineering, John Alexander Low Waddell explains the reason for the paucity of arches in the United States. "Arches are employed very generally in Europe on account of their superior appearance as compared with simple-truss bridges, and because of the powerful influence of the old masonry arch upon the minds of European bridge designers, regardless of the consideration of economy. American engineers, on the other hand, have been indifferent to the question of aesthetics, and have preferred simple spans to arches mainly for reasons of simplicity and economy, but sometimes on account of their greater rigidity. Another reason why the arch has not been used much in American practice is that the conditions, which make it economical, are not met with as frequently in this country as in Europe. For deep gorges with rocky sides, or for shallow streams with rock bottom and natural abutments, arches are eminently proper and economical." The conditions that made the bridge type economical in Europe were mirrored in the deep canyon of the Carbon River.

== Construction ==
In 1921, a riveted steel arch was built jointly by the county and state across the Carbon River providing the link which enabled the construction of the first road to Fairfax. Previously a train, which passed through Fairfax only twice a day, was the town's primary route to the outside world. The only alternative to the train was walking to Melmont, where there was a wagon road to other towns. The construction of the steel arch, which was purported to be the highest span in the state at the time of its construction, was a vital transportation link to this remote town.

The bridge was added to the National Register of Historic Places in 1982.

== Closure ==
View of the Fairfax Bridge, or SR 165, in 1921.

The Washington State Department of Transportation (WSDOT) banned wide loads from using the bridge in 2009 and expanded its restrictions to exclude all commercial vehicles in 2013. A weight limit of 16,000 pounds (7,300 kg) was instituted in 2024 due to signs of advanced deterioration. The wooden deck was replaced in May 2023, but further repairs have not been funded.

The bridge was closed to vehicle and pedestrian traffic on April 14, 2025, after WSDOT inspections had found further corrosion and damage and determined that there was immediate safety concerns. The closure was made permanent on April 22, 2025. No public alternative route is available and access to the area is restricted to the use of locked logging roads.

In December 2025, WSDOT published a planning report for the next steps for the bridge. The report reviewed several options, including maintaining the bridge closure, building a replacement bridge, or building a new highway route that would not require a bridge. The two options that WSDOT decided to develop further are a new bridge north of the existing bridge, or maintaining the bridge closure and compensating property owners for loss of access. All options involve demolishing the Fairfax Bridge.

In December 2025, two Republican state lawmakers introduced a bill that would declare an emergency to waive environmental requirements for a potential replacement bridge, and appropriate funds collected by the Climate Commitment Act to be used for its construction.

== Gallery ==
HAER WASH,27-CARB.V,1- (sheet 1 of 3)

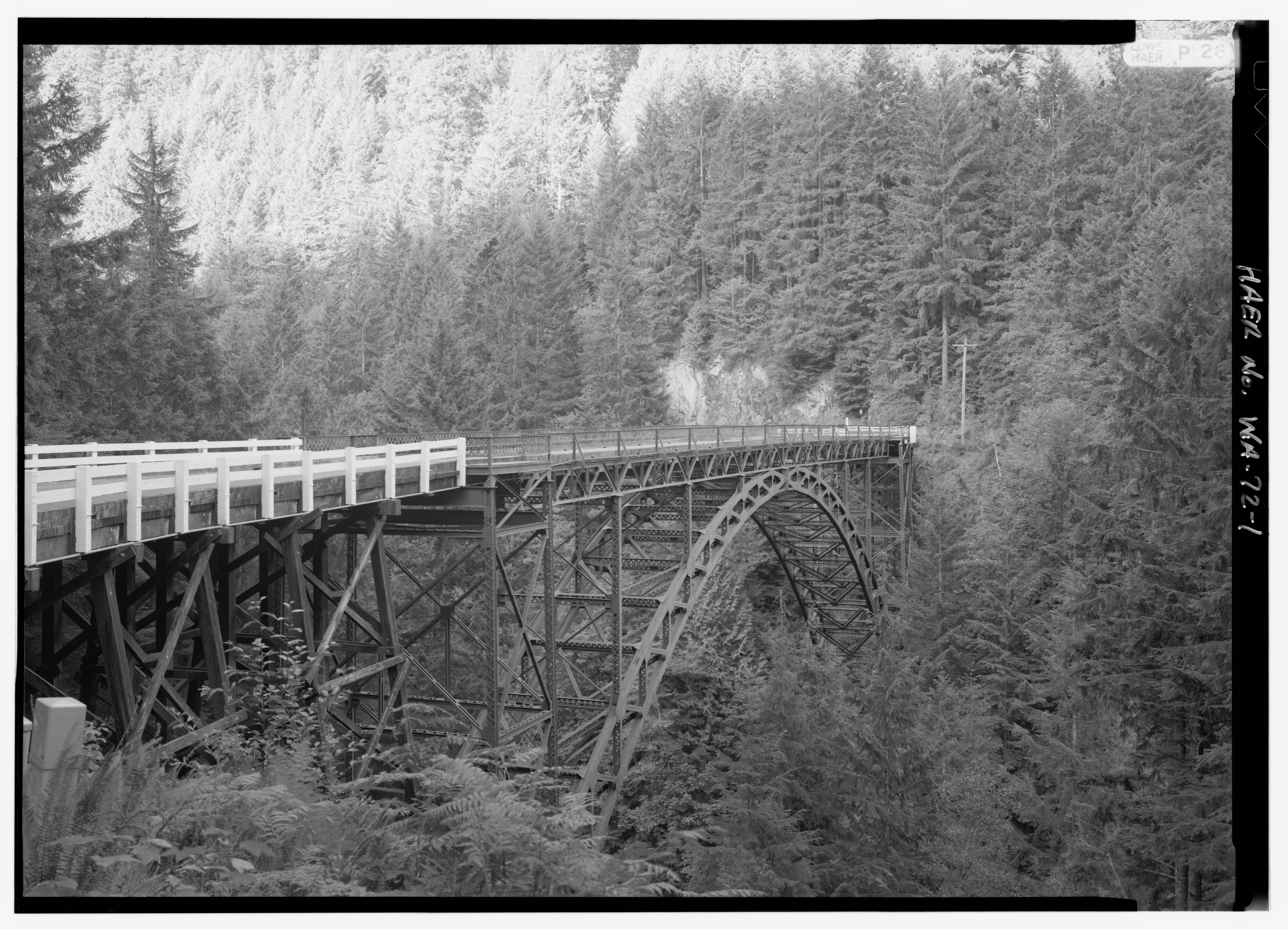
General view looking north

Looking up at the bridge in its opening year, 1921

A car parked across the bridge in its opening year, 1921

Looking down at the bridge in its opening year, 1921

Looking down the Carbon River Canyon at the freshly cleared trees

Looking across the Carbon River Canyon.

== See also ==
- List of bridges documented by the Historic American Engineering Record in Washington (state)
- List of bridges in the United States by height
- List of bridges on the National Register of Historic Places in Washington (state)

== Sources ==
- Holstine, Craig; Hobbs, Richard (2005). Spanning Washington: Historic Highway Bridges of the Evergreen State. Washington State University Press. ISBN 0-87422-281-8.
