= Chinook Pass Entrance Arch =

- U.S. National Register of Historic Places
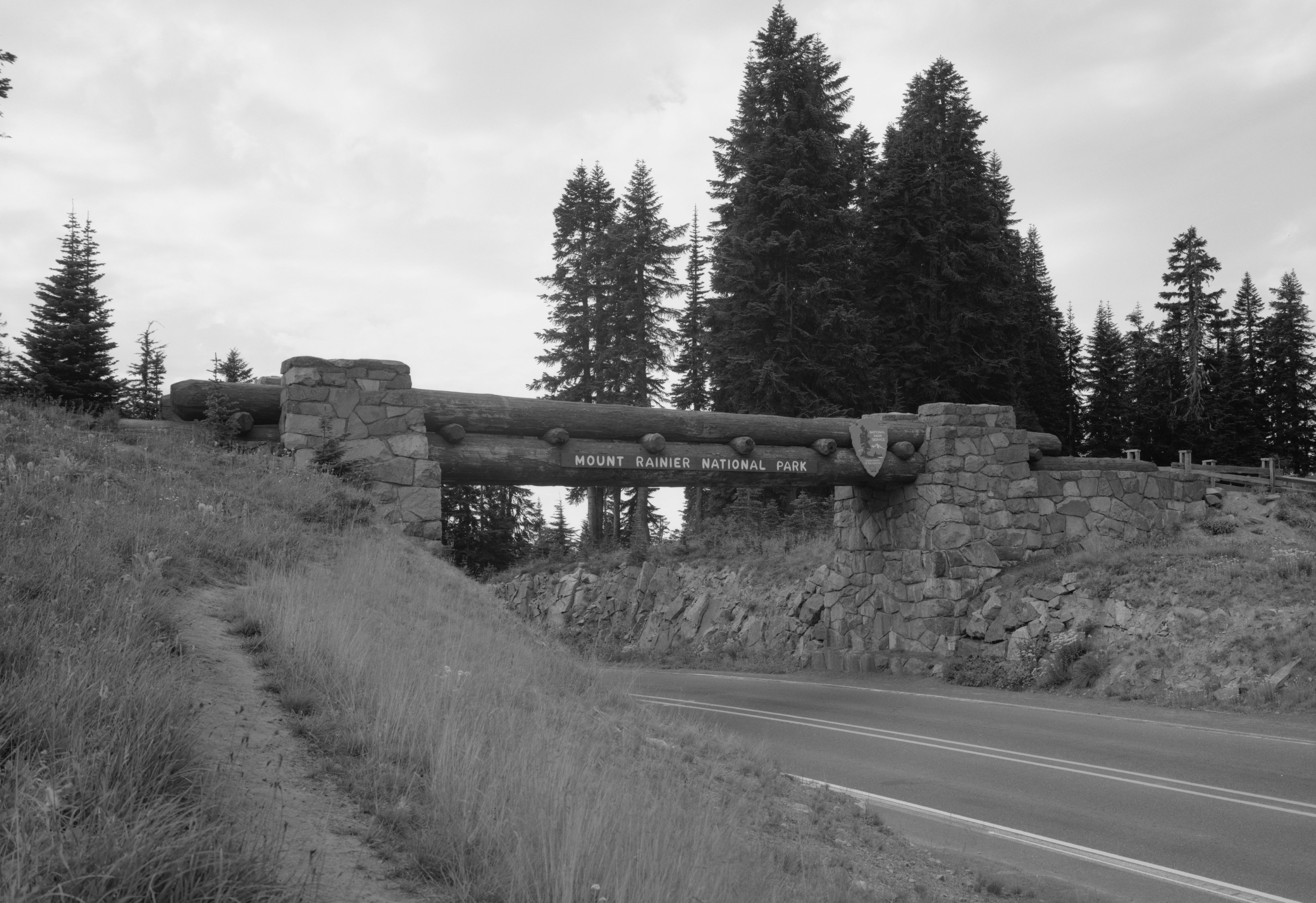

- Location within Washington (state)
- Location: Mount Rainier National Park, Chinook Pass Entrance, Washington
- Coordinates: 46°52′20″N 121°30′52″W
- Area: less than one acre
- Built: 1936
- Architectural style: Rustic style
- MPS: Mount Rainier National Park MPS
- NRHP reference No.: 91000202
- Added to NRHP: March 13, 1991

The Chinook Pass Entrance Arch marks the east entrance to Mount Rainier National Park. The rectangular log entry arch is one of several placed at the entrances to the park. It was designed in 1933 by the National Park Service Branch of Plans and Designs, and was built in 1936 by the Civilian Conservation Corps. The arch consists of two stone abutments carrying horizontal logs over the road. The arch functions as a bridge, carrying a horse trail, which is now part of the Pacific Crest Trail.

The Chinook Pass arch was placed on the National Register of Historic Places on March 13, 1991. It is part of the Mount Rainier National Historic Landmark District, which encompasses the entire park and which recognizes the park's inventory of Park Service-designed rustic architecture.

== See also ==
- List of bridges documented by the Historic American Engineering Record in Washington (state)
