= White River High School (Washington) =

Coordinates: 47°08′44″N 122°04′24″W

- (T'kopechuck)

Location
- 26928 120th St E Buckley, Washington 98321; United States

Information
- Type: Public Secondary
- Established: 1908
- School district: White River School District
- Grades: 9–12
- Gender: Co-Ed
- Enrollment: 1,351 (2023-2024)
- Colors: Maroon & Gold
- Mascot: Hornets
- Newspaper: Sting News
- Website: http://wrhs.whiteriver.wednet.edu/

White River High School is a public secondary school located on an 84-acre (34 ha) site just outside Buckley, Washington, United States. Before 1949, it was known as "Buckley High School" but with a merger with "Enumclaw High School" in neighboring Enumclaw, the school became known as White River. In 1952, the voters (especially the Chamber of Commerce) of the City of Enumclaw voted to form their own district.

== Facilities ==
In September 2003, White River moved into a new 240,000-square-foot (22,000 m^{2}) facility. The facility was designed by INTEGRUS Architecture and landscape architects Cascade Design Collaborative, Inc. The design focuses on separating the school into five career path sections—arts and communications, health and human services, business and marketing, science and natural resources, and engineering and technology—for upper classmen and three core class sections for underclassmen. The lunch area is at the center of the school, surrounded by the offices, library, credit union (now defunct) and counseling center.

Awards

- 2005 James D. MacConnell Award, recognizing excellence in planning educational facilities that promote student achievement and help serve the needs of the students and faculty, as well as the community. The award is given by the Council of Educational Facilities Planners International (CEFPI).
- 2005 Civil Design Merit Award from the Washington State AIA, which recognized public projects with great civic design.

== Athletics ==
In 2006, White River joined the newly formed 3A South Puget Sound League.

Sports:

- Baseball
- Basketball [Boys']
- Basketball [Girls']
- Cross Country
- Fastpitch
- Football
- Golf
- Soccer [Boys']
- Soccer [Girls']
- Special Olympics
- Tennis [Boys']
- Tennis [Girls']
- Track
- Volleyball
- Wrestling [Boys']
- Wrestling [Girls']

== Notable alumni ==
- Will Jacobsen, professional basketball player
