= Buckley, Washington =

- City
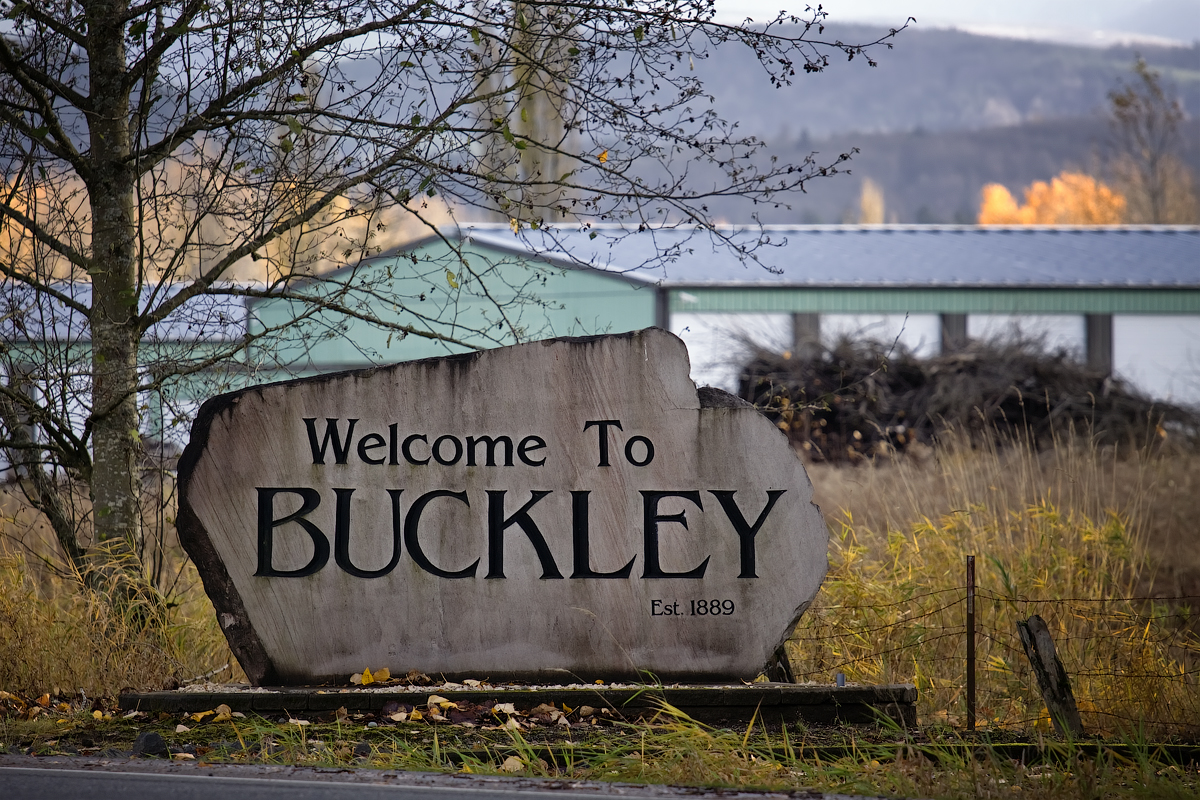
- Buckley Welcome Sign

- Location of Buckley, Washington
- Coordinates: 47°09′39″N 122°01′00″W
- Country: United States
- State: Washington
- County: Pierce
- Incorporated: 1889

Government
  - Type: Mayor–council
  - Mayor: Beau Burkett

Area
  - Total: 3.97 sq mi (10.29 km^{2})
  - Land: 3.86 sq mi (10.00 km^{2})
  - Water: 0.11 sq mi (0.29 km^{2})
- Elevation: 732 ft (223 m)

Population (2020)
  - Total: 5,114
  - Estimate (2021): 5,321
  - Density: 1,325/sq mi (511.4/km^{2})
- Time zone: UTC-8 (PST)
  - Summer (DST): UTC-7 (PDT)
- ZIP Code: 98321
- Area code(s): 360, 564
- FIPS code: 53-08570
- GNIS feature ID: 2409929
- Website: cityofbuckley.com

Buckley is a city in Pierce County, Washington, United States, founded in 1882. The population was 5,114 at the 2020 census. Buckley lies on the White River below Mount Rainier and is known for hosting an annual festival named the Log Show.

== History ==
- 1856 Decisive battle of the Puget Sound War fought at Connell's Prairie, 6 miles (10 km) west of Buckley. It was significant because it boosted the morale of the settlers because it was such a great victory with no casualties to the regulars or volunteers.
- 1875
  - Coal discovered at Wilkeson
  - Jeremiah 'Jerry' Stilley, first permanent non-Indian resident, settled West of town.
- 1877 Railroad built from Tacoma to Wilkeson to transport coal.
- 1882 Town named "Perkin's Prairie"
- 1884 Northern Pacific built railroad spur track from Cascade Junction (between South Prairie and Buckley) to Perkin's Prairie. Town given name "White River Siding" by railroad men.
- 1885 Town's first store erected by "Dad" Chamberlain.
- 1887
  - Town renamed "Buckley" for J.M. Buckley, Northern Pacific Railway district superintendent.
  - First school established.
- 1888 Town site platted by Alexander and Mary Wickersham. Lumber and shingle mills are established.
- 1889
  - First post office established.
  - District Court appointed five men as trustees of the Town of Buckley.
  - First newspaper printed and published in Buckley - The Buckley Banner.
- 1890: Town incorporated by electorate.
- 1891: Land donated for Buckley cemetery.
- 1892
  - May 5 Business District almost wiped out fire. Started on second story of the Buckley Lumber Store. Many brick buildings built after this fire still stand on Main Street.
  - June 17 New school built at present site of White River School District building on A Street.
  - First permanent church built.
  - World's Fair in Chicago, Illinois - Buckley Mills sell wood, shingles, and supplies to be used at the World's Fair Exhibit Buildings
  - First organized water system established.
- 1893
  - February 24 Fire Department in Buckley was established.
- 1898 Business district razed by fire. First high school classes held, building erected.
- 1902
  - Addition built on schoolhouse.
  - First library established.
- 1905 First high school graduation held.

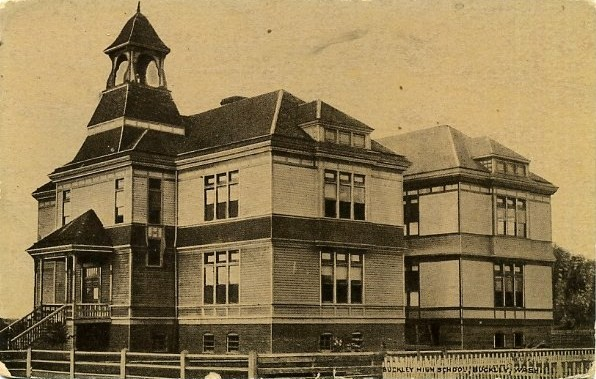
Buckley High School, about 1912

- 1907
  - Gravity water system built; water stored in reservoir still in use by town.
  - First general use of electricity.
- 1909
  - School burned to ground.
  - Town established fire department to replace Columbia Hose Company, a private fire-fighting group.
- 1910 New brick school built on A Street.
- 1911
  - White River Power Plant completed.
  - Present town hall built.
- 1912 Plank streets replaced by paving.
- 1914 Wickersham elementary school built.
- 1920 Large section of business district leveled by fire..
- 1939
  - Rainier School officially opened.
  - Work commenced on Mud Mountain Dam on White River.
- 1942 Mud Mountain Dam completed.
- 1944 Buckley railroad logging ended with closure of Buckley Logging Company mill.
- 1946 City limits extended to include Rainier School and farms south of town.
- 1947
  - Last company-operated coal mining discontinued.
- 1949 Buckley and Enumclaw school districts consolidated.
- 1951 Rural Fire District No. 12 organized.
- 1952
  - New fire station built.
  - Sewage disposal plant built.
- 1953
  - Wickersham school annex built.
  - White River School District (Buckley-Enumclaw) de-consolidated.
- 1956
  - New gymnasium built at high school.
- 1957
  - Town established natural gas utility.
- 1959 Northern Pacific railroad depot torn down.
- 1974 Buckley Annual Log Show starts.
- 2003 White River High School moved to a new location.

== Geography ==
Buckley is located on the south side of the White River near the communities of Enumclaw, Bonney Lake, and Wilkeson. The White River forms the border between King and Pierce counties.

According to the United States Census Bureau, the city has a total area of 3.95 square miles (10.23 km^{2}), of which, 3.87 square miles (10.02 km^{2}) is land and 0.08 square miles (0.21 km^{2}) is water.

=== Climate ===
According to the Köppen Climate Classification system, Buckley has a warm-summer Mediterranean climate, abbreviated "Csb" on climate maps.

== Demographics ==
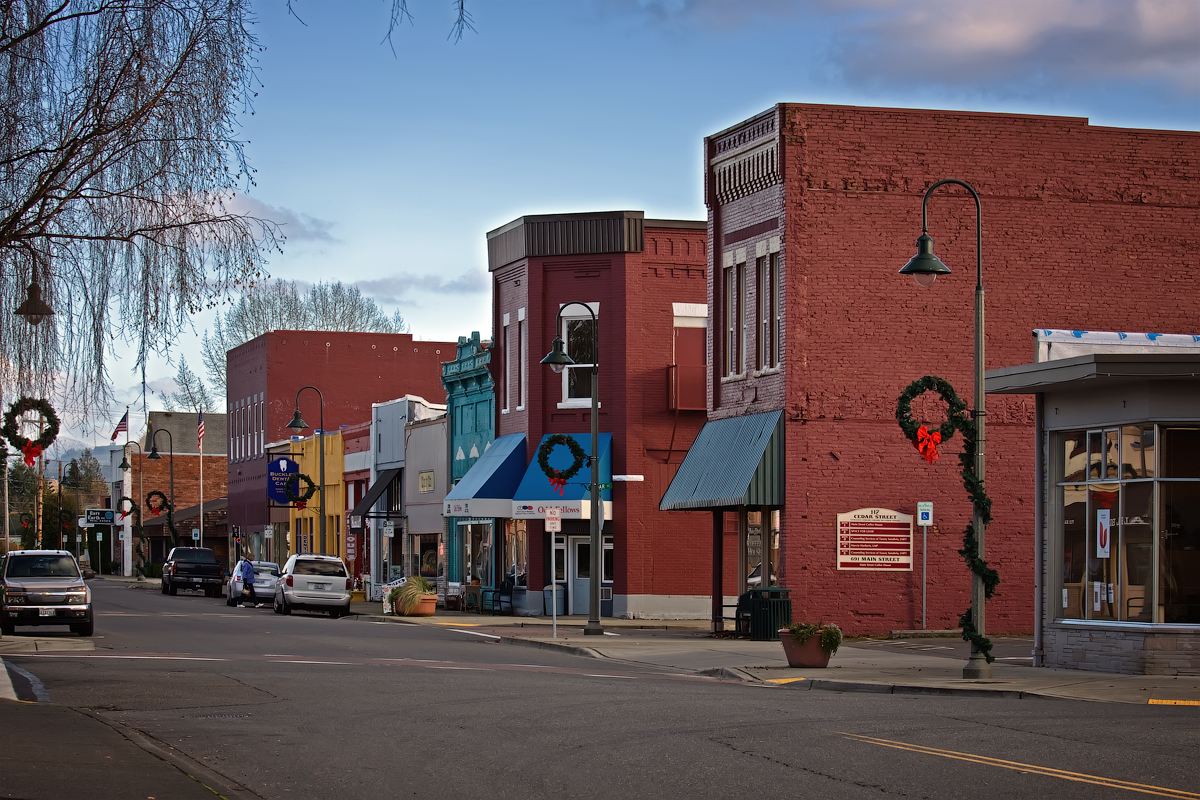
Main St. Buckley, WA

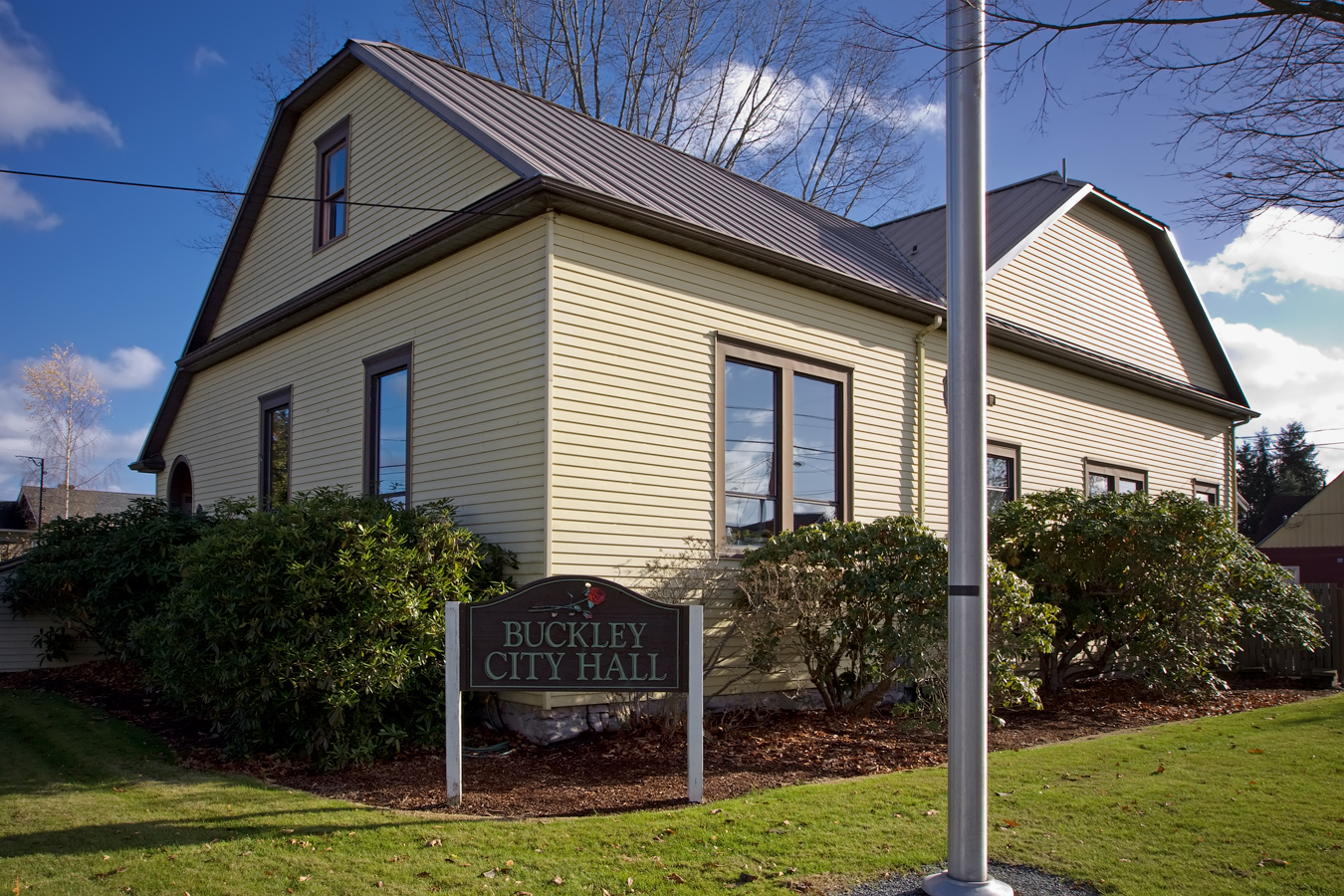
Buckley City Hall

Historical population
Census	Pop.	Note	%±
1890	878		—
1900	1,014		15.5%
1910	1,272		25.4%
1920	1,119		−12.0%
1930	1,052		−6.0%
1940	1,170		11.2%
1950	2,705		131.2%
1960	3,538		30.8%
1970	3,446		−2.6%
1980	3,143		−8.8%
1990	3,516		11.9%
2000	4,145		17.9%
2010	4,354		5.0%
2020	5,114		17.5%
2021 (est.)	5,321		4.0%
U.S. Decennial Census; 2020 Census

=== 2020 census ===
As of the 2020 census, Buckley had a population of 5,114. The median age was 37.8 years, 24.2% of residents were under the age of 18, and 16.4% of residents were 65 years of age or older. For every 100 females there were 97.7 males, and for every 100 females age 18 and over there were 95.5 males age 18 and over. The 2020 census reported that 92.2% of residents lived in urban areas, while 7.8% lived in rural areas.

There were 1,851 households in Buckley, of which 37.2% had children under the age of 18 living in them. Of all households, 51.6% were married-couple households, 15.0% were households with a male householder and no spouse or partner present, and 23.4% were households with a female householder and no spouse or partner present. About 22.5% of all households were made up of individuals and 10.6% had someone living alone who was 65 years of age or older.

There were 1,956 housing units, of which 5.4% were vacant. The homeowner vacancy rate was 1.4% and the rental vacancy rate was 4.2%.

Racial composition as of the 2020 census
Race	Number	Percent
White	4,390	85.8%
Black or African American	35	0.7%
American Indian and Alaska Native	75	1.5%
Asian	65	1.3%
Native Hawaiian and Other Pacific Islander	17	0.3%
Some other race	102	2.0%
Two or more races	430	8.4%
Hispanic or Latino (of any race)	289	5.7%

=== 2010 census ===
As of the 2010 census, there were 4,354 people, 1,591 households, and 1,049 families residing in the city. The population density was 1,125.1 inhabitants per square mile (434.4/km^{2}). There were 1,669 housing units at an average density of 431.3 per square mile (166.5/km^{2}). The racial makeup of the city was 93.0% White, 0.6% African American, 0.8% Native American, 0.8% Asian, 0.1% Pacific Islander, 1.2% from other races, and 3.4% from two or more races. Hispanic or Latino of any race were 3.1% of the population.

There were 1,591 households, of which 33.7% had children under the age of 18 living with them, 48.6% were married couples living together, 11.5% had a female householder with no husband present, 5.8% had a male householder with no wife present, and 34.1% were non-families. 26.3% of all households were made up of individuals, and 11.6% had someone living alone who was 65 years of age or older. The average household size was 2.50 and the average family size was 3.00.

The median age in the city was 39.9 years. 22.5% of residents were under the age of 18; 8.9% were between the ages of 18 and 24; 25.4% were from 25 to 44; 30% were from 45 to 64; and 13% were 65 years of age or older. The gender makeup of the city was 50.3% male and 49.7% female.

=== 2000 census ===
As of the 2000 census, there were 4,145 people, 1,396 households, and 995 families residing in the city. The population density was 1,072.7 people per square mile (414.6/km^{2}). There were 1,472 housing units at an average density of 380.9 per square mile (147.2/km^{2}). The racial makeup of the city was 93.78% White, 0.63% African American, 1.13% Native American, 0.77% Asian, 0.17% Pacific Islander, 0.55% from other races, and 2.97% from two or more races. Hispanic or Latino of any race were 1.81% of the population.

There were 1,396 households, out of which 38.5% had children under the age of 18 living with them, 54.2% were married couples living together, 12.3% had a female householder with no husband present, and 28.7% were non-families. 22.1% of all households were made up of individuals, and 7.2% had someone living alone who was 65 years of age or older. The average household size was 2.65 and the average family size was 3.12.

In the city, the population was spread out, with 26.4% under the age of 18, 7.4% from 18 to 24, 32.4% from 25 to 44, 24.8% from 45 to 64, and 9.0% who were 65 years of age or older. The median age was 36 years. For every 100 females, there were 102.3 males. For every 100 females age 18 and over, there were 106.9 males.

The median income for a household in the city was $49,453, and the median income for a family was $54,900. Males had a median income of $43,409 versus $29,688 for females. The per capita income for the city was $19,744. About 3.6% of families and 8.3% of the population were below the poverty line, including 6.4% of those under age 18 and 4.9% of those age 65 or over.

== Infrastructure ==
=== Transportation ===
Buckley is bisected by State Route 410, a major highway that crosses the Cascades at Chinook Pass and connects the Tacoma area to Yakima. It intersects State Route 165, a highway serving the Carbon River valley, south of town. The Foothills Trail, a non-motorized trail, travels through Buckley and connects the community to Puyallup and Enumclaw. A bridge over the White River for the trail opened in 2024 and became the sole means of access between Buckley and Enumclaw after the bridge carrying State Route 410 was damaged and closed to traffic in August 2025.

=== Healthcare ===
The nearest general hospital is St. Elizabeth Hospital in Enumclaw.

== Notable people ==
- Blaine Larsen, country music artist
- Lucille Lund, actress
- Fences (band), Indie music artist
