= White River Bridge =

- U.S. National Register of Historic Places
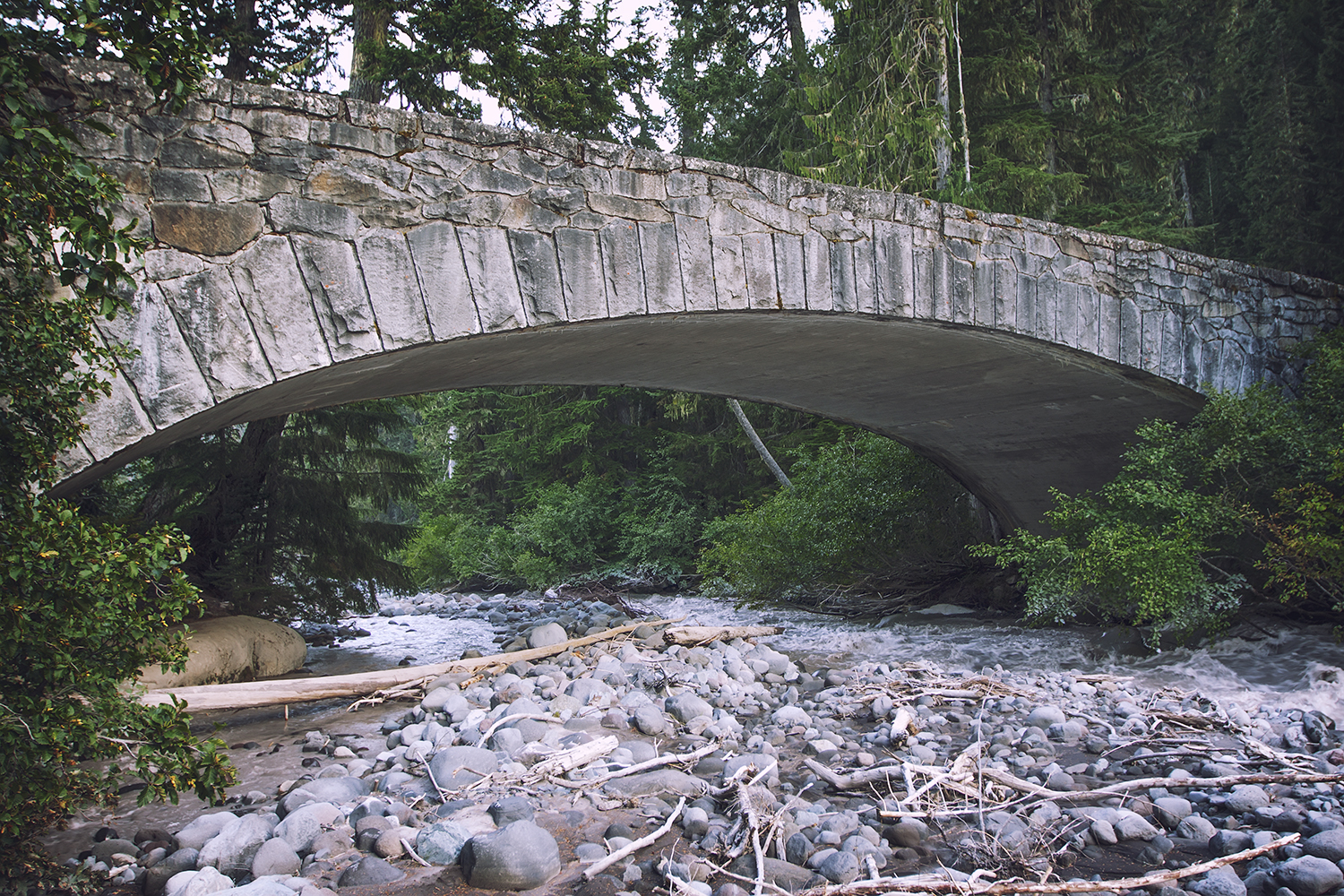

- Location within Washington (state)
- Nearest city: Randle, Washington
- Coordinates: 46°53′53″N 121°37′08″W
- Area: less than one acre
- Built: 1929
- Architectural style: Rustic style
- MPS: Mount Rainier National Park MPS
- NRHP reference No.: 91000200
- Added to NRHP: March 13, 1991

The White River Bridge was built in 1929 in Mount Rainier National Park as part of the Yakima Park Road project. The new road was planned to open up access to the northeastern portion of the park. The bridge, spanning the White River, was built by contractor John D. Tobin of Portland, Oregon, who had previously built the Narada Falls Bridge and the Christine Falls Bridges, both listed on the National Register of Historic Places. Plans for the bridge were drawn by the National Park Service Branch of Plans and Designs in the National Park Service Rustic style, with construction supervision by NPS landscape architect Ernest A. Davidson. The three-centred arch spans 60 feet (18 m), with a stone-faced concrete structure.

The bridge was placed on the National Register of Historic Places on March 13, 1991. It is part of the Mount Rainier National Historic Landmark District, which encompasses the entire park and which recognizes the park's inventory of Park Service-designed rustic architecture.

== See also ==
- List of bridges documented by the Historic American Engineering Record in Washington (state)
