= Carbonado, Washington =

- Town
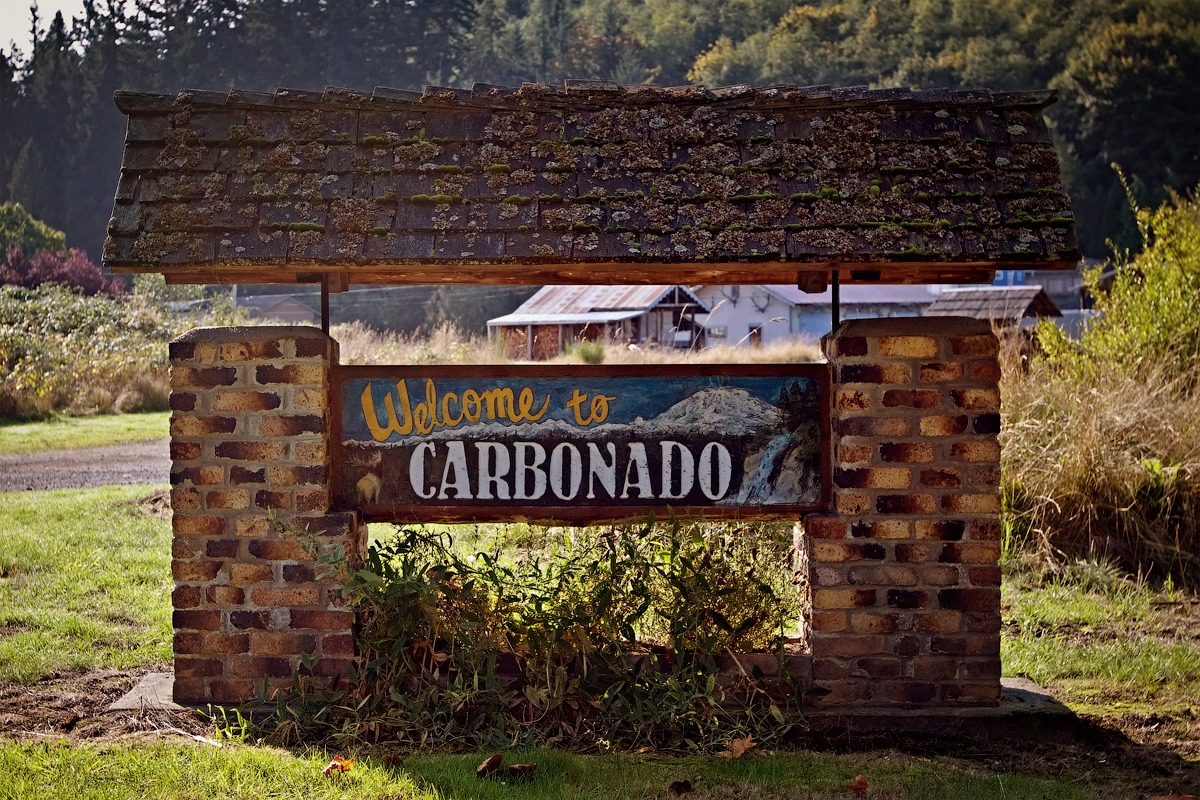
- Welcome sign in Carbonado

- Location of Carbonado, Washington
- Coordinates: 47°04′50″N 122°03′13″W
- Country: United States
- State: Washington
- County: Pierce

Government
  - Mayor: Kevin Vesey

Area
  - Total: 0.42 sq mi (1.08 km^{2})
  - Land: 0.42 sq mi (1.08 km^{2})
  - Water: 0 sq mi (0.00 km^{2})
- Elevation: 1,184 ft (361 m)

Population (2020)
  - Total: 734
  - Density: 1,765.4/sq mi (681.61/km^{2})
- Time zone: UTC-8 (Pacific (PST))
  - Summer (DST): UTC-7 (PDT)
- ZIP Code: 98323
- Area code(s): 360, 564
- FIPS code: 53-09970
- GNIS feature ID: 2413165
- Website: www.carbonado.org

Carbonado (/kɑːrbəˈneɪdoʊ/) is a town in Pierce County, Washington, United States. It is located near the Carbon River in the north of the county, approximately 50 miles (80 km) southeast of Seattle. Carbonado is the last town before entering Mount Rainier National Park Carbon River Entrance. The town also served as an important coal mining community in the late nineteenth and early twentieth centuries, when the town operated the largest coal mine in Pierce County. The population was 734 at the 2020 census.

== History ==
Carbonado was one of several in the Carbon River valley to be settled during an economic boom in the region. The boom was brought on by the demand for raw material in nearby growing cities such as Seattle and Tacoma. Starting with the town of Wilkeson and moving on through Burnett, Carbonado, Montezuma, Fairfax, and finally Manley Moore, these settlements sprawled up the valley to the very boundary of Mount Rainier National Park. Most of these towns were company towns, meaning that they specialized in the harvest of raw materials on the plot of land on which the town was situated, which was owned by a commercial company. Often – and such was the case of Carbonado – the company owned the houses and energy resources as well. The energy resource in Carbonado was also the raw material that the citizens of the company town were harvesting, coal.

More than 100 miners died in mining accidents in and around Carbonado, including 31 who were killed in an explosion in Carbon Hill Coal Company's Mine Number 7 on December 9, 1899.

During the time of the initial boom in the valley, Carbonado grew to rival the size of Tacoma. The railroad, integral to the transportation of people, supplies and exported materials, extended all the way up the valley, servicing the towns and several homesteads. These were settled predominantly by Polish immigrants, and supplied the towns down the valley with fresh milk and eggs. Two survive today, one known as Carbon River Ranch (the main house is the old Fairfax school and can be seen from Washington State Route 165) and the other formerly known as Huckle-Chuck. At Huckle-Chuck, the original house and one of the barns are still used and functional. At the peak of the boom both of these homesteads and the towns which they supplied were quite productive and lively.

However, the boom did not last as the economy suffered a downturn, and with it came the end of the need for the lower-grade coal being mined at Carbonado and the timber being harvested for use in the settlements further up the valley. Since the decline of the mining era, Carbonado has experienced extreme shrinking and small booms ultimately ending with a steady population. All of the current residents work elsewhere and what was once an economic center for the valley is now a residential community. The railroad also pulled out of the town. The Rails to Trails project has most of the actual rail line land in its possession.

The time that Carbonado did spend as a coal mining town is evidenced by the cemetery, abandoned mines, an overgrown coal slag pile, a school, and the company houses left behind. The cemetery holds the memories of older and more recent dead with many of the grave holders' family still living nearby. Huge concrete monoliths that once held that cables for the mining carts point straight towards the old mine shafts and openings and stand overgrown and now only utilized by the town's children. One hill in the town started out as the coal slag pile and now has been carpeted by ivy and trees. The school makes up what is known as the Carbonado Historical School District and grades K-8th still attend there. Many of the houses that the company built and originally owned still line main street. They look very similar to each other as was the style of the company builders at the time. Although many of the miners abandoned the town, the direct descendants of the original miners still live in some of the houses.

Carbonado was officially incorporated on September 13, 1948.

== Geography ==
According to the United States Census Bureau, the town has a total area of 0.42 square miles (1.09 km^{2}), all of it land.

== Demographics ==
Historical population
Census	Pop.	Note	%±
1890	705		—
1950	412		—
1960	424		2.9%
1970	394		−7.1%
1980	456		15.7%
1990	495		8.6%
2000	621		25.5%
2010	610		−1.8%
2020	734		20.3%
U.S. Decennial Census; 2020 Census

=== 2010 census ===
As of the 2010 United States census, there were 610 people, 208 households, and 153 families living in the town. The population density was 1,452.4 inhabitants per square mile (560.8/km^{2}). There were 218 housing units at an average density of 519.0 per square mile (200.4/km^{2}). The racial makeup of the town was 93.1% White, 0.7% African American, 1.0% Native American, 1.1% Asian, 0.2% Pacific Islander, 1.5% from other races, and 2.5% from two or more races. Hispanic or Latino of any race were 4.8% of the population.

There were 208 households, of which 39.9% had children under the age of 18 living with them, 57.7% were married couples living together, 6.7% had a female householder with no husband present, 9.1% had a male householder with no wife present, and 26.4% were non-families. 18.8% of all households were made up of individuals, and 5.8% had someone living alone who was 65 years of age or older. The average household size was 2.93 and the average family size was 3.37.

The median age in the town was 34.9 years. 43.2% of residents were under the age of 18; 9.3% were between the ages of 18 and 24; 27.2% were from 25 to 44; 24.7% were from 45 to 64; and 10.3% were 65 years of age or older. The gender makeup of the town was 52.5% male and 47.5% female.

=== 2000 census ===
As of the 2000 United States census, there were 621 people, 200 households, and 158 families living in the town. The population density was 1,527.9 people per square mile (584.8/km^{2}). There were 210 housing units at an average density of 516.7 per square mile (197.8/km^{2}). The racial makeup of the town was 96.46% White, 0.48% Native American, 0.64% from other races, and 2.42% from two or more races. Hispanic or Latino of any race were 1.93% of the population.

There were 200 households, out of which 48.0% had children under the age of 18 living with them, 68.5% were married couples living together, 4.0% had a female householder with no husband present, and 21.0% were non-families. 17.5% of all households were made up of individuals, and 8.0% had someone living alone who was 65 years of age or older. The average household size was 3.11 and the average family size was 3.56.

In the town, the population was spread out, with 34.9% under the age of 18, 7.7% from 18 to 24, 29.8% from 25 to 44, 20.5% from 45 to 64, and 7.1% who were 65 years of age or older. The median age was 30 years. For every 100 females, there were 110.5 males. For every 100 females age 18 and over, there were 108.2 males.

The median income for a household in the town was $50,250. Males had a median income of $38,583 versus $24,821 for females. The per capita income for the town was $16,135. About 1.4% of families and 4.0% of the population were below the poverty line, including 2.9% of those under age 18 and none of those age 65 or over.

== Notable people ==
- Frank Robinson, founder and CEO of Robinson Helicopters, was born in Carbonado in 1930.
- Paul Strand, baseball pitcher, was born in Carbonado in 1893.
