= South Prairie, Washington =

Town in Pierce County, Washington, United States

- Town
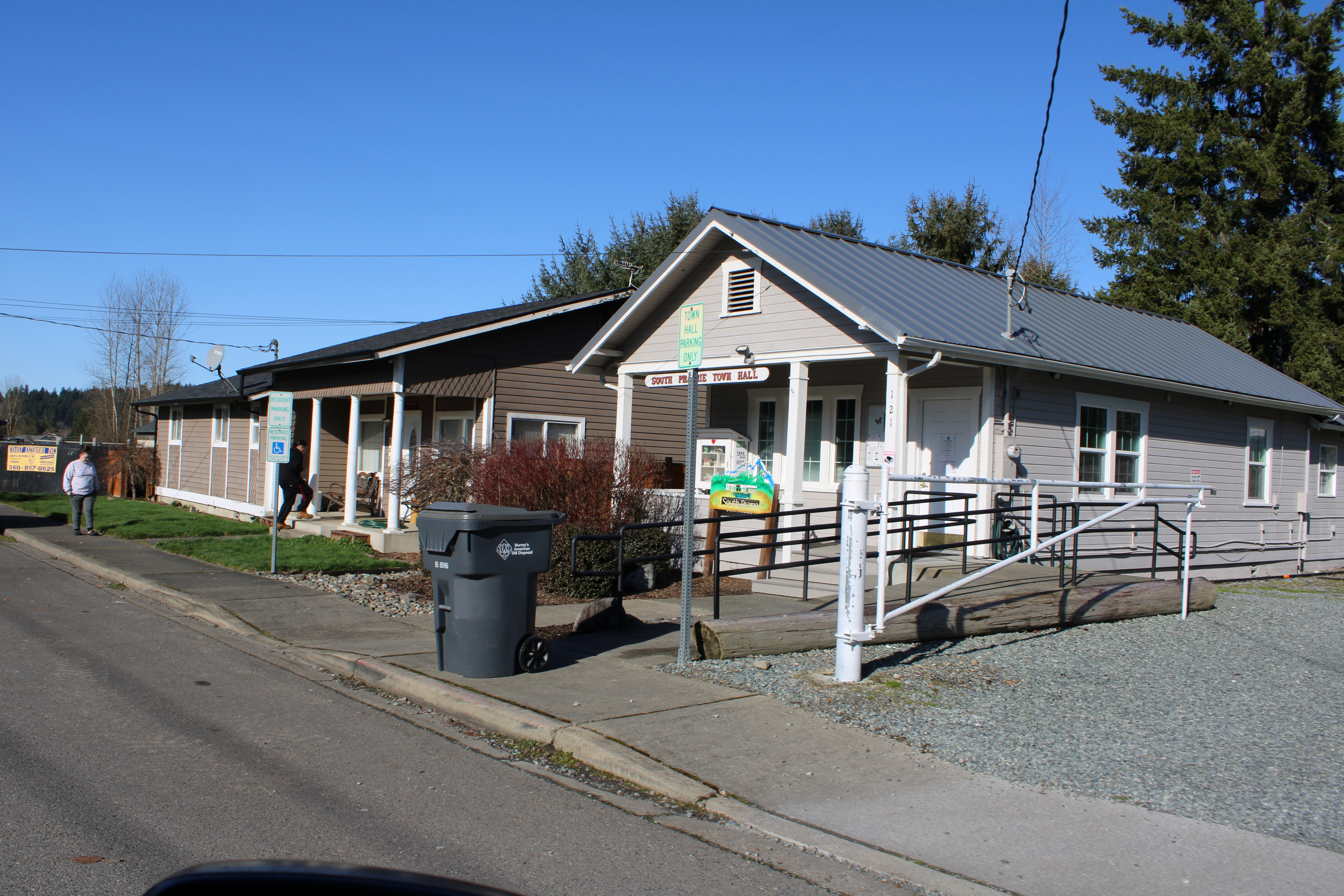
- South Prairie Town Hall, February 2024

- Location of South Prairie, Washington
- Coordinates: 47°08′14″N 122°05′38″W
- Country: United States
- State: Washington
- County: Pierce

Government
  - Type: Mayor–council
  - Mayor: Carolyn Norris

Area
  - Total: 0.39 sq mi (1.01 km^{2})
  - Land: 0.38 sq mi (0.99 km^{2})
  - Water: 0.0077 sq mi (0.02 km^{2})
- Elevation: 469 ft (143 m)

Population (2020)
  - Total: 373
  - Density: 1,156.7/sq mi (446.59/km^{2})
- Time zone: UTC-8 (Pacific (PST))
  - Summer (DST): UTC-7 (PDT)
- ZIP Code: 98385
- Area code: 360, 564
- FIPS code: 53-66045
- GNIS feature ID: 2413310
- Website: www.townofsp.com

South Prairie is a town in Pierce County, Washington, United States. The population was 373 at the 2020 census.

== History ==
South Prairie was platted in 1888 by Frank Bisson. It was named because of its location, south of Connell's and Porter's prairies. In 1885 its name was changed to "Cascade Junction," but residents resisted the change and it was officially incorporated as "South Prairie" on February 17, 1909.

== Geography ==
According to the United States Census Bureau, the town has a total area of 0.40 square miles (1.04 km^{2}), of which, 0.39 square miles (1.01 km^{2}) is land and 0.01 square miles (0.03 km^{2}) is water.

== Demographics ==
Historical population
Census	Pop.	Note	%±
1910	264		—
1920	215		−18.6%
1930	204		−5.1%
1940	226		10.8%
1950	207		−8.4%
1960	214		3.4%
1970	206		−3.7%
1980	202		−1.9%
1990	180		−10.9%
2000	382		112.2%
2010	434		13.6%
2020	373		−14.1%
U.S. Decennial Census; 2020 Census

=== 2010 census ===
As of the 2010 census, there were 434 people, 166 households, and 115 families living in the town. The population density was 1,112.8 inhabitants per square mile (429.7/km^{2}). There were 174 housing units at an average density of 446.2 per square mile (172.3/km^{2}). The racial makeup of the town was 92.4% White, 0.5% African American, 2.5% Native American, 0.7% Asian, 0.5% from other races, and 3.5% from two or more races. Hispanic or Latino of any race were 1.2% of the population.

There were 166 households, of which 36.1% had children under the age of 18 living with them, 56.6% were married couples living together, 7.8% had a female householder with no husband present, 4.8% had a male householder with no wife present, and 30.7% were non-families. 24.7% of all households were made up of individuals, and 8.4% had someone living alone who was 65 years of age or older. The average household size was 2.61 and the average family size was 3.15.

The median age in the town was 40.6 years. 25.8% of residents were under the age of 18; 6.7% were between the ages of 18 and 24; 22.5% were from 25 to 44; 33.8% were from 45 to 64; and 11.1% were 65 years of age or older. The gender makeup of the town was 51.8% male and 48.2% female.

=== 2000 census ===
As of the 2000 census, there were 382 people, 125 households, and 98 families living in the town. The population density was 938.3 people per square mile (359.7/km^{2}). There were 138 housing units at an average density of 339.0 per square mile (130.0/km^{2}). The racial makeup of the town was 93.98% White, 1.05% African American, 2.09% Native American, 1.31% Asian, and 1.57% from two or more races. Hispanic or Latino of any race were 0.79% of the population.

There were 125 households, out of which 44.8% had children under the age of 18 living with them, 68.0% were married couples living together, 4.8% had a female householder with no husband present, and 20.8% were non-families. 12.0% of all households were made up of individuals, and 3.2% had someone living alone who was 65 years of age or older. The average household size was 3.06 and the average family size was 3.40.

In the town, the age distribution of the population shows 33.0% under the age of 18, 4.7% from 18 to 24, 38.5% from 25 to 44, 16.8% from 45 to 64, and 7.1% who were 65 years of age or older. The median age was 32 years. For every 100 females, there were 108.7 males. For every 100 females age 18 and over, there were 100.0 males.

The median income for a household in the town was $50,250, and the median income for a family was $56,250. Males had a median income of $47,589 versus $37,250 for females. The per capita income for the town was $19,345. About 1.8% of families and 5.1% of the population were below the poverty line, including 4.5% of those under age 18 and 13.0% of those age 65 or over.

== See also ==
- List of municipalities in Washington
