= Carbon River =

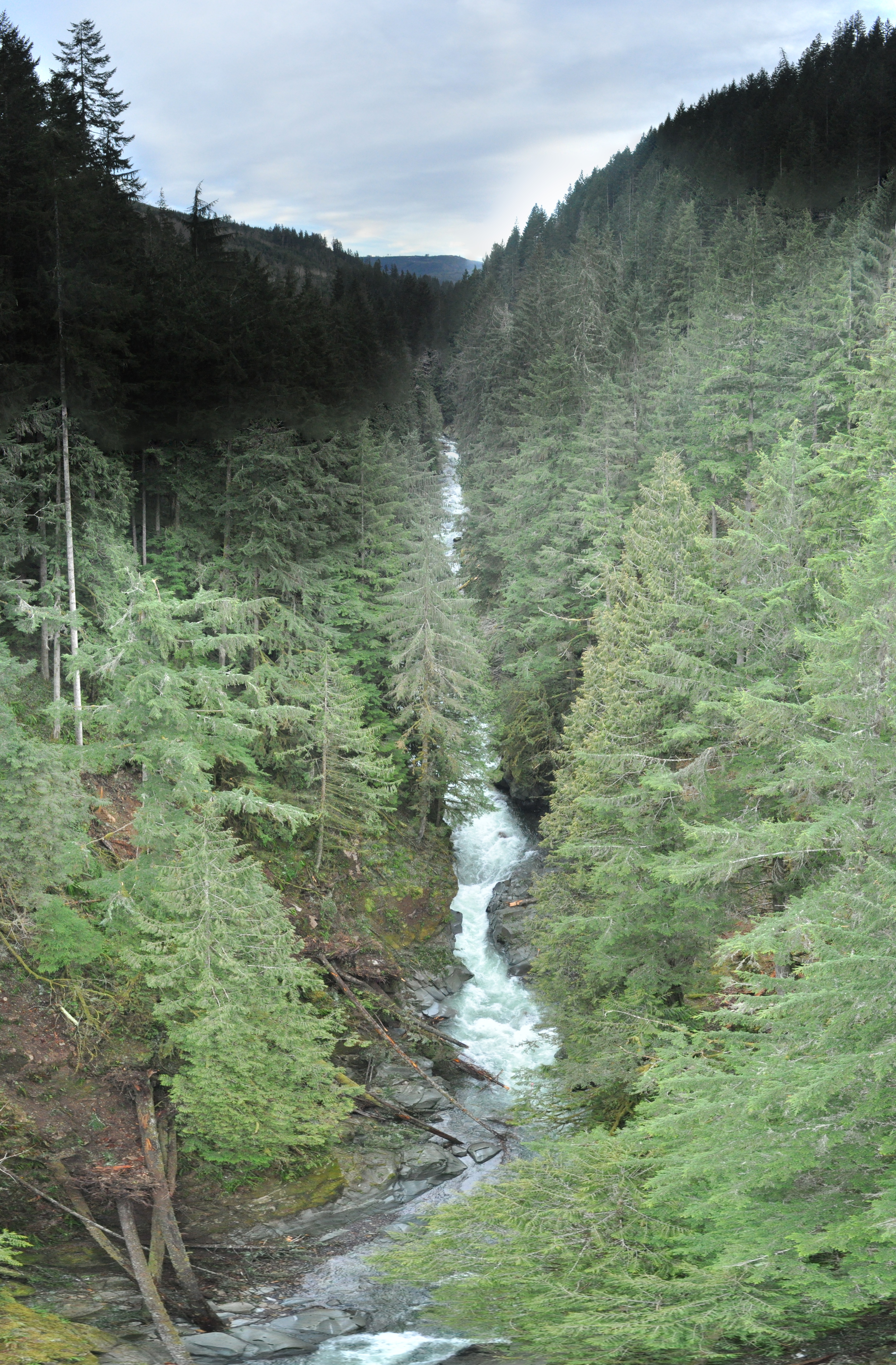
- The Carbon River near the town of Carbanado. Looking upstream from Fairfax Bridge.

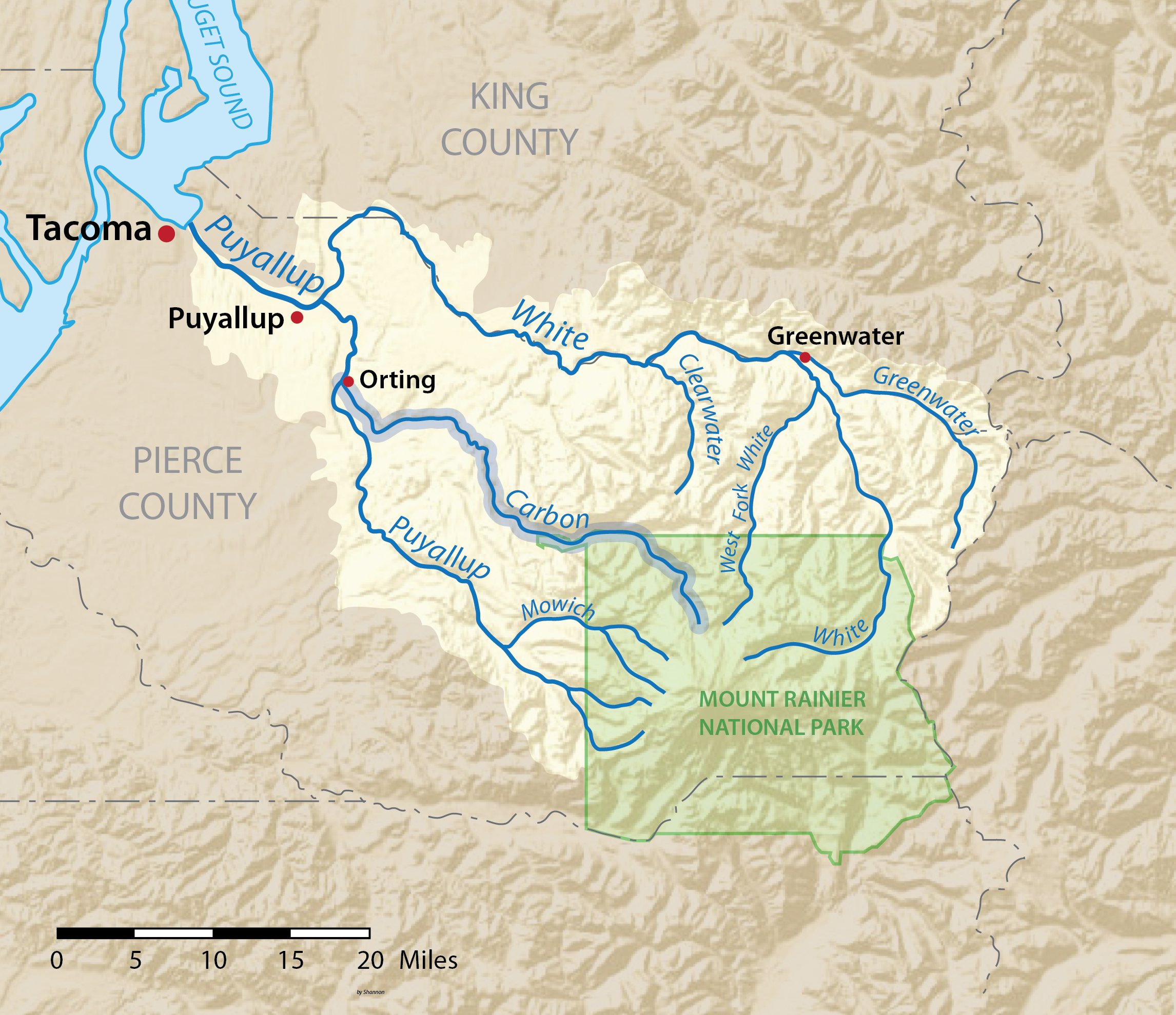
- The Carbon River is shown highlighted in the Puyallup River watershed

Location
- Country: United States
- State: Washington
- County: Pierce
- City: Orting

Physical characteristics
- Source: Mount Rainier
  - location: Carbon Glacier
  - coordinates: 46°56′38″N 121°47′24″W
  - elevation: 3,575 ft (1,090 m)
- Mouth: Puyallup River
  - location: Orting
  - coordinates: 47°7′50″N 122°13′58″W
  - elevation: 112 ft (34 m)
- Length: 30 mi (48 km)
- Basin size: 78.9 sq mi (204 km^{2})
- Discharge
  - location: Fairfax, WA
  - average: 427 cu ft/s (12.1 m^{3}/s)
  - minimum: 32 cu ft/s (0.91 m^{3}/s)
  - maximum: 12,000 cu ft/s (340 m^{3}/s)

Basin features
- Tributaries
  - left: Voight Creek
  - right: South Prairie Creek

The Carbon River is a river in the U.S. state of Washington. It flows about 30 miles (48 km) from its source, the Carbon Glacier on Mount Rainier, to join the Puyallup River at Orting.

Charles Wilkes called the river the "Upthascap River", but after the discovery of coal along its banks in 1876 the river was renamed "Carbon".

== Course ==
The source of the Carbon River is the Carbon Glacier on the north side of Mount Rainier in the Cascade Range. The river's upper reach is contained within Mount Rainier National Park. Some of the river's headwater tributary streams include Cataract Creek and Spukwush Creek. The Carbon River quickly enters a broad glacial valley in which it deposits thick layers of glacial sediment. This causes the river to meander and becomes braided.

After flowing by Mother Mountain on the west and Chenuis Mountain on the east, the Carbon River reaches Ipsut Creek and the national park campground of Ipsut Creek. This was also the end of the Carbon River Road entrance to Mount Rainier National Park before the 2006 floods washed out portions of the road. Below Ipsut Creek the Carbon River is joined by Chenuis Creek from the north and Green Creek from the south. Shortly after these confluences the river exits Mount Rainier National Park. Carbon Ridge and its high summit Old Baldy Mountain, lie to the north. Tolmie Creek, flowing down from Tolmie Peak, joins the Carbon River from the south.

Having run generally northwest, the Carbon River turns more directly west until it is joined by Evans Creek just before the small settlement of Fairfax. From Fairfax to Carbonado the Carbon River flows north through a narrow gorge, with Gleason Hill to the east and Wingate Hill to the west.

After passing Carbonado and receiving the tributary Lily Creek, the river valley broadens again and the Carbon River resumes its generally braided and meandering pattern. It turns west, flowing through an increasingly broad floodplain to the town of Crocker, where the river is joined by one of its main tributaries, South Prairie Creek. Just below Crocker another major tributary, Voight Creek, joins.

Below Crocker the Carbon River flows northwest to join the Puyallup River. The city of Orting is located at the confluence, in the floodplain between the Carbon and Puyallup rivers.

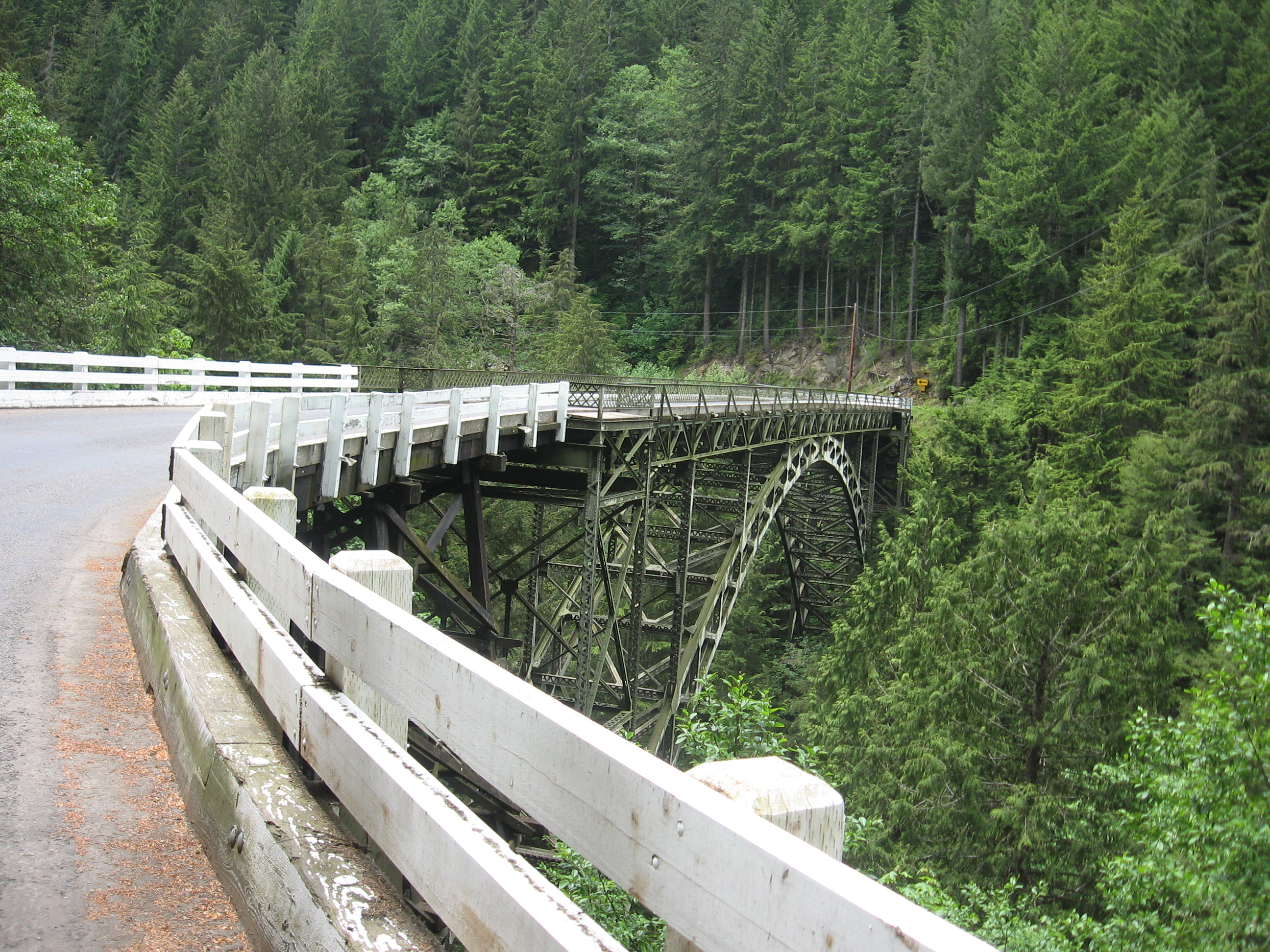
One-lane bridge on SR165 about 2 miles south of Carbonado, Washington, on the way to Mt. Rainier

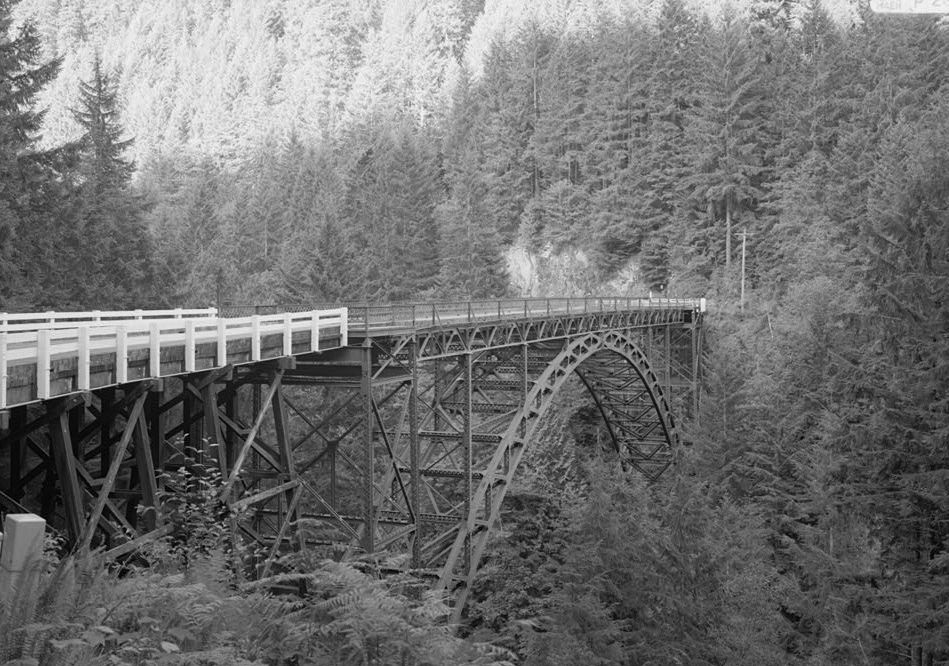
The 494-foot long Fairfax Bridge was the highest bridge in the state when it was built in 1921.

== Geology ==
Formed by glacial meltwater, the Carbon River contains a heavy load of sediment such as silt and gravel. After emerging from the Carbon Glacier the Carbon River flows through a broad glacier-carved valley where thick sediment deposits in the stream bed create sand and gravel bars causing the river to become complexly braided, meandering, and flood-prone. The river frequently shifts channels and creates new ones in its valley. Between Fairfax and Carbonado the Carbon River flows through a narrow gorge (right) before emerging into another broad flood-prone valley near Crocker and Orting.

== Natural history ==
The Carbon River valley receives about 70 to 90 inches (1,800 to 2,300 mm) of rain per year, resulting in a temperate rain forest environment.

== Natural hazards ==
=== Floods ===
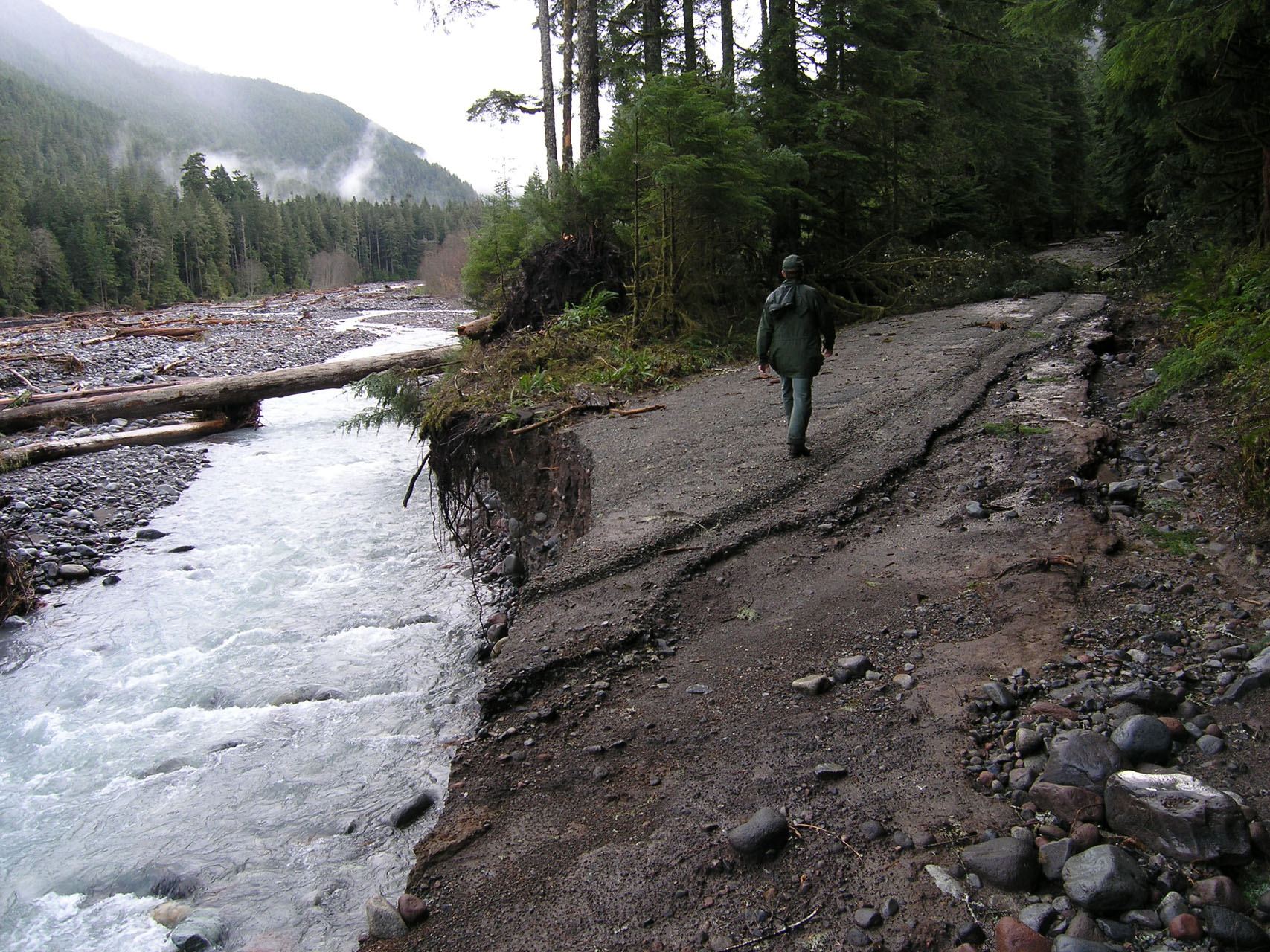
In some places, the 2006 flood of the Carbon River tore away large pieces of the Carbon River Road.

Flooding occurs frequently in the upper Carbon River valley. In 2006, a major flood resulted in the river forming new stream channels and in the process washing-out a portion of the Carbon River Road. The road is the main entrance to the northwestern part of Mount Rainier National Park. Part of the road became a new channel of the river. Other parts of the road were washed away.

As of 2008, the Carbon River Road was closed to motorized access at the entrance station. That added almost 11 miles (18 km) round trip for any hikes that formerly began at the Ipsut Creek Campground. The Ipsut Creek campground is permanently closed to vehicle camping, and requires a back country camping permit for overnight use. Flood and/or high water conditions continue to represent dangers to users and can occur with little warning.

=== Lahars ===
As with other rivers flowing from Mount Rainier's glaciers, the Carbon River valley is at risk of lahars.

== See also ==
- List of Washington rivers
