= Washington State Route 161 =

State highway in Pierce and King counties, Washington, US

State Route 161

- SR 161 highlighted in red

Route information
- Auxiliary route of SR 410
- Maintained by WSDOT
- Length: 36.25 mi (58.34 km)
- Existed: 1964–present

Major junctions
- South end: SR 7 near Eatonville
- SR 512 in Puyallup; SR 167 in Puyallup
- North end: SR 18 in Federal Way

Location
- Country: United States
- State: Washington
- Counties: Pierce, King

Highway system
- State highways in Washington; Interstate; US; State; Scenic; Pre-1964; 1964 renumbering; Former
← SR 160	→ SR 162

State Route 161 (SR 161) is a 36.25-mile-long (58.34 km) state highway serving Pierce and King counties in the U.S. state of Washington. The highway begins at SR 7 southwest of Eatonville and travels north as Meridian Avenue to Puyallup, becoming concurrent with SR 512 and SR 167. SR 161 continues northwest as the Enchanted Parkway to end at an intersection with SR 18 in Federal Way, west of Interstate 5 (I-5). The highway serves the communities of Graham and South Hill before reaching Puyallup and the communities of Edgewood, Milton, and Lakeland South before reaching Federal Way.

SR 161 was established during the 1964 highway renumbering, replacing three Secondary State Highways (SSHs): Secondary State Highway 5D (SSH 5D) and SSH 5G, both established in 1937, and SSH 5N, established in 1955. SSH 5D served as a connector between Federal Way and Puyallup and SSH 5G served as a connector between Puyallup and South Hill. SSH 5N connected Eatonville to South Hill and was extended south towards La Grande in 1967. SR 161 was moved onto a bypass of Puyallup in the 1980s and formed concurrencies with SR 167 and SR 512 as a result. As of 2013, projects to expand the highway in Edgewood and Milton and adding new offramps at the I-5 and SR 18 interchange are in progress.

== Route description ==
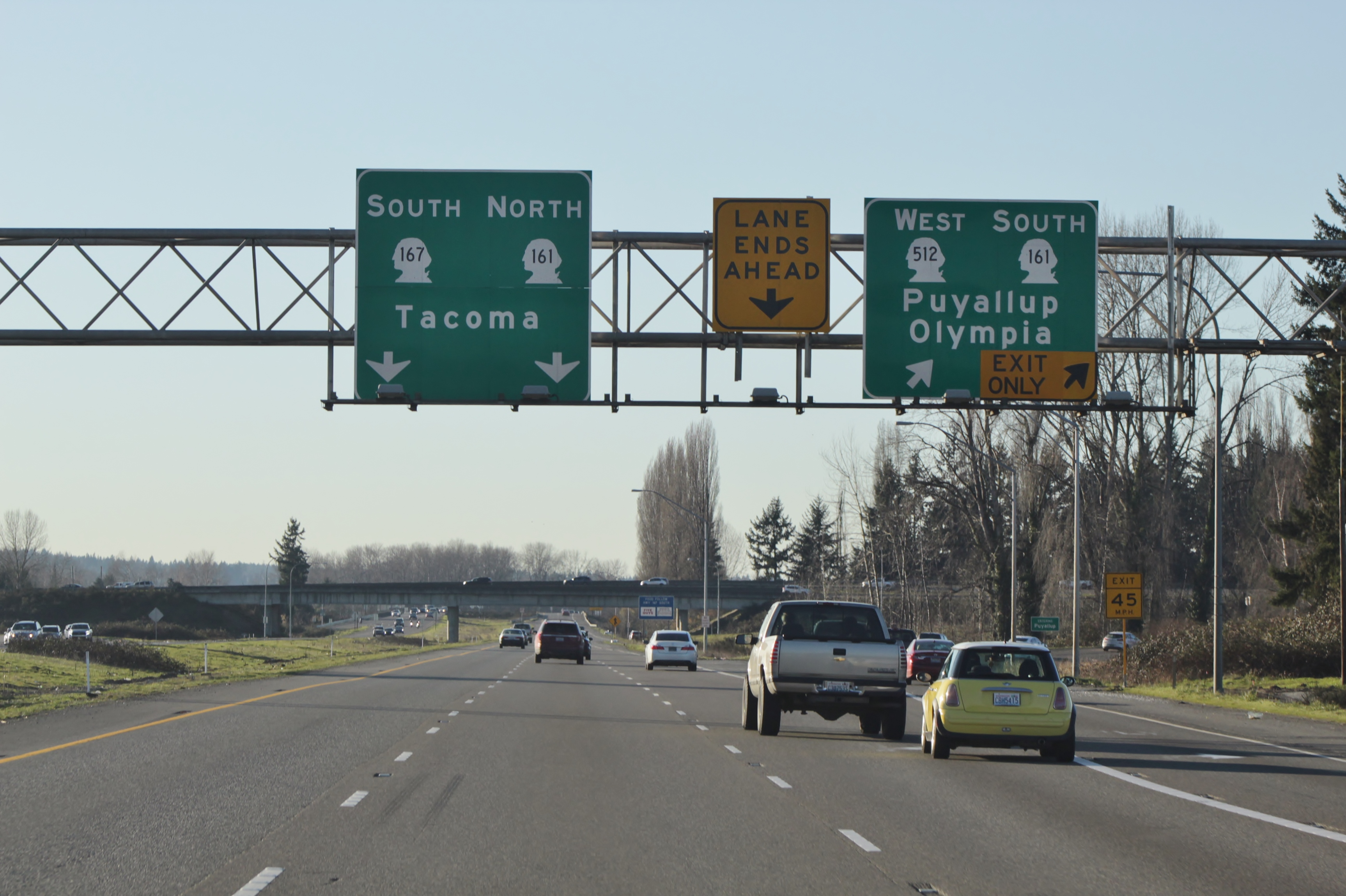
SR 161 and SR 167 in Puyallup

SR 161 begins southwest of Eatonville and north of La Grande in rural Pierce County at an intersection with SR 7. The highway travels northeast to pass the Charles Lathrop Pack Experimental and Demonstration Forest and cross the Little Mashel River into Eatonville. The roadway crosses the Mashel River into Downtown Eatonville, turning north onto Mashell Avenue and later Washington Avenue. SR 161 turns west onto Meridian Avenue north of Eatonville High School and leaves the city on a two-lane highway. Meridian Avenue, named for a meridian parallel to the Willamette Meridian, continues north through rural Pierce County, passing Clear Lake and Tanwax Lake, before entering the community of Graham and crossing a Tacoma Rail line near Graham-Kapowsin High School. SR 161 travels north and passes South Hill and Pierce County Airport (Thun Field) before entering Puyallup. The highway turns northwest at the South Hill Mall onto 31st Avenue and intersects the SR 512 freeway in a partial cloverleaf interchange, beginning a 3.41-mile-long (5.49 km) concurrency.

SR 161 and SR 512 travel north on a freeway in Puyallup, intersecting Meridian Street at the Puyallup Fairgrounds and Pioneer Avenue at a partial cloverleaf interchange. After the intersection with Pioneer Avenue, the freeway travels over a BNSF rail line that serves Puyallup station and crosses the Puyallup River before a trumpet interchange with SR 167. At the interchange, SR 512 ends and SR 161 northbound turns west on a 1.83-mile-long (2.95 km) wrong-way concurrency with SR 167, designated as traveling southbound. SR 161 turns north onto Meridian Avenue at Fort Malone as SR 167 travels south into Downtown Puyallup, and the highway continues north and crosses a Union Pacific rail line. Meridian Avenue continues north to form the boundary between Edgewood and Milton, where the highway intersects Milton Way, the former route of SR 514. SR 161 turns northwest into King County as the Enchanted Parkway, passing through Lakeland South and Wild Waves Theme Park before crossing over I-5. The Enchanted Parkway turns north into Federal Way and ends at an intersection with SR 18, located between SR 99 and I-5.

Every year, the Washington State Department of Transportation (WSDOT) conducts a series of surveys on its highways in the state to measure traffic volume. This is expressed in terms of annual average daily traffic (AADT), which is a measure of traffic volume for any average day of the year. In 2011, WSDOT calculated that between 340 and 99,000 vehicles per day used the highway, mostly in the Puyallup area.

== History ==
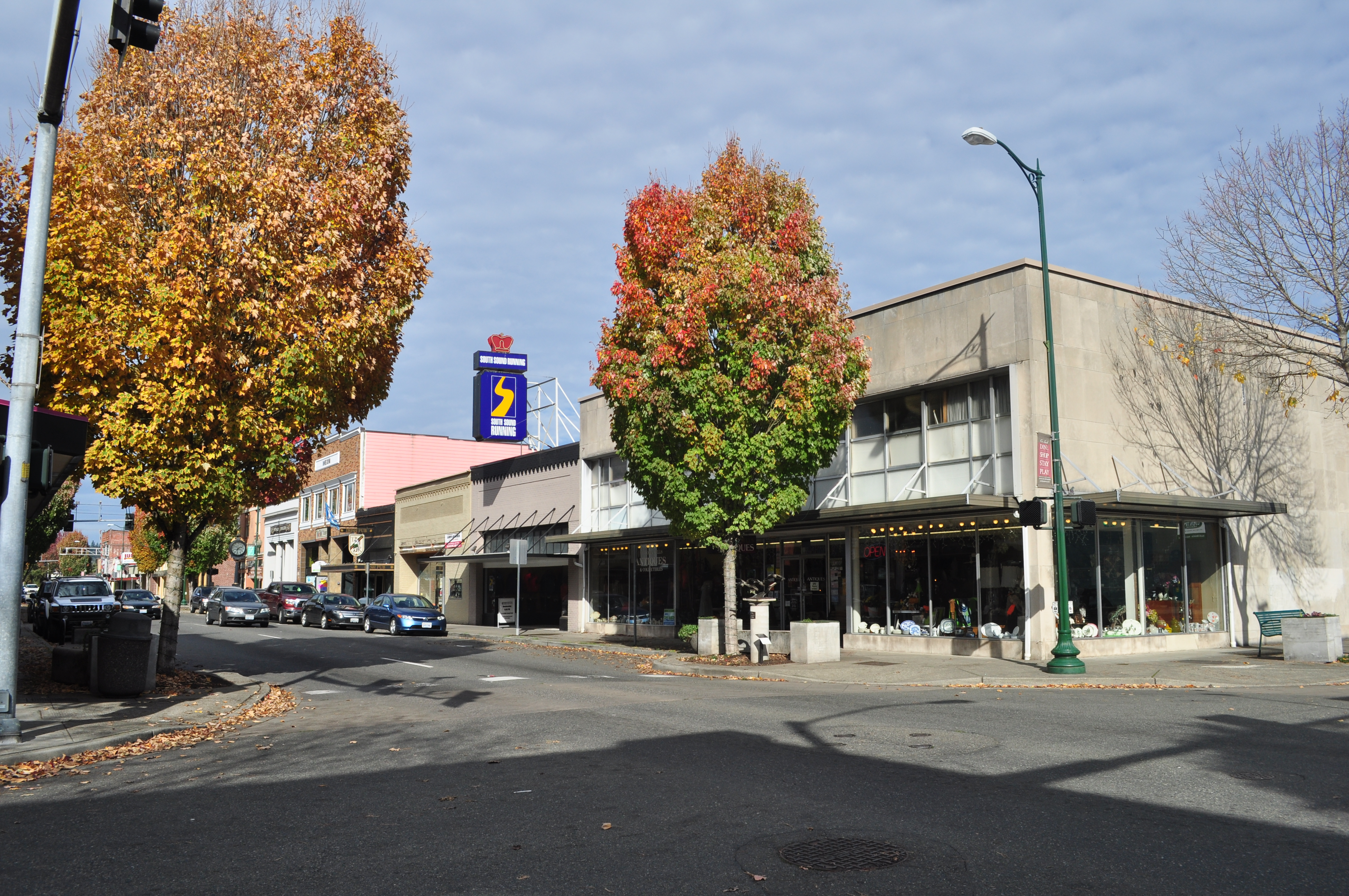
Meridian Street in downtown Puyallup, which formerly carried a section of SR 161

SR 161 was formed during the 1964 highway renumbering as the successor to SSH 5N from Primary State Highway 5 (PSH 5) north of La Grande to South Hill, SSH 5G from South Hill to U.S. Route 410 (US 410) in Puyallup, and SSH 5D from US 410 north of Puyallup to US 99 Federal Way. The highway was also concurrent with US 410, signed in 1926, between the eastern end of SSH 5G in Downtown Puyallup and the southern end of SSH 5D. SSH 5D and SSH 5G were established during the creation of the Primary and secondary state highways in 1937, and SSH 5N was established in 1955 to Eatonville and extended south to PSH 5 near La Grande in 1967 after SR 161 was created. The state government completed paving of the Graham–Puyallup section of Meridian in 1960.

SR 161, including the concurrency with US 410, was signed into law in 1970 as a highway extending from SR 7 near Eatonville to US 99. US 410 was replaced with an extension of SR 167 in the Tacoma area and US 12 east of the Cascade Mountains in 1967 and the highway was shortened from US 99 to SR 18 in 1971. SR 161 was moved east onto a bypass of Puyallup, creating concurrences with SR 512 and SR 167, in the late 1980s, and designated, within King County, as the Enchanted Parkway in 1987 as the last major revision to the highway. The Pierce County government and City of Eatonville proposed moving SR 161 to the Alder Cutoff Road south of the city, but it was not forwarded to the state legislature by the Washington State Transportation Improvement Board.

An extension of the Valley Freeway between Tacoma and Puyallup has been proposed since the 1990s and would create a new interchange with SR 161 north of the Puyallup River, but as of 2013 the freeway has not been built. The eastbound ramps at end of the concurrency between SR 161 and SR 167 was realigned in late 2008 to reduce congestion and started recent improvements to the highway. WSDOT is widening the Enchanted Parkway through the Edgewood and Milton area from 2 lanes to 4 lanes with wider shoulders and sidewalks to be completed by 2027. The interchange between I-5 and SR 18 was reconstructed with a new flyover ramp from westbound SR 18 to SR 161 that was completed in July 2012. Another ramp, from southbound I-5 to SR 161, was opened months later and is planned to be replaced with a ramp to South 356th Street that feeds into a roundabout with SR 161. The ramp had been proposed since the 1990s.

== Major intersections ==
County	Location	mi	km	Destinations	Notes
Pierce		0.00	0.00	SR 7 – Mt. Rainier, Tacoma	Southern terminus
Pierce	Puyallup	25.74– 25.83	41.42– 41.57	SR 512 west – Tacoma	Interchange; south end of SR 512 overlap
Pierce	Puyallup			South end of freeway	
Pierce	Puyallup	26.31– 27.01	42.34– 43.47	Meridian Street South – Puyallup	
Pierce	Puyallup	27.16– 27.70	43.71– 44.58	Pioneer Avenue East	
Pierce	Puyallup	28.04– 29.15	45.13– 46.91	SR 167 north to SR 410 east – Seattle, Yakima	North end of SR 512 overlap; southern terminus of SR 512; South end of SR 167 overlap
Pierce	Puyallup			North end of freeway	
Pierce	Puyallup	29.87	48.07	SR 167 south – Puyallup, Tacoma	North end of SR 167 overlap
Pierce	Edgewood	33.31	53.61	Milton Way	Former SR 514
King	Federal Way	36.25	58.34	SR 18 to I-5 – Auburn, North Bend, Seattle	Northern terminus
1.000 mi = 1.609 km; 1.000 km = 0.621 mi: Concurrency terminus
