= Washington State Route 702 =

State highway in Pierce County, Washington, US

State Route 702
- 352nd Street

Route information
- Auxiliary route of SR 7
- Maintained by WSDOT
- Length: 9.32 mi (15.00 km)
- Existed: ca. 1931–present

Major junctions
- West end: SR 507 in McKenna
- East end: SR 7 in rural Pierce County

Location
- Country: United States
- State: Washington
- County: Pierce

Highway system
- State highways in Washington; Interstate; US; State; Scenic; Pre-1964; 1964 renumbering; Former
← SR 599	→ SR 704

State Route 702 (SR 702) is a 9.32-mile (15.00 km) long two-lane state highway located entirely in Pierce County, Washington, United States. The highway travels through rural Pierce County, and has existed since at least 1931 as State Highway 10, then as Secondary State Highway 5J until the 1964 state highway renumbering when it was renumbered to SR 702. The roadway the highway is routed along, continues east to an interchange with SR 161.

== Route description ==
State Route 702 (SR 702) starts at a t intersection with SR 507, east of McKenna Elementary School, headed easterly along 352nd Street. The highway travels through sections of lightly populated rural Pierce County, with sections of alternating houses and small sections of heavily wooded land. The highway terminates at SR 7, however the roadway continues east past the intersection. The entire route is a two lane undivided highway with a 55 miles per hour (89 km/h) speed limit posted.

Every year the Washington State Department of Transportation (WSDOT) conducts a series of surveys on its highways in the state to measure traffic volume. This is expressed in terms of annual average daily traffic (AADT), which is a measure of traffic volume for any average day of the year. In 2009, WSDOT calculated that as few as 4,400 cars traveled over the highway at the eastern terminus at SR 7, and as many as 8,600 cars at the western terminus at SR 507.

== History ==
The roadway linking McKenna to now SR 7 has existed since at least 1931, then designated State Highway 10, and by 1939 the highway designation had been changed to Secondary State Highway 5J (SSH 5J). This number remained until the 1964 state highway renumbering, where the number was changed to the current SR 702. The highways SR 702 have connected to also been renumbered over the years, the western highway being numbered SSH 5H, and the highway on the east was formerly designated Primary State Highway 5.

In February 2010, Representative Tom Campbell secured funding to install a traffic light at the eastern terminus, claiming it "will save lives and support jobs." Two roundabouts are planned to be built in 2024 to replace existing uncontrolled intersections at Harts Lake Road and 40th Avenue.

== Major intersections ==
The shield of former SSH 5J

The entire highway is in Pierce County.

Location	mi	km	Destinations	Notes
McKenna	0.00	0.00	SR 507 (Spanaway McKenna Highway) – Yelm, Roy	At-grade intersection, western terminus
	9.32	15.00	SR 7 (Mountain Highway) – Elbe, Elk Plain	At-grade intersection; eastern terminus; road continues east to SR 161
1.000 mi = 1.609 km; 1.000 km = 0.621 mi
