= Washington State Route 512 =

State highway in Pierce County, Washington, US

State Route 512

- Map of Pierce County in western Washington with SR 512 in red.

Route information
- Maintained by WSDOT
- Length: 12.06 mi (19.41 km)
- Existed: 1964–present

Major junctions
- West end: I-5 in Lakewood
- SR 7 in Parkland; SR 161 in Puyallup
- East end: SR 161 / SR 167 in Puyallup

Location
- Country: United States
- State: Washington
- County: Pierce

Highway system
- State highways in Washington; Interstate; US; State; Scenic; Pre-1964; 1964 renumbering; Former
← SR 510	→ SR 513

State Route 512 (SR 512) is a suburban state-maintained freeway in Pierce County, Washington, United States. It travels 12 miles (19 km) from west to east, connecting Interstate 5 (I-5) in Lakewood to SR 7 in Parkland and SR 167 in Puyallup. The freeway travels north–south through Puyallup, concurrent with SR 161.

The freeway follows the route of several county roads that were incorporated into Secondary State Highway 5G (SSH 5G) in 1937. The highway was renumbered to SR 512 in 1964 and gradually replaced by a freeway that was constructed between 1959 and 1973. The Puyallup section was initially built as a two-lane expressway until further funding was allocated by the state government to complete it as a four-lane freeway in 1976.

Further projects widened sections of SR 512 and added new interchanges to address increased demand caused by urban development along the freeway. Recent proposals have included interchange upgrades and the addition of high-occupancy vehicle lanes (HOV lanes).

== Route description ==
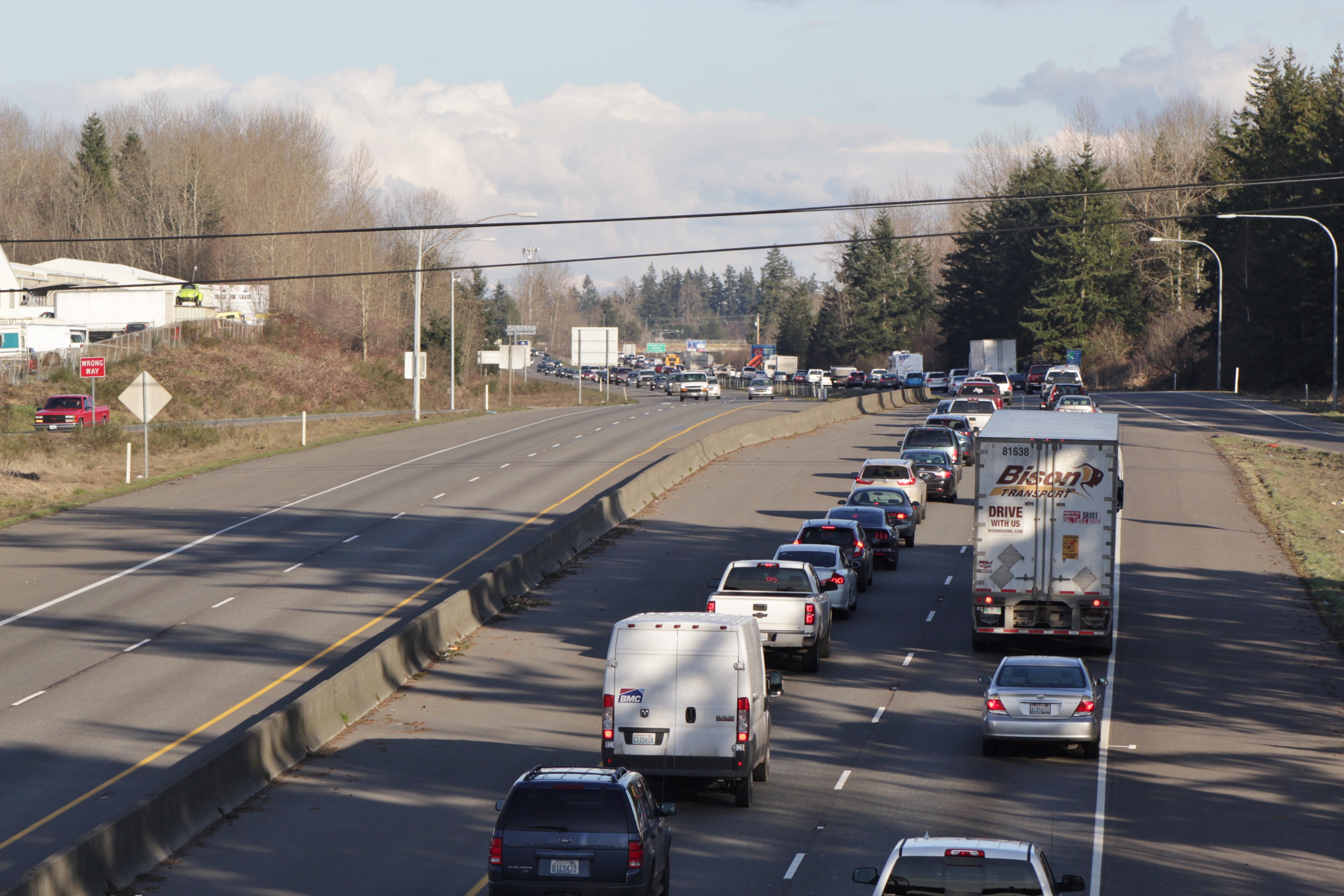
Traffic congestion on eastbound SR 512 in Parkland

SR 512 begins at a partial cloverleaf interchange with I-5 in Lakewood, a suburb of Tacoma in the Seattle metropolitan area. The interchange only uses three cloverleaf ramps, with turns from southbound I-5 to eastbound SR 512 allowed via a traffic signal; beyond the interchange, the highway continues west to an intersection with South Tacoma Way. The six-lane freeway travels southeast along the north side of Joint Base Lewis–McChord and intersects Steele Street before it enters the suburban Parkland area. SR 512 then intersects Pacific Avenue (part of SR 7) at an interchange near the Pacific Lutheran University campus.

The freeway continues east with four lanes through Midland, where it passes under overpasses for school buses and the Tacoma Rail system, before an interchange with Portland Avenue near Franklin Pierce High School. SR 512 then crosses over Swan Creek and enters the exurban area of Summit, where it passes residential subdivisions and farms that surround a junction with Canyon Road, the main route to the Frederickson industrial area. The freeway travels into Puyallup and intersects 94th Avenue East on the west side of the South Hill Mall. It then turns north and reaches an interchange with SR 161 at 31st Avenue Southwest, marking the beginning of a concurrency between the two state routes.

SR 512 and SR 161 continues north through the residential neighborhoods of Puyallup towards the Washington State Fairgrounds and turns east to intersect Meridian Street. The freeway then travels around downtown Puyallup to the east and intersects Pioneer Avenue before it crosses over the BNSF Railway's Seattle Subdivision tracks and the Puyallup River. SR 512 terminates shortly after crossing the river at a trumpet interchange with SR 167. SR 161 travels west with SR 167 to an intersection with Meridian Avenue, which it follows to Federal Way; SR 167 continues east to Sumner and turns north onto the Valley Freeway.

SR 512 is maintained by the Washington State Department of Transportation (WSDOT), which conducts an annual survey on state highways to measure traffic volume in terms of annual average daily traffic. Average traffic volumes on the highway in 2016 ranged from a minimum of 44,000 vehicles at its eastern terminus with SR 167 to a maximum of 110,000 near its western terminus at I-5. The entire route of SR 512 is designated as part of the National Highway System, a national network of roads identified as important to the national economy, defense, and mobility, and is listed as a Highway of Statewide Significance by the state legislature.

== History ==
=== Early roads ===
Prior to 1964, SR 512 was signed as SSH 5G.

The first road to connect Fort Steilacoom and areas of modern-day Lakewood to the Puyallup Valley was Byrd's Mill Road, established in 1852 and designated by the Oregon territorial government as an official government road. It was later upgraded into a military road and saw use during the 1855 Puget Sound War to carry soldiers and evacuated settlers from the Puyallup Valley. Byrd's Mill Road was designated as a state historical road in 1941 by the Washington state government, which funded the erection of historic markers at two sites.

By the turn of the 20th century, Lakeview (now Lakewood) was connected to Parkland and Puyallup by a series of country roads that were straightened in the early 1910s to form Lakeview–Puyallup Road (now 112th Street South). The road remained graveled until a series of paving projects were completed by the county government in the 1920s and 1930s with funding from the state government. It was then incorporated into the state highway system in 1937 as Secondary State Highway 5G (SSH 5G), which connected Primary State Highway 5 (PSH 5) in Puyallup to PSH 1 in Lakeview. The highway used a section of Meridian Avenue that was later co-signed with SSH 5N, which was created in 1955.

=== Freeway planning and construction ===
The state government approved plans for a network of limited-access freeways in July 1953, including SSH 5G as part of a system to serve Puyallup. The freeway would connect PSH 1 (replaced by I-5) to the future Valley Freeway (PSH 5, now SR 167) in Puyallup. The first section opened on October 1, 1959, as part of the project to build I-5 through South Tacoma and connected the Lakewood interchange to Steele Street north of 112th Street (also known as Airport Road). Land along the next section of the freeway to Pacific Avenue (SR 7) was cleared of homes and other buildings by early 1959 and $859,000 in construction funds were approved by the state legislature that year. Construction on the 1.5-mile (2.4 km) extension to Pacific Avenue began in August 1962 and was completed in December 1963 after delays due to wet weather.

SSH 5G was replaced by SR 512 as part of a statewide renumbering of highways that took effect in January 1964; SR 512 signage on the new freeway had already been installed with to reflect the change, despite the potential for public confusion. The 1.6-mile (2.6 km) section from the partially completed Pacific Avenue overpass to Portland Avenue began construction in June 1965 and was opened to traffic on February 28, 1967. The project, part of a $1.13 million contract, included the construction of a new railroad overpass and a pedestrian–school bus overpass at Franklin Pierce High School. The high school's original American football and track and field stadium was demolished to make way for the freeway, which bisected the campus; a new stadium was opened in 1963 using funds from the state government that were awarded as compensation.

=== Puyallup freeway construction ===
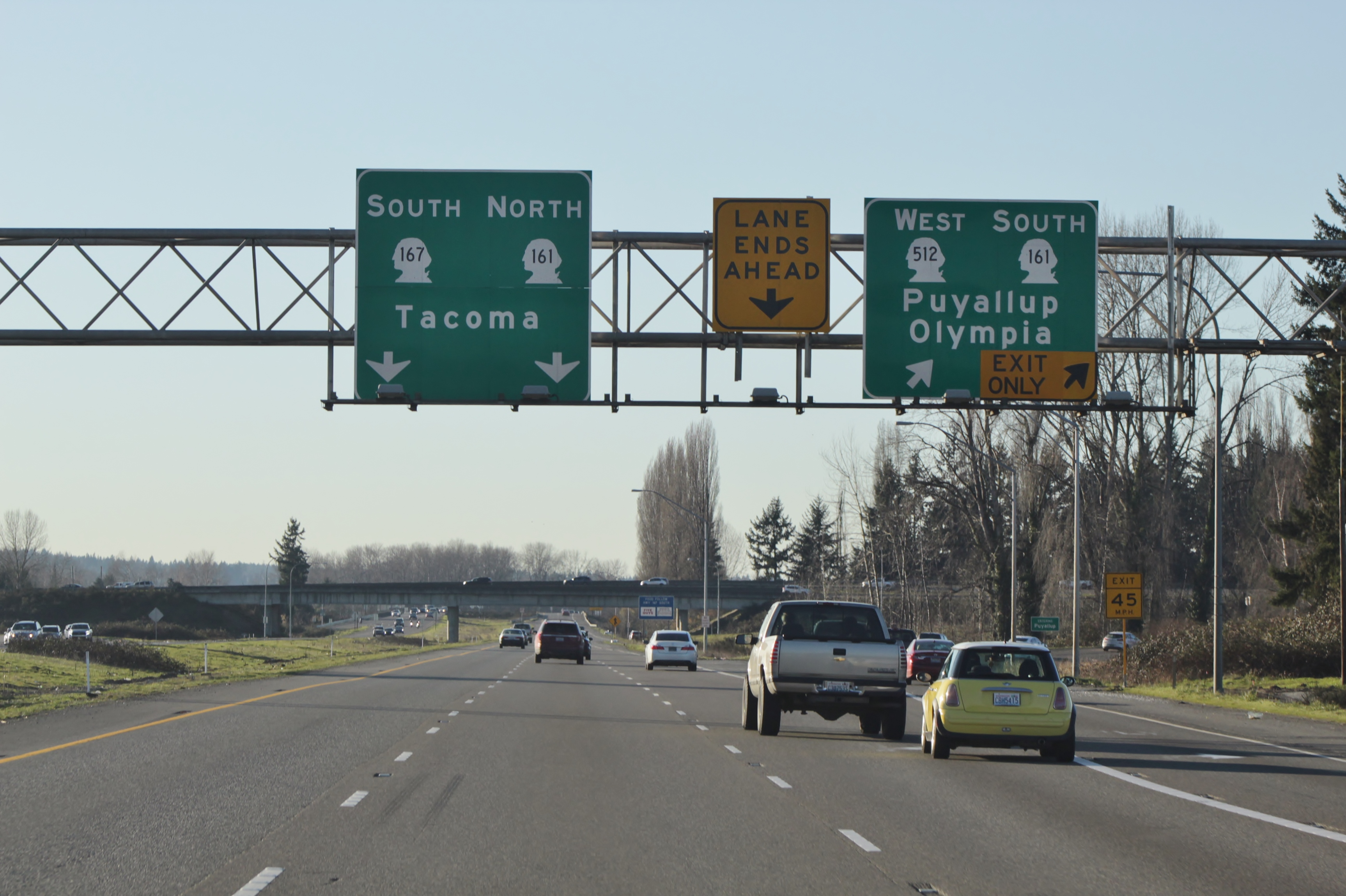
SR 167 at its interchange with SR 512 and SR 161 in Puyallup

Plans for the Puyallup section of SR 512, including an elevated viaduct near downtown and four interchanges, were endorsed by the city council in 1966. A cut in funds from the Highway Trust Fund announced by the federal government in January 1967 led to delays in construction, design work, and land acquisition for the remainder of the freeway from Parkland to Puyallup. The 3.5-mile (5.6 km) section from Portland Avenue to Canyon Road began construction in 1968 and was opened in August 1970. The state government revised its plans for the Puyallup section ahead of construction bidding in 1969. Parts of the freeway were reduced to a divided two-lane expressway in the interim to save costs on the $11 million elevated viaduct.

Construction of the freeway extension from Canyon Road to 94th Avenue in southern Puyallup began in August 1969 and was completed on April 25, 1972, following a nine-month delay due to poor weather conditions. It cost $2.2 million to construct the 3-mile (4.8 km) section, which included a temporary connection to Meridian Avenue (SR 161) to bypass a congested section of 112th Street. Preliminary work on the two-lane expressway through Puyallup began in early 1971 under a $3.72 million contract that covered 2.5 miles (4.0 km) between SR 161 and Pioneer Avenue. Over 1.25 million square yards (1,050,000 m^{2}) of earth was excavated to make way for the freeway through a cut in South Hill near the Washington State Fairgrounds. The Puyallup section—including one of two bridges over the Puyallup River—was dedicated and opened to traffic on December 13, 1973, completing the link to a partial interchange with SR 167.

The state government approved $3 million in funds to replace the two-lane expressway in Puyallup with a four-lane freeway in late 1973 through the construction of new bridges and overpasses. The northbound bridge over the Puyallup River opened on August 8, 1975, following additional work to repair a structural deficiency in a pier and weather delays. The final part of the widening project, a larger interchange to connect SR 512 with SR 167, was completed in July 1976 at a cost of $1.4 million. SR 161 was moved from Meridian Avenue onto SR 512 by 1975, creating a concurrency around downtown Puyallup.

=== Later projects ===
The freeway's interchange with Pacific Avenue was rebuilt in 1983 to add a loop ramp to replace a left turn onto westbound SR 512. An additional interchange was planned in the 1960s east of Pacific Avenue to serve the Mountain Freeway (to be part of SR 7), which was ultimately never built. The westernmost section of SR 512, between I-5 and SR 7, was widened to eight lanes in 1989 to address congestion between the two major highways.

Increased residential and commercial development in Puyallup's South Hill, including the opening of the South Hill Mall in 1989, brought more traffic and congestion to the SR 512 corridor. Several ideas to mitigate the increased traffic were proposed and studied, including high-occupancy vehicle lanes (HOV lanes) on SR 512, improved bus service, and the construction of the Cross-Base Highway to provide a southern bypass of McChord Air Force Base. Pierce Transit opened a park and ride at the freeway's western terminus in 1988, which was followed by a transit center at the South Hill Mall in 1999 alongside increased bus service.

The mall's first major expansion was planned in the early 1990s and was to include an infill interchange and additional park and ride lot as part of traffic mitigation. A half-diamond interchange was built at 94th Avenue East in 1997 at a cost of $4.6 million; a park and ride at its northwest corner was opened two years later in response to the use of mall parking lots by commuters. WSDOT also completed construction of a westbound truck lane between downtown Puyallup and South Hill in 1994.

The cloverleaf interchange with I-5 in Lakewood was modified in the late 1990s to remove the southbound onramp to SR 512 after it had become too congested; by 1994, approximately 20,000 vehicles used the interchange on a daily basis. To eliminate the weaving between traffic entering and exiting via the southbound ramps, the southbound loop to eastbound SR 512 was replaced by a traffic signal on the existing outer ramp to South Tacoma Way. A ramp meter—the first in Pierce County—was installed in 1994 for traffic entering southbound I-5 from SR 512. The traffic signal was intended to be an interim solution until a flyover ramp connecting to eastbound SR 512 could be constructed with additional funding, which had not been granted.

WSDOT has studied additional projects to address congestion on sections of SR 512, particularly near I-5 and the South Hill Mall. Their long-term plans for HOV lanes on I-5 through Pierce County include an unfunded proposal to fully rebuild the SR 512 interchange and the Steele Street bridge. Ramp meters were added to the Steele Street and SR 7 interchanges on SR 512 in 2016 to control westbound traffic during peak periods; WSDOT plans to add ramp meters to all interchanges on SR 512 in both directions when funding is available. The SR 161/31st Avenue Southwest interchange near South Hill gained an additional traffic signal and turn lane in 2021 as part of improvements to roads around the mall.

== Exit list ==
The entire route is in Pierce County. All exits are unnumbered.

Location	mi	km	Destinations	Notes
Lakewood	0.00	0.00	South Tacoma Way; I-5 – Tacoma, Seattle, Portland	
Lakewood	0.63	1.01	Steele Street	
Parkland	2.22	3.57	SR 7 (Pacific Avenue) – Parkland, Spanaway	
Midland	3.71	5.97	Portland Avenue – Midland	
Summit	5.86	9.43	Canyon Road – Summit	
Puyallup	8.37	13.47	9th Street Southwest, 94th Avenue East	Eastbound exit and westbound entrance
Puyallup	8.74	14.07	SR 161 – South Hill, Eatonville	West end of SR 161 overlap
Puyallup	10.06	16.19	Meridian Avenue South – Puyallup	
Puyallup	11.12	17.90	Pioneer Avenue East – Orting, Puyallup	Former SR 162
Puyallup	12.06	19.41	SR 161 north / SR 167 to SR 410 east – Milton, Tacoma, Seattle, Yakima	East end of SR 161 overlap
1.000 mi = 1.609 km; 1.000 km = 0.621 mi: Concurrency terminus; Incomplete access
