= Death of Susan Rainwater =

2018 crime in Washington, United States

- Location: Pierce County, Washington, U.S.
- Date: August 9, 2018
- Attack type: Vehicular homicide
- Deaths: 1
- Charges: Vehicular homicide; Hit-and-run; Drug possession
- Convicted: 1

On the morning of August 9, 2018, Jeremy Simon struck and killed 66-year-old bicyclist Susan Rainwater while driving on State Route 7 near 320th Street East in the Eatonville, Washington area. Simon then fled the scene. The case gained notable attention for being partially solved through crowdsourced online investigation before Simon's eventual arrest and conviction.

== Background ==
Susan Rainwater was a married mother and grandmother from the Eatonville area. She was an accomplished breeder and national champion show horse rider in both the United States and Canada. On the morning of August 9, 2018, she left her home for a bicycle ride and did not return.

== Collision and investigation ==
Rainwater was struck from behind by a vehicle that left the northbound lanes of State Route 7 sometime between 9:21 a.m. and 9:24 a.m. Her body was found in a ditch some distance from the road, and her bicycle was discovered mangled. There were no witnesses to the collision.

The primary physical evidence left at the scene was a small piece of black plastic from the vehicle's front-end assembly. With few leads, a Washington State Patrol trooper posted a photograph of the fragment on Twitter and later on Reddit in the subreddit r/WhatIsThisThing, appealing for public assistance in identifying the vehicle.

== Online identification and arrest ==
On August 10, 2018, a Reddit user and former Maryland vehicle inspector identified the fragment as a headlight bezel from a late-1980s Chevrolet C/K-series pickup truck, noting a distinctive notch used for headlight adjustment. This identification was widely circulated and provided a critical break in the case.

Simultaneously, an anonymous tip was provided to the Pierce County Sheriff's Office on August 10, which included a license plate and a description of a pickup truck with damage to its right-front headlight area. This tip led detectives to Jeremy Thomas Simon, a 37-year-old resident of Roy, Washington. Simon was arrested on the morning of August 14, 2018, while driving his lifted 1986 Chevrolet K-10 pickup, which had corresponding front-end damage. He admitted to detectives that he had fled the scene after the collision.

== Legal proceedings ==
Jeremy Thomas Simon was initially charged with vehicular homicide, hit-and-run resulting in death, and possession of a controlled substance (heroin, which was found on him at the time of arrest).

On January 30, 2019, Simon pleaded guilty in Pierce County Superior Court to vehicular homicide, hit-and-run, and drug possession. As part of a plea agreement, he was sentenced under the Drug Offender Sentencing Alternative (DOSA) to 53.5 months (approximately four and a half years). The sentence mandated that he serve half the time in prison and half on probation, contingent upon his compliance with substance abuse treatment and other court-ordered conditions.

At the sentencing hearing, Simon stated he had fallen asleep at the wheel, initially thought he hit a mailbox, and panicked upon seeing a bicycle. He expressed remorse to the court and Rainwater's family. Members of Rainwater's family addressed the court, with her daughter stating the sentence seemed insufficient but urging Simon to live a better life. The judge noted Simon had sought substance abuse treatment prior to the incident.
