= La Grande, Washington =

Unincorporated community & CDP in Washington, United States

- Unincorporated community and CDP
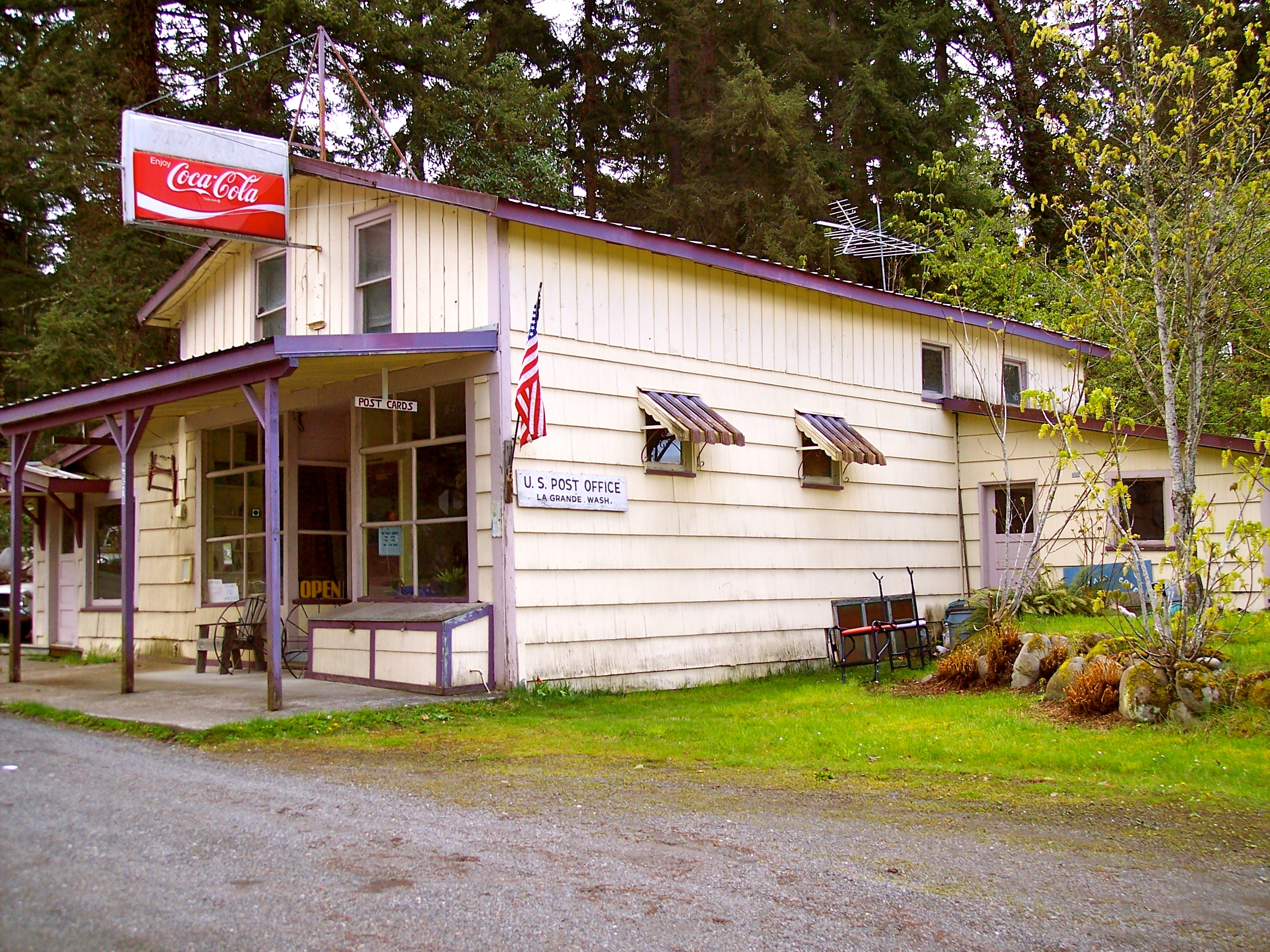
- US Post Office in La Grande, WA

- Location within Washington (state)
- Coordinates: 46°49′11″N 122°17′46″W
- Country: United States
- State: Washington
- County: Pierce
- Elevation: 1,660 ft (510 m)
- Time zone: UTC-8 (PST)
  - Summer (DST): UTC-7 (PDT)
- ZIP Code: 98348
- Area code(s): 360, 564
- GNIS feature ID: 2584992

La Grande is an unincorporated community and census-designated place in Pierce County, Washington, United States. As of the 2020 census, La Grande had a population of 121. La Grande is located along Washington State Route 7 3.5 miles (5.6 km) southwest of Eatonville. La Grande has a post office with ZIP code 98348.

== Climate ==
This region experiences warm (but not hot) and dry summers, with no average monthly temperatures above 71.6 °F (22 °C). According to the Köppen Climate Classification system, La Grande has a warm-summer Mediterranean climate, abbreviated "Csb" on climate maps.

Climate data for La Grande
Month	Jan	Feb	Mar	Apr	May	Jun	Jul	Aug	Sep	Oct	Nov	Dec	Year
Record high °F (°C)	65 (18)	70 (21)	74 (23)	83 (28)	92 (33)	96 (36)	98 (37)	102 (39)	94 (34)	85 (29)	75 (24)	66 (19)	102 (39)
Mean daily maximum °F (°C)	45 (7)	49.1 (9.5)	51.9 (11.1)	57.7 (14.3)	65.8 (18.8)	71 (22)	77.6 (25.3)	77 (25)	71 (22)	60.6 (15.9)	50.6 (10.3)	46.3 (7.9)	60.3 (15.7)
Mean daily minimum °F (°C)	33.1 (0.6)	35.4 (1.9)	35.9 (2.2)	38.7 (3.7)	44 (7)	48.9 (9.4)	52.2 (11.2)	52.8 (11.6)	49.6 (9.8)	43.7 (6.5)	37.6 (3.1)	34.9 (1.6)	42.2 (5.7)
Record low °F (°C)	6 (−14)	10 (−12)	14 (−10)	28 (−2)	32 (0)	33 (1)	35 (2)	40 (4)	31 (−1)	28 (−2)	7 (−14)	4 (−16)	4 (−16)
Average precipitation inches (mm)	5.06 (129)	3.67 (93)	3.88 (99)	3.21 (82)	2.4 (61)	2.12 (54)	0.9 (23)	1.57 (40)	2.09 (53)	3.3 (84)	4.73 (120)	5.59 (142)	38.52 (978)
Average snowfall inches (cm)	1.8 (4.6)	0.7 (1.8)	0.1 (0.25)	0.1 (0.25)	0 (0)	0 (0)	0 (0)	0 (0)	0 (0)	0 (0)	0.4 (1.0)	1.1 (2.8)	4.2 (11)
Average precipitation days	20	18	19	17	14	12	7	9	11	15	19	22	183

== Demographics ==
Historical population
Census	Pop.	Note	%±
2010	109		—
2020	121		11.0%
U.S. Decennial Census; 2000 2010

La Grande first appeared as a census designated place in the 2010 U.S. census.

=== Racial and ethnic composition ===
La Grande CDP, Washington – Racial and ethnic composition Note: the US Census treats Hispanic/Latino as an ethnic category. This table excludes Latinos from the racial categories and assigns them to a separate category. Hispanics/Latinos may be of any race.
Race / Ethnicity (NH = Non-Hispanic)	Pop 2010	Pop 2020	% 2010	% 2020
White alone (NH)	94	99	86.24%	81.82%
Black or African American alone (NH)	1	1	0.92%	0.83%
Native American or Alaska Native alone (NH)	0	0	0.00%	0.00%
Asian alone (NH)	3	2	2.75%	1.65%
Native Hawaiian or Pacific Islander alone (NH)	0	0	0.00%	0.00%
Other race alone (NH)	0	1	0.00%	0.83%
Mixed race or Multiracial (NH)	6	11	5.50%	9.09%
Hispanic or Latino (any race)	5	7	4.59%	5.79%
Total	109	121	100.00%	100.00%
