= Secondary State Highway 1N =

There were two secondary state highways in Washington numbered 1N:

- Secondary State Highway 1N (Washington 1937-1943), a loop west of Centralia
- Secondary State Highway 1N (Washington 1943-1970), now SR 507 from Centralia to Tenino
