= Washington State Route 507 =

State highway in Washington, United States

State Route 507

- SR 507 highlighted in red

Route information
- Auxiliary route of I-5
- Maintained by WSDOT
- Length: 43.52 mi (70.04 km)
- Existed: 1964–present

Major junctions
- South end: I-5 / US 12 in Centralia
- SR 510 in Yelm; SR 702 in McKenna
- North end: SR 7 in Spanaway

Location
- Country: United States
- State: Washington
- Counties: Lewis, Thurston, Pierce

Highway system
- State highways in Washington; Interstate; US; State; Scenic; Pre-1964; 1964 renumbering; Former
← SR 506	→ SR 508

State Route 507 (SR 507) is a Washington state highway in Lewis, Thurston and Pierce counties that extends 43.52 miles (70.04 km) from Interstate 5 (I-5) and U.S. Route 12 (US 12) in Centralia to SR 7 in Spanaway. The highway also intersects SR 510 in Yelm and SR 702 in McKenna. The first appearance of the roadway on a map was in 1916 and since, two highways, Secondary State Highway 5H (SSH 5H) and SSH 1N, were established on the current route of SR 507 in 1937 and 1943. They both became SR 507 during the 1964 highway renumbering.

== Route description ==
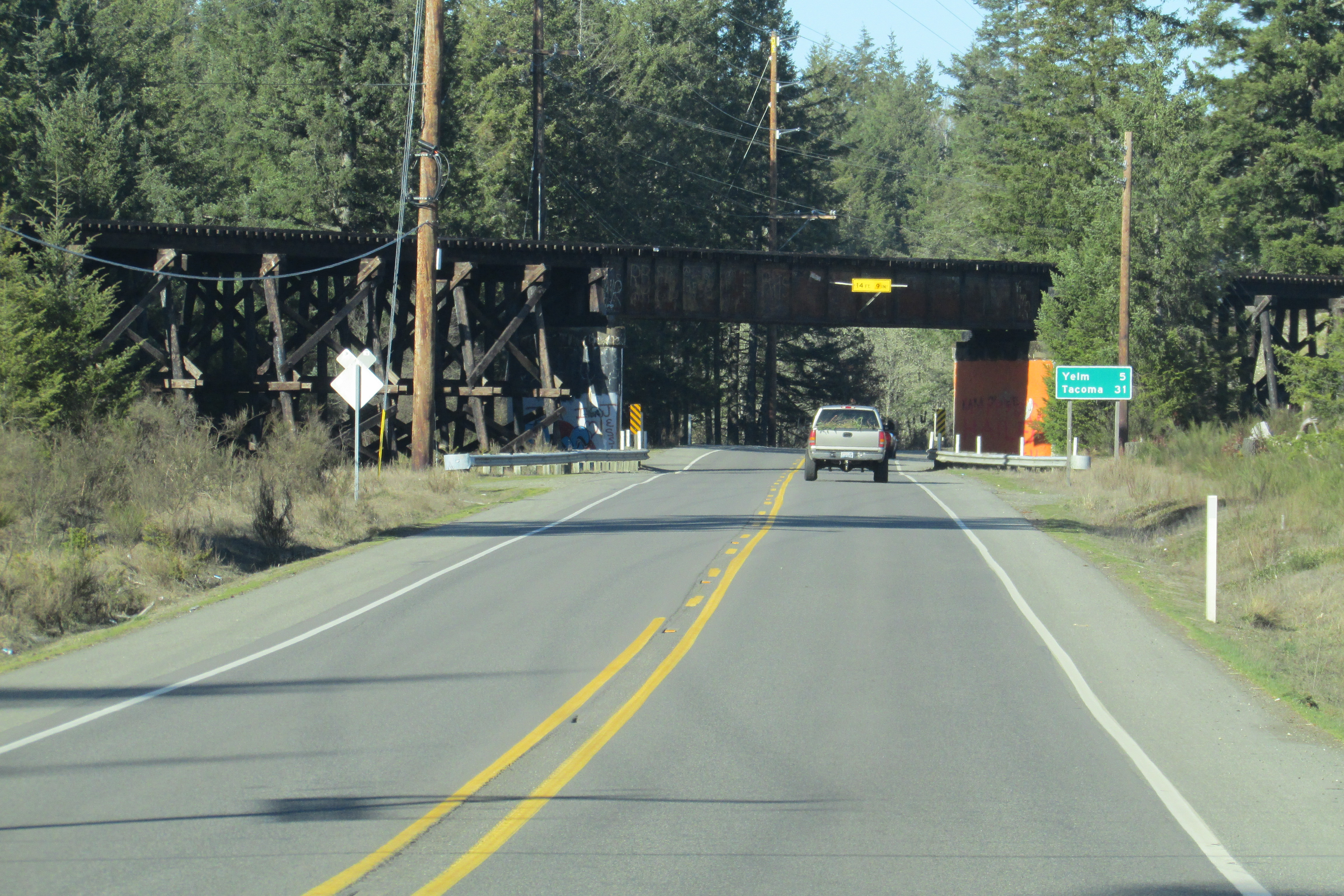
SR 507 in Rainier

State Route 507 (SR 507) begins at a diamond interchange with Interstate 5 (I-5), co-signed as U.S. Route 12 (US 12) in Centralia. Traveling east as Mellen, Alder and West Cherry Streets, the highway crosses railroad tracks owned by BNSF Railway and used by Amtrak's Cascades and Coast Starlight routes, both of which serve the Centralia Amtrak station. The roadway later intersects Pearl Street, the only couplet on SR 507, which parallels Tower Avenue through Downtown Centralia. The street then becomes Tower Avenue and turns north to pass the Centralia Amtrak station. SR 507 realigns west as Sixth Street to intersect and become Pearl Street, once again traveling northeast as Downing Road to leave Centralia. Still parallel to BNSF Railway tracks, the road leaves Lewis County, enters Thurston County, passes Bucoda and turns north to intersect an old segment of US 99 in Tenino. Within Tenino, the highway stops paralleling the BNSF tracks and goes east through the city as Sussex Avenue and starts to parallel a route of the Tacoma Rail eastward out of the city. Passing through Rainier as Binghampton Street, the roadway intersects the eastern terminus of SR 510 in Yelm and then turns southeast as Yelm Avenue, before leaving both Yelm and Thurston County to enter Pierce County on a bridge over the Nisqually River. Once in Pierce County, SR 507 intersects SR 702 in McKenna and continues north as the Spanaway McKenna Highway to Roy, where the highway turns east and then northeast into Fort Lewis. Immediately after leaving Fort Lewis, the roadway ends at an intersection with SR 7 in Spanaway. Between SR 510 in Yelm and SR 702 in McKenna, the roadway had an estimated daily average of 19,000 motorists in 2007, causing the segment to be the busiest on SR 507. The busiest segment in 1970 was the Maple Street junction in Downtown Centralia, with an estimated daily average of 14,000 motorists. SR 507 is also the southern segment of the East Pacific Highway, which runs from Centralia to Sumas.

== History ==
Sections of modern-day SR 507 were established as wagon roads as early as 1856, with the general corridor first appearing on maps in 1897. In 1937, during the creation of the Primary and secondary highways, Secondary State Highway 5H (SSH 5H) was established, running from Tenino to Spanaway. A section of 507 houses the Tenino Downtown Historic District. In 1943, SSH 1N, running from Centralia to Tenino, was created. In 1964, a highway renumbering replaced both SSH 5H and SSH 1N with SR 507.

WSDOT began construction of safety improvements to a section of SR 507 between Roy and Yelm in 1985 following a higher-than-average rate of collisions, especially those involving trees. Approximately 50 to 70 fir trees were removed to improve visibility despite opposition from local residents seeking to keep the highway's scenic qualities. The highway's bridge over the Nisqually River in McKenna was replaced by a new span in 1987. A left turn lane was installed at the Yew Street intersection east of the Interstate 5 (I-5) and U.S. Route 12 (US 12) interchange in Centralia on May 24, 2007. SR 704, when completed, is predicted to reduce congestion on SR 507. A section of the highway near Rainier was renamed the Sgt. Justin. D. Norton Memorial Highway in 2017 to honor a local soldier.

== Major intersections ==
County	Location	mi	km	Destinations	Notes
Lewis	Centralia	0.00	0.00	I-5 / US 12 – Vancouver, Tacoma, Seattle	Southern terminus
Thurston	Tenino	13.64	21.95	Old Hwy 99 west – Grand Mound	
Thurston	Tenino	14.69	23.64	Old Hwy 99 north – Olympia	
Thurston	Yelm	28.20	45.38	SR 510 west to I-5 – Lacey, Tacoma, Seattle	
Pierce	McKenna	31.06	49.99	SR 702 east (352nd Street East) to SR 7 – Tacoma, Morton	
Pierce	Spanaway	43.52	70.04	SR 7 (Pacific Avenue South) – Tacoma, Elbe, Morton	Eastern terminus
1.000 mi = 1.609 km; 1.000 km = 0.621 mi
