= Little Mashel River Waterfalls =

Waterfalls in Washington (state), United States

The Little Mashel River Waterfalls are the three waterfalls contained within the gorge of the Little Mashel River, not far above its confluence with the Mashel River.

== Tom Tom Falls ==
Tom Tom Falls
- Location: Near Eatonville, Washington
- Type: Plunge
- Total height: 25 feet (7.6 m)
- Number of drops: 1
- Longest drop: 25 feet (7.6 m)
- Total width: 5 feet (1.5 m)
- Watercourse: Little Mashel River

Tom Tom Falls, at 46°50′50″N 122°16′19″W, also known as Upper Little Mashel Falls, is the first major waterfall in the main gorge of the Little Mashel River. The river flows over an old dam, an artifact of an old millpond, before narrowing and plunging about 25 feet over a cliff into a pool below. The falls are only 5 feet wide, so they are quite powerful. In high water, a small portion of the river completely bypasses the falls and its cliff, forming a series of cascades and ending at the river roughly 50 feet (15 m) downstream.

== Little Mashel Falls ==
Little Mashel Falls
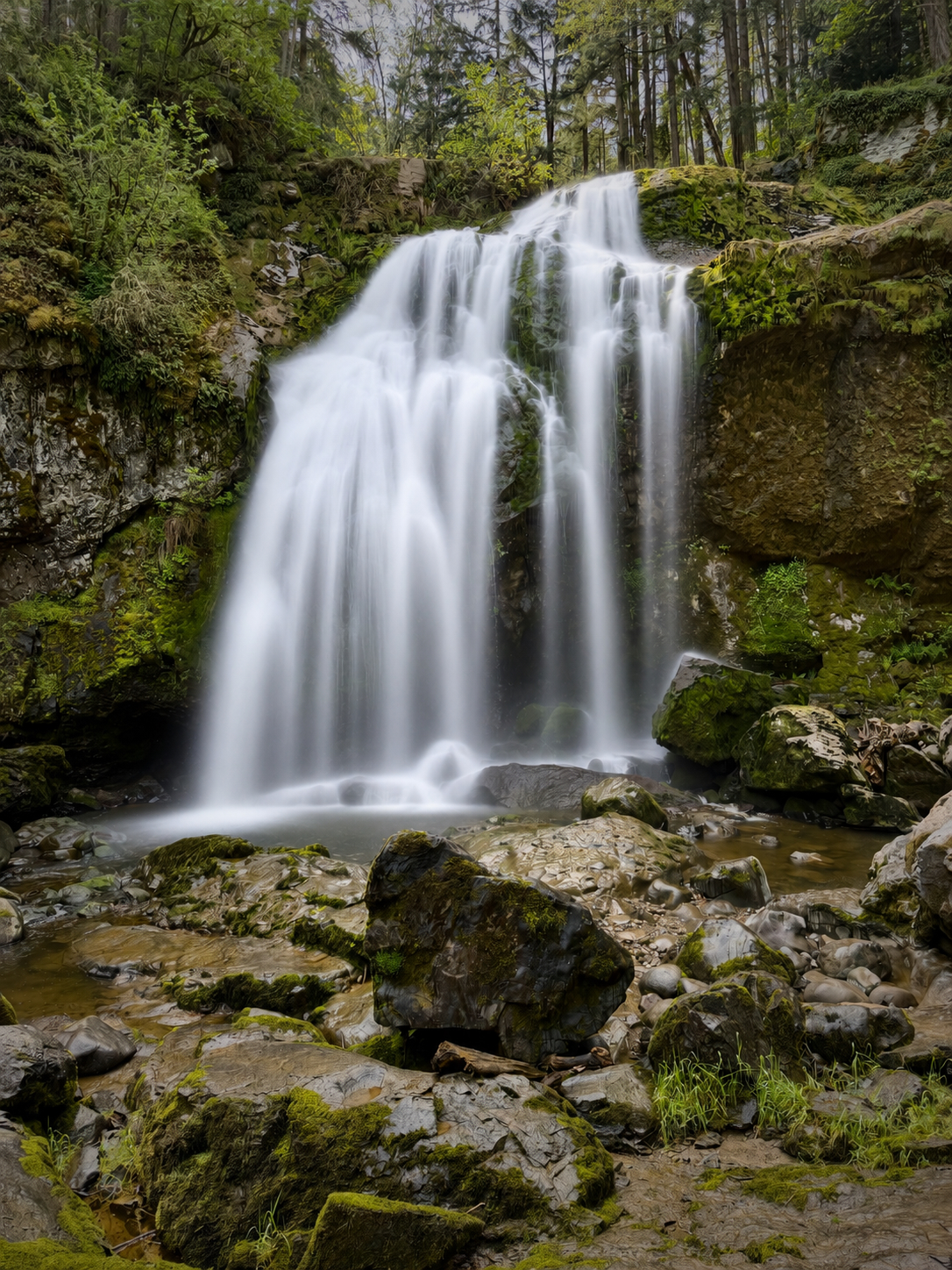
- Location: Near Eatonville, Washington
- Type: Fan
- Total height: 120 feet (37 m)
- Number of drops: 1
- Longest drop: 120 feet (37 m)
- Total width: 20 feet (6.1 m)
- Watercourse: Little Mashel River

Little Mashel Falls, at 46°50′57″N 122°16′21″W, is the largest of the 3 falls along the Little Mashel and is located between Tom Tom Falls and Lower Little Mashel Falls. Little Mashel Falls occurs where the river slides down roughly 125 feet (38 m) into a congregation of boulders. In spring when the river is high, the falls are thunderous and generate a lot of spray. In the summer, one can actually walk behind the falls as the river and falls have less flow. Getting down to the base of the falls as well as the brink is easily possible, but extreme caution should be used since the rocks are very slippery, especially in high water, and many people have died in falls from the lip of the falls.

== Lower Little Mashel Falls ==
Lower Little Mashel Falls
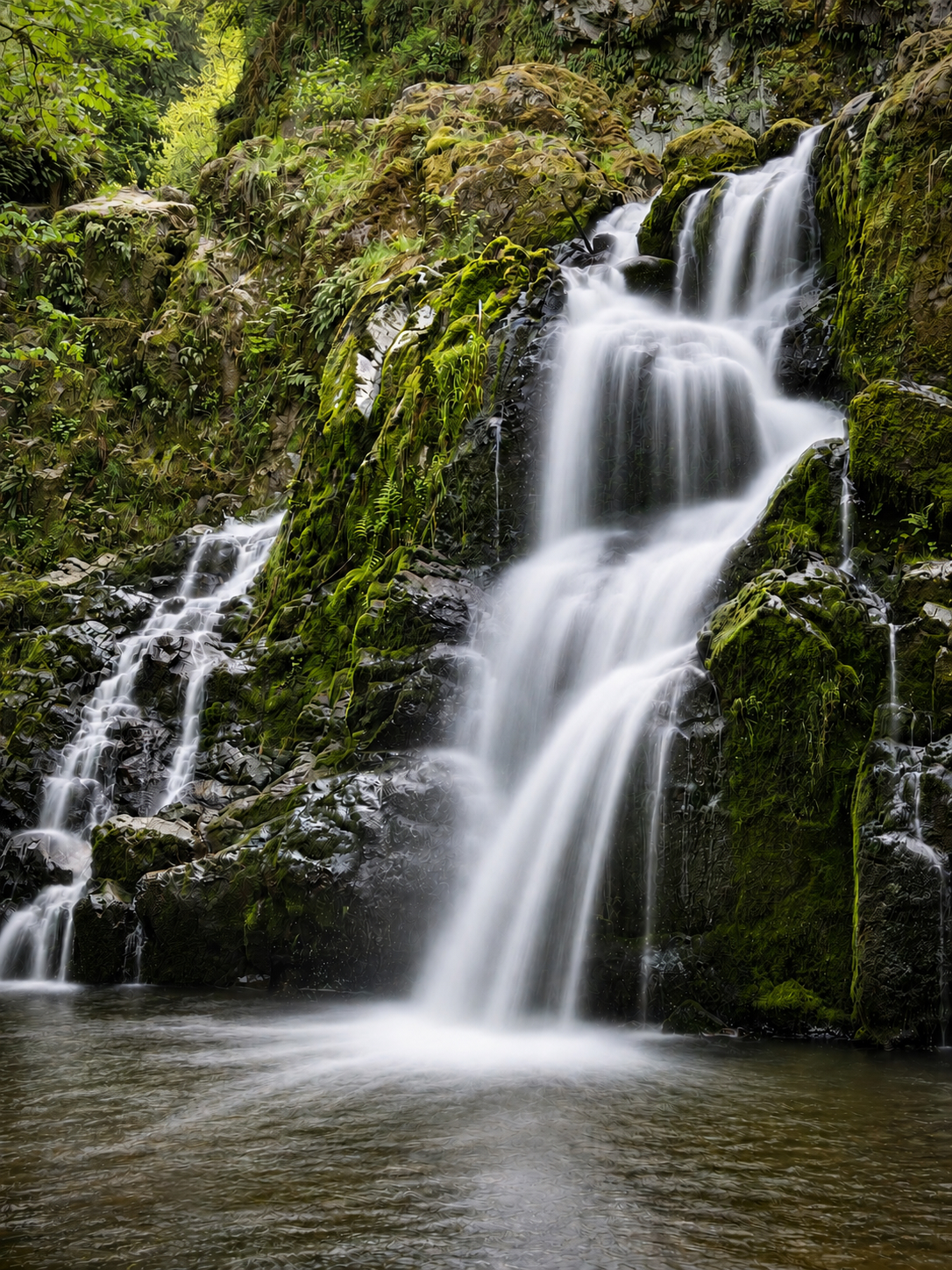
- Location: Near Eatonville, Washington
- Type: Segmented
- Total height: 40 feet (12 m)
- Number of drops: 1
- Longest drop: 40 feet (12 m)
- Total width: 55 feet (17 m)
- Watercourse: Little Mashel River

Lower Little Mashel Falls, at 46°51′00″N 122°16′24″W, is the final waterfall within the gorge along the Little Mashel River, splitting into 3 segments and winding 40 feet over a cliff into a murky pool, presumably colored that way by tannic acid. It is the only waterfall in the Little Mashel gorge with no official name. Caution should be used when using the trail to the falls’ base since it is overgrown, steep, and muddy.
