= Washington State Route 7 =

State highway in Lewis and Pierce counties

State Route 7
- SR 7 highlighted in red

Route information
- Maintained by WSDOT
- Length: 58.26 mi (93.76 km)
- Existed: 1964–present

Major junctions
- South end: US 12 in Morton
- SR 706 in Elbe; SR 161 near Eatonville; SR 507 in Spanaway; SR 512 in Parkland
- North end: I-5 / I-705 in Tacoma

Location
- Country: United States
- State: Washington
- Counties: Lewis, Pierce

Highway system
- State highways in Washington; Interstate; US; State; Scenic; Pre-1964; 1964 renumbering; Former
← SR 6	→ SR 8

State Route 7 (SR 7) is a state highway in Lewis and Pierce counties, located in the U.S. state of Washington. The 58.60-mile (94.31 km) long roadway begins at U.S. Route 12 (US 12) in Morton and continues north to intersect several other state highways to Tacoma, where it ends at an interchange with Interstate 5 (I-5) and I-705. The road has several names, such as Second Street in Morton, the Mountain Highway in rural areas, Pacific Avenue in Spanaway, Parkland and Tacoma and 38th Street in Tacoma. Near the end of the highway there is a short freeway that has been proposed to be extended south parallel to an already existing railroad, owned by Tacoma Rail, which serves as the median of the short freeway.

The earliest road to use the current route of SR 7 first appeared in a 1900 map of the Tacoma area and has been part of the state highway system since 1909, when the Alder-Kosmos Road was added to the system as State Road 18. State Road 18 became part of two branches of State Road 5 in 1923 and later branches of Primary State Highway 5. During the 1964 highway renumbering, the branches became SR 7.

== Route description ==
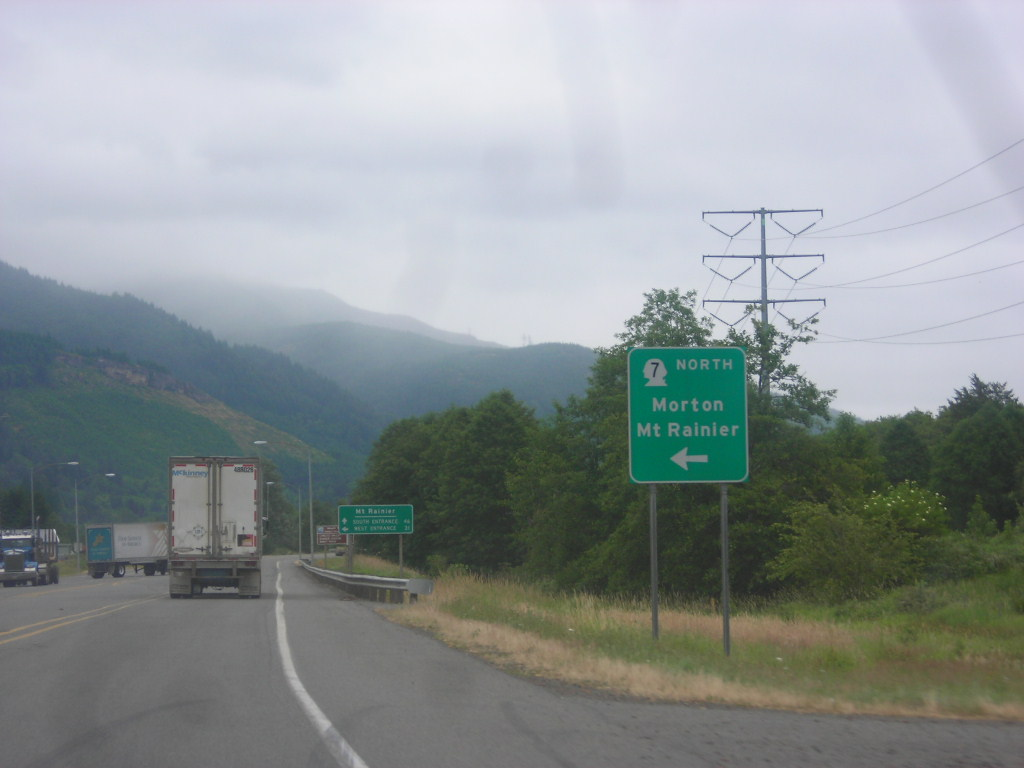
U.S. Route 12 eastbound approaching the southern terminus of SR 7 in Morton.

SR 7 begins at an intersection with U.S. Route 12 (US 12), a major east–west highway, in Morton. Traveling north as Second Street and paralleling the Morton–Tacoma (Mountain Division) route of Tacoma Rail, the street intersects Main Avenue, which continues west out of the city as SR 508. After leaving Morton, the highway becomes the Mountain Highway and passes through a heavily forested canyon near Mount Rainier and parallel to the Tilton River and Roundrop Creek. Bridging the Nisqually River, the highway leaves Lewis County and enters Pierce County. In Elbe, the roadway intersects SR 706, which goes east to Mount Rainier National Park. Following the Nisqually River, which has become *Alder Lake, and Tacoma Rail line, SR 161 branches off towards Eatonville and SR 702 travels west from the plains to McKenna.

Passing Elk Plain and suburban areas, the highway enters Spanaway near the Fort Lewis boundary where SR 7 intersects SR 507, which continues southwest to Chehalis. The Mountain Highway becomes Pacific Avenue and enters Parkland. Shortly after 112th Street, the roadway has a partial cloverleaf interchange with SR 512, which uses 108th Street South as two ramps. Leaving Parkland and entering Tacoma, Pacific Avenue turns east as 38th Street and then has another partial cloverleaf interchange with a short freeway and the proposed route of SR 7, which is used by the roadway. The freeway was the busiest segment of the highway in 2007, with an estimated daily average of 27,000 motorists. The median of the freeway is the Tacoma Rail route and at the northern terminus is an interchange with Interstate 5 (I-5). SR 7 ends at the interchange, located near the Tacoma Dome, but the roadway continues north into Downtown Tacoma as I-705.

== History ==
A map of PSH 5 and its branches, two of which, Tacoma–Mount Rainier (TR) and Elbe–Kosmos (EK) became parts of SR 7 after the 1964 highway renumbering.

A 1900 map of the Tacoma area showed a roadway extending north from Spanaway to Tacoma that would later become SR 7. In 1909, the Alder-Kosmos Road, numbered State Road 18, was added to the state highway system and ran from Kosmos north through Morton and Elbe to Alder. The National Park Highway was created in 1913 and extended from the Pacific Ocean to Tacoma and south to Elbe, where it turned east into Mount Rainier National Park. Both highways were replaced by two branches of State Road 5 in 1923, which traveled from Tacoma to Mount Rainier and Elbe to Chehalis. State Road 5 became Primary State Highway 5 (PSH 5) during the creation of the Primary state highways in 1937 and the Tacoma–Mount Rainier branch remained the same, but the Elbe–Chehalis branch was shortened to Kosmos.

During the 1964 highway renumbering the two branches of PSH 5 became SR 7. The southernmost section of the highway between Kosmos and Morton was replaced in November 1967 with the relocation of US 12 as part of preparations for the Mossyrock Dam, which would create the Riffe Lake reservoir and inundate the area. The urban sections of SR 7 were planned to be moved to the new Mountain Freeway, which would follow the Tacoma Rail corridor between Roy and Tacoma. The northernmost section, between North 38th Street and I-5, opened on February 14, 1968. The remainder of the freeway was never built.

In 2002, a new auxiliary route of SR 7, SR 704 was established to provide a bypass of Tacoma to provide direct connections between I-5 and Spanaway. On July 30, 2008, the Washington State Department of Transportation (WSDOT) had a groundbreaking ceremony to start construction of SR 704, which was predicted to be finished after 2017. However, due to a lack of money, finishing the project is on indefinite hiatus as of 2022. The segment of the highway between SR 507 in Spanaway to SR 512 in Parkland had a very high accident rate, prompting the addition of safety improvements to the roadway in 2007. Between Morton and Spanaway, WSDOT is currently (as of 2009) developing a route development plan to improve the roadway. The project is divided into three phases, the first phase was completed in 2006 and focused between Morton and Elbe and the second phase will be focused between Elbe and SR 702 while the third will focus between SR 702 to Spanaway.

A small plane made an emergency landing on a section of SR 7 in Parkland on August 1, 2019, following a fuel system malfunction. The incident was captured on the dashcam of a state trooper.

== Major intersections ==
County	Location	mi	km	Destinations	Notes
Lewis	Morton	0.00	0.00	US 12 – White Pass, Yakima, Mossyrock	Southern terminus
Lewis	Morton	0.45	0.72	SR 508 west (Main Avenue)	
Pierce	Elbe	16.82	27.07	SR 706 east – Mount Rainier National Park	
Pierce		26.98	43.42	SR 161 north – Eatonville, Puyallup	
Pierce		36.06	58.03	SR 702 west / Eatonville Cutoff Road – McKenna, Yelm	
Pierce	Spanaway	47.36	76.22	SR 507 south – Roy, Centralia	
Pierce	Spanaway	48.31	77.75	SR 704 west (Cross-Base Highway) / 176th Street East	
Pierce	Parkland	52.53	84.54	SR 512 to I-5 – Seattle, Portland, Puyallup	Interchange
Pierce	Tacoma	57.44	92.44	South 38th Street	Interchange
Pierce	Tacoma	South end of freeway			
Pierce	Tacoma	58.26	93.76	I-5 – Olympia, Portland, Seattle	
Pierce	Tacoma	58.26	93.76	I-705 north / East 26th Street – Tacoma Dome, City Center	Continuation beyond I-5
1.000 mi = 1.609 km; 1.000 km = 0.621 mi: Route transition
