= Little Mashel River =

- Location of the mouth of the Little Mashel River in Washington Little Mashel River (the United States)

Location
- Country: United States
- State: Washington
- County: Pierce County
- City: Eatonville, Washington

Physical characteristics
- Source: An unnamed lake
  - location: Cascade Range, Pierce County, Washington
  - coordinates: 46°47′34″N 122°8′52″W
  - elevation: 2,830 ft (860 m)
- Mouth: Mashel River
  - location: Near Eatonville, Washington, Pierce County
  - coordinates: 46°47′34″N 122°08′52″W
  - elevation: 710 ft (220 m)

The Little Mashel River is a river in Pierce County, Washington. It is a tributary of the Mashel River, and enters the Mashel just 380 feet (116 m) downstream from the Eatonville, Washington, city limits. It is noted for its canyon and the three waterfalls.

== Course ==
The Little Mashel begins in a small, unnamed lake located about 7.6 miles (12 km) southeast of Eatonville, Washington. Upon exiting the lake, the river, very small at this point, flows northeast for about .3 miles (483 m) before turning northwest for about 5.7 miles (9 km), merging with South Fork Little Mashel River about 4.9 miles (8 km) along the way. There, the river briefly turns southwest, picks up the waters of its only named tributary, Midway Creek, and then turns northwest again. It flows that way for another 1.2 miles (2 km) or so until its confluence with the Mashel. A short canyon that sees the river drop over three large, often visited waterfalls lies about .6 miles (966 m) above its mouth.

== South Fork ==
The South Fork Little Mashel River begins about 1 mile (1,609 m) west of the lake the main fork begins in and flows northwest for about 4.1 miles (7 km) until it merges with the main fork of the Little Mashel not far upstream from where Midway Creek meets the Little Mashel.

== See also ==
- Little Mashel River Waterfalls
- List of rivers in Washington
