= T. C. Van Eaton =

American politician

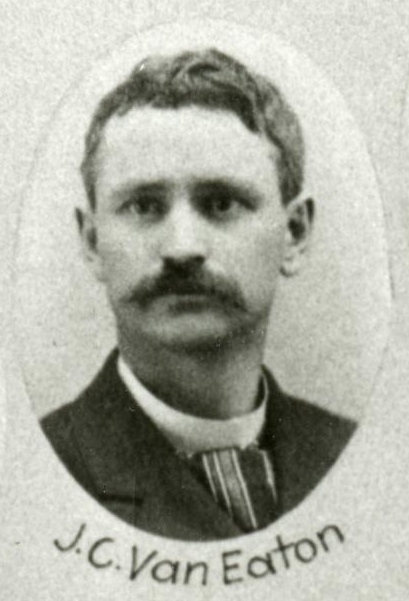
- Van Eaton in 1895

Member of the Washington House of Representatives for the 34th district
- In office 1895–1897

Personal details
- Born: July 27, 1862 Pope County, Minnesota, United States
- Died: October 31, 1951 (aged 89) Fort Steilacoom, Washington, United States
- Party: Republican

Thomas C. Van Eaton (July 27, 1862 – October 13, 1951) was an American politician in the state of Washington. He founded the town of Eatonville, Washington in 1889. He served in the Washington House of Representatives from 1895 to 1897. Van Eaton unsuccessfully ran for Congress in 1912, finishing second in the Republican primary in Washington's 2nd congressional district to Albert Johnson.
