= South Hill Mall =

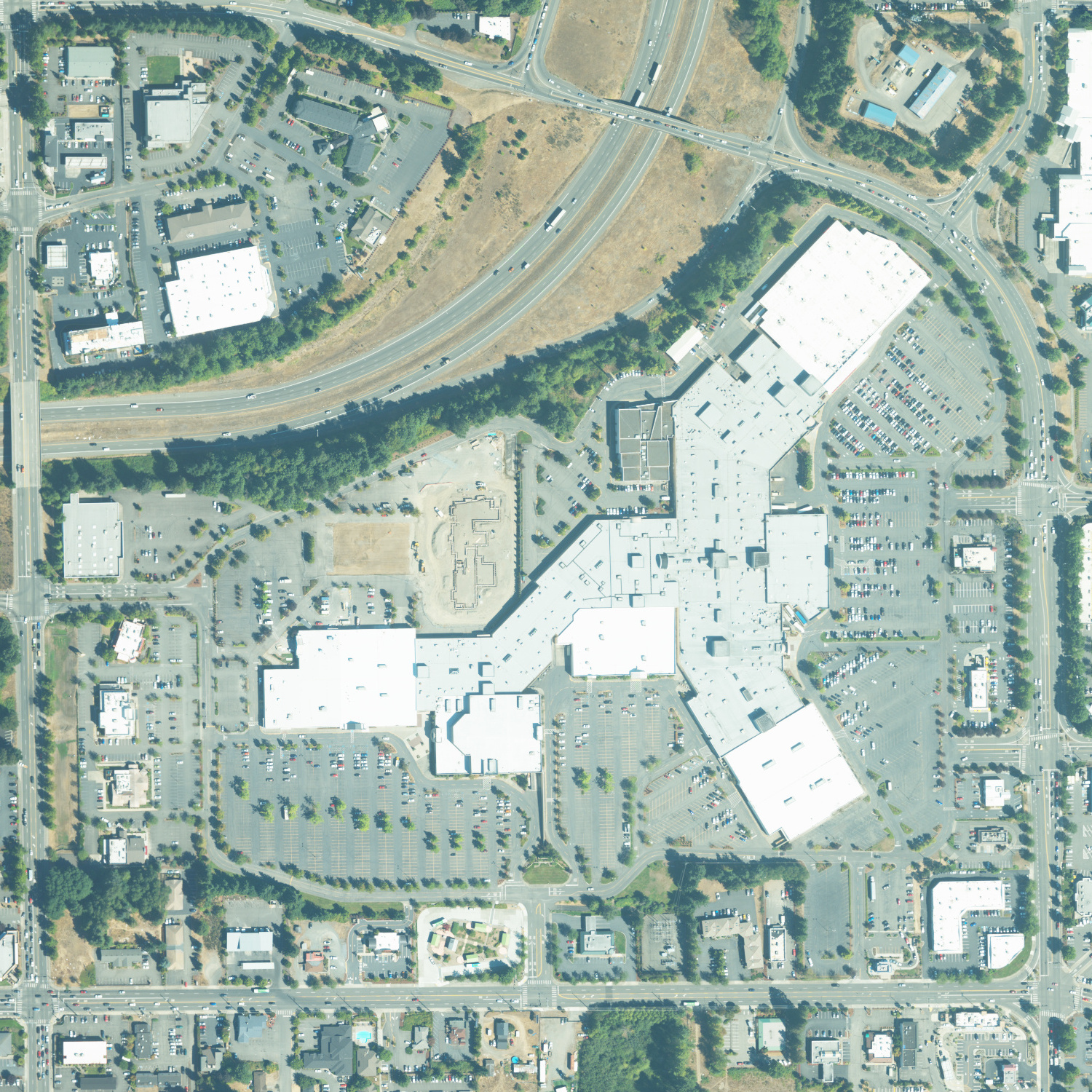
- Aerial view of Mall in August 2023
- Interactive map of Mall location
- Location: Puyallup, Washington, United States
- Coordinates: 47.158°N 122.296°W
- Address: 3500 S. Meridian Avenue
- Opened: 1988
- Developer: Cafaro Company
- Manager: Cafaro Company
- Num. of stores: 100+
- Num. of anchor tenants: 9
- Floor area: 1,074,230 square feet (99,799 m^{2}) (GLA)
- Floors: 1 (2 in former Macy's)
- Website: www.southhillmall.com

South Hill Mall is an enclosed regional shopping mall located in Puyallup, Washington, United States. Opened in 1988 and expanded in 1992, the mall comprises more than 100 stores, plus a food court and movie theater, in 1,074,230 square feet (99,799 m^{2}) of gross leasable area. The mall is managed by Cafaro Company of Youngstown, Ohio.

== History ==
Construction of the South Hill Mall began in October 1987 at the junction of State Route 512 and Meridian Avenue in southern Puyallup. Its first retailers opened on July 20, which was followed by a formal grand opening on May 12, 1989. At the time, the mall included only three anchors, all discount retailers: Mervyn's, Lamonts and Target. Six years later, work began on a westward expansion which added more than 400,000 square feet (37,000 m^{2}) of new retail space, including three new anchors: JCPenney, Sears and The Bon Marché. Office Max (now DSW) and Old Navy were later added as well.

Lamonts was converted to Gottschalks in 2000 when the Lamonts chain was acquired. The Bon Marché was dual-branded as Bon-Macy's in 2003, and then was renamed as just Macy's in 2005, the same year that Gottschalks closed most of the former Lamonts stores. Within a year of its closing, the former Gottschalks anchor was split between Circuit City and Linens 'n Things. Mervyn's closed in 2006 as the chain exited Washington. By May of the same year, it was announced that Kohl's, a chain based in Wisconsin, had acquired the former Mervyn's store, although the mall's manager later said that Kohl's had no plans to open a store in the mall. A multimillion-dollar renovation of the mall also began in 2009, starting with a renovation of the food court. In addition, JCPenney moved its women's departments to the former Mervyn's, while retaining all other departments in the existing store. Dick's Sporting Goods opened its first Washington state location in April 2010, replacing the spaces vacated by Circuit City and Linens 'n Things.

On October 15, 2018, it was announced that Sears would be closing as part of a plan to close 142 stores nationwide. As of 2022, the former Sears location has been converted to a Round 1 entertainment center. The remaining space of the former Sears was eventually converted into two new tenants.

On January 9, 2025, it was announced that Macy's would be closing as part of a plan to close 66 stores nationwide. The store closed in March 2025. The 114,400-square-foot (10,630 m^{2}), two-floored space was converted into the discount store Discount Collection, which opened on June 1, 2025.
