= Loveland, Washington =

Coordinates: 47°03′50″N 122°24′32″W

Loveland, Washington is a community located northeast of the current city of Roy, Washington.
