= Mashel River =

- Location of the mouth of the Mashel River in Washington Mashel River (the United States)

Location
- Country: United States
- State: Washington
- County: Pierce County
- City: Eatonville, Washington

Physical characteristics
- Source: An unnamed lake
  - location: Cascade Range, Pierce County, Washington
  - coordinates: 46°50′33″N 122°1′26″W
  - elevation: 4,340 ft (1,320 m)
- Mouth: Nisqually River
  - location: Southwest of Eatonville, Pierce County, Washington
  - coordinates: 46°50′31″N 122°20′2″W
  - elevation: 482 ft (147 m)
- Basin size: 80.7 sq mi (209 km^{2})
- Discharge
  - location: near La Grande, 3.3 miles (5.3 km) from mouth
  - average: 221 cu ft/s (6.3 m^{3}/s)
  - minimum: 4.1 cu ft/s (0.12 m^{3}/s)
  - maximum: 5,570 cu ft/s (158 m^{3}/s)

The Mashel River is a river in Pierce County, in the U.S. state of Washington. It is a tributary of the Nisqually River, which it enters about 3.6 miles (5.8 km) southwest of Eatonville, at Nisqually river mile 39.6.

== Course ==
The Mashel River's headwaters are a tiny, unnamed lake about 5.1 miles (8.2 km) northwest of Mount Beljica. The river starts off as a small stream flowing northwest before turning west then south, where the South Fork Mashel River joins, after which the Mashel turns west. The Mashel River is joined by Busy Wild Creek and then, about 3.5 miles downstream, Beaver Creek. The Mashel continues west for about 2.7 miles then turns southwest, along the southern city limits of Eatonville, which it follows for about 1.7 miles. The river is joined by the Little Mashel River a mere 380 feet (120 m) after leaving Eatonville's city limits. George Smallwood Park, named for one of the former mayors of Eatonville, is located about 0.8 miles above the Little Mashel River confluence. After the Little Mashel confluence the Mashel flows west for another 1.1 miles before passing under Highway 7 and gradually turning south and emptying into the Nisqually River.

== South Fork ==
The South Fork Mashel River begins at the outlet of another tiny, unnamed lake which is 0.6 miles due east of the lake where the main fork begins and just 29 feet (8.8 m) lower in elevation. It flows generally northwest from its source to its mouth, a distance of about 4.3 miles (6.9 km). The South Fork has no major tributaries but receives many minor streams. Near its mouth the South Fork flows over a waterfall.

== Boxcar Canyon ==
Boxcar Canyon is a stretch of river that ends about 1 mile upstream from Eatonville. People often come to the canyon to camp, build fires, party, swim, cliff jump and more. Due to the amount of irresponsible behaviors that come with that, the river, canyon, and area around the canyon have been badly polluted. The city of Eatonville has made efforts lately to clean up the area including a big cleanup in 2004 which ended up hardly making an impact. The canyon was even closed and signs were posted in an attempt to discourage people from mistreating the land. Within days, most of the signs were defaced or removed.

The railroad trestle crossing Boxcar Canyon near Walker Road caught fire and burned down in the late 1970s or early 1980s. The tall creosote timber structure burned readily.

As a result of all the vandalism as well as pollution, it is now difficult or impossible for fish to spawn in the canyon where spawning used to be very common.

In an effort to help save the fish that formerly spawned in the canyon, the Nisqually Land Trust has purchased the canyon and some of the land around it. They also purchased a large section of river and nearby land just downstream from Eatonville as well.

== Fish ==
The Mashel River is home to four types of salmonids: rainbow trout (steelhead), Chinook salmon, coho salmon, and pink salmon. Of these, the steelhead and Chinook salmon are the most endangered.

== Logjams ==
Recently, logjams have been inserted into the river in hope that salmon will be able to spawn better. A lot of the trees along the river, especially along the upper sections, have been logged so there are less trees to create natural log jams. The logjams trap leaves and create deep pools. Salmon travelling upstream can rest in these pools. The coho salmon have benefited the most from these logjams.

== Tributaries ==
- Beaver Creek
- Busy Wild Creek
- Little Mashel River

== See also ==
- Little Mashel River Waterfalls
- List of rivers in Washington
