= Roy, Washington =

- City
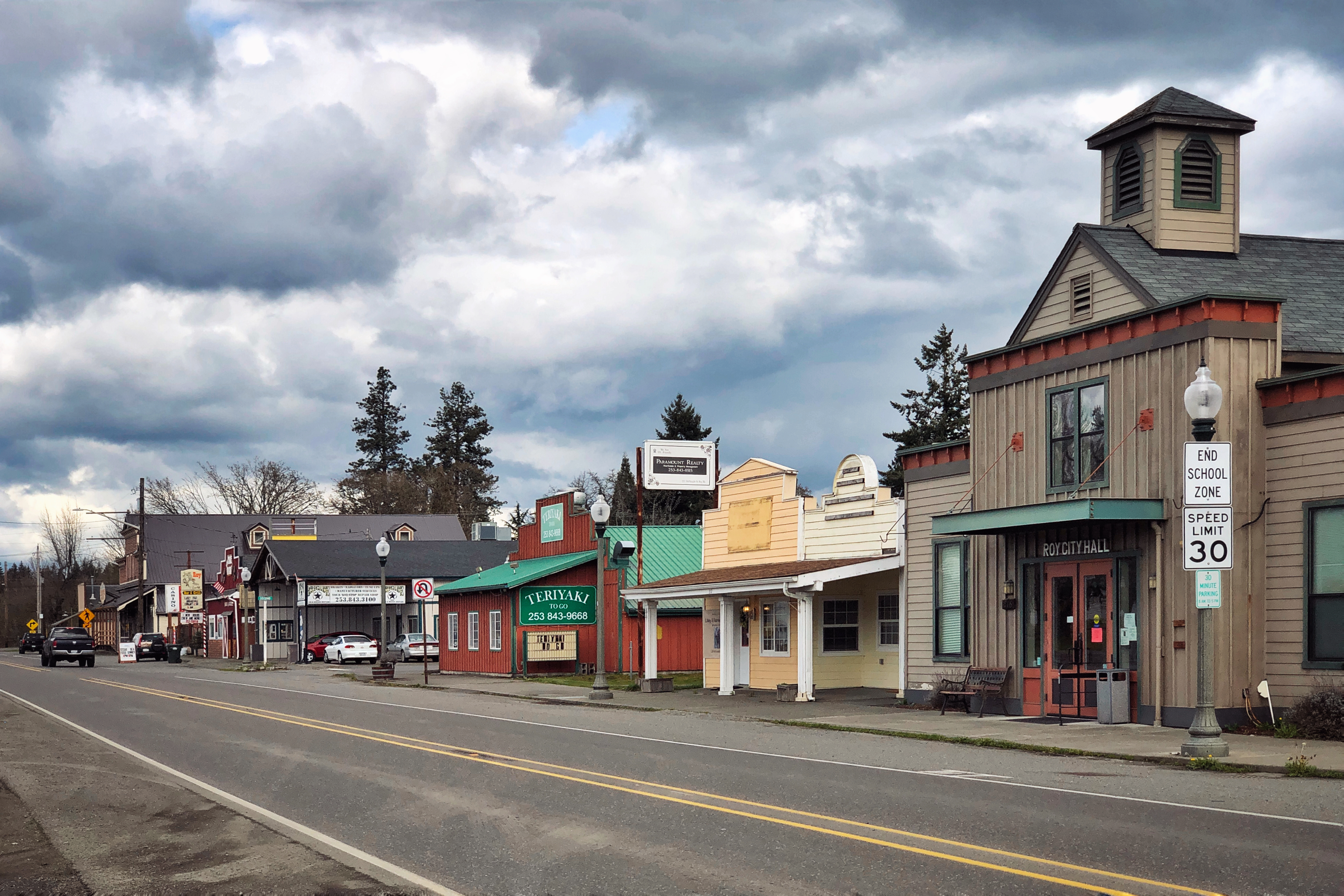
- McNaught Rd S, Roy, WA.
- Interactive location map of Roy
- Coordinates: 46°59′50″N 122°32′35″W
- Country: United States
- State: Washington
- County: Pierce
- Incorporated: January 16, 1908

Government
  - Type: Mayor–council
  - Mayor: Kimber Ivy

Area
  - Total: 0.48 sq mi (1.25 km^{2})
  - Land: 0.48 sq mi (1.25 km^{2})
  - Water: 0 sq mi (0.00 km^{2})
- Elevation: 331 ft (101 m)

Population (2020)
  - Total: 816
  - Density: 1,701.3/sq mi (656.88/km^{2})
- Time zone: UTC-8 (Pacific (PST))
  - Summer (DST): UTC-7 (PDT)
- ZIP code: 98580
- Area code: 253
- FIPS code: 53-60160
- GNIS feature ID: 2411010
- Website: cityofroywa.us

Roy is a city in Pierce County, Washington, United States. The population was 816 at the 2020 census.

== History ==
Roy was officially incorporated on January 16, 1908. It is a rural city outside Tacoma and primarily features ranch-style homes and farms. Roy was one of the early communities in the area, a prosperous boom-town and a major stop on the railroad line. But 3 major blows reduced this once-thriving town to its current form. A major fire in 1929 wiped out most of the downtown businesses just before the Depression started. The railroad eventually discontinued using Roy as a main stop. The Army annexed most of the surrounding land to the north and west, limiting expansion and the local tax base, and erasing the nearby community of Loveland.

Major features and/or attractions in Roy and the vicinity include the Roy Pioneer Rodeo, attracting participants and spectators from several states and Canada.

== Geography ==
According to the United States Census Bureau, the city has a total area of 0.49 square miles (1.27 km^{2}), all of it land.

Although the intersection of SR 7 and SR 507 is known as the Roy "Y", the intersection is in Spanaway, about seven miles northeast of Roy.

== Demographics ==
Historical population
Census	Pop.	Note	%±
1910	315		—
1920	287		−8.9%
1930	284		−1.0%
1940	261		−8.1%
1950	263		0.8%
1960	264		0.4%
1970	381		44.3%
1980	417		9.4%
1990	258		−38.1%
2000	260		0.8%
2010	793		205.0%
2020	816		2.9%
U.S. Decennial Census; 2020 Census

=== 2020 census ===
As of the 2020 census, Roy had a population of 816. The median age was 35.2 years. 24.1% of residents were under the age of 18 and 10.9% of residents were 65 years of age or older. For every 100 females there were 98.1 males, and for every 100 females age 18 and over there were 95.3 males age 18 and over.

0.0% of residents lived in urban areas, while 100.0% lived in rural areas.

There were 292 households in Roy, of which 42.1% had children under the age of 18 living in them. Of all households, 56.8% were married-couple households, 13.7% were households with a male householder and no spouse or partner present, and 18.5% were households with a female householder and no spouse or partner present. About 13.6% of all households were made up of individuals and 4.8% had someone living alone who was 65 years of age or older.

There were 315 housing units, of which 7.3% were vacant. The homeowner vacancy rate was 0.5% and the rental vacancy rate was 13.1%.

Racial composition as of the 2020 census
Race	Number	Percent
White	623	76.3%
Black or African American	24	2.9%
American Indian and Alaska Native	10	1.2%
Asian	28	3.4%
Native Hawaiian and Other Pacific Islander	6	0.7%
Some other race	22	2.7%
Two or more races	103	12.6%
Hispanic or Latino (of any race)	58	7.1%

=== 2010 census ===
As of the 2010 census, there were 793 people, 303 households, and 215 families living in the city. The population density was 1,618.4 inhabitants per square mile (624.9/km^{2}). There were 326 housing units at an average density of 665.3 per square mile (256.9/km^{2}). The racial makeup of the city was 82.0% White, 3.2% African American, 2.4% Native American, 3.7% Asian, 0.9% Pacific Islander, 0.8% from other races, and 7.2% from two or more races. Hispanic or Latino of any race were 3.8% of the population.

There were 303 households, of which 38.3% had children under the age of 18 living with them, 49.8% were married couples living together, 14.9% had a female householder with no husband present, 6.3% had a male householder with no wife present, and 29.0% were non-families. 22.8% of all households were made up of individuals, and 6.3% had someone living alone who was 65 years of age or older. The average household size was 2.62 and the average family size was 3.07.

The median age in the city was 35.9 years. 26% of residents were under the age of 18; 9.8% were between the ages of 18 and 24; 29% were from 25 to 44; 26.6% were from 45 to 64; and 8.6% were 65 years of age or older. The gender makeup of the city was 49.9% male and 50.1% female.

=== 2000 census ===
As of the 2000 census, there were 260 people, 102 households, and 68 families living in the city. The population density was 995.2 people per square mile (386.1/km^{2}). There were 114 housing units at an average density of 436.4 per square mile (169.3/km^{2}). The racial makeup of the city was 81.15% White, 0.77% African American, 3.46% Native American, 2.31% Asian, 3.85% from other races, and 8.46% from two or more races. Hispanic or Latino of any race were 8.08% of the population.

There were 102 households, out of which 32.4% had children under the age of 18 living with them, 48.0% were married couples living together, 12.7% had a female householder with no husband present, and 32.4% were non-families. 23.5% of all households were made up of individuals, and 15.7% had someone living alone who was 65 years of age or older. The average household size was 2.55 and the average family size was 2.96.

In the city, the age distribution of the population shows 26.2% under the age of 18, 11.5% from 18 to 24, 28.5% from 25 to 44, 23.5% from 45 to 64, and 10.4% who were 65 years of age or older. The median age was 34 years. For every 100 females, there were 97.0 males. For every 100 females age 18 and over, there were 97.9 males.

The median income for a household in the city was $32,727, and the median income for a family was $34,643. Males had a median income of $31,964 versus $21,477 for females. The per capita income for the city was $14,527. About 6.8% of families and 10.8% of the population were below the poverty line, including 12.1% of those under the age of eighteen and none of those 65 or over.

== Notable people ==
- Morgan Hicks, 2004 Olympian in women's three position rifle
- Robin Hobb, fantasy author
- Victor L. Kandle, World War II Medal of Honor recipient
