= Washington State Route 704 =

State highway in Pierce County, Washington, US

State Route 704

- Map of southwestern Pierce County with the proposed route of SR 704 highlighted in red.

Route information
- Auxiliary route of SR 7
- Maintained by WSDOT
- Length: 0.63 mi (1,010 m)
- Existed: 2002–present

Major junctions
- West end: Spanaway Loop Road near Spanaway
- East end: SR 7 near Spanaway

Location
- Country: United States
- State: Washington
- County: Pierce

Highway system
- State highways in Washington; Interstate; US; State; Scenic; Pre-1964; 1964 renumbering; Former
← SR 702	→ I-705

State Route 704 (known as SR 704 or the Cross-Base Highway) is a state highway located entirely in Pierce County, Washington, United States. It is intended to provide access between Interstate 5 (I-5) and SR 7 by passing through a portion of Joint Base Lewis–McChord, a major U.S. military installation. The designated route comprises a short, 0.6-mile (0.97 km) section near SR 7 in Spanaway. The full 6-mile (9.7 km) highway is estimated to cost $480 million to construct, but remains unfunded.

== Route description ==
The legislative definition of SR 704 begins at I-5 near Lakewood on the northwest side of Joint Base Lewis–McChord, a U.S. military installation. The signed portion of the highway begins at milepost 5.92, an intersection with Spanaway Loop Road south of Spanaway Lake. The highway travels east for 0.63 miles (1.01 km) between Joint Base Lewis–McChord and a residential neighborhood to its eastern terminus, an intersection with SR 7 at 176th Street East. The signed section of SR 704 is wholly contained within the unincorporated community of Spanaway in southern Pierce County.

The signed portion of SR 704 is a divided highway with five lanes—three eastbound and two westbound—separated by a median barrier. It is maintained by the Washington State Department of Transportation (WSDOT), which conducts an annual survey of traffic volume that is expressed in terms of annual average daily traffic. The lone counting station on SR 704, at Spanaway Lake Road, measured an average of 22,000 vehicles using the highway in 2016.

== History ==
The Pierce County government proposed the construction of a new highway connecting I-5 to SR 7 south of McChord Air Force Base in the late 1980s to address congestion on nearby highways. The route would follow the perimeter between McChord Air Force Base and neighboring Fort Lewis, terminating at Thorne Lane in Tillicum in the west and Spanaway in the east. The proposal, dubbed the Cross-Base Highway, was forwarded to the state government, U.S. Army, and U.S. Air Force for consideration. The county government studied eight routes for the highway and eliminated four in 1992 after being unable to reduce impacts to the Fort Lewis Logistics Center. The remaining options were determined to have adverse affects on American Lake Gardens, a residential neighborhood near the Thorne Lake interchange, generating protests.

In 2002, the state legislature assigned SR 704 to the Cross-Base Highway and earmarked part of the $127 million in funding needed for the project. The Federal Highway Administration issued a record of decision that approved the project in 2004, allowing for land acquisition and engineering to begin. The project remained opposed by environmental and conservation groups seeking to limit urban sprawl and the encroachment on the habitats of endangered species. $50 million in funding for the project was proposed as part of the 2007 Roads and Transit ballot measure, which was rejected by voters. Earlier versions of the package omitted SR 704 in favor of widening other streets and addressing needs on other Pierce County highways.

=== Environmental lawsuit ===
In July 2010, a coalition of local businesses, conservation organizations, and equestrian clubs filed a lawsuit against the Federal Highway Administration, WSDOT, and Pierce County to prevent construction of the proposed highway. Because the project has no funding and thus no construction schedule, the parties agreed to a stay of proceedings on October 15.

The coalition contended that the agencies failed to follow the Endangered Species Act, the National Environmental Policy Act, and failed to adequately consider reasonable alternatives. The coalition reports that the proposed highway would bisect the largest remnant oak woodland-prairie left in the Puget Sound area. The US Fish and Wildlife Service describes the area as "possibly the rarest habitat in North America," home to at least 29 species of federal and/or state threatened, endangered, candidate, and sensitive plant and animal species of concern, 18 of which are in the immediate vicinity of the proposed highway.

Drawing comparisons with Mt. Rainier National Park and Nisqually National Wildlife Area, Pierce County's Biodiversity Network Assessment describes the area as "the most biologically and ecologically rich area remaining in the lower elevations of Pierce County." The County predicts that these diverse habitats support 20 state or federally listed species, 24 Priority Habitat and Species, and 10 at-risk species, and dozens of other plants and animals.

The project's Environmental Impact Statement states,

None of the areas affected by the project are quality prairie habitat; most of the grasslands are non-native. The alignment was purposely placed to avoid wetlands. The Douglas-fir forest habitat is all second-growth; most is in even-aged stands with little structural diversity and is considered to be invasive to oak woodland and prairie habitats. The grassland habitats with some native prairie species intersected by the proposed alignment occur at two locations. The first is a mowed field with few native plants west of Lake Mondress that is also heavily used as a practice arena by equestrian enthusiasts. The second location is southeast of Lake Mondress, where the alignment skirts the northern edge of a prairie habitat mostly invaded by Scot's broom. The intersection point is at a disturbed railway junction. Both locations support prairie habitat. The remaining areas are disturbed fields dominated by weedy Scot's broom. In summary, the project does not affect grasslands or prairie of the type referred to in this comment.

The EIS also states that "By 2025, most of the freeway and arterial street systems will operate at [Level of Service] F conditions with volume/capacity (V/C) ratios well above 1.0." This means very heavy congestion and gridlock during most of the day.

Furthermore, the proposed highway will increase climate impacts by increasing driving distance. The EIS states that "Overall, people would travel a little farther to use the new Cross-Base Highway project to avoid other congested highways and arterials; this would increase miles driven."

A contrary view was expressed by Pierce County Executive John Ladenburg, who believes that it would be "environmentally irresponsible not to build that highway," because SR 704 will lessen development in the Puyallup Valley farmlands.

=== Construction and cancellation ===
The Washington State Department of Transportation (WSDOT) planned to extend the highway to be 6 miles (9.7 km) long, originating at Interstate 5 in the Tillicum neighborhood of Lakewood, Washington. A four-lane, divided highway with four intersections over its entire length, SR 704 may improve access to and between the military installations by providing an exclusive roadway between Fort Lewis and McChord AFB. It could also connect the developing industrial areas of DuPont and Frederickson as well as provide an east–west alternate thoroughfare to overcrowded SR 512.

After voters rejected a November 2007 ballot measure which would fund the construction, most of the project was put on hold. However, on June 20, 2008, the WSDOT awarded a $7.35 million contract to Ceccanti Inc. for widening of the eastern 0.7 miles (1.1 km) of the route between Spanaway Loop Road and State Route 7. Groundbreaking was July 30, 2008. Assistant Project Engineer John Ho says that the project was scheduled to be completed by 2017 at the earliest. As of 2026, the project remains on hold until further action is taken by the state legislature.

The WSDOT puts the 2007 price tag for the highway at $480 million. However, only $43 million has been funded, requiring at least $437 million. Of this gap, only $50 million had been expected to be funded by a failed 2007 ballot initiative which in the end did not include the project.

In August 2017, the Federal Highway Administration rescinded its record of decision for the project, which had been issued in 2004.

== Major intersections ==
The entire route is in Pierce County.

Location	mi	km	Destinations	Notes
	0.00	0.00	Spanaway Loop Road	At-grade intersection
	0.63	1.01	SR 7 – Spanaway, Elk Plain	At-grade intersection
1.000 mi = 1.609 km; 1.000 km = 0.621 mi
