= Tacoma Rail =

Railroad in Tacoma, Washington

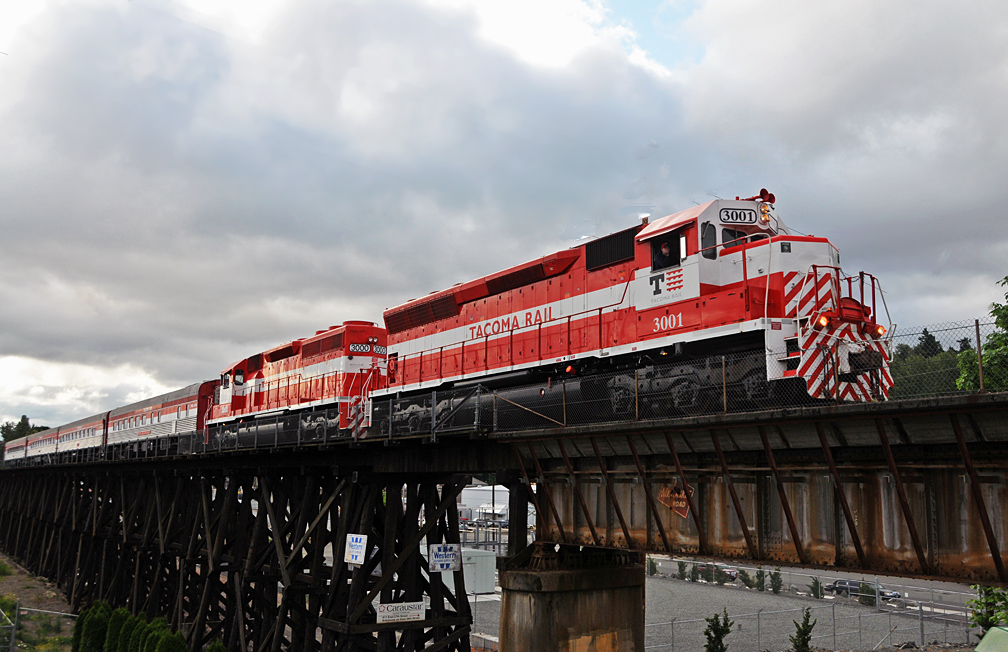
- #3001, an EMD SD40-2, leads a passenger excursion over the ex-Milwaukee Road trestle in 2011.

Overview
- Headquarters: Tacoma, Washington
- Reporting mark: TMBL, TRMW
- Locale: Tacoma, Washington
- Dates of operation: 1994–
- Predecessor: 2nd Chehalis Western Railroad

Technical
- Track gauge: 4 ft 8 1/2 in (1,435 mm) standard gauge
- Length: 140 mi (230 km)

Tacoma Rail (reporting marks TMBL, TRMW) is a publicly owned Class III shortline railroad. It is owned by the city of Tacoma, Washington and operated as a public utility. It is one of three operating divisions of the municipally owned Tacoma Public Utilities service, but unlike other city services, the railroad is self-supported and generates revenue for the City of Tacoma and Washington State. Tacoma Rail provides freight switching services, serving the Port of Tacoma and customers in Tacoma, south Pierce County and formerly parts of Thurston County. It operates 16 diesel locomotives, more than 100 employees, and about 140 miles (230 km) of track, many of which are former Milwaukee Road and BNSF Railway lines around Western Washington.

== Operating divisions ==
Tacoma Rail operates two distinct divisions:

=== Tidelands division ===
The Tidelands division serves the area around the Port of Tacoma, including all four intermodal terminals and interchanging with both the BNSF Railway and the Union Pacific Railroad. The division serves 40 customers, and handles the majority of Tacoma Rail’s traffic.

The division was established in 1914 as a streetcar line to move port workers but has been freight-only since 1937. In the past, the division was called the Tacoma Municipal Belt Line and ran buses until 1947.

=== Lakewood division ===
The Lakewood division runs between Tacoma and DuPont. The operation of the division was acquired from BNSF Railway in November 2004.

The division serves 11 customers, mostly in the Lakewood area. Sound Transit also owns tracks and has trackage rights between Tacoma and Lakewood to operate its Sounder commuter rail. WSDOT has paid to improve the line in recent years with plans to reroute the Amtrak Cascades and Coast Starlight to the tracks planned for 2019.

== Former divisions ==
=== Mountain division ===
The Mountain division ran between Tacoma and Frederickson, where it splits into two branches, one serving McKenna, the other serving Eatonville and Morton.

The 97 miles of track were owned directly by the City of Tacoma and are operated by Tacoma Rail under contract. It was considered a separate railroad and was operated using its own TRMW reporting mark. This segment of track was originally built by the Milwaukee Road and later used by the 2nd Chehalis Western Railroad and was purchased by the city on August 12, 1994.

The division served as many as 14 customers at one time, mostly in the Frederickson area. The Mount Rainier Scenic Railroad leased the portion of track from Eatonville to Morton for passenger excursion service. MRSR ceased operating due to the COVID-19 pandemic, but has reopened under new ownership and starting running trains in September 2023.

Due to dwindling customer base (one as of 2023), Tacoma Rail sold the Mountain Division to WRL, which is now Rainier Rail, with RNIR reporting marks. However, the City will retain ownership of the portion of the Tacoma to Fredrickson line within the city limits, about six miles of track and structure, minus a one-mile stretch sold to Sound Transit for use by passenger and commuter trains as part of Sound Transit’s Lakewood Subdivision. This leaves just under five miles of track, for which Tacoma Rail will file for abandonment. This section is the costliest to maintain and includes the steepest part of the line, a 3.75% grade, a bridge over the BNSF/UP lines and a bridge and trestle over the Puyallup River, both of which are former Milwaukee Road structures built in 1917.

WRL/Rainier Rail plans to use its portion of the north end of the Mountain Division (north of Frederickson) for car storage. There are four sidings, but two of them will require some significant work to be put back in service.

The line is severed by derailers at 72nd and McKinley, which is effectively the city limits. Most crossing markers south of this location have had electrical equipment removed and is completely idle as of November 2023.

== Locomotive fleet ==
Locomotive fleet (as of March 2021)

Unit No.	Builder	Model	Year Built	Purchased	Notes
TMBL 1521	EMD	MP15DC	1982	5/3/2003	ex FNM 9823; née NDM 9823
TMBL 1522	EMD	MP15AC	1982	5/3/2003	ex FNM 9824; née NDM 9824
TMBL 1523	EMD	MP15AC	1982	5/3/2003	ex FNM 9825; née NDM 9825
TMBL 1524	EMD	MP15AC	1982	5/3/2003	ex FNM 9822; née NDM 9822
TMBL 1525	EMD	MP15AC	1983	2021	ex TFM 1037, rebuilt by Progress Rail in 2021
TMBL 1526	EMD	MP15AC	1983	2021	ex TFM 1043, rebuilt by Progress Rail in 2021
TMBL 2100	NRE	3GS21B-DE	2011	8/26/2011	
TMBL 2200	EMD	GP22ECO	2011	11/21/2011	ex KXHR GP40 40; ex CDAC 40; ex CSX 6633; née BO 4058 (built 10/1971)
TMBL 2201	EMD	GP22ECO	2011	12/15/2011	
TMBL 2316	EMD	GP23ECO	2016	8/1/2016	
TMBL 3000	EMD	SD40	1968	5/26/1999	ex NREX 3065; ex PNCX 3065; ex UP 3065; née MP 765; Sold to Rainier Rail as part of Mountain Division
TMBL 3001	EMD	SD40-2	1985	6/11/2001	ex NREX 6564; ex CNW SD45 6564; ex CR 6237; née PC 6237; sold to Rainier Rail as part of Mountain Division
TMBL 3801	EMD	GP38-2	1979	5/3/2005	ex UP 386; née CNW 4621l;
TMBL 3802	EMD	GP38-2	1979	6/29/2005	ex NREX 4618; née CNW 4618
TMBL 4001	EMD	GP40-M	1965	9/30/2005	ex CNW 5526; ex CR 3037; ex PC 3037; née NYC 3037
TMBL 4002	EMD	GP40-M	1965	12/30/2005	ex CNW 5528; ex CR 3039; ex PC 3039; née NYC 3039
TMBL 7001	EMD	SD70ACe-P4	2013	11/14/2013	ex EMDX 1211 (was leased, now returned, was used on mountain division)
TMBL 7002	EMD	SD70ACe-P4	2013	11/14/2013	ex EMDX 1212 (was leased, now returned, was used on mountain division)
