= McKenna, Washington =

Unincorporated community in Washington, United States

McKenna
- Unincorporated community
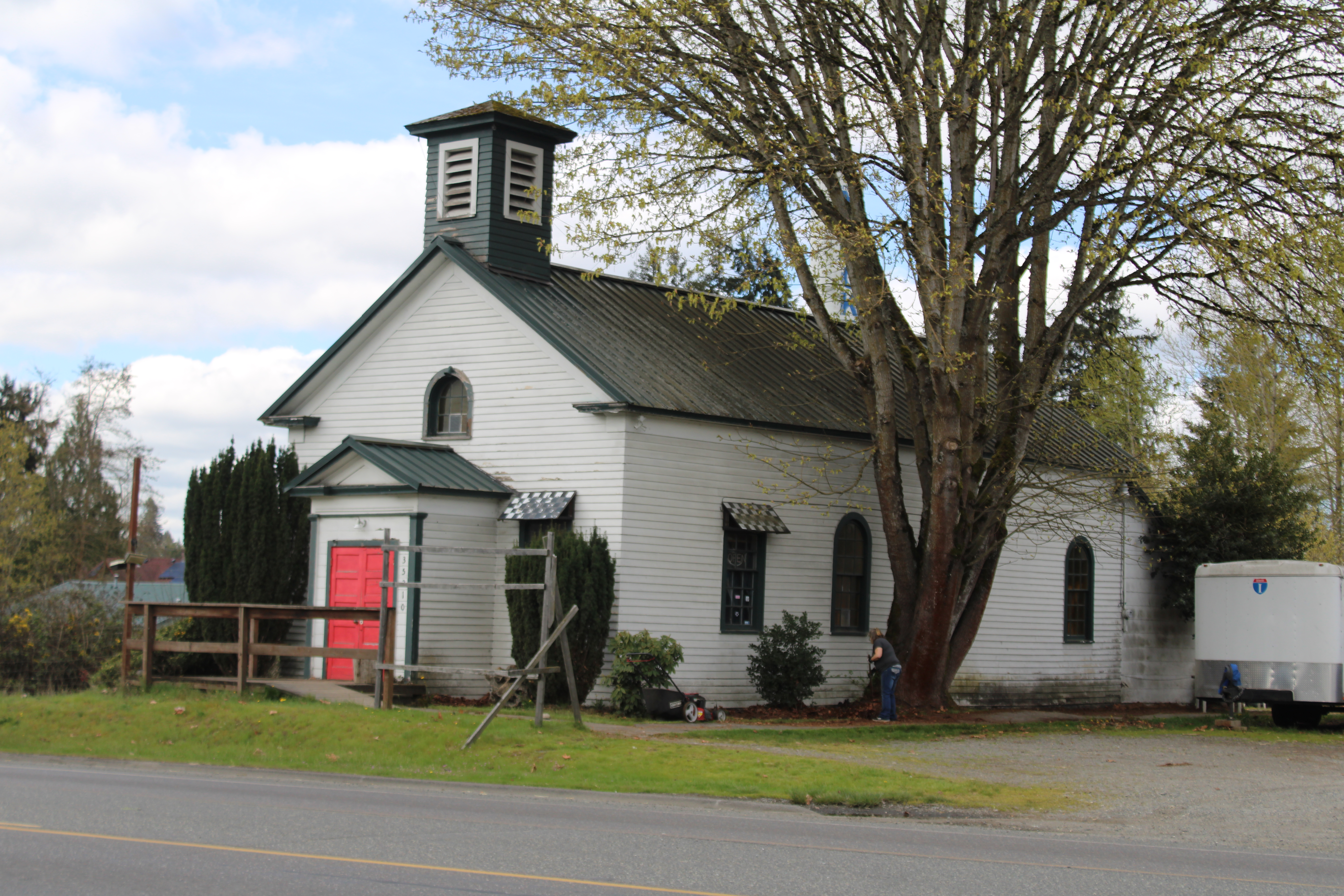

- Location within the state of Washington
- Coordinates: 46°56′12″N 122°33′00″W
- Country: United States
- State: Washington
- County: Pierce

Area
  - Total: 1.08 sq mi (2.8 km^{2})
  - Land: 1.04 sq mi (2.7 km^{2})
  - Water: 0.04 sq mi (0.10 km^{2})
- Elevation: 335 ft (102 m)

Population (2000)
  - Total: 678
  - Density: 652/sq mi (252/km^{2})
- Time zone: UTC-8 (Pacific (PST))
  - Summer (DST): UTC-7 (PDT)
- ZIP Code: 98558
- Area code(s): 360, 564
- GNIS feature ID: 2585001

McKenna is an unincorporated community in Pierce County, Washington, United States, located on State Route 507 and the Nisqually River, east of Yelm.

Founded around 1908, McKenna is a former timber company town.

== Demographics ==
Historical population
Census	Pop.	Note	%±
2010	716		—
2020	678		−5.3%
U.S. Decennial Census; 2000 2010

McKenna first appeared as a census designated place in the 2010 U.S. census.

=== Racial and ethnic composition ===
McKenna CDP, Washington – Racial and ethnic composition Note: the US Census treats Hispanic/Latino as an ethnic category. This table excludes Latinos from the racial categories and assigns them to a separate category. Hispanics/Latinos may be of any race.
Race / Ethnicity (NH = Non-Hispanic)	Pop 2010	Pop 2020	% 2010	% 2020
White alone (NH)	627	517	87.57%	76.25%
Black or African American alone (NH)	14	14	1.96%	2.06%
Native American or Alaska Native alone (NH)	3	4	0.42%	0.59%
Asian alone (NH)	6	5	0.84%	0.74%
Native Hawaiian or Pacific Islander alone (NH)	0	0	0.00%	0.00%
Other race alone (NH)	0	4	0.00%	0.59%
Mixed race or Multiracial (NH)	31	60	4.33%	8.85%
Hispanic or Latino (any race)	35	74	4.89%	10.91%
Total	716	678	100.00%	100.00%
