= Eatonville, Washington =

- Town
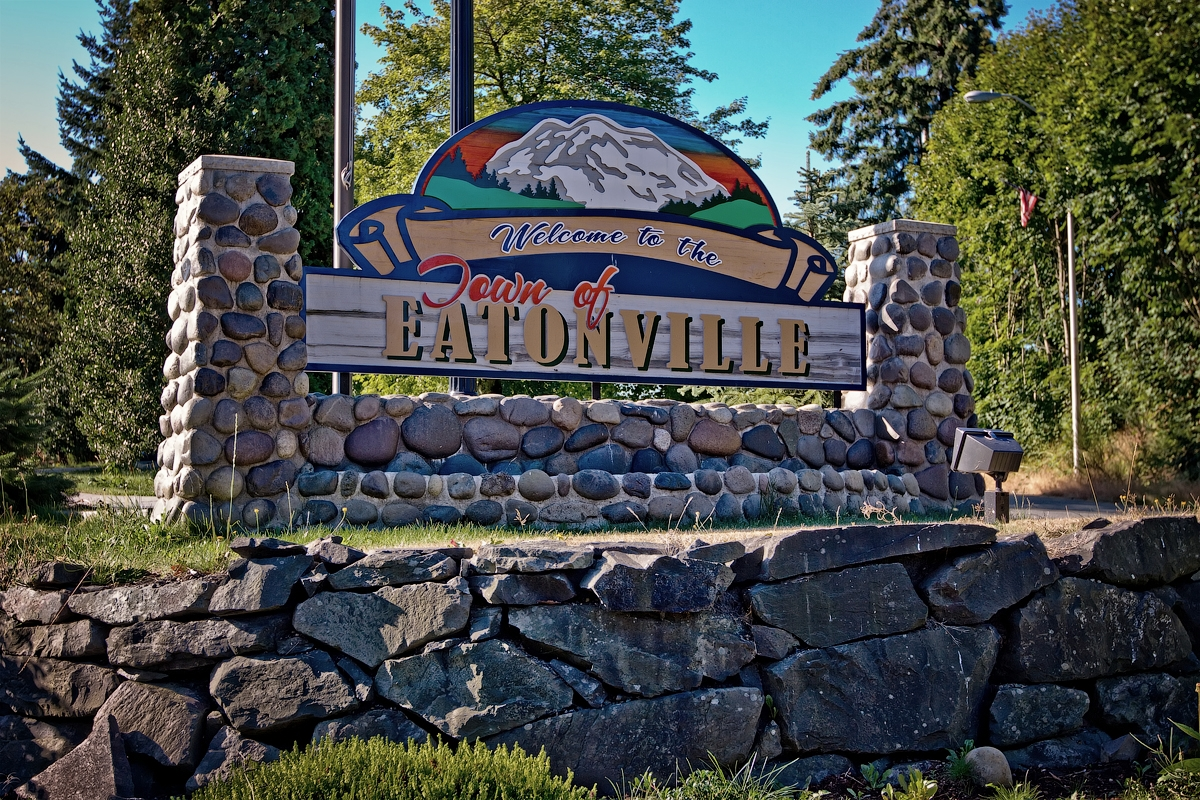
- Welcome sign in Eatonville

- Location of Eatonville, Washington
- Coordinates: 46°52′26″N 122°16′05″W
- Country: United States
- State: Washington
- County: Pierce

Government
  - Type: Mayor–council
  - Mayor: David Baublits

Area
  - Total: 1.85 sq mi (4.78 km^{2})
  - Land: 1.83 sq mi (4.73 km^{2})
  - Water: 0.019 sq mi (0.05 km^{2})
- Elevation: 824 ft (251 m)

Population (2020)
  - Total: 2,845
  - Density: 1,657.3/sq mi (639.89/km^{2})
- Time zone: UTC-8 (Pacific (PST))
  - Summer (DST): UTC-7 (PDT)
- ZIP Code: 98328
- Area code(s): 360, 564
- FIPS code: 53-20260
- GNIS feature ID: 2412463
- Website: eatonville-wa.gov

Eatonville is a town in Pierce County, Washington, United States. It is 32 mi (51 km) south of Tacoma. The population was 2,845 at the 2020 census. The town motto is "Better Together."

== History ==
For centuries, Nisqually people roamed the rivers and streams of the Eatonville area. Leschi, one of the main leaders of Nisqually was born in this area in 1808.

In 1889, Indian Henry was one of the Nisqually who guided the town's Euro-American founder, Thomas C. Van Eaton, from Mashell Prairie to the present site of Eatonville. Legend has it that upon arrival Henry declared, "This is a good place. Not much snow."

Area white settlers and the accompanying Nisqually were in need of goods, which "T.C." provided at his trading post. Supplies were carried by his stage from Spanaway over a rough trail through dense forest. In 1891, the settlers built the town's first school, which is still in use.

For years Eatonville was a waypoint for visitors to Mount Rainier. In 1902, the Tacoma Eastern Railroad arrived, providing freight and passenger service and a vital link to Tacoma. Soon after the railroad's arrival, several small mills sprang up in the vicinity. In the 1970s, the Wildlife park of Northwest Trek was opened and it remains one of the most popular tourist attractions in the area, other than Mount Rainier itself.

Eatonville was officially incorporated on October 28, 1909, after the Eatonville Lumber Company brought in more people to work in its mill. The mill closed in 1954.

On April 27, 2014, an EF0 tornado briefly touched down and caused some minor damage near Eatonville.

== Geography ==
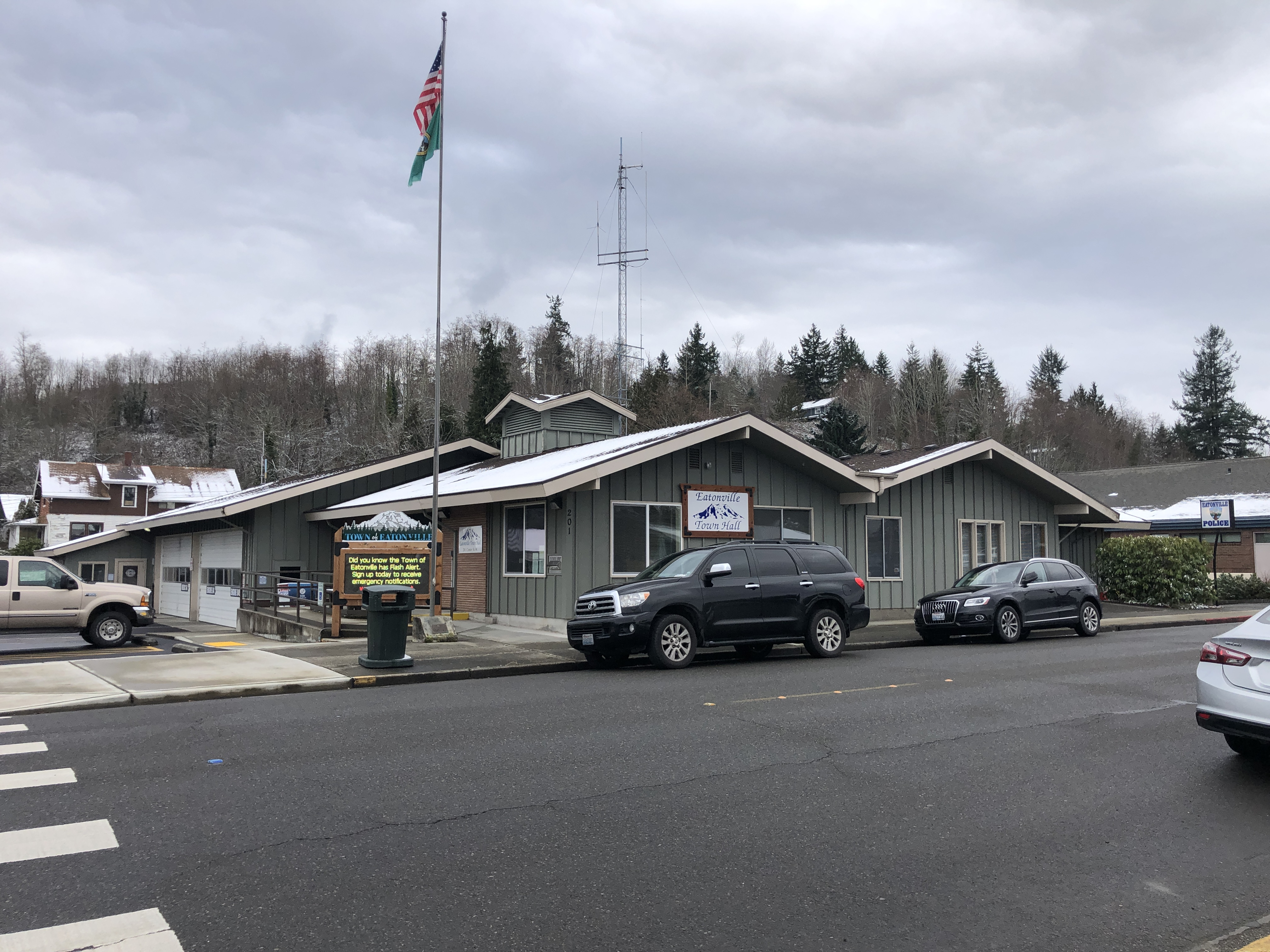
Eatonville Town Hall

According to the United States Census Bureau, the town has a total area of 1.84 square miles (4.77 km^{2}), of which, 1.82 square miles (4.71 km^{2}) is land and 0.02 square miles (0.05 km^{2}) is water.

=== Climate ===
This region experiences warm (but not hot) and dry summers, with no average monthly temperatures above 71.6 F (22 C). According to the Köppen Climate Classification system, Eatonville has a warm-summer Mediterranean climate, abbreviated "Csb" on climate maps.

== Demographics ==
Historical population
Census	Pop.	Note	%±
1910	754		—
1920	861		14.2%
1930	912		5.9%
1940	996		9.2%
1950	1,048		5.2%
1960	896		−14.5%
1970	852		−4.9%
1980	998		17.1%
1990	1,374		37.7%
2000	2,012		46.4%
2010	2,758		37.1%
2020	2,845		3.2%
U.S. Decennial Census; 2020 Census

=== 2010 census ===
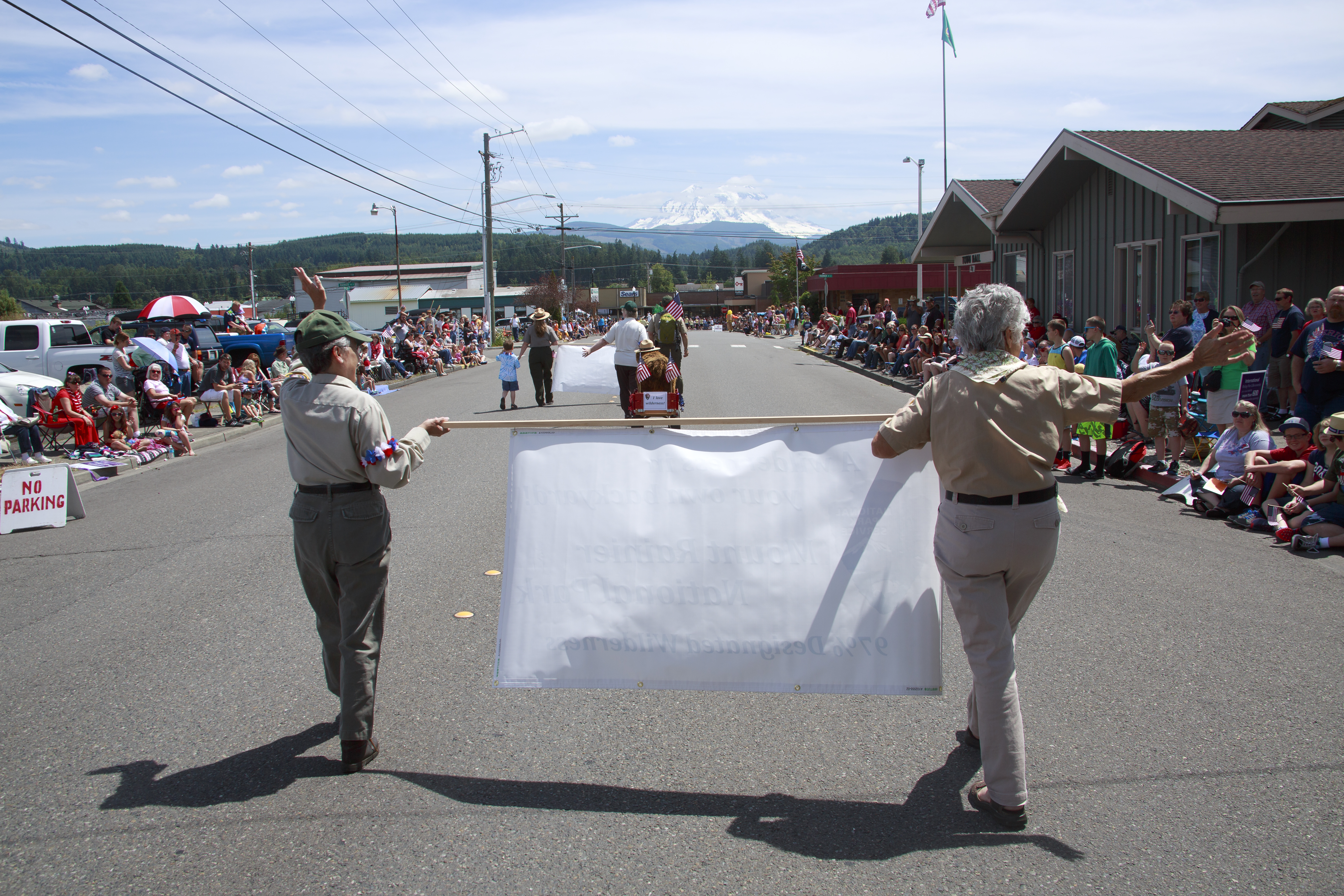
Independence Day parade in 2014. Mount Rainier can be seen in background.

As of the 2010 census, there were 2,758 people, 992 households, and 714 families living in the town. The population density was 1,515.4 inhabitants per square mile (585.1/km^{2}). There were 1,059 housing units at an average density of 581.9 per square mile (224.7/km^{2}). The racial makeup of the town was 90.1% White, 0.5% African American, 1.1% Native American, 0.9% Asian, 0.1% Pacific Islander, 2.9% from other races, and 4.4% from two or more races. Hispanic or Latino of any race were 5.9% of the population.

There were 992 households, of which 41.4% had children under the age of 18 living with them, 54.9% were married couples living together, 10.8% had a female householder with no husband present, 6.3% had a male householder with no wife present, and 28.0% were non-families. 23.1% of all households were made up of individuals, and 11.7% had someone living alone who was 65 years of age or older. The average household size was 2.78 and the average family size was 3.26.

The median age in the town was 34.4 years. 30.4% of residents were under the age of 18; 7.6% were between the ages of 18 and 24; 25.9% were from 25 to 44; 23.5% were from 45 to 64; and 12.6% were 65 years of age or older. The gender makeup of the town was 48.1% male and 51.9% female.

=== 2000 census ===
As of the 2000 census, there were 2,012 people, 748 households, and 542 families living in the town. The population density was 1,176.4 people per square mile (454.3/km^{2}). There were 805 housing units at an average density of 470.7 per square mile (181.8/km^{2}). The racial makeup of the town was 91.35% White, 0.25% African American, 0.75% Native American, 0.80% Asian, 0.65% Pacific Islander, 2.24% from other races, and 3.98% from two or more races. Hispanic or Latino of any race were 4.62% of the population.

There were 748 households, out of which 38.9% had children under the age of 18 living with them, 56.8% were married couples living together, 11.8% had a female householder with no husband present, and 27.5% were non-families. 22.7% of all households were made up of individuals, and 11.2% had someone living alone who was 65 years of age or older. The average household size was 2.69 and the average family size was 3.16.

In the town, the population was spread out, with 31.4% under the age of 18, 8.0% from 18 to 24, 27.8% from 25 to 44, 20.5% from 45 to 64, and 12.4% who were 65 years of age or older. The median age was 34 years. For every 100 females, there were 94.2 males. For every 100 females age 18 and over, there were 89.0 males.

The median income for a household in the town was $43,681, and the median income for a family was $50,733. Males had a median income of $41,950 versus $25,380 for females. The per capita income for the town was $19,513. About 11.0% of families and 11.8% of the population were below the poverty line, including 11.6% of those under age 18 and 9.8% of those age 65 or over.

== Notable people ==
- Mark Fuhrman, former Los Angeles Police detective and key figure in the murder trial of O. J. Simpson
- Lucas Hatton, a professional strongman and reigning America's Strongest Man
- Chase DeMoor, boxer, former football player, and reality star
