= List of dams and reservoirs in Washington =

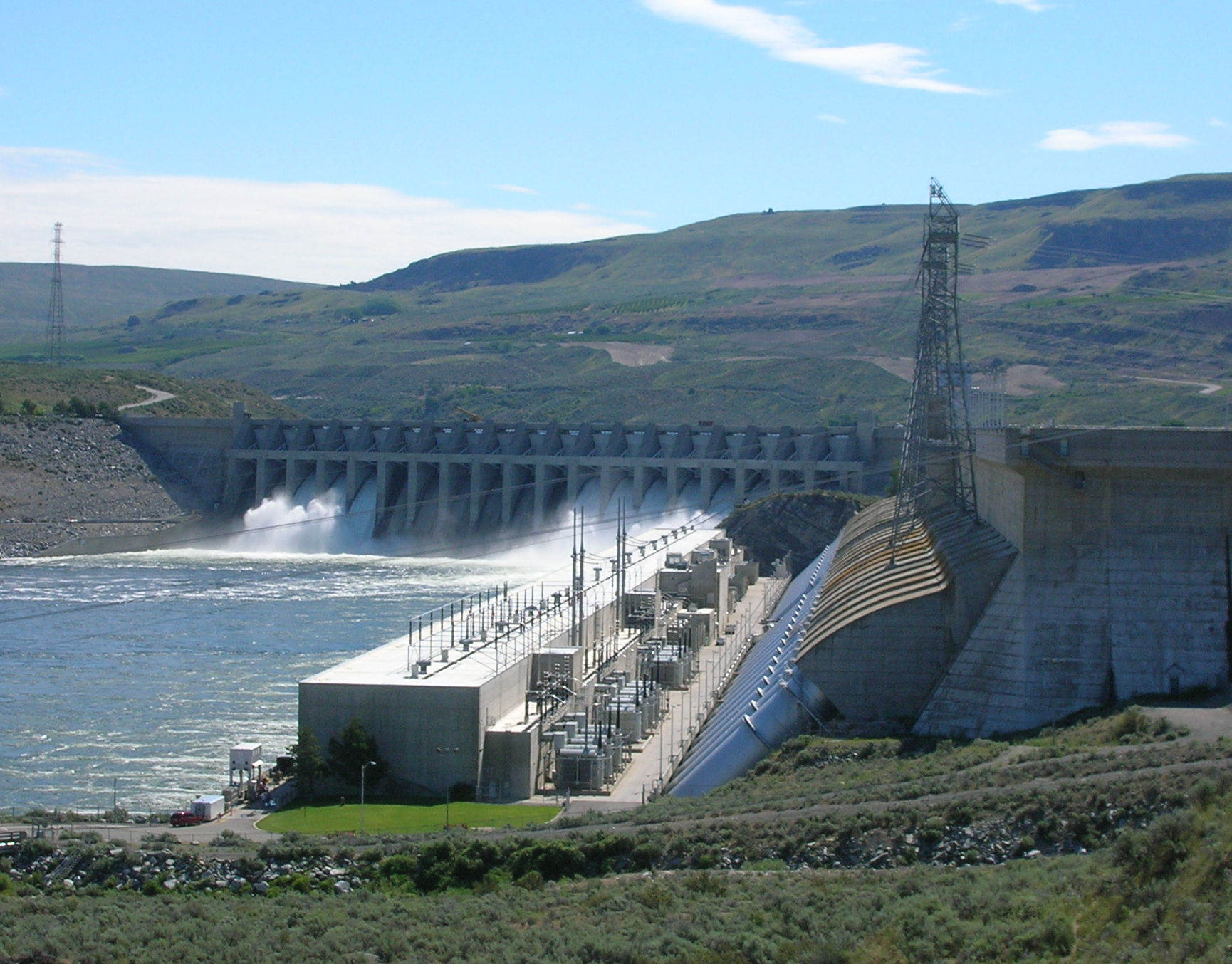
The Chief Joseph Dam, a concrete gravity dam on the Columbia River near Bridgeport, Washington

As of 2023, the U.S. state of Washington has 1,242 dams that are able to impound 10 acre-feet or more of water and are regulated by the Washington State Department of Ecology (DOE). These include dams that produce hydroelectricity and create reservoirs for irrigation, drinking water, or recreational uses. According to the DOE, approximately 52 percent of dams in the state are privately owned, while 31 percent are owned by local governments.

Approximately 87 percent of dams in Washington are earth fill dams, with the second most-common type being concrete gravity dams (6%). Only 113 dams in the state are taller than 50 feet (15 m). King County has 123 dams—the most of any county in the state. The majority of dams were built between 1960 and 1999. Proposals to remove underused dams and restore fish habitats emerged in the early 21st century with support from the state's Native American tribes; the first major dam removal was the Condit Dam near White Salmon in 2011, which was followed by two dams on the Elwha River near Port Angeles. As of 2024, 39 dams in Washington have been removed.

The largest dam in Washington, in terms of structural volume, reservoir capacity, and electricity production, is the Grand Coulee Dam on the Columbia River. It is the largest power station in the United States with a nameplate capacity of 6,809 megawatts and one of the largest concrete structures in the world. The tallest dam is Mossyrock Dam on the Cowlitz River in Lewis County, at 606 feet (185 m). The longest dam is O'Sullivan Dam on Crab Creek, at 19,000 feet (5,800 m); it is among the longest earth fill dams in the United States.

== List ==
Key
† Located on state border with Oregon

Dams and reservoirs in Washington over 25 feet (7.6 m)
Dam	County	River	Reservoir	Type	Installed capacity (MW)	Height		Reservoir capacity		Year	Owner	Primary purpose(s)
Dam	County	River	Reservoir	Type	Installed capacity (MW)	ft	m	acre.ft	dam^{3}	Year	Owner	Primary purpose(s)
Alder Dam	Pierce/ Thurston	Nisqually River	Alder Lake	Arch	50.0	330	100	241,950	298,440	1945	Tacoma Power	Hydroelectric
Bonneville Dam†	Skamania	Columbia River	Lake Bonneville	Gravity	1,242.0	197	60	537,000	662,000	1937	U.S. Army Corps of Engineers	Hydroelectric, Navigation
Boundary Dam	Pend Oreille	Pend Oreille River	Boundary Lake	Arch-gravity	1,070.0	340	100	95,000	117,000	1967	Seattle City Light	Hydroelectric
Box Canyon Dam	Pend Oreille	Pend Oreille River	Box Canyon Reservoir	Gravity	90.0	62	19	60,000	74,000	1956	Pend Oreille Public Utility District	Hydroelectric
Chief Joseph Dam	Douglas/ Okanogan	Columbia River	Rock Island Pool	Gravity	2,620.0	135	41	516,000	636,000	1979	U.S. Army Corps of Engineers	Hydroelectric
Cle Elum Dam	Kittitas	Cle Elum River	Cle Elum Lake (Note: Natural lake raised by dam.)	Earthfill		165	50	436,900	538,900	1933	U.S. Bureau of Reclamation	Irrigation
Culmback Dam	Snohomish	Sultan River	Spada Lake	Rockfill	112.0	262	80	165,774	204,479	1965	City of Everett, Snohomish County PUD	Water supply
Cushman Dam No. 1	Mason	North Fork Skokomish River	Lake Cushman	Arch	43.2	235	72	453,400	559,300	1926	Tacoma Power	Hydroelectric
Cushman Dam No. 2	Mason	North Fork Skokomish River	Lake Kokanee	Arch	81.0	175	53	8,000	9,900	1930	Tacoma Power	Hydroelectric
Diablo Dam	Whatcom	Skagit River	Diablo Lake	Arch	129.0	389	119	88,500	109,200	1930	Seattle City Light	Hydroelectric
Dry Falls Dam (Note: Holds Banks Lake along with the smaller North Dam.)	Grant	Grand Coulee	Banks Lake	Earthfill		123	37	1,275,000	1,573,000	1949	U.S. Bureau of Reclamation	Irrigation
Gorge Dam	Whatcom	Skagit River	Gorge Lake	Gravity	199.2	300	91	9,700	12,000	1961	Seattle City Light	Hydroelectric
Grand Coulee Dam	Grant/ Okanogan	Columbia River	Franklin Delano Roosevelt Lake	Gravity	6,809.0	550	170	9,562,000	11,795,000	1942	U.S. Bureau of Reclamation	Irrigation, Hydroelectric, Flood control
Hiram M. Chittenden Locks and Dam	King	Lake Washington Ship Canal	Lake Washington (Note: Natural lake with its ocean outlet re-routed via the ship canal. The lock and dam structure maintains the lake level.)	Gravity	0	26	7.9	458,000	565,000	1916	U.S. Army Corps of Engineers	Navigation
Howard A. Hanson Dam	King	Green River	Howard A. Hanson Reservoir	Earthfill		235	72	136,700	168,600	1961	U.S. Army Corps of Engineers	Flood control, Water supply
John Day Dam†	Klickitat	Columbia River	Lake Umatilla	Gravity	2,160.0	184	56	2,530,000	3,120,000	1971	U.S. Army Corps of Engineers	Hydroelectric, Navigation
Ice Harbor Dam	Franklin/ Walla Walla	Snake River	Lake Sacajawea	Gravity	603.0	100	30	249,000	307,000	1962	U.S. Army Corps of Engineers	Hydroelectric, Navigation
Kachess Dam	Kittitas	Kachess River	Kachess Lake (Note: Natural lake raised by dam.)	Earthfill		112	34	239,000	295,000	1912	U.S. Bureau of Reclamation	Irrigation
Keechelus Dam	Kittitas	Yakima River	Keechelus Lake (Note: Natural lake raised by dam.)	Earthfill		128	39	157,900	194,800	1917	U.S. Bureau of Reclamation	Irrigation
LaGrande Dam	Pierce/ Thurston	Nisqually River	LaGrande Reservoir	Gravity	65.0	192	59	2,700	3,300	1945	Tacoma Power	Hydroelectric
Lake Chelan Dam	Chelan	Chelan River	Lake Chelan (Note: Natural lake raised by dam.)	Gravity	59.2	40	12	677,400	835,600	1927	Chelan County Public Utility District	Hydroelectric
Lake Tapps (Multiple dikes)	Pierce	Off-stream	Lake Tapps	Earthfill				48,258	59,525	1911	Cascade Water Alliance	Recreation, Water supply (proposed)
Little Goose Dam	Columbia/ Whitman	Snake River	Lake Bryan	Gravity	810.0	96	29	516,300	636,800	1970	U.S. Army Corps of Engineers	Hydroelectric, Navigation
Long Lake Dam	Lincoln/ Stevens	Spokane River	Long Lake	Gravity	71.0	213	65	105,000	130,000	1915	Avista	Hydroelectric
Lower Baker Dam	Skagit	Baker River	Lake Shannon	Arch	79.0	285	87	161,470	199,170	1925	Puget Sound Energy	Hydroelectric
Lower Granite Dam	Garfield/ Whitman	Snake River	Lower Granite Lake	Gravity	810.0	100	30	440,200	543,000	1975	U.S. Army Corps of Engineers	Hydroelectric, Navigation
Lower Monumental Dam	Franklin/ Walla Walla	Snake River	Lake Herbert G. West	Gravity	810.0	100	30	432,000	533,000	1969	U.S. Army Corps of Engineers	Hydroelectric, Navigation
Masonry Dam	King	Cedar River	Chester Morse Lake/ Masonry Pool (Note: Chester Morse Lake is a natural lake enlarged by the Chester Morse Dam in 1900. When Masonry Dam was constructed in 1915 it submerged the old dam and created a new body of water, just downstream and connected to Chester Morse Lake, called Masonry Pool.)	Arch-gravity	30.0	215	66	93,900	115,800	1915	Seattle Public Utilities	Water supply, Hydroelectric
Mayfield Dam	Lewis	Cowlitz River	Lake Mayfield	Arch-gravity	162.0	250	76	133,764	164,995	1963	Tacoma Power	Hydroelectric
McNary Dam†	Benton	Columbia River	Lake Wallula	Gravity	986.0	183	56	1,350,000	1,670,000	1954	U.S. Army Corps of Engineers	Hydroelectric, Navigation
Merwin Dam	Clark/ Cowlitz	Lewis River	Lake Merwin	Arch-gravity	136.0	313	95	422,000	521,000	1931	PacifiCorp	Hydroelectric
Mossyrock Dam	Lewis	Cowlitz River	Riffe Lake	Arch	300.0	606	185	1,685,000	2,078,000	1968	Tacoma Power	Hydroelectric
Mud Mountain Dam	King	White River	Mud Mountain Lake	Earth/rockfill	0	432	132	106,000	131,000	1948	U.S. Army Corps of Engineers	Flood control
Pinto Dam	Grant	Off-stream	Billy Clapp Lake	Earthfill		130	40	21,200	26,100	1948	U.S. Bureau of Reclamation	Irrigation
Priest Rapids Dam	Grant/ Yakima	Columbia River	Priest Rapids Lake	Gravity/ Embankment	955.6	178	54	237,100	292,500	1961	Grant County Public Utility District	Hydroelectric
Rock Island Dam	Chelan/ Douglas	Columbia River	Rock Island Pool	Gravity	623.7	135	41	131,000	162,000	1933	Chelan County Public Utility District	Hydroelectric
Rocky Reach Dam	Chelan/ Douglas	Columbia River	Lake Entiat	Gravity	1,299.6	130	40	382,000	471,000	1969	Chelan County Public Utility District	Hydroelectric
Ross Dam	Whatcom	Skagit River	Ross Lake	Arch	460.0	540	160	1,435,000	1,770,000	1949	Seattle City Light	Hydroelectric
Roza Dam	Kittitas	Yakima River	Yakima River	Gravity		67	20			1939	United States Bureau of Reclamation	Irrigation
Skookumchuck Dam	Thurston	Skookumchuck River	Skookumchuck Reservoir	Earthfill	1.0	190	58	34,800	42,900	1970	TransAlta	Water supply
South Fork Tolt River Dam	King	South Fork Tolt River	South Fork Tolt Reservoir	Earthfill	6.55	200	61	57,900	71,400	1964	Seattle Public Utilities	Water supply
Swift Dam	Skamania	Lewis River	Swift Reservoir	Earthfill	240.0	512	156	755,600	932,000	1958	PacifiCorp	Hydroelectric
The Dalles Dam†	Klickitat	Columbia River	Lake Celilo	Gravity	1,878.3	200	61	330,000	410,000	1957	U.S. Army Corps of Engineers	Hydroelectric, navigation
Tieton Dam	Yakima	Tieton River	Rimrock Lake	Earthfill	15.6	319	97	203,600	251,100	1925	U.S. Bureau of Reclamation	Irrigation
Toutle River Sediment Retention Structure	Cowlitz	North Fork Toutle River	(Note: The Sediment Retention Structure was constructed to trap debris flow sediment after the 1980 eruption of Mount St. Helens. The basin behind the dam is almost entirely filled with silt.)	Earthfill	0	184	56	160,000	200,000	1989	U.S. Army Corps of Engineers	Sediment control
Upper Baker Dam	Whatcom	Baker River	Baker Lake	Arch	91.0	312	95	285,000	352,000	1959	Puget Sound Energy	Hydroelectric
Wanapum Dam	Grant/ Kittitas	Columbia River	Lake Wanapum	Gravity/ Embankment	1,040.0	185	56	796,000	982,000	1963	Grant County Public Utility District	Hydroelectric
Wells Dam	Chelan/ Douglas	Columbia River	Lake Pateros	Gravity	851.4	160	49	331,200	408,500	1967	Douglas County Public Utility District	Hydroelectric
Wynoochee Dam	Grays Harbor	Wynoochee River	Wynoochee Lake	Gravity	10.8	175	53	69,405	85,610	1972	City of Aberdeen	Water supply
Yale Dam	Clark/ Cowlitz	Lewis River	Yale Lake	Earthfill	134.0	323	98	402,000	496,000	1953	PacifiCorp	Hydroelectric

== Removed dams ==
- Condit Dam, on the White Salmon River in Klickitat County
- Elwha Dam and Glines Canyon Dam, on the Elwha River in Clallam County

== See also ==
- List of dams in the Columbia River watershed
- List of hydroelectric power stations in Washington
