= Reliance, Washington =

Unincorporated town

- Unincorporated community
- Location within Washington (state)
- Coordinates: 46°46′21″N 122°15′57″W
- Country: United States
- State: Washington
- County: Pierce
- Established: August 28, 1913
- Elevation: 4,026 ft (1,227 m)
- Time zone: UTC-8 (Pacific (PST))
  - Summer (DST): UTC-7 (PDT)

Reliance is an unincorporated community in Pierce County, Washington. It is located off Route 7, on the shore of Alder Lake.

== History ==
The town had a history of logging, the town was built up by the Reliance Lumber Company and later it was the headquarters of the Cascade Timber Company in 1927. When Alder Dam was built the valley that the town was in was inundated, forcing the residents to create a new town on the shore, this is the modern day Reliance. Another town called New Reliance was built a half a mile north of Alder.

A post office operated from August 28, 1913 to September 30, 1914.

== Infrastructure ==
The town is connected to Route 7 via Lillie Dale Road. The town sits on Alder Lake, where many docks reside on the shore.

There is also a fire station nearby.

== Politics ==
The town is a part of precinct 02158, in which for the 2020 presidential election, 581 votes were cast for Joe Biden, 497 votes for Donald Trump, 38 votes for Jo Jorgensen, 5 votes for Howie Hawkins, 3 votes for other third parties and 6 write-ins.
