= Carpenter Island =

Man-made island on the Columbia River

Coordinates: 47°56′43″N 119°52′02″W

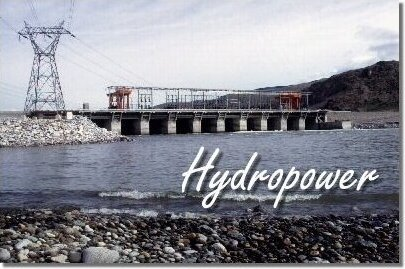
Wells Dam taken from Carpenter Island Boat Launch area

Carpenter Island is a man-made island and boat launch area on the Columbia River in Washington, US. It has the shape of a backward letter L and lies on the Chelan County side of the river, across from Douglas County and is just downstream of Wells Dam.

Carpenter Island is also known as Carpenter Island Boat Launch. It has a fish hatchery channel which is part of the Wells Dam and Hatchery. It is owned and operated by Douglas County Public Utility District.
