= Ashford Mansion =

Historic house in Washington, United States

Coordinates: 46.7597°N 122.0269°W

- Ashford House
- U.S. National Register of Historic Places
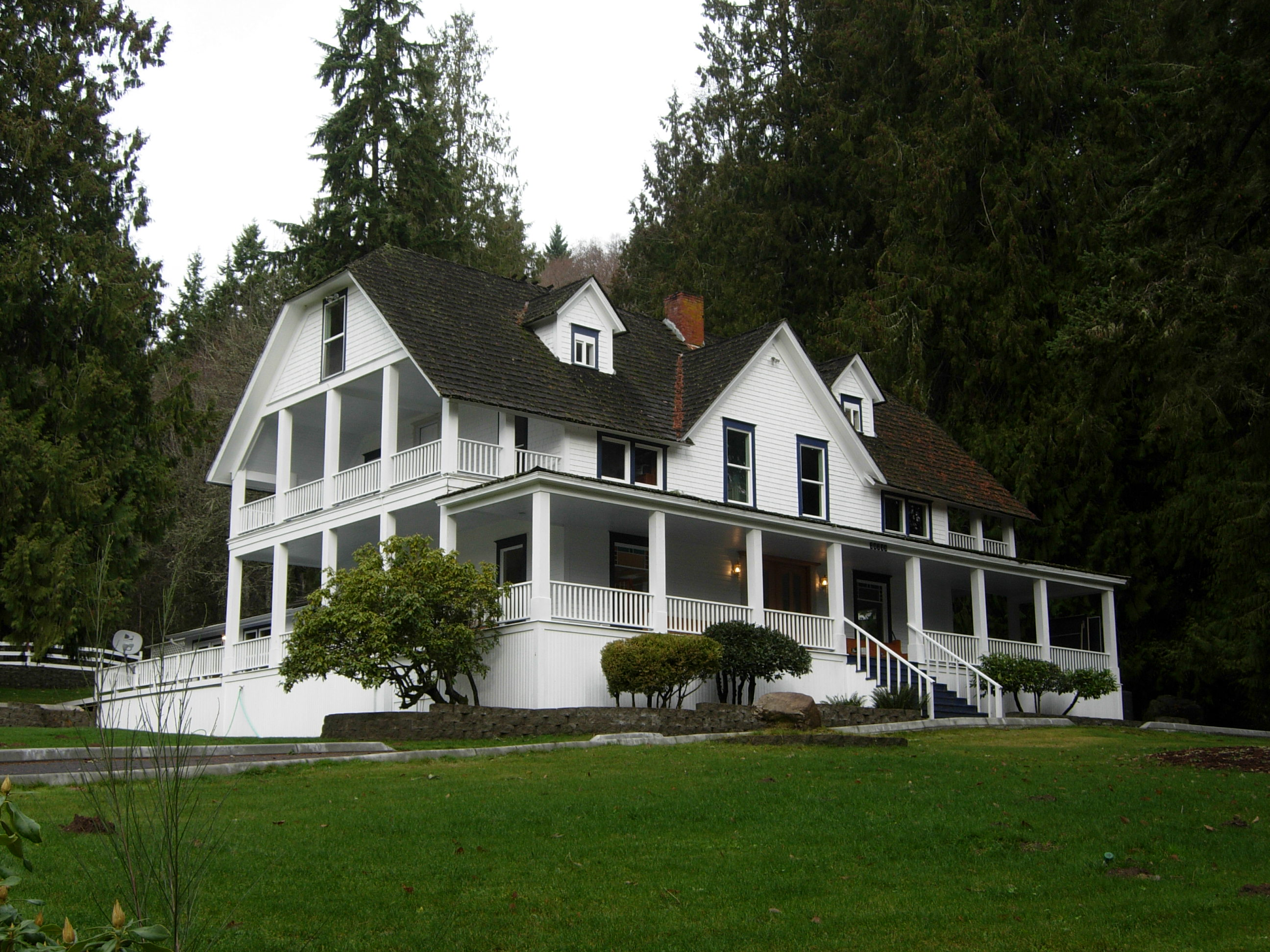
- The Ashford Mansion December 5, 2007
- Location: Mount Tahoma Canyon Road, Ashford, Washington
- Area: Architecture
- Built: 1903
- Architect: Cora Ashford
- Architectural style: Colonial Revival
- NRHP reference No.: 84003560
- Added to NRHP: 1984

The Ashford Mansion, also known as the Ashford House, is a turn of the 20th century residence located in Ashford, Washington. The house was built in 1903, in the Colonial Revival style by Cora Ashford, for whom the town of Ashford is also named. The building was constructed of solid grain Douglas Fir, with a porch enclosing three sides of the main floor and a covered veranda on each end of the second floor. The mansion is located in south Pierce County, seven miles from the Nisqually River Entrance to Mount Rainier National Park. From the time of its construction until 1967 the mansion stayed in the Ashford family. After its sale the mansion served at different times as a private residence, an English-style bed and breakfast, and is currently rent-able for various functions.

== See also ==
- List of Registered Historic Places in Washington
- List of Registered Historic Places in Pierce County, Washington
