= Ashford, Washington =

- CDP
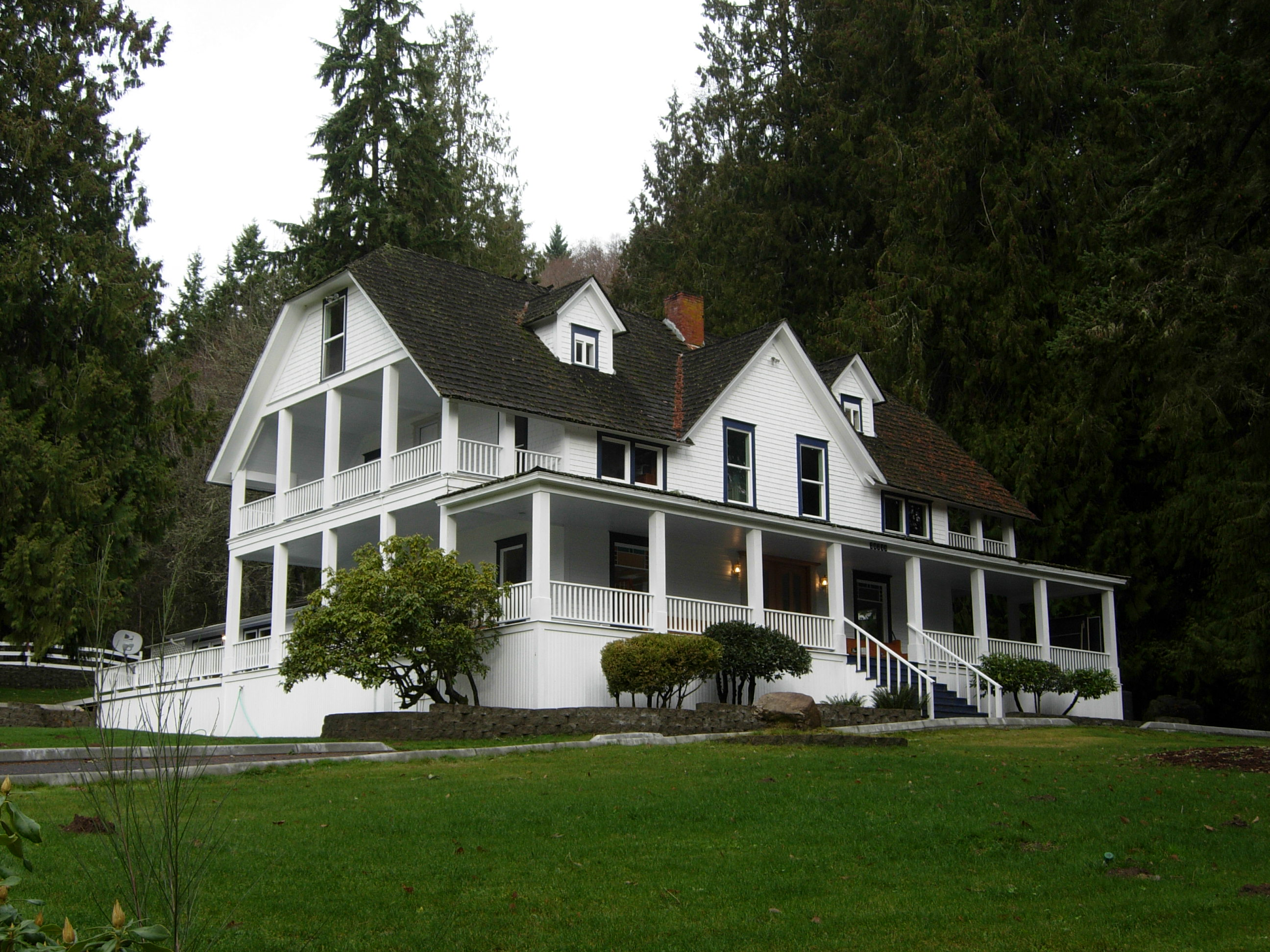
- Ashford Mansion

- Location of Ashford, Washington
- Coordinates: 46°45′08″N 122°00′44″W
- Country: United States
- State: Washington
- County: Pierce

Area
  - Total: 2.1 sq mi (5.4 km^{2})
  - Land: 2.1 sq mi (5.4 km^{2})
  - Water: 0 sq mi (0.0 km^{2})
- Elevation: 1,745 ft (532 m)

Population (2020)
  - Total: 303
  - Density: 150/sq mi (56/km^{2})
- Time zone: UTC-8 (Pacific (PST))
  - Summer (DST): UTC-7 (PDT)
- ZIP Code: 98304
- Area code(s): 360, 564
- FIPS code: 53-03005
- GNIS feature ID: 2407772

Ashford is a census-designated place (CDP) mostly within Pierce County, Washington, United States. Its population was 303 as of the 2020 census. The town is west of the main (Nisqually River) entrance to Mount Rainier National Park. Surrounding mountains and the narrow Nisqually River valley are heavily forested. Some of Ashford is across the Nisqually River in Lewis County.

== History ==
Ashford was named for Walter A. Ashford, who homesteaded there in 1888. The area was first settled by the Upper Nisqually nation, a Salish tribe. The Ashford Mansion, built 1903, is now an NRHP-listed building.

== Geography ==
Ashford is located in southeastern Pierce County in the Cascade Range. It is on the north side of the Nisqually River and is bisected by State Route 706, the main access road to Paradise in Mount Rainier National Park.

According to the United States Census Bureau, the CDP has a total area of 2.1 square miles (5.4 km^{2}), all of it land.

=== Climate ===
This region experiences warm (but not hot) and dry summers, with no average monthly temperatures above 71.6 °F. According to the Köppen Climate Classification system, Ashford has a warm-summer Mediterranean climate, abbreviated "Csb" on climate maps.

== Demographics ==
Historical population
Census	Pop.	Note	%±
2000	267		—
2010	217		−18.7%
2020	303		39.6%
U.S. Decennial Census; 1990 2000 2010

Ashford first appeared as a census designated place in the 2000 U.S. census.

=== Racial and ethnic composition ===
Ashford CDP, Washington – Racial and ethnic composition Note: the US Census treats Hispanic/Latino as an ethnic category. This table excludes Latinos from the racial categories and assigns them to a separate category. Hispanics/Latinos may be of any race.
Race / Ethnicity (NH = Non-Hispanic)	Pop 2000	Pop 2010	Pop 2020	% 2000	% 2010	% 2020
White alone (NH)	250	195	261	93.63%	89.86%	86.14%
Black or African American alone (NH)	1	0	3	0.37%	0.00%	0.99%
Native American or Alaska Native alone (NH)	2	2	1	0.75%	0.92%	0.33%
Asian alone (NH)	2	13	1	0.75%	5.99%	0.33%
Native Hawaiian or Pacific Islander alone (NH)	0	0	0	0.00%	0.00%	0.00%
Other race alone (NH)	5	0	3	1.87%	0.00%	0.99%
Mixed race or Multiracial (NH)	7	5	25	2.62%	2.30%	8.25%
Hispanic or Latino (any race)	0	2	9	0.00%	0.92%	2.97%
Total	267	217	303	100.00%	100.00%	100.00%

=== 2000 census ===
As of the census of 2000, there were 267 people, 122 households, and 56 families residing in the CDP. The population density was 128.3 people per square mile (49.6/km^{2}). There were 193 housing units at an average density of 92.7/sq mi (35.8/km^{2}). The racial makeup of the CDP was 93.63% White, 0.37% African American, 0.75% Native American, 0.75% Asian, 1.87% from other races, and 2.62% from two or more races.

There were 122 households, out of which 27.0% had children under the age of 18 living with them, 37.7% were married couples living together, 7.4% had a female householder with no husband present, and 53.3% were non-families. 38.5% of all households were made up of individuals, and 8.2% had someone living alone who was 65 years of age or older. The average household size was 2.19 and the average family size was 3.09.

In the CDP, the population was spread out, with 23.2% under the age of 18, 6.0% from 18 to 24, 31.1% from 25 to 44, 28.1% from 45 to 64, and 11.6% who were 65 years of age or older. The median age was 41 years. For every 100 females, there were 124.4 males. For every 100 females age 18 and over, there were 107.1 males.

The median income for a household in the CDP was $27,917, and the median income for a family was $25,500. Males had a median income of $46,406 versus $26,250 for females. The per capita income for the CDP was $19,996. About 21.7% of families and 20.5% of the population were below the poverty line, including none of those under the age of eighteen or sixty five or over.
