= Alder Lake (Washington) =

Reservoir in Washington, US

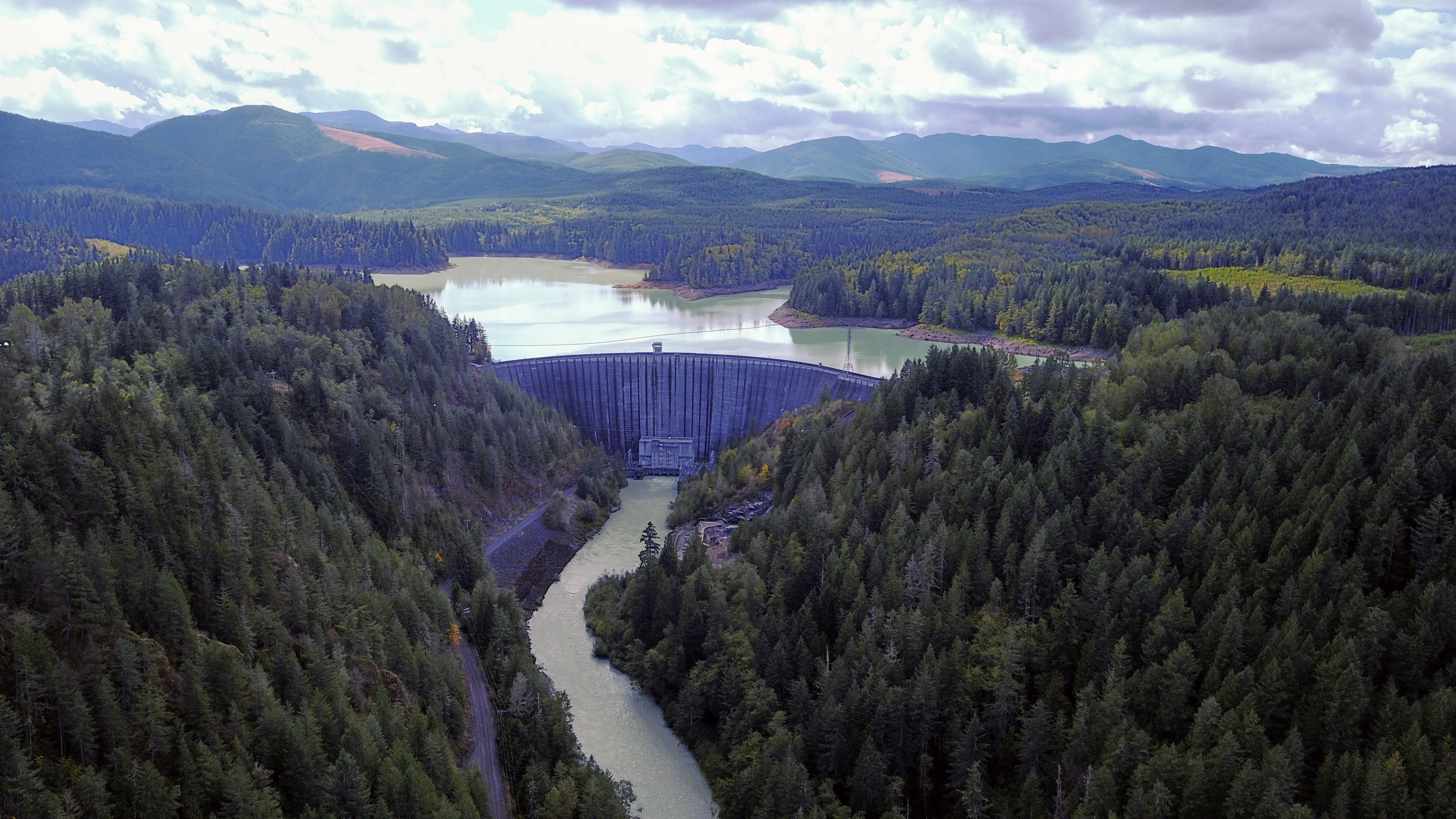
- Alder Lake behind Alder Dam

- Location within Washington (state) Location within the United States
- Location: Pierce County, Thurston County, Lewis County, Washington, United States
- Coordinates: 46°46′15″N 122°16′20″W
- Type: reservoir
- Primary inflows: Nisqually River
- Primary outflows: Nisqually River
- Catchment area: 286 mi^{2} (740 km^{2})
- Basin countries: United States
- Max. length: 7 mi (11 km)
- Surface area: 3,065 acres (1,240 ha)
- Shore length^{1}: 28 mi (45 km)
- Surface elevation: 1,207 ft (368 m) at full pool
- Islands: 5
- Settlements: Elbe
- References: GNIS: 1515791
- ^{1} Shore length is not a well-defined measure.

Alder Lake is a 7 mi (11 km) long reservoir on the Nisqually River about ten miles south of Eatonville, Washington, It was created by the construction of Alder Dam by Tacoma Power in September 1944. At the very eastern end of the lake is the town of Elbe, Washington.

The name of the lake recalls the former small town of Alder, which was flooded in 1945 by the impounded water of the lake and disappeared. The extinct town, in turn, was named for alder trees near the original site. The current community of Alder is located north of the lake.

In 2021, Intel gave its 12th generation Intel Core processor the codename Alder Lake after the body of water.

== See also ==
- List of geographic features in Lewis County, Washington
- List of geographic features in Thurston County, Washington
- List of lakes in Washington
