= Alder Dam =

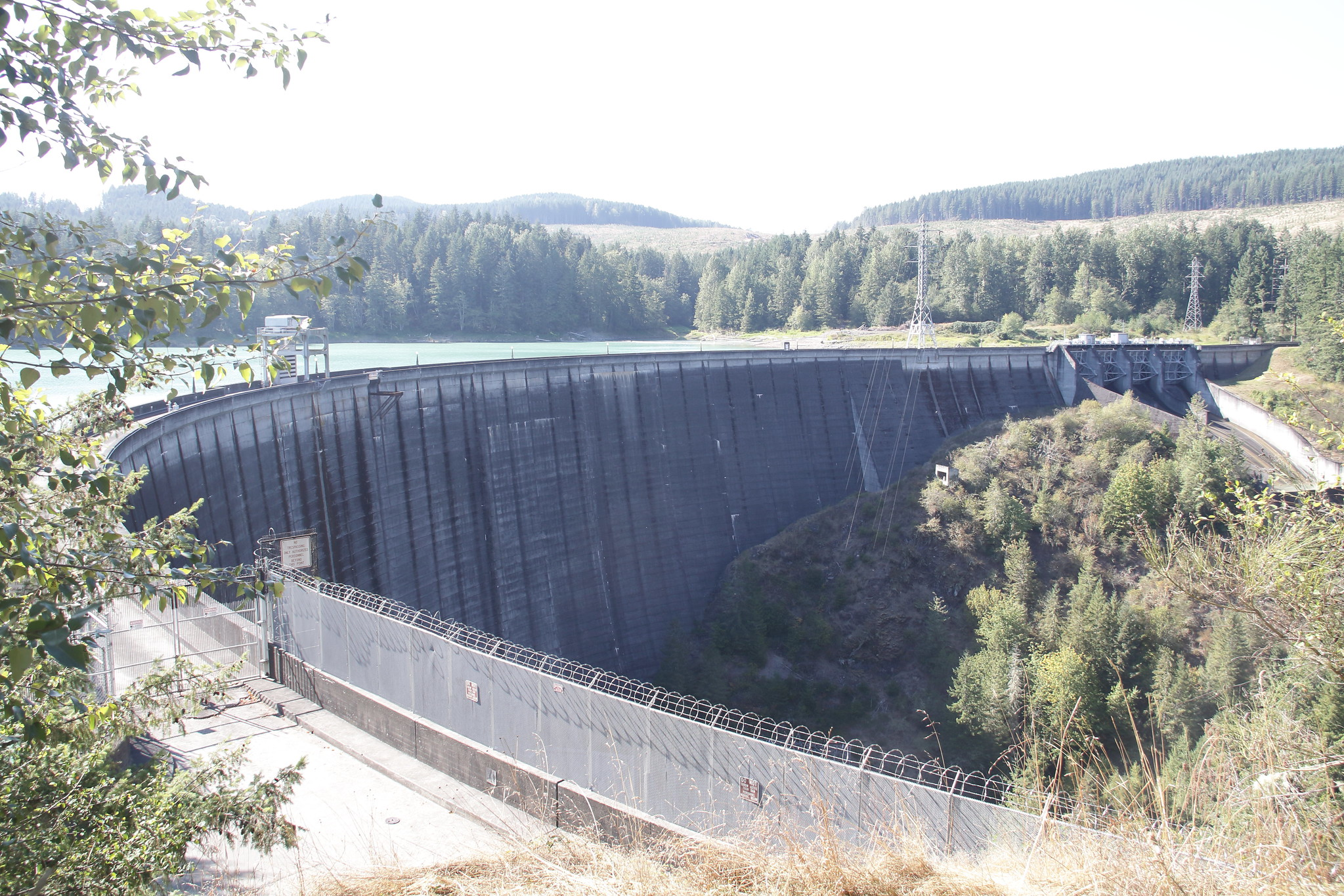
- A front view of the Alder Dam.
- Interactive map of Alder Dam
- Location: Pierce / Thurston counties, Washington
- Coordinates: 46.8015°N 122.3104°W
- Construction began: 1942
- Opening date: 1945

Dam and spillways
- Impounds: Nisqually River
- Height: 330 ft (100 m)
- Length: 1,600 ft (490 m)
- Width (base): 120 ft (37 m)

Reservoir
- Creates: Alder Lake
- Total capacity: 241,950 acre⋅ft (298,440,000 m^{3})
- Catchment area: 286 sq mi (740 km^{2})
- Surface area: 3,065 acres (12.40 km^{2})

Power Station
- Turbines: 2 x 25 MW
- Installed capacity: 50 MW
- Annual generation: 197,830,000 KWh

Alder Dam is a concrete thick arch dam on the Nisqually River in the U.S. state of Washington. The construction began in 1942 and was completed in 1945. At this time Alder Dam was among the tallest dams in the United States, although this title has since been surpassed. The impounded water behind the dam forms Alder Lake, stretching about 7 miles (11 km) upstream with a capacity of 241,950 acre-feet (0.29844 km^{3}). With 28 miles (45 km) of shoreline, the lake is a popular recreation spot close to Mount Rainier National Park.

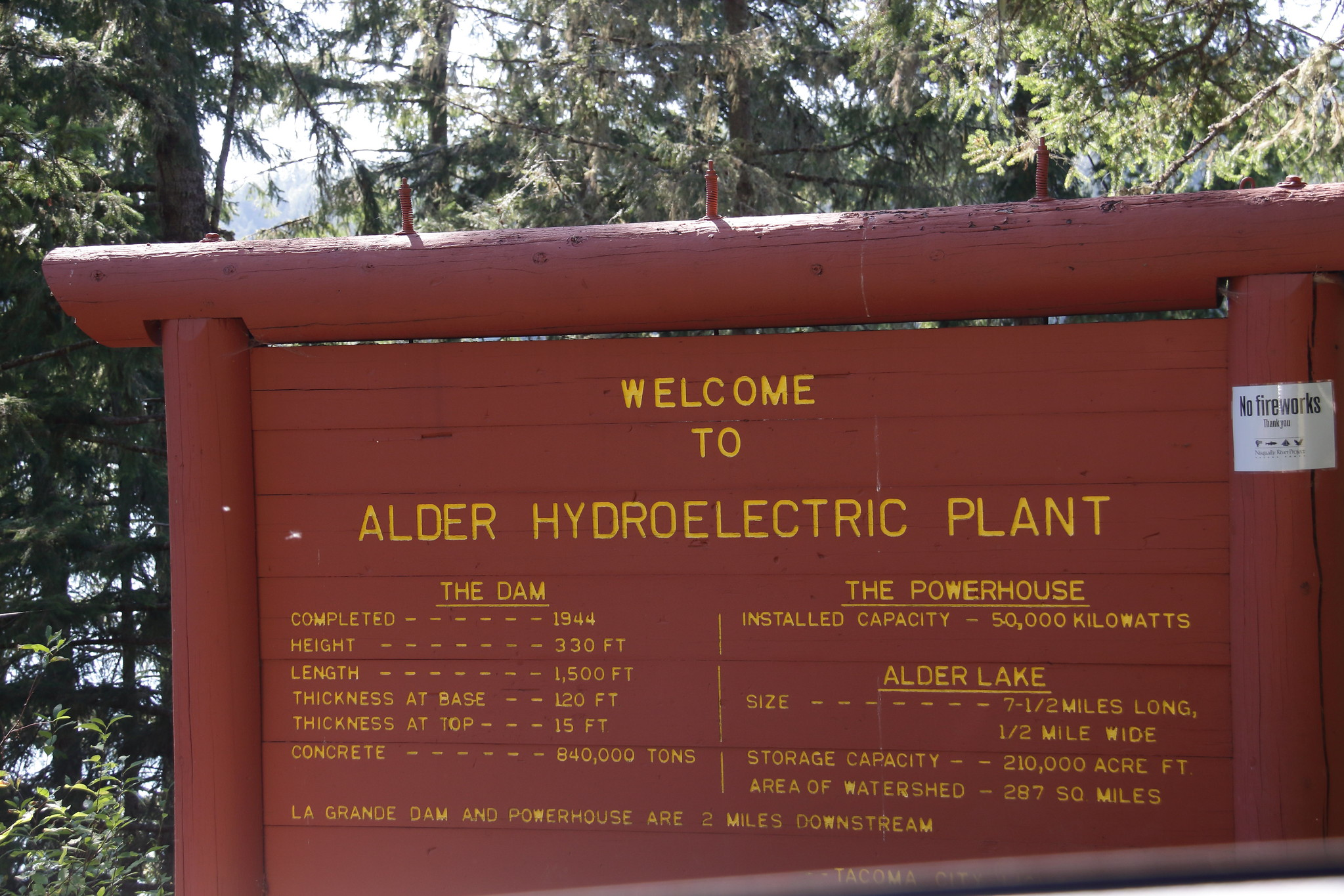
Dam/Powerplant Statistics

Water from Alder Lake is sent into two generators at the base of the dam, each of which produces 25 megawatts for a total nameplate capacity of 50 megawatts. Two miles downstream is LaGrande Dam, site of the first dam in the area, dating from 1912, and rebuilt in 1945 along with Alder's construction. Most of the energy produced at the dam is sent to the city of Tacoma, about 25 miles (40 km) north. Both Alder and LaGrande dams are owned and operated by Tacoma Power.

The name of the lake and the dam recalls the former small town of Alder, which was flooded in 1945 by the impounded water of the lake and disappeared. The current community of Alder is located north of the reservoir.
