= Click! Network =

American broadband cable system

Click! Network is an open access broadband cable system owned by Tacoma Power, a part of Tacoma Public Utilities in Tacoma, Washington. It provides cable television and Internet connectivity for residents and businesses in Tacoma, University Place, Fircrest, Lakewood and Fife.

== History ==
Back in the late 1990s there was talk of deregulation of the power industry, much like the banking and airlines industries flourished shortly after their deregulations. Utility companies are traditionally a very conservative business with relatively little change or innovation since the beginning of the century. Tacoma Power's management team had the foresight to look into the future and predict some of the results that would come from deregulation of power companies. Deregulation would mean that power companies would no longer have their protected monopolies and they would be forced into more of a delivery business since they would still own the wires. To strengthen Tacoma Power's position in this type of a business environment Steven Klein, then Superintendent, suggested that they invest in an innovation in their power delivery system, i.e. the "SmartMeter".

When Tacoma Power started drawing up plans to develop a 100 million dollar fiber-optic network to link its power substations, and saw potential value for its customers at little additional cost to the utility to expanding the network to offer cable television, high-speed Internet and high-speed data services to the community. After originally approaching TCI Cable to be the cable television service provider and being turned down, Tacoma Power decided to create their own cable company. These services compete with the existing Comcast service providers in the area. Commercial high-speed data services began in 1997, cable TV in 1998, and high-speed Internet services over cable modem in 1999. Click! is one of the largest municipal telecommunications systems in the United States.

In 2000, the State of Washington passed RCW 54.16.330, effectively preventing further research and development of Click! Network until its repeal in 2021 during the COVID-19 pandemic, a period of over 20 years.

In 2020, Click! Network was sold by the Tacoma Public Utilities to Rainier Connect. The utilities would continue to own the lines, but Rainier Connect would run all operations and provide maintenance. The contract was for 20 years with two extensions. The transfer of day to day operations was highly controversial amongst the Tacoma population, but was ultimately supported due to the restrictions imposed by the State of Washington nearly 20 years prior. Controversies arose again after the state level restrictions were repealed in 2021.

After six months, Rainier Connect started migrating legacy set top box TV customers to an IPTV system. This move was also controversial among the Tacoma population, much of whom had limited technical skills and would have significant trouble adapting to an IPTV system.

Click! Network remains a highly political topic within local politics in the City of Tacoma because of its implications for the city, region, state of Washington, and implementation specifics of the federal Build Back Better Plan.
