= Tacoma Public Utilities =

Agency overview
- Formed: 1893
- Type: public utilities
- Headquarters: 3628 S 35th St; Tacoma, Washington 98409
- Employees: 1,777 (2018)
- Annual budget: $1.2 billion (2015–2016)
- Agency executive: Jackie Flowers, Director of Utilities/CEO
- Website: mytpu.org

Tacoma Public Utilities is the public utility service for the city of Tacoma, Washington. It was formed in 1893 when the citizens of Tacoma voted to buy the privately owned Tacoma Light & Water Company. It is the largest department in Tacoma City government, with a 2015–2016 budget of $1.2 billion and 1,378 employees. Operations are funded entirely by revenue generated from sale of services, not from taxes.

== Operating divisions ==
There are three operating divisions of Tacoma Public Utilities.

- Tacoma Power – Provides electric service to 175,870 customers over 180 square miles of service area and operates seven hydroelectric dams.
  - Click! Network – Provides high-speed internet service to 23,352 customers and cable television service to 17,468 customers. Operated by Tacoma Power.
- Tacoma Water – Provides water service to 99,985 customers over 117 square miles of service area. The Green River is the primary source of water.
- Tacoma Rail – Provides railroad freight switching services, serving the Port of Tacoma and customers in region. It is one of the largest shortline railroad systems in the United States.
