= Yelm Creek =

Creek in Thurston County, Washington state

- Interactive map of Creek location

Location
- Country: United States
- State: Washington
- County: Thurston County

Physical characteristics
- Mouth
  - coordinates: 46°58′14″N 122°37′37″W

Basin features
- River system: Nisqually River
- Geographic Names Information System: 1509661

Yelm Creek is a stream in Thurston County in the U.S. state of Washington. It is a tributary to the Nisqually River.

A Nisqually Indian settlement once stood at its mouth.

== See also ==
- List of geographic features in Thurston County, Washington
