= Gorge Lake =

Man-made reservoir in Washington (state)

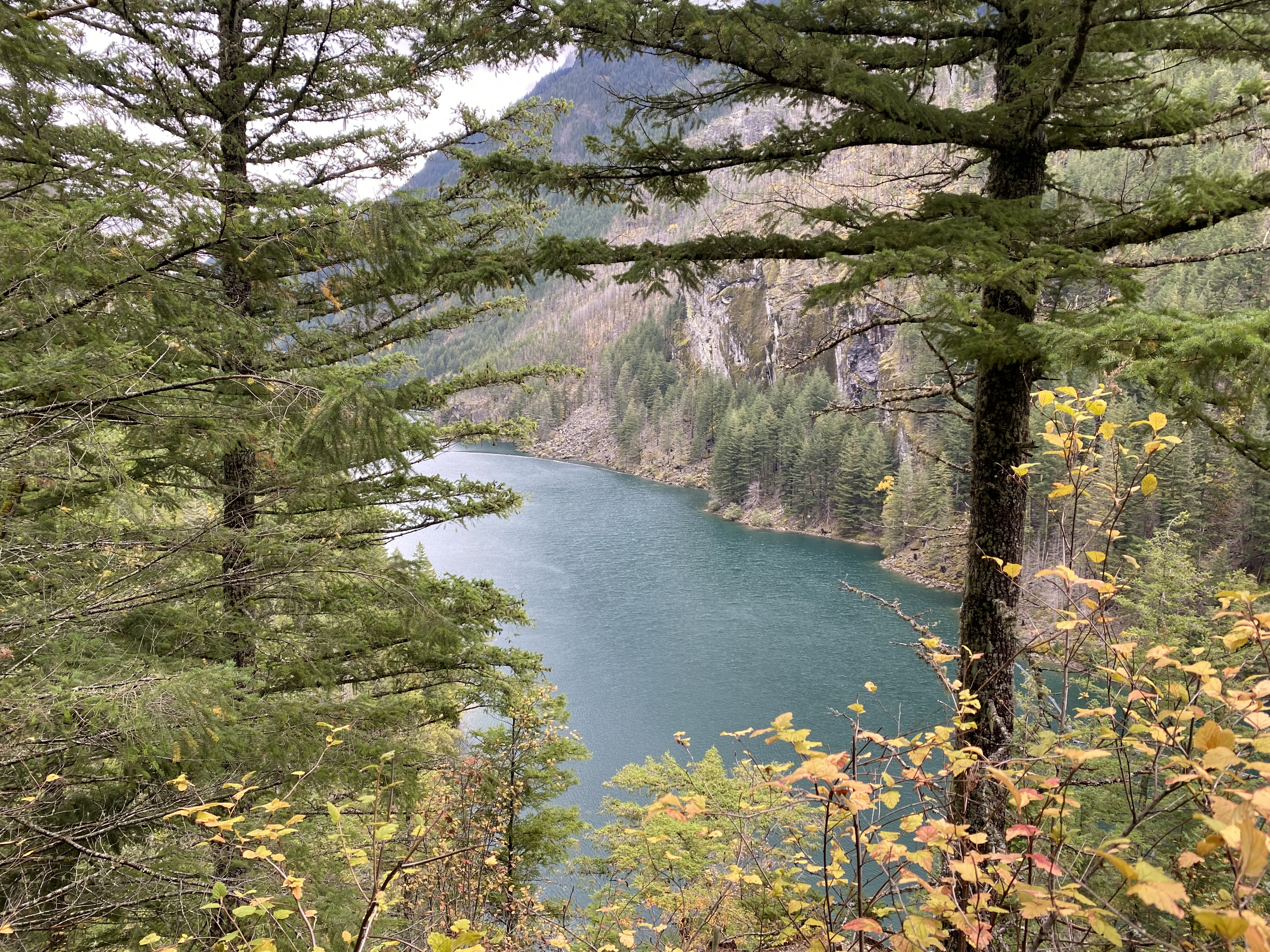
- View of Gorge Lake from Gorge Overlook Trail

- Location within Washington (state)
- Interactive map of Gorge Lake
- Location: Ross Lake National Recreation Area, Whatcom County, Washington, United States
- Coordinates: 48°42′0″N 121°11′24″W
- Lake type: Reservoir
- Primary inflows: Skagit River; Gorge Creek
- Primary outflows: Skagit River
- Max. length: 4.5 miles (7.2 km)
- Surface area: 220.40 acres (89.19 ha)
- Water volume: 5,000 acre-feet (6.2 hm^{3})
- Surface elevation: 876 feet (267 m)

Gorge Lake is a reservoir in the North Cascades of northwestern Washington state, United States. Created by Gorge Dam, the lake is located between Diablo Lake and Newhalem on the Skagit River, at an elevation of 876 feet (267 m) above sea level.

Gorge Lake is part of the Ross Lake National Recreation Area, which itself is part of the North Cascades National Park Complex.

== History ==
The lake was originally flooded when construction on the first Gorge Dam began in 1921. In 1961, a new Gorge Dam, made of concrete, was completed to replace the original, raising the water level in the lake to where it is today.

== Recreation ==
According to the Washington Department of Fish and Wildlife, Gorge Lake is open all year for fishing, and anglers can expect to catch rainbow trout and bull trout. Two pole fishing is not allowed.

Kayaking, canoeing, and motor boating are popular activities on Gorge Lake, and there are ramps and launches available. The National Park Service warns parkgoers that the water temperature within the park complex rarely reach above 50 °F (10 °C), and that falling in may be fatal within minutes.

== See also ==
- Gorge Dam
- Diablo Lake
- Ross Lake
- Skagit River Hydroelectric Project
