= LaGrande Dam =

Hydroelectric dam in Washington, U.S.

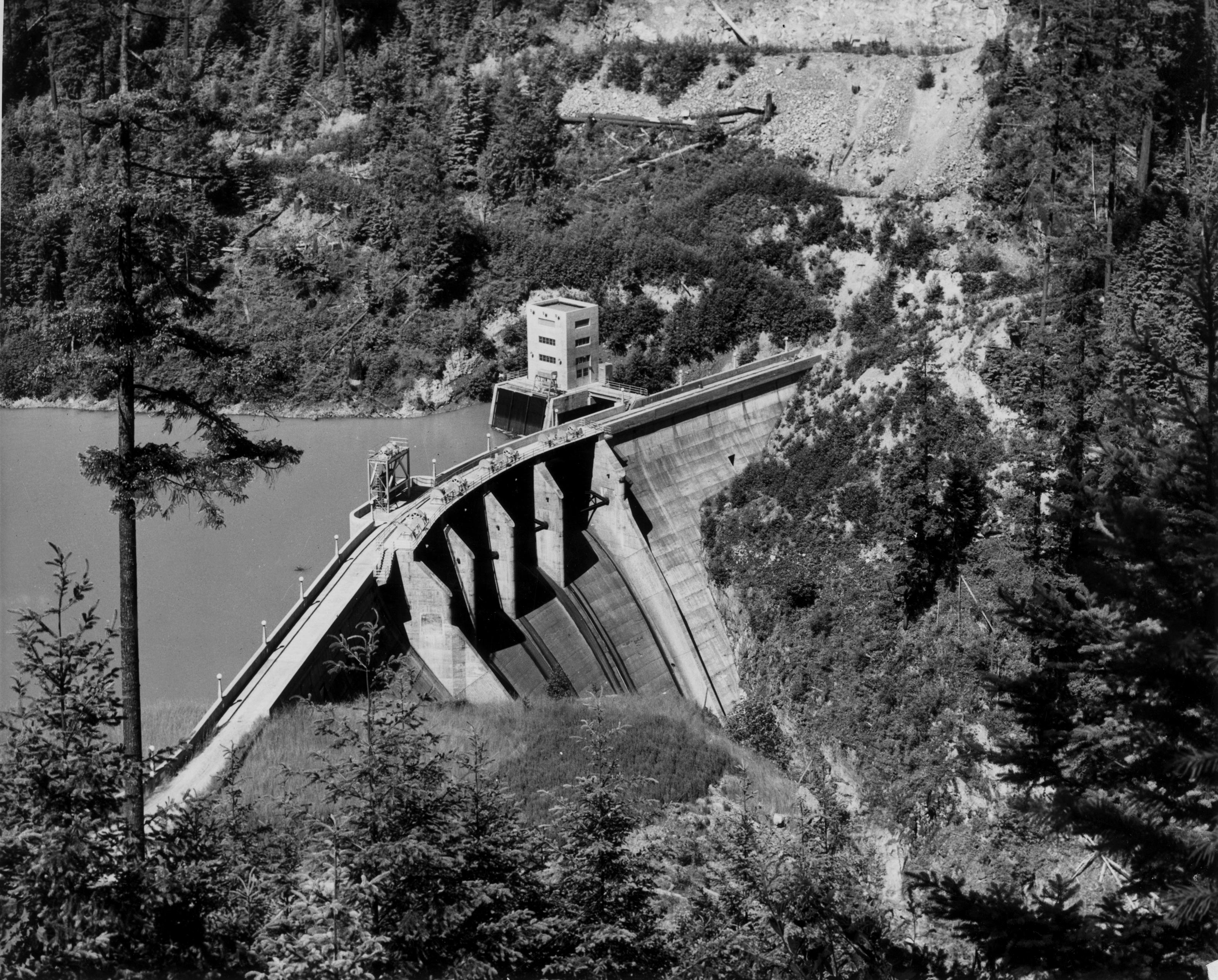
- Interactive map of LaGrande Dam
- Location: Pierce County \ Thurston County
- Coordinates: 46°49′22″N 122°18′15″W
- Status: Operational
- Opening date: 1945
- Construction cost: $9.7 Million
- Owner: Tacoma Power

Dam and spillways
- Impounds: Nisqually River
- Height (foundation): 217
- Height (thalweg): 192
- Length: 710
- Width (crest): 12
- Width (base): 85

Reservoir
- Creates: LaGrande Reservoir

LaGrande Powerhouse
- Commission date: 1912
- Turbines: 4x 6 MW, 1x 40 MW
- Installed capacity: 64 MW
- Annual generation: 297.313 GWh
- Website https://www.mytpu.org/about-tpu/services/power/about-tacoma-power/dams-power-sources/nisqually-river-project/lagrande-dam/

LaGrande Dam (or La Grande Dam) is a hydroelectric dam on the Nisqually River, on the border of Pierce County and Thurston County, Washington. LaGrande is the lesser of two coordinated dams on the Nisqually, situated two miles north (downstream) of the other, Alder Dam. Both are owned by Tacoma Power.

Hydroelectric power was first produced from LaGrande in November 1912 as the first independent project of Tacoma Power. The present structure was completed in 1945, the same year as Alder Dam's construction. At 192 feet high, the dam impounds about 2,700 acre-feet (3,300,000 m^{3}) of water.

Neither LaGrande Dam nor its narrow two-mile-long impoundment, LaGrande Reservoir, is accessible to the public.

== Hydroelectric power capacity ==
Generator	Nameplate Capacity (MW)
1	6.0
2	6.0
3	6.0
4	6.0
5	40.0
Total	64.0
