= Wells Dam =

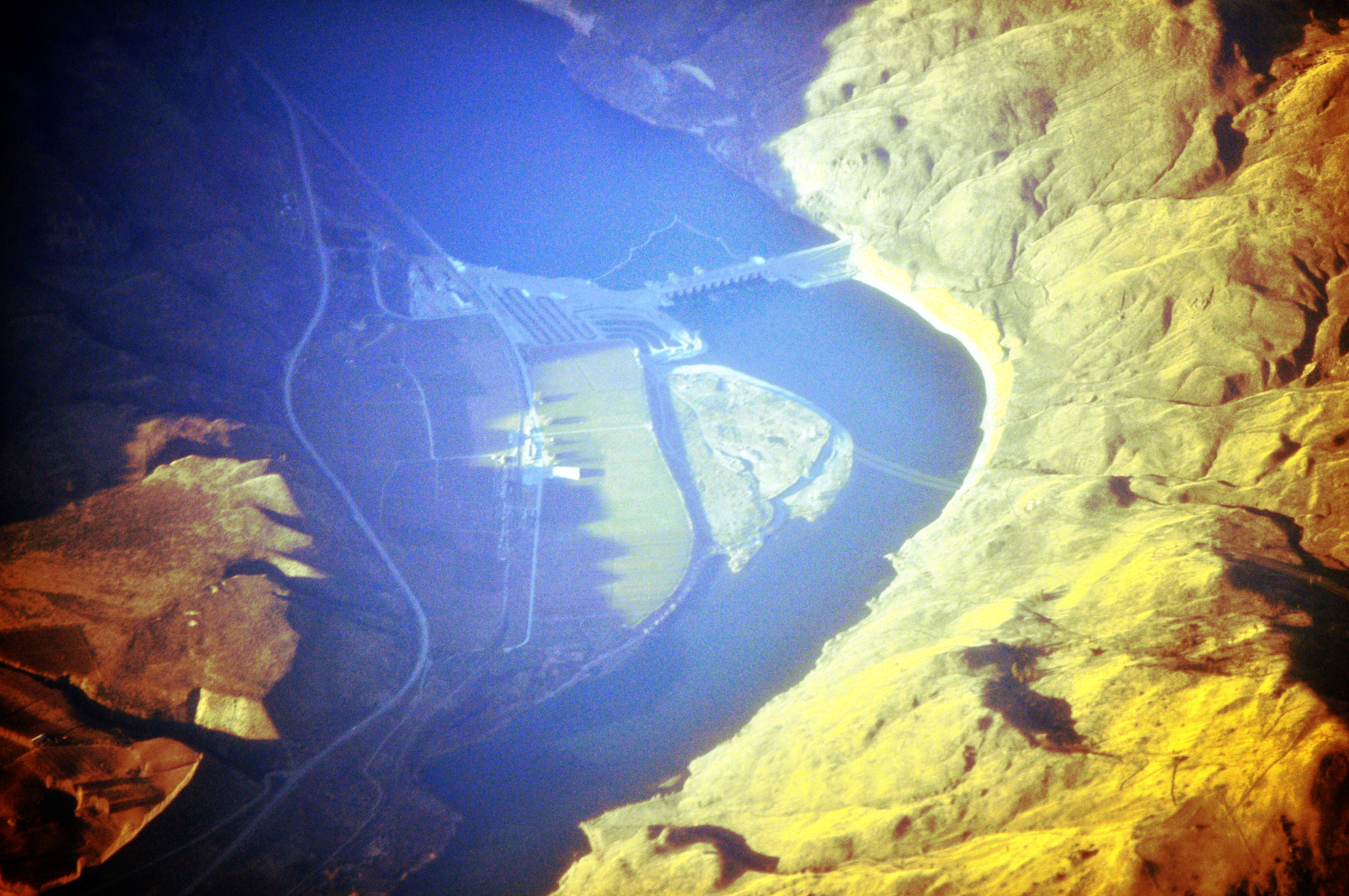
- Interactive map of Wells Dam
- Official name: Wells Hydroelectric Project
- Location: Chelan / Douglas counties, Washington
- Coordinates: 47°56′43.44″N 119°51′57.6″W
- Construction began: July 12, 1962
- Opening date: August 22, 1967
- Operator: Douglas County Public Utility District

Dam and spillways
- Impounds: Columbia River
- Height (foundation): 186 feet (57 m)
- Length: 4,460 feet (1,360 m)
- Width (crest): 169 feet (52 m)
- Spillways: 11

Reservoir
- Creates: Lake Pateros
- Total capacity: 331,200 acre⋅ft (0.4085 km^{3})

Power Station
- Turbines: 10 Total MW; 7x 89.0 MW; 3x 77.4 MW
- Installed capacity: 855.2 MW
- Annual generation: 3,502.38 GWh

Wells Dam is a hydroelectric embankment dam located on the Columbia River, downstream from the confluence of the Okanogan River, Methow River, and the Columbia River in Washington state. The dam, associated structures, and machinery make up the Wells Hydroelectric Project. It is owned and operated by Douglas County Public Utility District.

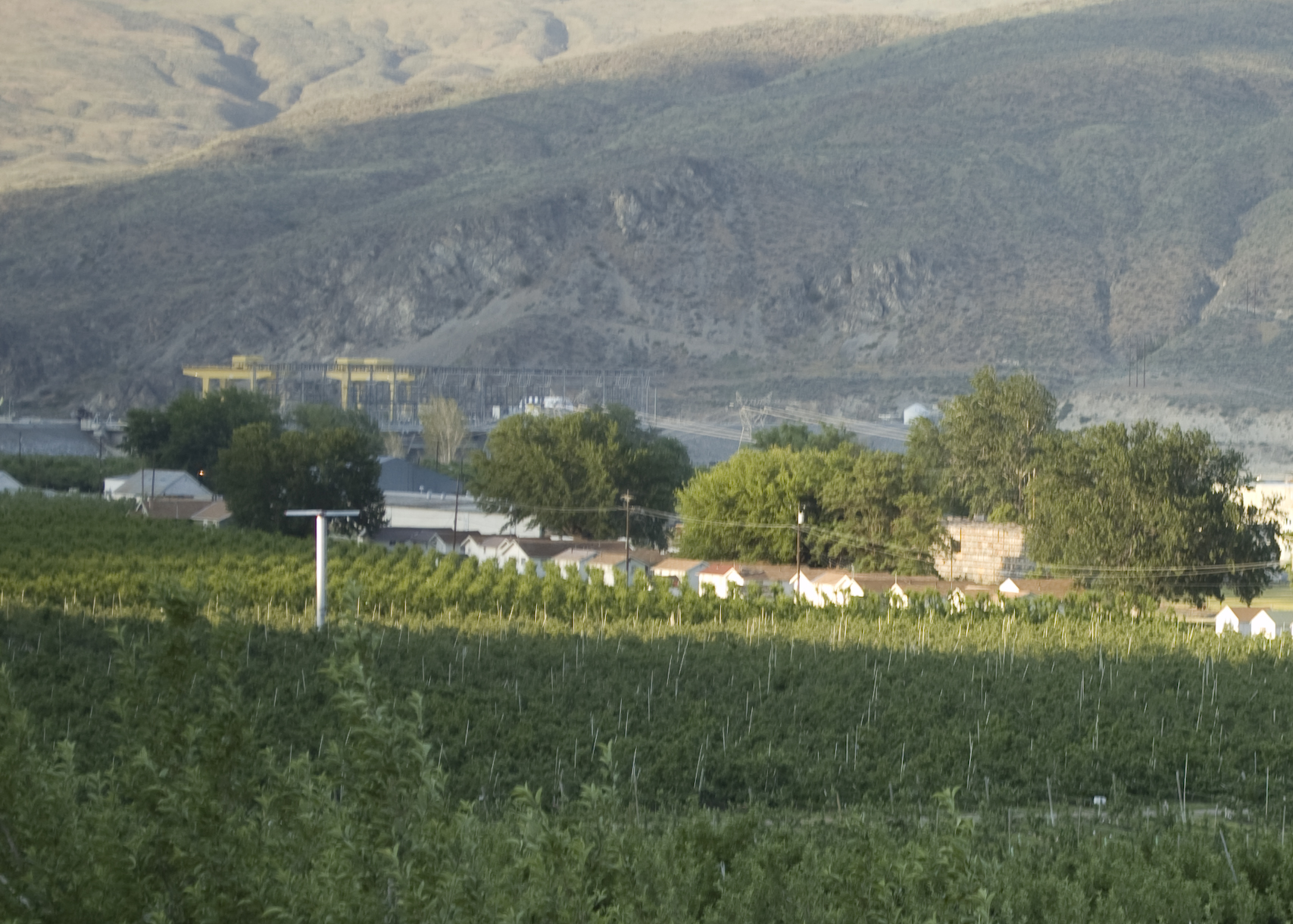
The yellow cranes and other equipment are part of Wells Dam

It has produced electricity since August 22, 1967. Its operating license from the US Federal Energy Regulatory Commission is next up for renewal in 2052. The Wells project has ten generating units rated at a combined 855.2 megawatts. In addition to the Douglas County and Okanogan County public utility districts, the project provides electricity to Puget Sound Energy, Portland General Electric, PacifiCorp, Avista Corporation, and the Confederated Tribes of the Colville Reservation.

Its reservoir is named Lake Pateros. Just below and adjacent is Carpenter Island boat launch and fish hatchery river access. Lake Pateros is not deep but a high volume of water moves through it. Thus, low-head, high-volume Kaplan turbine runners drive generation.

== Hydroelectric power capacity ==
Generator	Nameplate Capacity (MW)
U-1	77.4
U-2	89.0
U-3	89.0
U-4	89.0
U-5	89.0
U-6	89.0
U-7	89.0
U-8	77.4
U-9	77.4
U-10	89.0
Total	855.2

== See also ==
- List of dams in the Columbia River watershed
