= Lake Pateros =

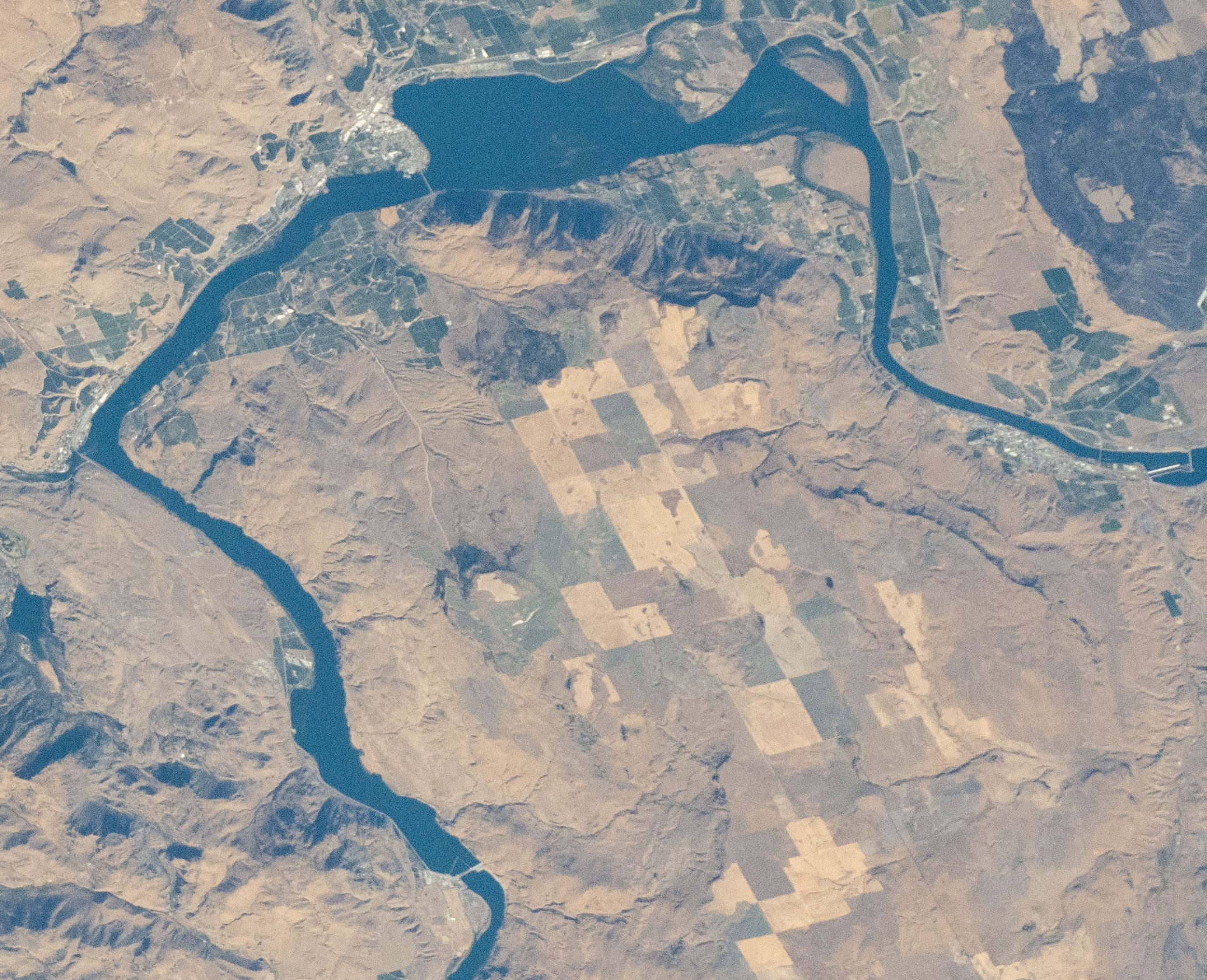
- Lake Pateros from ISS Expedition 72, October 2024

- Location within Washington (state) Location within the United States
- Location: Douglas / Okanogan / Chelan counties, Washington, US
- Coordinates: 47°56′51″N 119°51′56″W
- Type: reservoir
- Primary inflows: Columbia River, Okanogan River, Methow River
- Primary outflows: Columbia River
- Basin countries: United States
- Surface elevation: 784 ft (239 m)

Lake Pateros is a reservoir on the Columbia River in the U.S. state of Washington. It was created in 1967 with the construction of Wells Dam. The reservoir lies almost entirely in Douglas and Okanogan counties, although the dam itself lies partially in the easternmost portion of Chelan County. The reservoir stretches from there upstream to the Chief Joseph Dam. Towns on Lake Pateros include Pateros and Brewster, Washington.

Lake Pateros has been known by many variant names, including Butler Lake, Chief Long Jim Lake, Fort Okanogan Lake, Lake Azwell, and others.

== Gallery ==
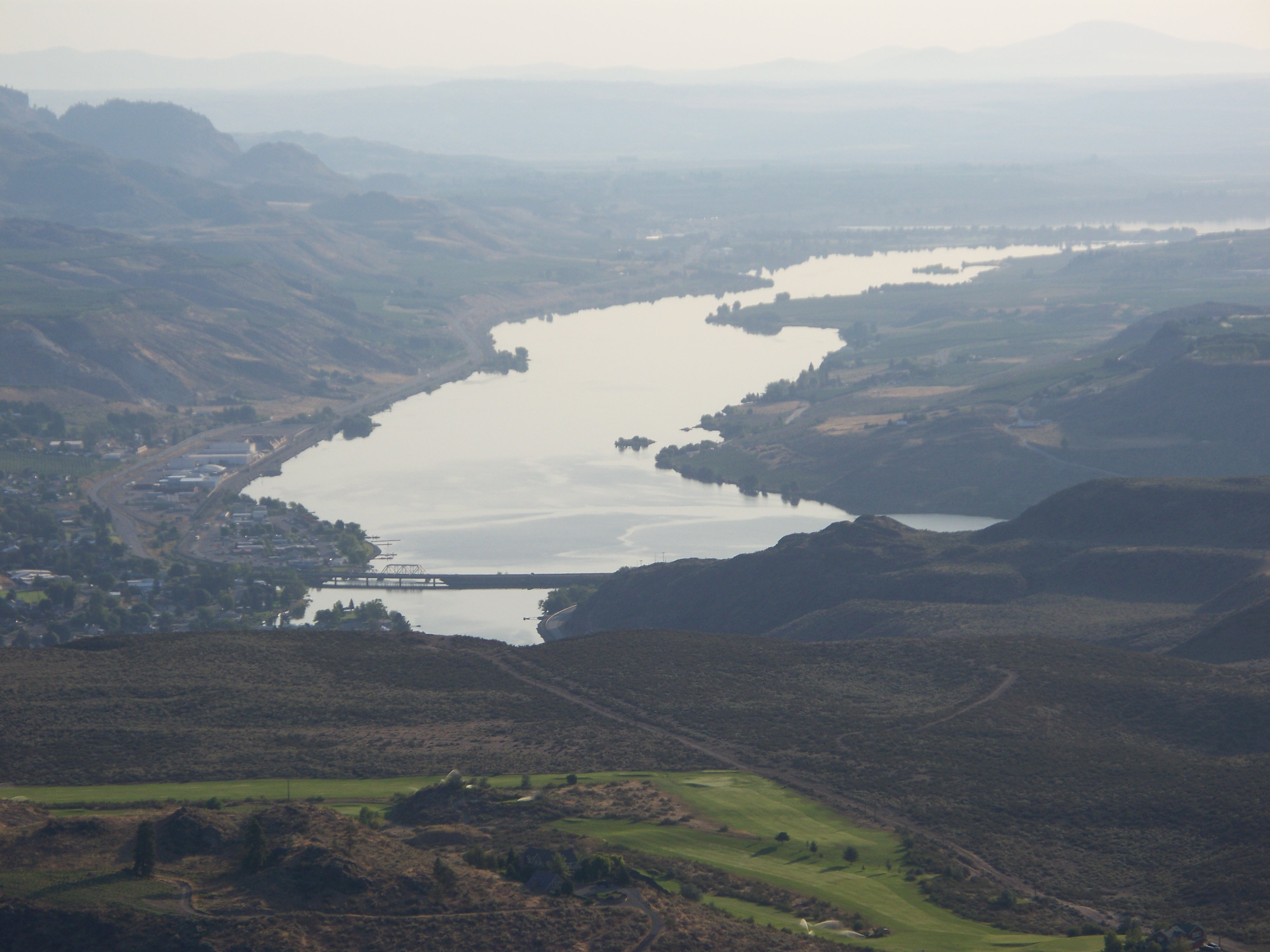
View from Alta Lake State Park, August 2008

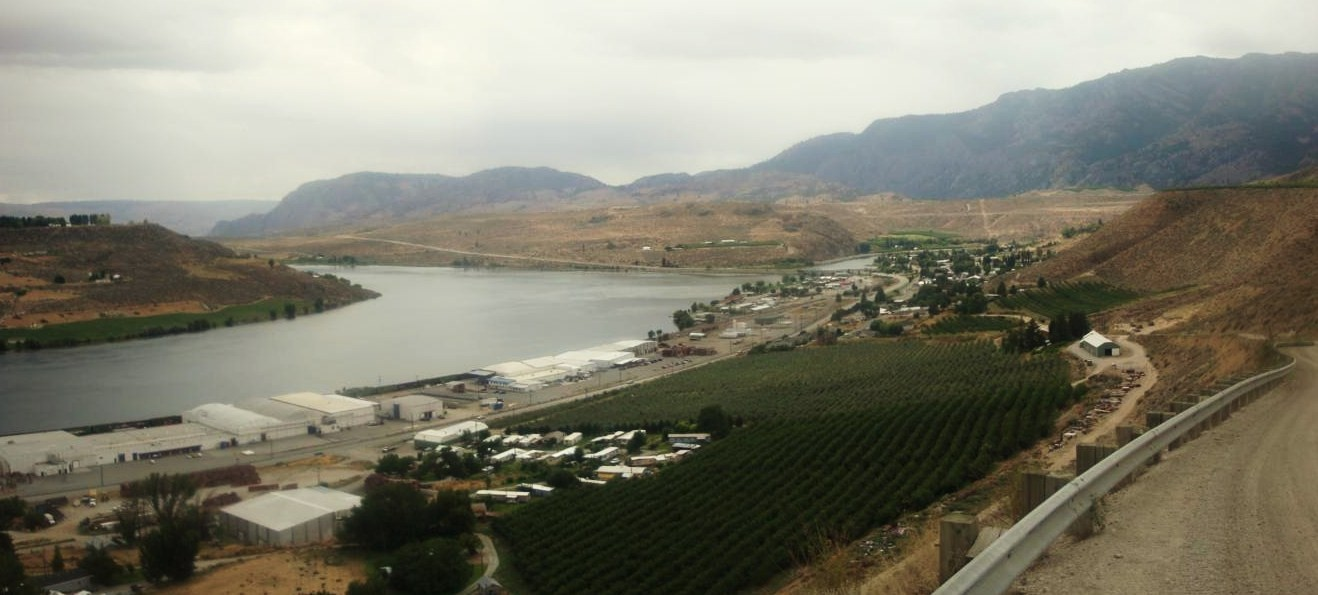
View from Pateros, Washington, August 2009

== See also ==
- List of dams in the Columbia River watershed
