= Gorge Dam =

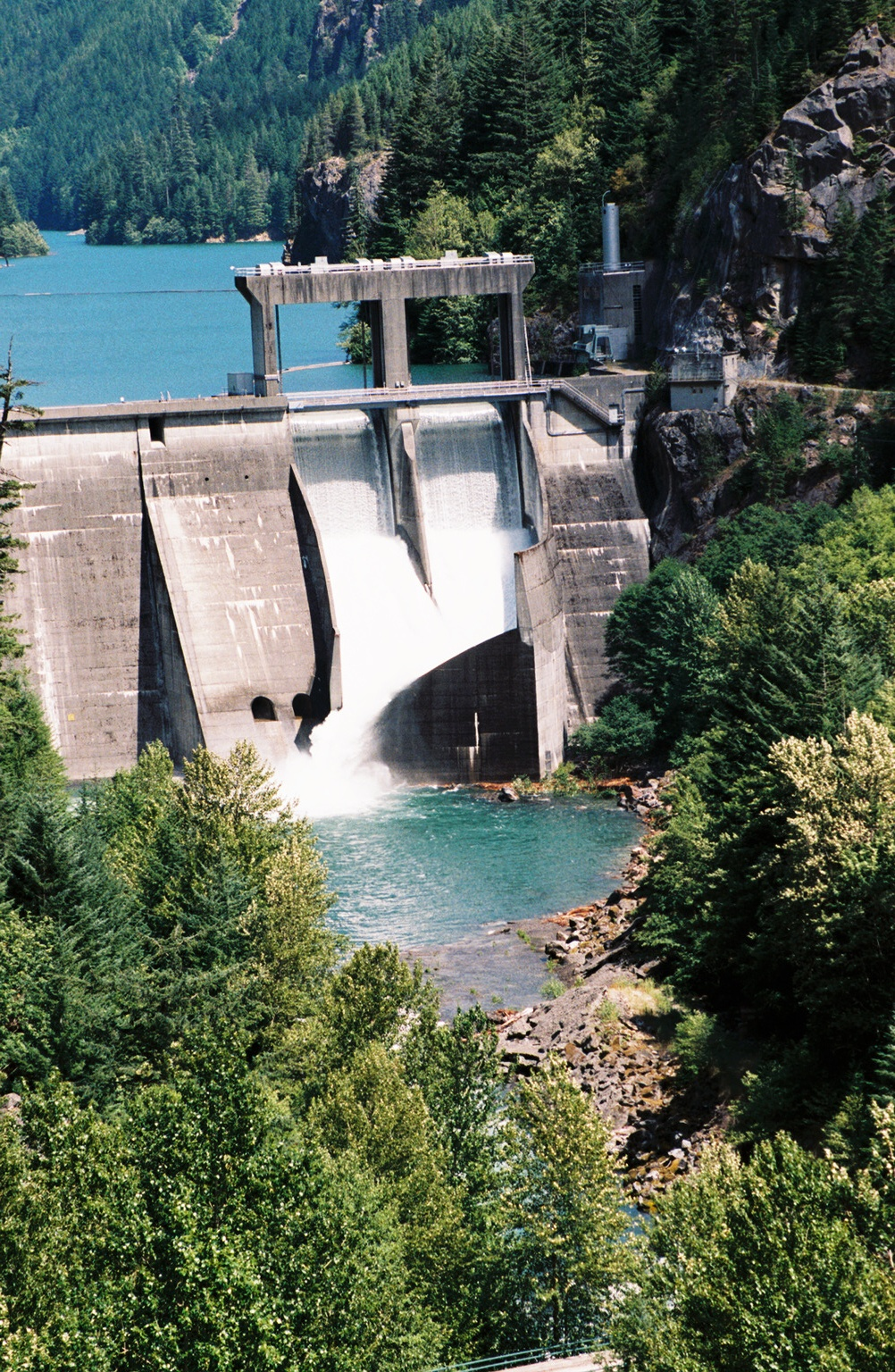
- Gorge Dam on the Skagit River in Washington State.
- Interactive map of Gorge Dam
- Official name: Gorge Creek High Dam
- Location: Whatcom County, Washington, USA
- Coordinates: 48°41′52″N 121°12′30″W

Dam and spillways
- Type of dam: Concrete arch-gravity
- Impounds: Skagit River
- Height: 300 feet (91 m)

Reservoir
- Creates: Gorge Lake

Power Station
- Turbines: 3x 36.8 MW, 1x 96.9 MW
- Installed capacity: 207.3 MW
- Annual generation: 688.958 GWh(2024)
- Website http://www.seattle.gov/city-light/energy-and-environment/power-supply-and-delivery/hydroelectric-resources#skagitriverhydroelectricproject

Gorge Dam is one of three along the upper Skagit River in Whatcom County, Washington, and part of the Skagit River Hydroelectric Project that supplies Seattle with some of its power needs. Construction on the original wooden Gorge Dam began in 1921, with its generators formally started by President Calvin Coolidge on September 17, 1924. In 1961, a new Gorge High Dam, made of concrete, was completed to replace the original.

A pivotal scene in the 1974 Warren Beatty film, The Parallax View, was shot at this location.

In 2020, the Upper Skagit Indian Tribe created an online petition calling for the removal of the Gorge Dam.

== Hydroelectric power capacity ==
Generator	Nameplate Capacity (MW)
21	36.8
22	36.8
23	36.8
24	96.9
Total	207.3

== See also ==
- List of dams and reservoirs in Washington
- Skagit River
