= Tacoma Power =

Electric utility in Washington, U.S.

- Formerly: Tacoma Light and Water Company (1884-1893)
- Company type: Division
- Industry: Electric power
- Founded: 1884; 142 years ago
- Founder: Charles B. Wright
- Headquarters: Tacoma, Washington, United States
- Area served: Tacoma, Washington area
- Parent: Tacoma Public Utilities
- Subsidiaries: Click! Network

Tacoma Power is a public utility providing electrical power to Tacoma, Washington and the surrounding areas. Tacoma Power serves the cities of Tacoma, University Place, Fircrest, and Fife, and also provides service to parts of Steilacoom, Lakewood, and unincorporated Pierce County. It is a division of the Tacoma Public Utilities and owns the Click! Network, developed by Steven Klein, Tacoma Power's former superintendent.

== History ==
In 1884, Charles B. Wright was granted the exclusive right to create Tacoma's first power and water company, incorporating the Tacoma Light and Water Company. Wright's system drew water from Tule and Spanaway Lakes and Clover Creek. The water was transported to the city through a 10-mile wooden flume that emptied into an in-town reservoir. The flume was mostly uncovered and attracted thirsty cows and children in search of a good wading pool. This led to the spread of disease.

Tacoma City Light was created in 1893 when the citizens of Tacoma voted to buy the privately owned Tacoma Light & Water Company to ensure its safety and longevity. Its first independent power generation came with the construction of LaGrande Dam on the Nisqually River, 36 miles away from the city, producing hydroelectric power as of November, 1912.

In 2011, Tacoma Power received the first-ever Award for Excellence in Energy Efficiency from the Bonneville Power Administration (BPA). The award recognizes Tacoma Power's "exceptional creativity, leadership and achievement in the pursuit of energy efficiency." The utility competed against other utilities and organizations served by BPA in Washington, Oregon, Idaho and Montana.

== See also ==
- PUD No. 1 of Jefferson County v. Washington Department of Ecology
