= Douglas County Public Utility District =

Coordinates: 47°25′18″N 120°17′47″W

Public Utility District #1 of Douglas County
- Logo
- Type: State-owned
- Industry: Public Utility
- Founded: 1936
- Headquarters: East Wenatchee
- Products: Electric utility
- Production output: 3,502.38 GWh - Wells Dam (2024)
- Website: https://douglaspud.org

The Douglas County Public Utility District, or Douglas County PUD, is a public co-operative energy district providing service to Douglas County, Washington. It is owned by its customers and governed by a Board of Commissioners elected by the customer-owners. Though it is not regulated by another governmental unit, a PUD is, by state statute, a nonprofit corporation. PUDs must comply with state regulations for municipal corporations. The local customer-owner of the PUD receives dividends in the form of reduced rates for service.

== History ==
Organized in 1936, Douglas County Public Utility District did not begin operations until 1945, nearly 10 years later. After acquiring components of the existing electrical grid, Douglas County PUD began extending service into the more rural areas of the county. At that time, Douglas County PUD received electrical current from the Bonneville Power Administration.

In the 1950s and 1960s, Douglas County PUD began the necessary steps to build and license Wells Dam on the Columbia River. In 1967, Douglas County PUD began generating operations at Wells Dam. At the time, Douglas County PUD did not put that electricity into its own grid due to the high cost, instead sold it to four other utilities who financed the project by purchasing the power.

Today, Wells Dam generates most of the power used by Douglas County residents. The dam produces much more electricity than is used by consumers in Douglas County, which allows the PUD to sell excess power to other utility districts. As a result, Douglas County has some of the cheapest electricity rates in the country.

== Other utilities ==
Douglas County PUD owns and operates a High-Speed Fiber Optic Broadband Internet Network, called the Douglas County Community Network (DCCN), which allows customers in rural parts of the county to connect to Broadband Internet through 11 different local providers. This network doubles as a way for PUD to remotely control and monitor its electrical system.

In 2025, PUD opened a hydrogen production facility in East Wenatchee, designed to use excess hydropower from the Wells Hydroelectric Project. At full capacity, the facility uses 5 MW of power and can produce up to 2 metric tons of hydrogen a day.

== See also ==
- East Wenatchee, Washington
- Waterville, Washington
