= Alder, Washington =

Census-designated place in Pierce County, Washington, United States

- CDP
- Location within the state of Washington
- Coordinates: 46°47′07″N 122°15′35″W
- Country: United States
- State: Washington
- County: Pierce

Area
  - Total: 3.24 sq mi (8.4 km^{2})
  - Land: 3.21 sq mi (8.3 km^{2})
  - Water: 0.03 sq mi (0.078 km^{2})
- Elevation: 1,332 ft (406 m)

Population (2010)
  - Total: 227
- Time zone: UTC-8 (Pacific (PST))
  - Summer (DST): UTC-7 (PDT)
- ZIP Code: 98335
- Area code(s): 360, 564
- GNIS feature ID: 2584941

Alder is a census-designated place (CDP) in Pierce County, Washington, United States. As of the 2020 census, Alder had a population of 212.

== Description ==
The community is located along the shore of Alder Lake on State Route Highway 7 near the entrance to Mount Rainier National Park.

A post office called Alder was established in 1902, and remained in operation until 1975. The community was named for the alder trees near the original town site.

== Geography ==
According to the United States Census Bureau, the CDP has a total area of 3.24 square miles (8.4 km^{2}), of which, 3.21 square miles (8.3 km^{2}) of it is land and 0.03 square miles (0.08 km^{2}) of it (0.83%) is water.

== Demographics ==
Historical population
| Census | Pop. | Note | %± |
|---|---|---|---|
| 2010 | 227 | | — |
| 2020 | 212 | | −6.6% |
U.S. Decennial Census; 2000 2010

Alder first appeared as a census designated place in the 2010 U.S. census.

=== Racial and ethnic composition ===
Alder CDP, Washington – Racial and ethnic composition Note: the US Census treats Hispanic/Latino as an ethnic category. This table excludes Latinos from the racial categories and assigns them to a separate category. Hispanics/Latinos may be of any race.
| Race / Ethnicity (NH = Non-Hispanic) | Pop 2010 | Pop 2020 | % 2010 | % 2020 |
|---|---|---|---|---|
| White alone (NH) | 209 | 175 | 92.07% | 82.55% |
| Black or African American alone (NH) | 2 | 1 | 0.88% | 0.47% |
| Native American or Alaska Native alone (NH) | 2 | 3 | 0.88% | 1.42% |
| Asian alone (NH) | 1 | 0 | 0.44% | 0.00% |
| Native Hawaiian or Pacific Islander alone (NH) | 0 | 0 | 0.00% | 0.00% |
| Other race alone (NH) | 0 | 0 | 0.00% | 0.00% |
| Mixed race or Multiracial (NH) | 5 | 20 | 2.20% | 9.43% |
| Hispanic or Latino (any race) | 8 | 13 | 3.52% | 6.13% |
| Total | 227 | 212 | 100.00% | 100.00% |

== See also ==
- List of census-designated places in Washington
