= Marcus Peak =

Mountain in Washington (state), United States

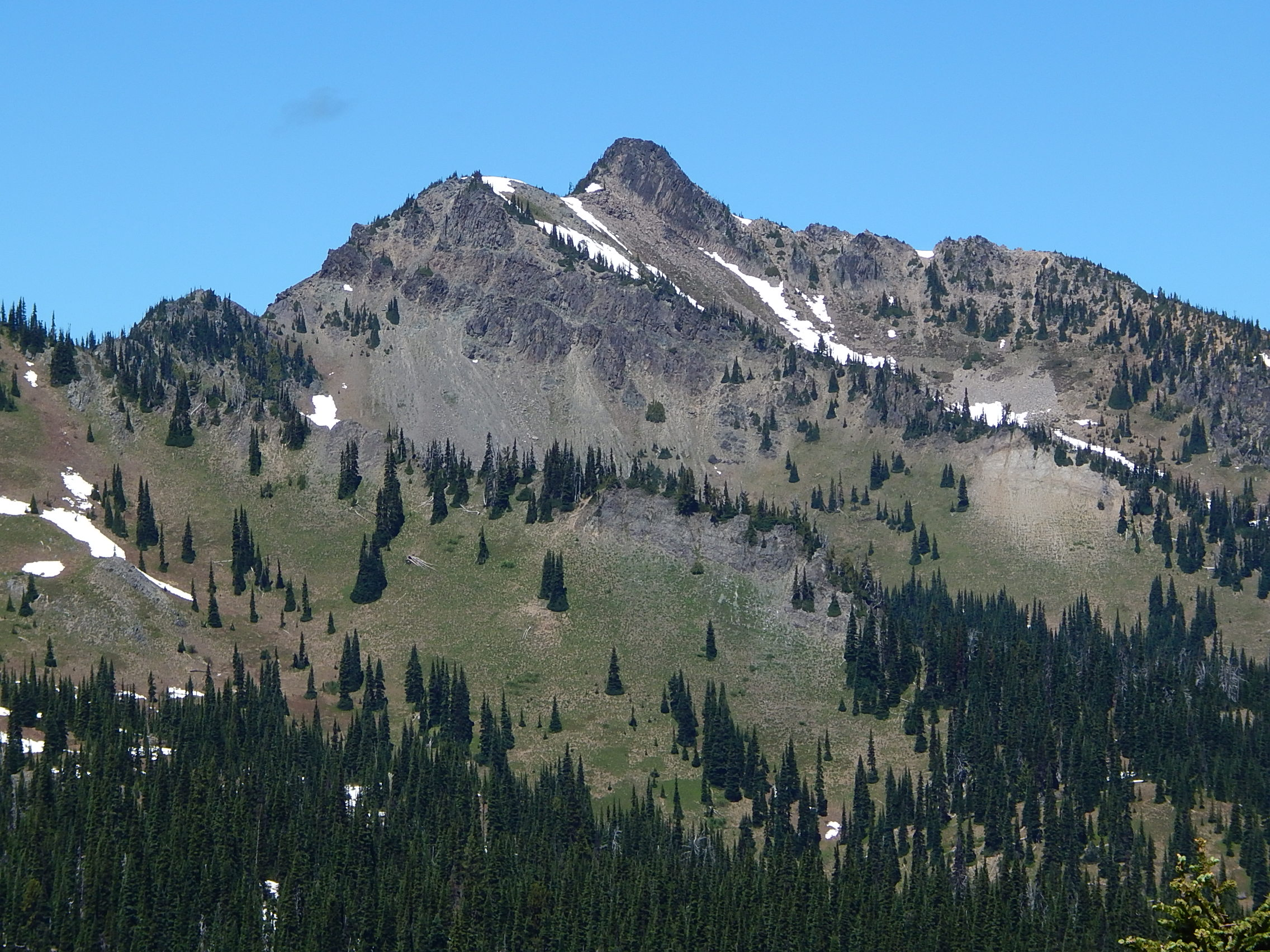
- Marcus Peak seen from Sunrise Point

Highest point
- Elevation: 6,962 ft (2,122 m)
- Prominence: 482 ft (147 m)
- Parent peak: Palisades Peak
- Isolation: 0.70 mi (1.13 km)
- Coordinates: 46°56′16″N 121°36′29″W

Naming
- Etymology: Marcus Whitman

Geography
- Location within Washington (state) Location within the United States
- Country: United States
- State: Washington
- County: Pierce
- Protected area: Mount Rainier National Park
- Parent range: Cascades
- Topo map: USGS White River Park

Geology
- Rock type(s): Andesite, Basalt

Climbing
- Easiest route: Scrambling class 3

Marcus Peak is a 6,962-foot (2,122 m) summit located in Mount Rainier National Park in Pierce County of Washington state. It is part of the Sourdough Mountains which are a small subset of the Cascade Range, and it is situated north of Dege Peak. The peak was named in 1932 for Marcus Whitman (1802–1847), an early pioneer and physician. The Whitman Glacier on Little Tahoma also honors him. Access to Marcus Peak is limited due to snow closing the Sunrise Road much of the year. July, August, and September are typically the months when the Sunrise Road is seasonally open for vehicle traffic. The nearest higher peak is Palisades Peak, 0.64 miles (1.03 km) to the north-northeast. Precipitation runoff from Marcus Peak drains into the White River.

== Climate ==
Marcus Peak is located in the marine west coast climate zone of western North America. Most weather fronts originating in the Pacific Ocean travel northeast toward the Cascade Mountains. As fronts approach, they are forced upward by the peaks of the Cascade Range (orographic lift), causing them to drop their moisture in the form of rain or snow onto the Cascades. As a result, the west side of the Cascades experiences high precipitation, especially during the winter months in the form of snowfall. Because of maritime influence, snow tends to be wet and heavy, resulting in high avalanche danger. During winter months, weather is usually cloudy, but due to high pressure systems over the Pacific Ocean that intensify during summer months, there is often little or no cloud cover during the summer.
