= Palisades Peak =

Mountain in Washington (state), United States

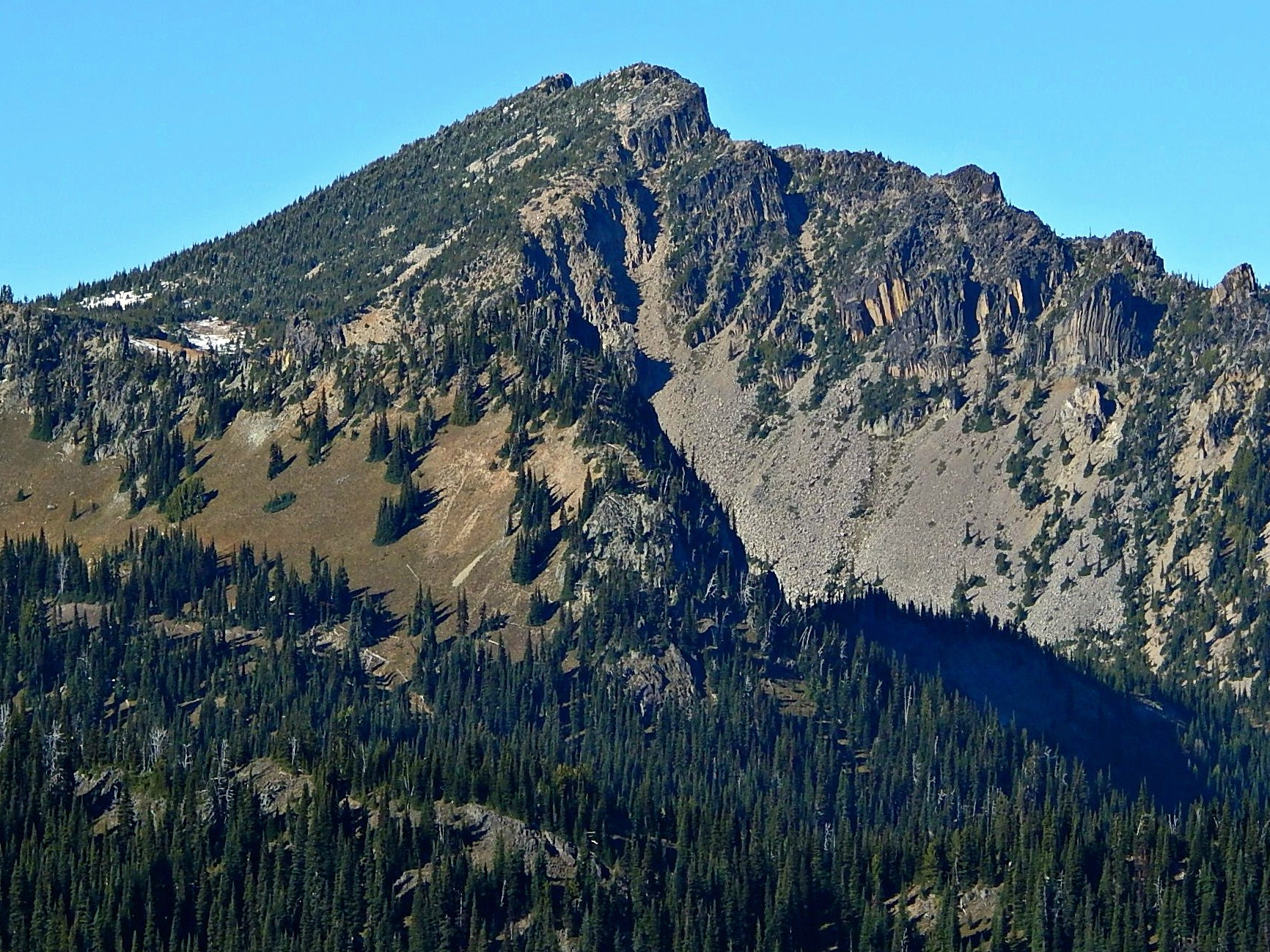
- Palisades Peak seen from Sunrise Point

Highest point
- Elevation: 7,040 ft (2,146 m)
- Prominence: 600 ft (183 m)
- Parent peak: Mount Fremont (7,214 ft)
- Isolation: 3.58 mi (5.76 km)
- Coordinates: 46°56′52″N 121°36′17″W

Geography
- Location within Washington (state) Location within the United States
- Country: United States
- State: Washington
- County: Pierce
- Protected area: Mount Rainier National Park
- Parent range: Cascades
- Topo map: USGS White River Park

Geology
- Rock type(s): Andesite, Basalt

Climbing
- Easiest route: class 3 scrambling

Palisades Peak is a 7,040-foot (2,146 m) summit located in Mount Rainier National Park in Pierce County of Washington state. It is part of the Sourdough Mountains, a subset of the Cascade Range, and is situated 0.6 mile north of Marcus Peak. The peak's descriptive name stems from the resemblance of its columnar basalt cliffs to a palisade. Access is via Palisades Lakes Trail which starts at Sunrise Point. Access to Sunrise Point is limited due to snowpack closing the Sunrise Road much of the year. July, August, and September are typically the months when the Sunrise Road is seasonally open for vehicle traffic. Precipitation runoff from Palisades Peak drains into the White River.

== Climate ==
Palisades Peak is located in the marine west coast climate zone of western North America. Most weather fronts originating in the Pacific Ocean travel northeast toward the Cascade Mountains. As fronts approach, they are forced upward by the peaks of the Cascade Range (orographic lift), causing them to drop their moisture in the form of rain or snow onto the Cascades. As a result, the west side of the Cascades experiences high precipitation, especially during the winter months in the form of snowfall. Because of maritime influence, snow tends to be wet and heavy, resulting in high avalanche danger. During winter months, weather is usually cloudy, but due to high pressure systems over the Pacific Ocean that intensify during summer months, there is often little or no cloud cover during the summer.

== See also ==
- Geology of the Pacific Northwest

== Gallery ==
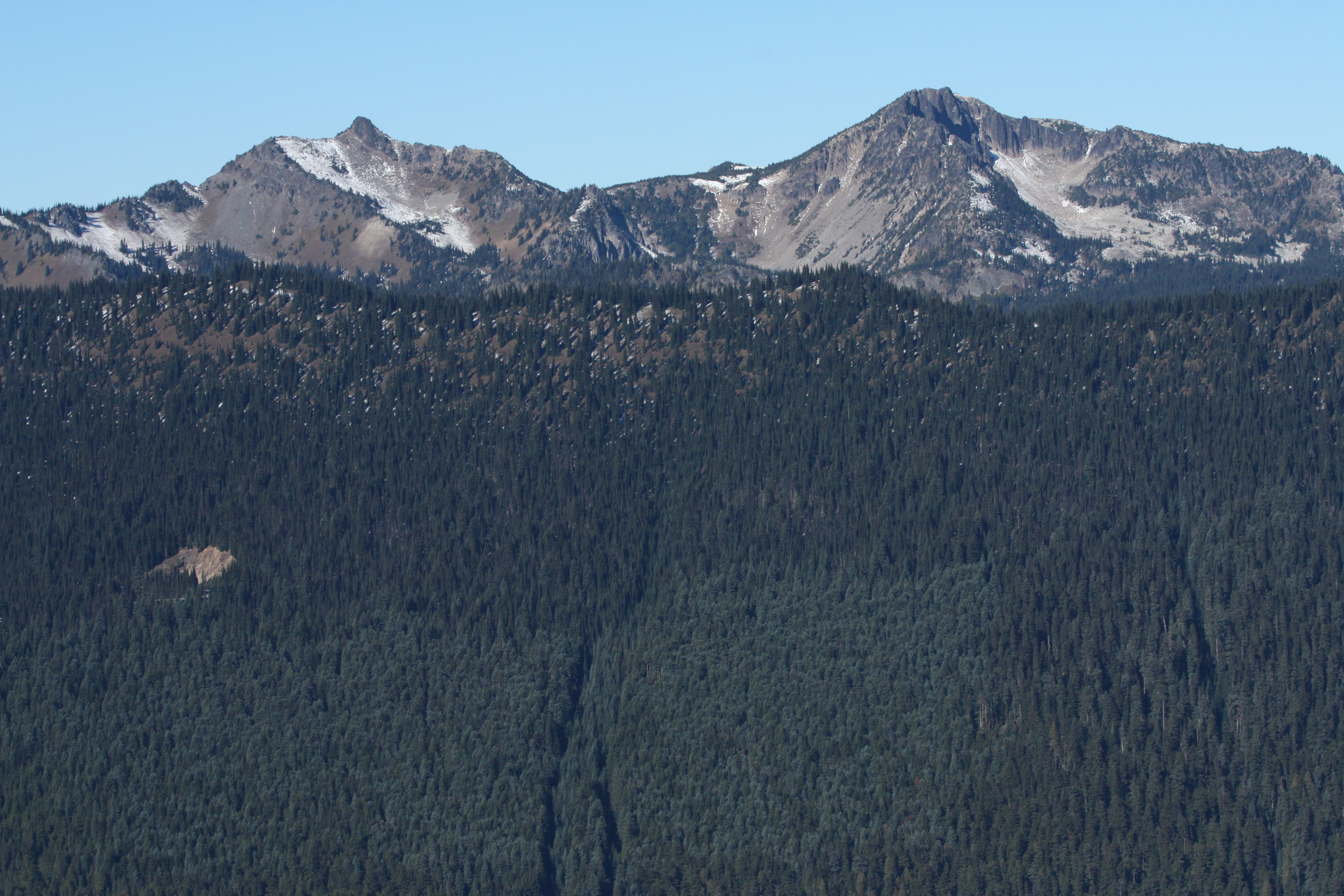
Marcus Peak (left) with Palisades Peak (right)

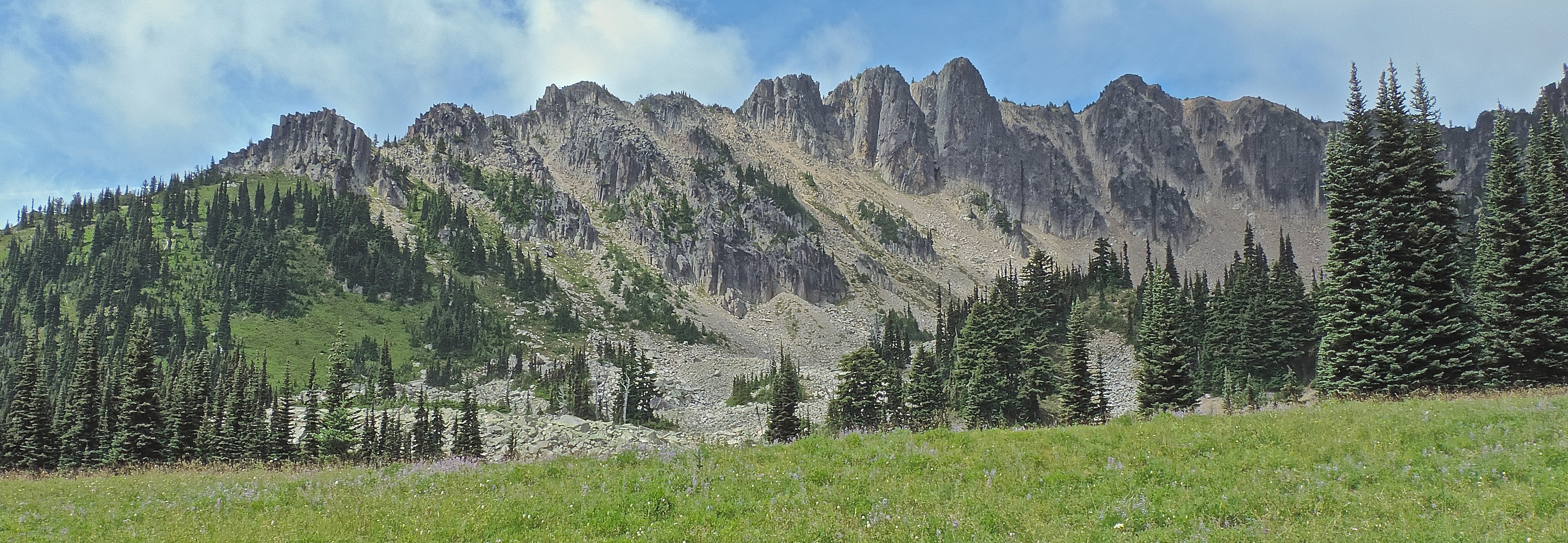
Palisades

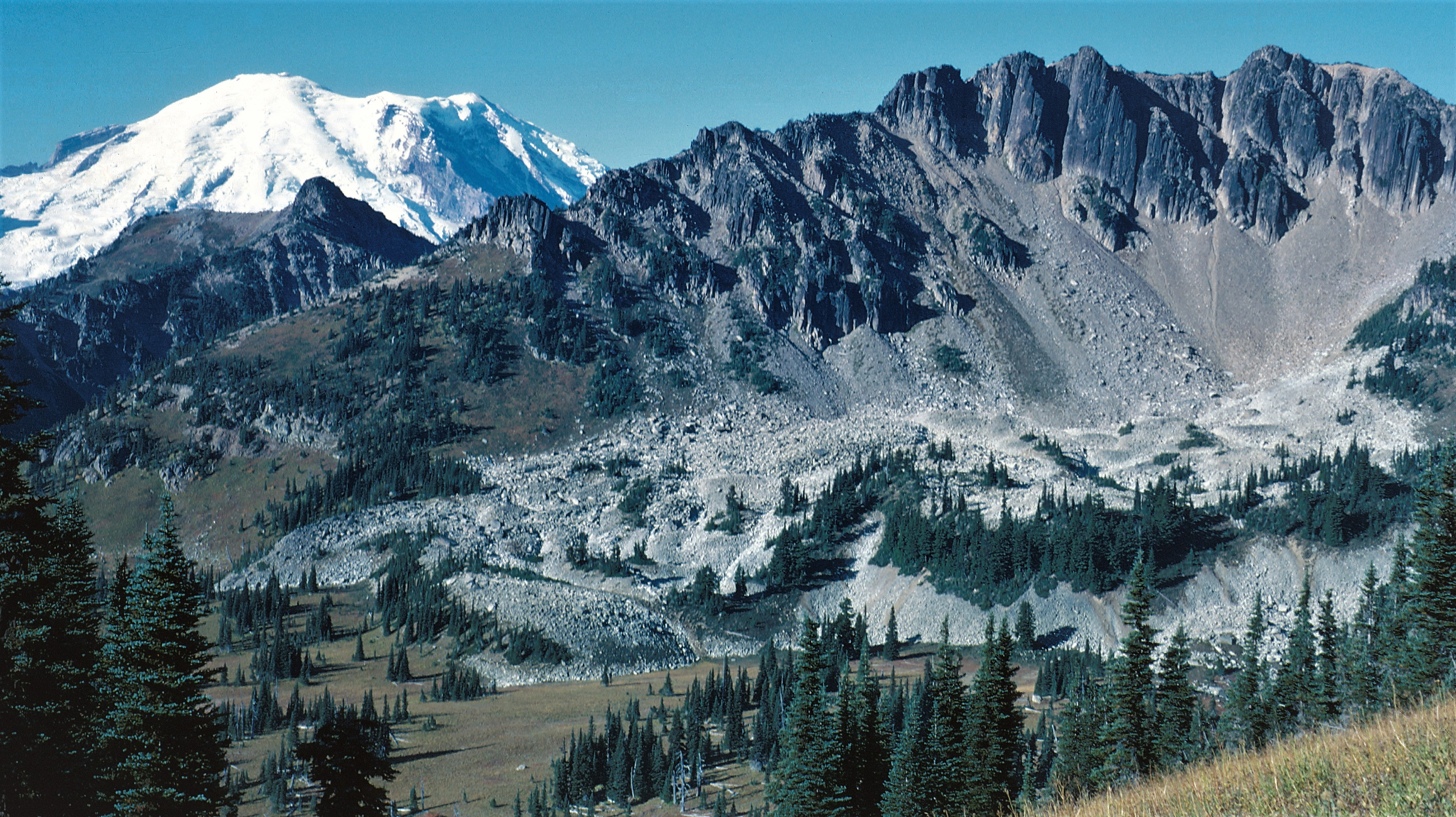
Mt. Rainier (left) and Palisades Peak (right)
