= Antler Peak (Washington) =

Mountain in Washington (state), United States

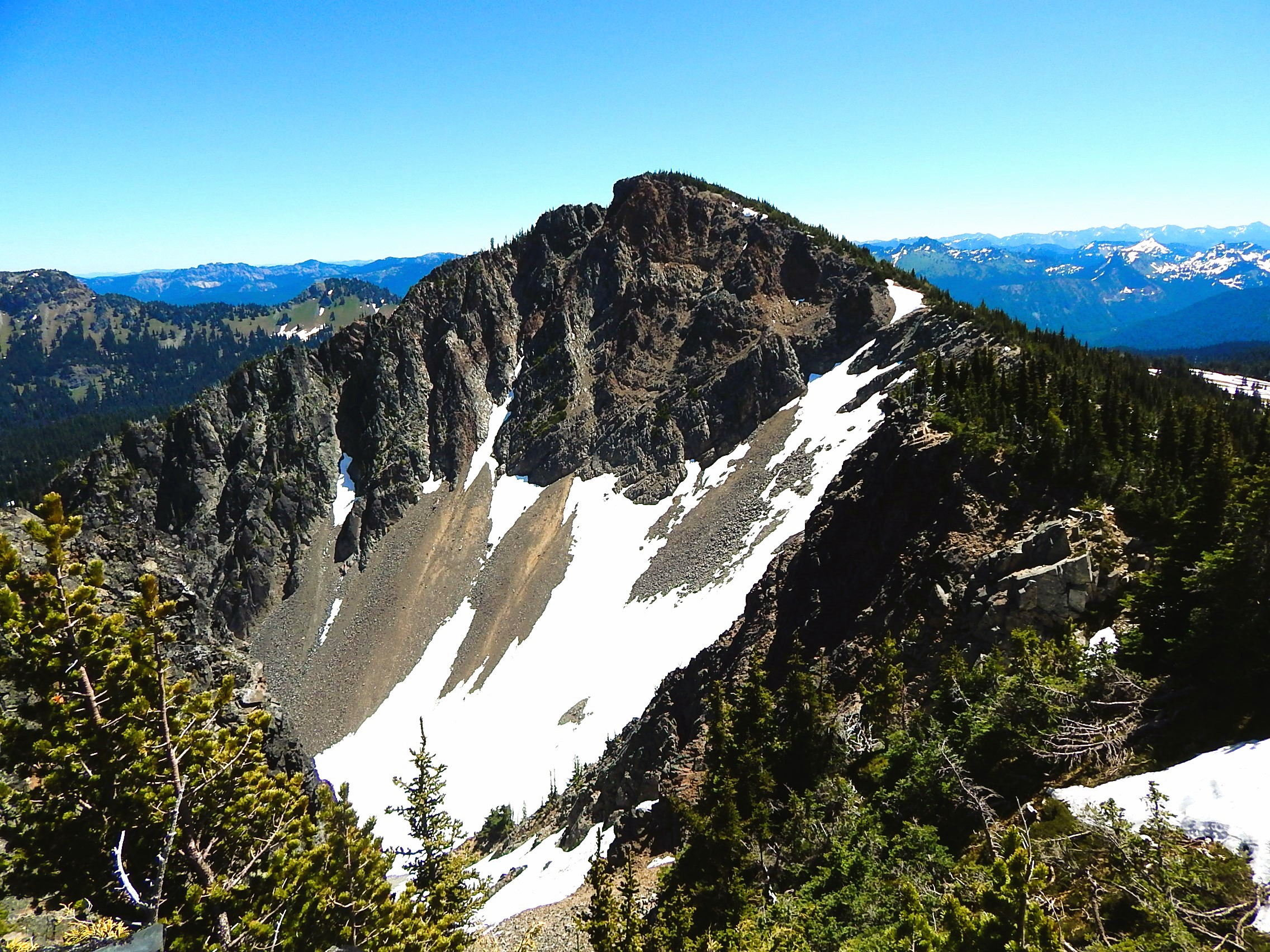
- Antler Peak seen from the west

Highest point
- Elevation: 7,017 ft (2,139 m)
- Prominence: 377 ft (115 m)
- Parent peak: Mount Fremont
- Isolation: 1.97 mi (3.17 km)
- Coordinates: 46°55′12″N 121°37′56″W

Geography
- Location within Washington (state) Location within the United States
- Country: United States
- State: Washington
- County: Pierce
- Protected area: Mount Rainier National Park
- Parent range: Cascades
- Topo map: USGS Sunrise

Climbing
- Easiest route: Scrambling class 2

Antler Peak is a 7,017-foot (2,139-metre) summit located in Mount Rainier National Park in Pierce County of Washington state. It is part of the Sourdough Mountains, a subset of the Cascade Range. Antler Peak is situated west of Dege Peak and northeast of Sunrise Historic District, with the Sourdough Ridge Trail traversing the south slope of Antler between the two. Mount Fremont is the nearest higher peak, 1.55 mi (2.49 km) to the west. Precipitation runoff from Antler Peak drains into the White River.

== Climate ==
Antler Peak is located in the marine west coast climate zone of western North America. Most weather fronts originating in the Pacific Ocean travel northeast toward the Cascade Mountains. As fronts approach, they are forced upward by the peaks of the Cascade Range (Orographic lift), causing them to drop their moisture in the form of rain or snow onto the Cascades. As a result, the west side of the Cascades experiences high precipitation, especially during the winter months in the form of snowfall. Because of maritime influence, snow tends to be wet and heavy, resulting in high avalanche danger. During winter months, weather is usually cloudy, but due to high pressure systems over the Pacific Ocean that intensify during summer months, there is often little or no cloud cover during the summer.

== See also ==
- Geology of the Pacific Northwest

== Gallery ==
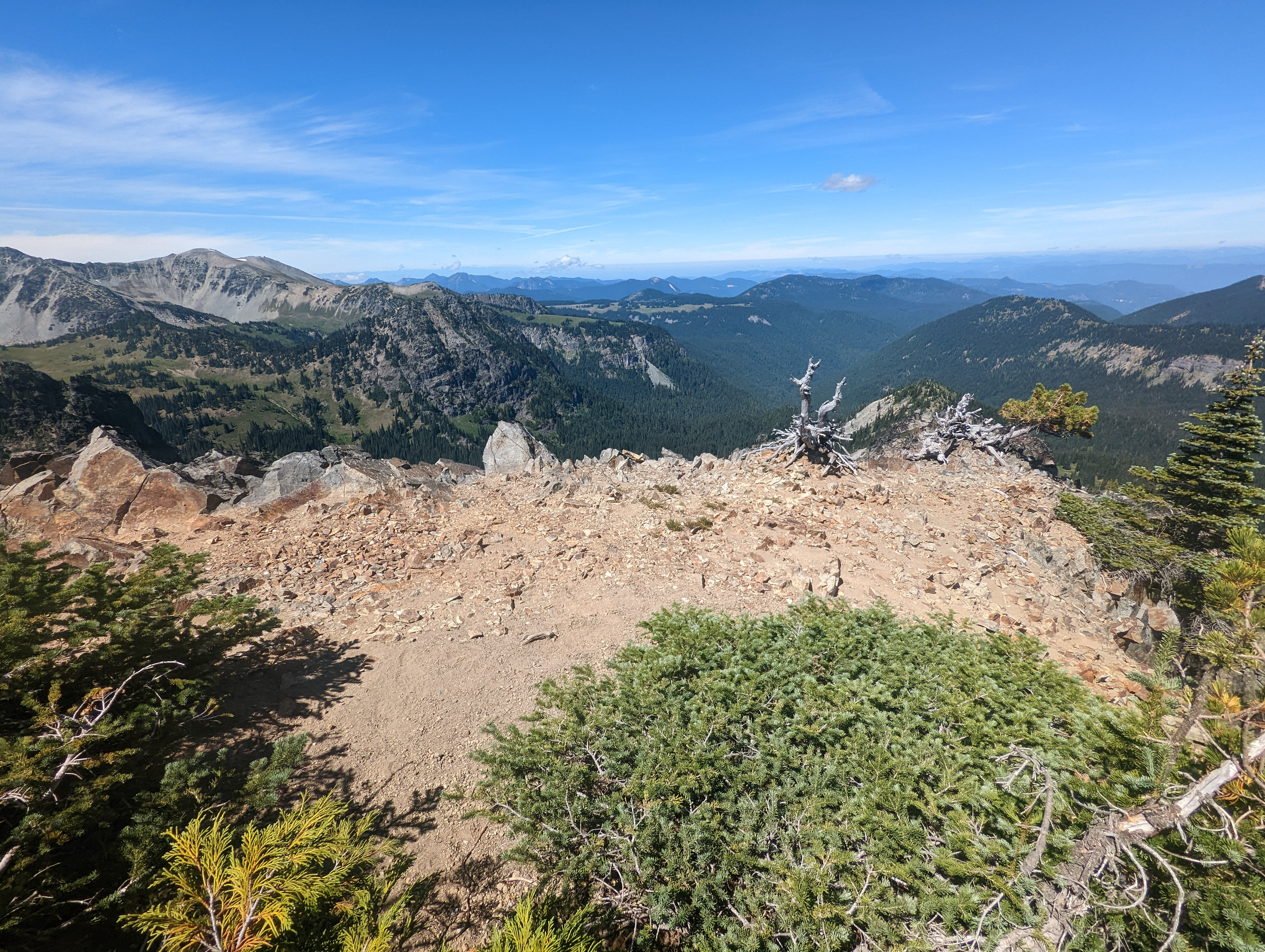
Summit of Antler Peak

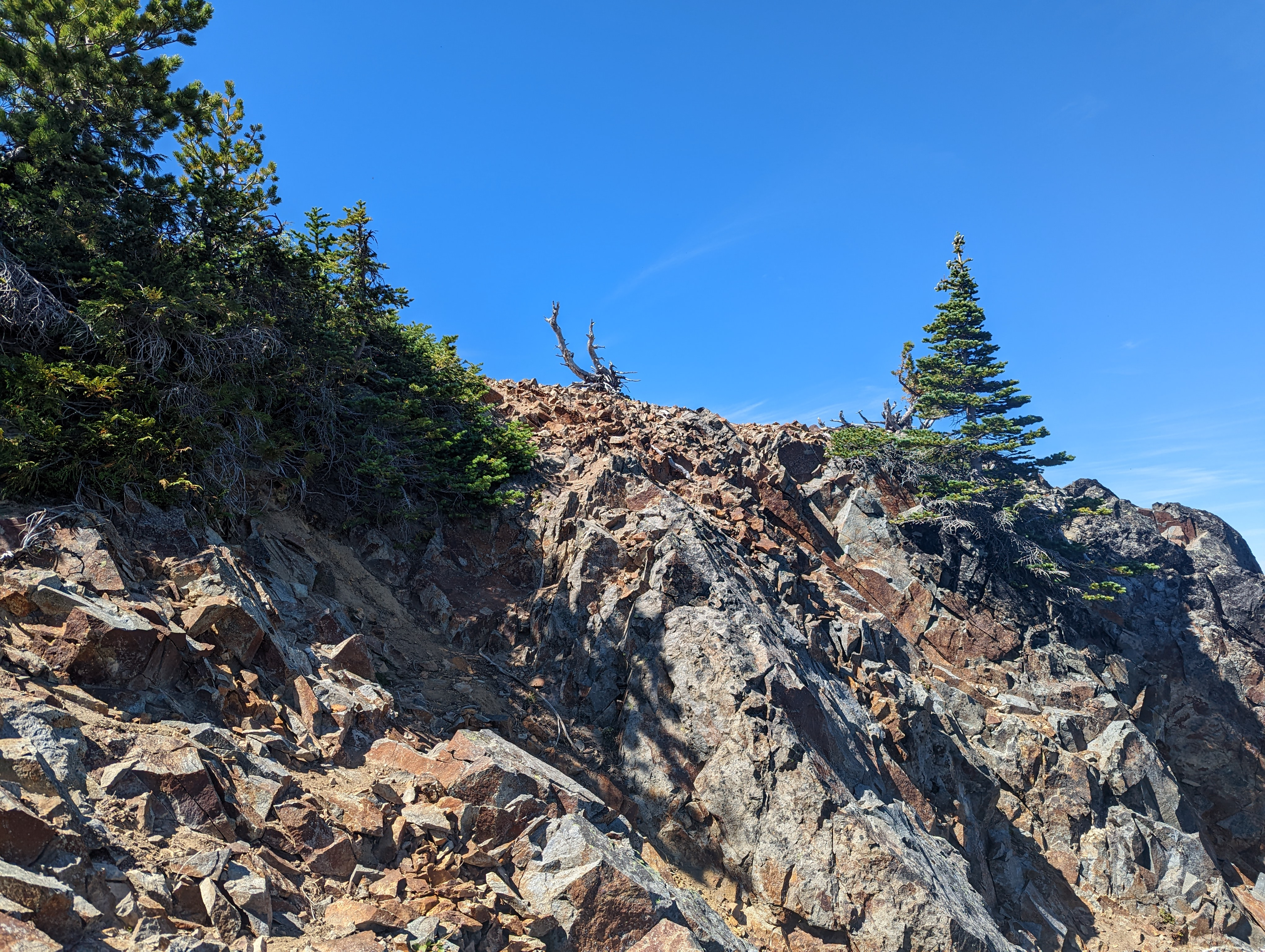
East approach to Antler Peak, just below the summit

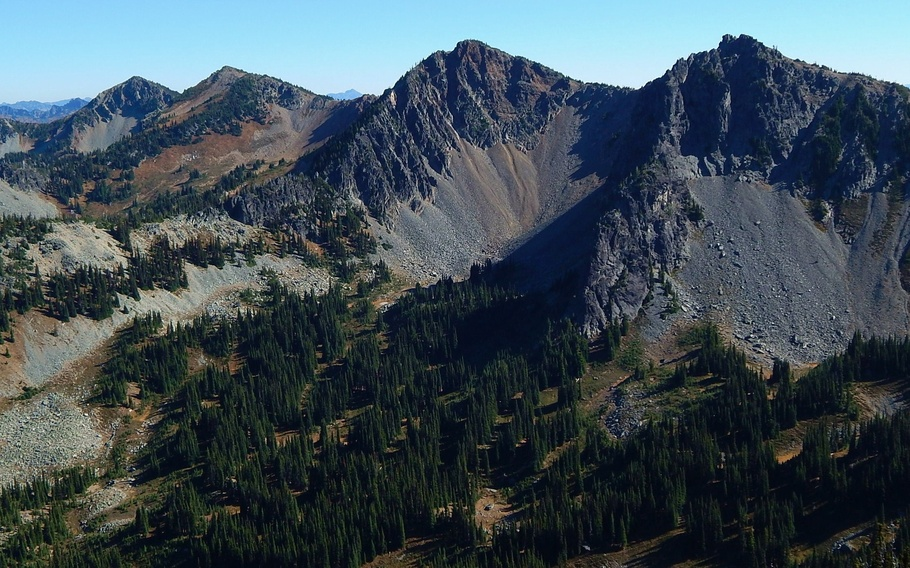
Antler Peak (centered) seen from McNeeley Peak
