= McNeeley Peak (Washington) =

Mountain in Washington (state), United States

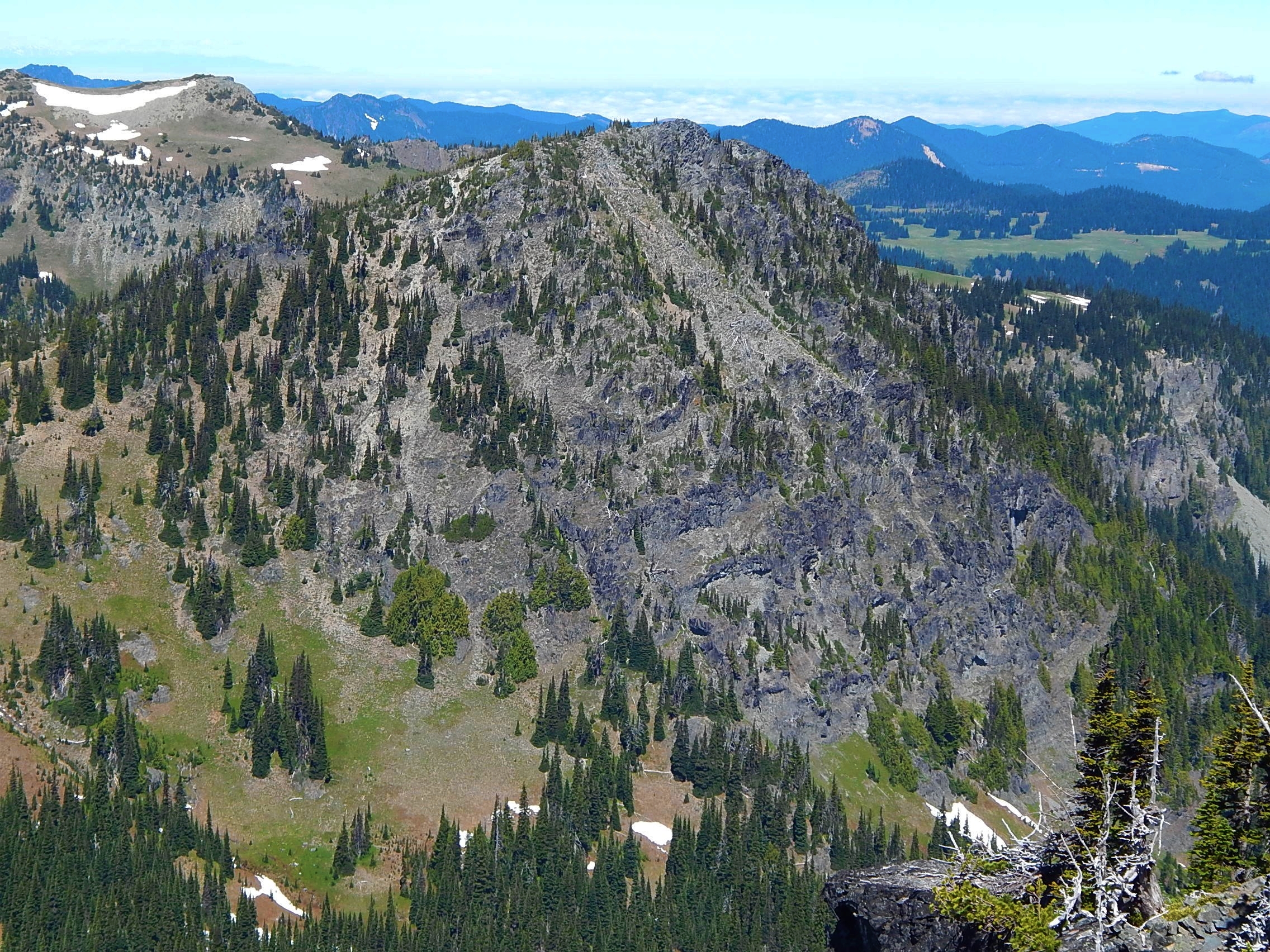
- McNeeley Peak seen from the southeast

Highest point
- Elevation: 6,786 ft (2,068 m)
- Prominence: 306 ft (93 m)
- Parent peak: Mount Fremont (7,317 ft)
- Isolation: 0.9 mi (1.4 km)
- Coordinates: 46°55′42″N 121°38′49″W

Geography
- Location within Washington (state) Location within the United States
- Country: United States
- State: Washington
- County: Pierce
- Protected area: Mount Rainier National Park
- Parent range: Cascades
- Topo map: USGS Sunrise

Climbing
- Easiest route: Scrambling class 2

McNeeley Peak is a 6,786-foot-elevation (2,068 m) summit located in Mount Rainier National Park in Pierce County of Washington state. It is part of the Sourdough Mountains, a subset of the Cascade Range. McNeeley Peak is situated north of the Sunrise Historic District, east of Mount Fremont, and northwest of Antler Peak. The peak was named in 1932 for Edwin J. McNeeley (born 1858), a prominent Tacoma businessman. Access is limited by snow closing the Sunrise Road much of the year. July, August, and September are typically the months when the Sunrise Road is seasonally open for vehicle traffic. Precipitation runoff from McNeeley Peak drains into the White River.

== Climate ==
McNeeley Peak is located in the marine west coast climate zone of western North America. Most weather fronts originating in the Pacific Ocean travel northeast toward the Cascade Mountains. As fronts approach, they are forced upward by the peaks of the Cascade Range (orographic lift), causing them to drop their moisture in the form of rain or snow onto the Cascades. As a result, the west side of the Cascades experiences high precipitation, especially during the winter months in the form of snowfall. Because of maritime influence, snow tends to be wet and heavy, resulting in high avalanche danger. During winter months, weather is usually cloudy, but due to high pressure systems over the Pacific Ocean that intensify during summer months, there is often little or no cloud cover during the summer. The months July through September offer the most favorable weather for viewing or climbing this peak.

== Gallery ==
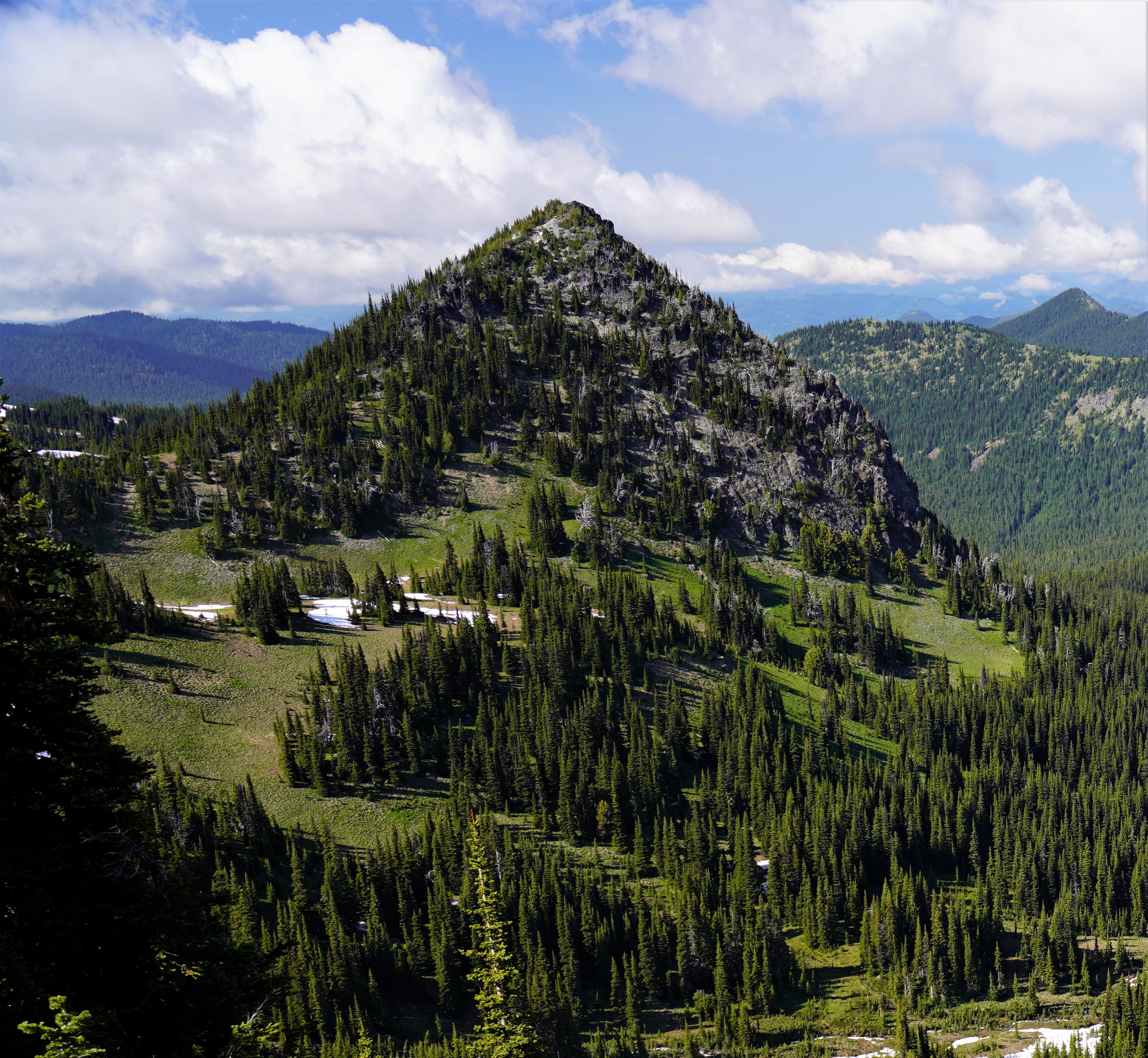
South aspect

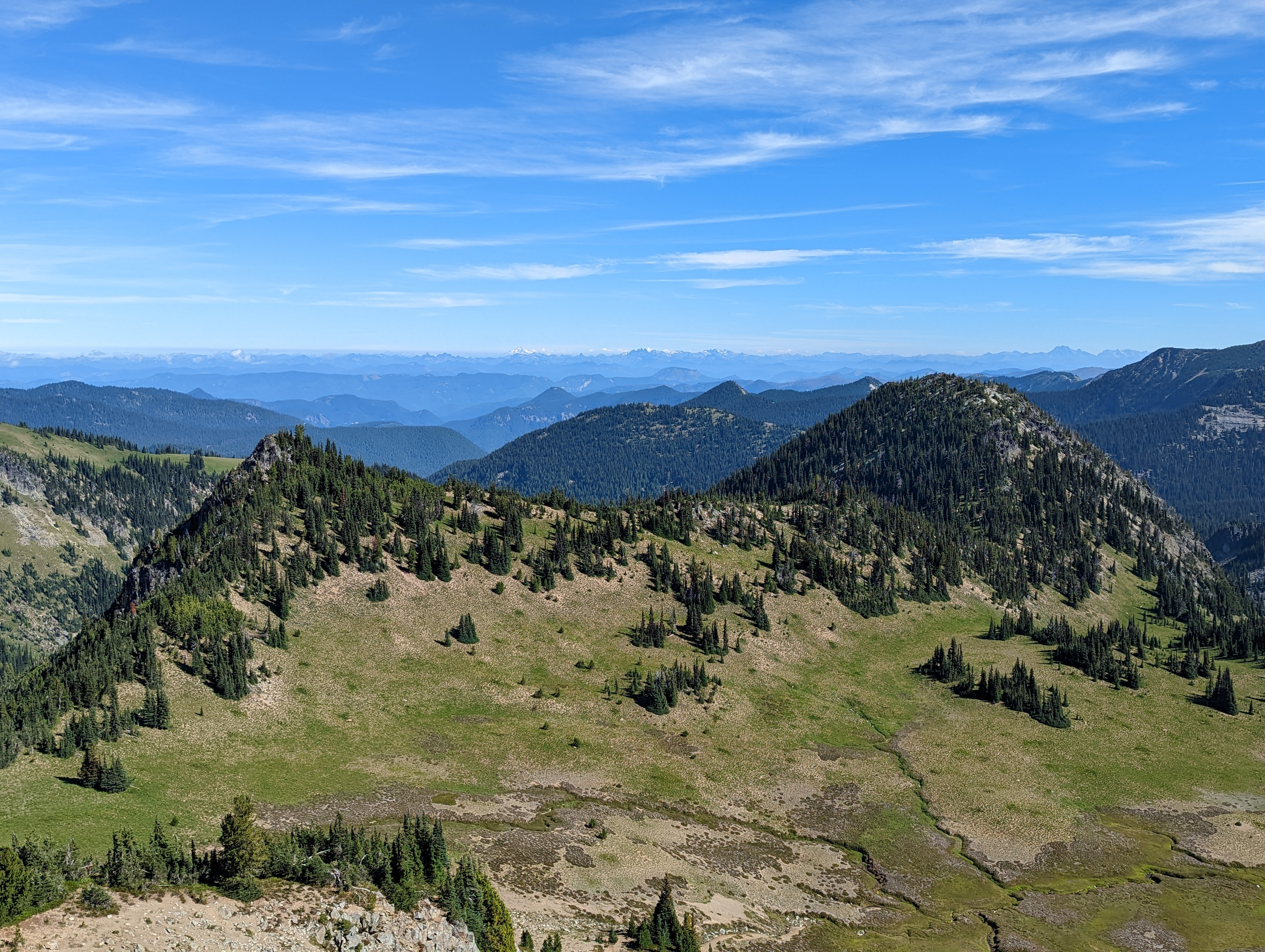
McNeeley Peak (right) and its western sub-peak (left) as viewed from the Huckleberry Creek Trail to the south

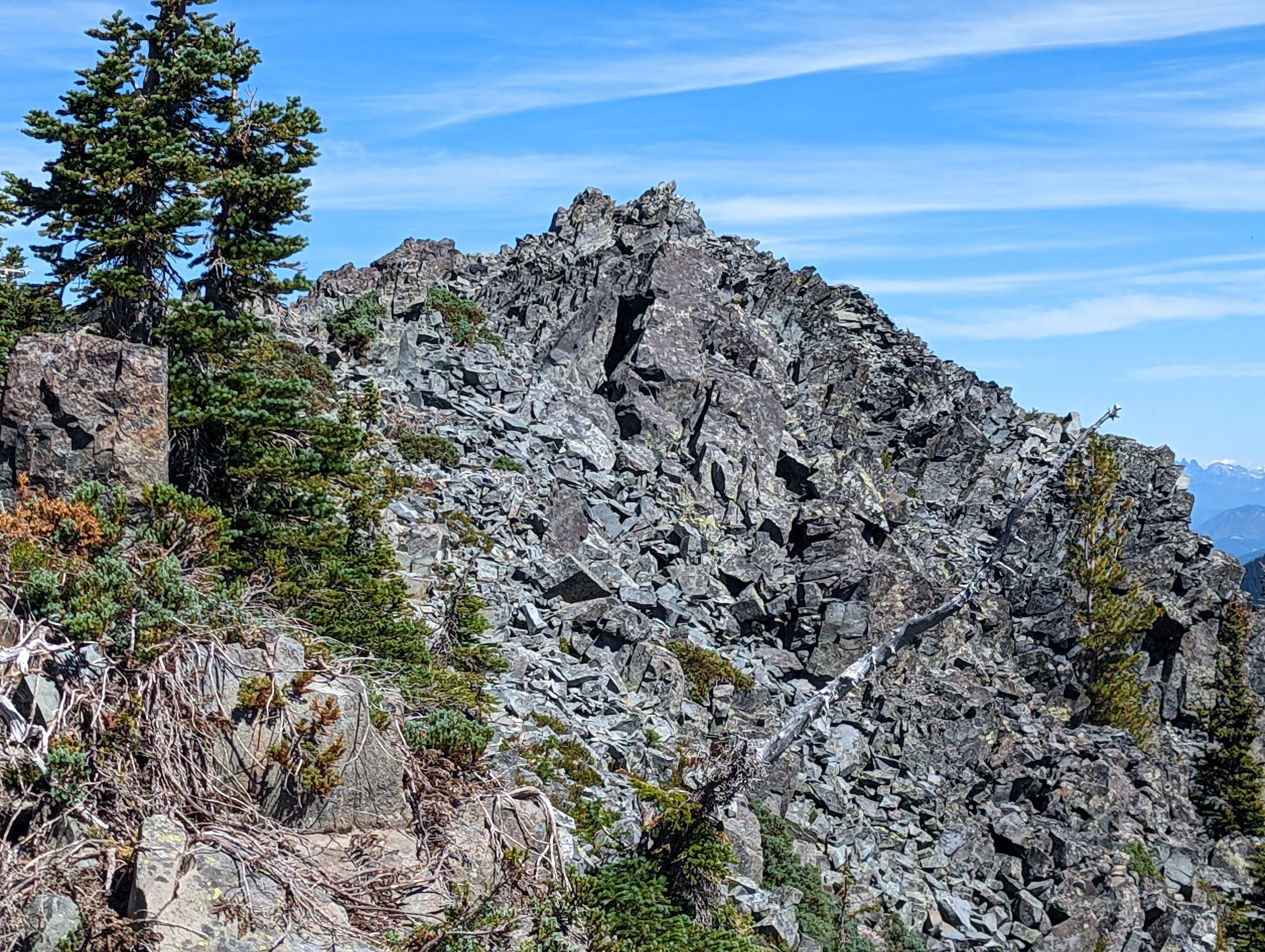
Summit of McNeeley Peak from the southwest

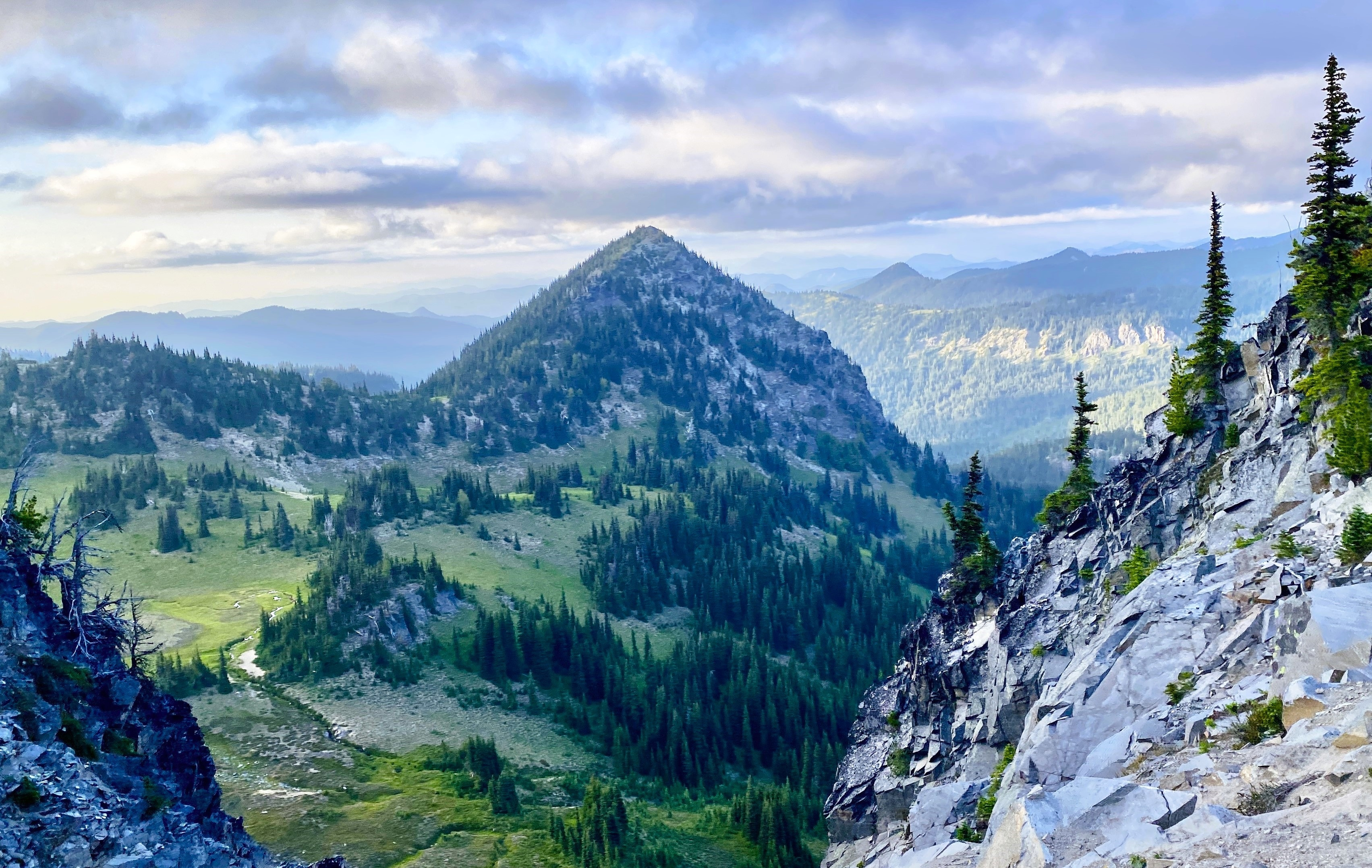

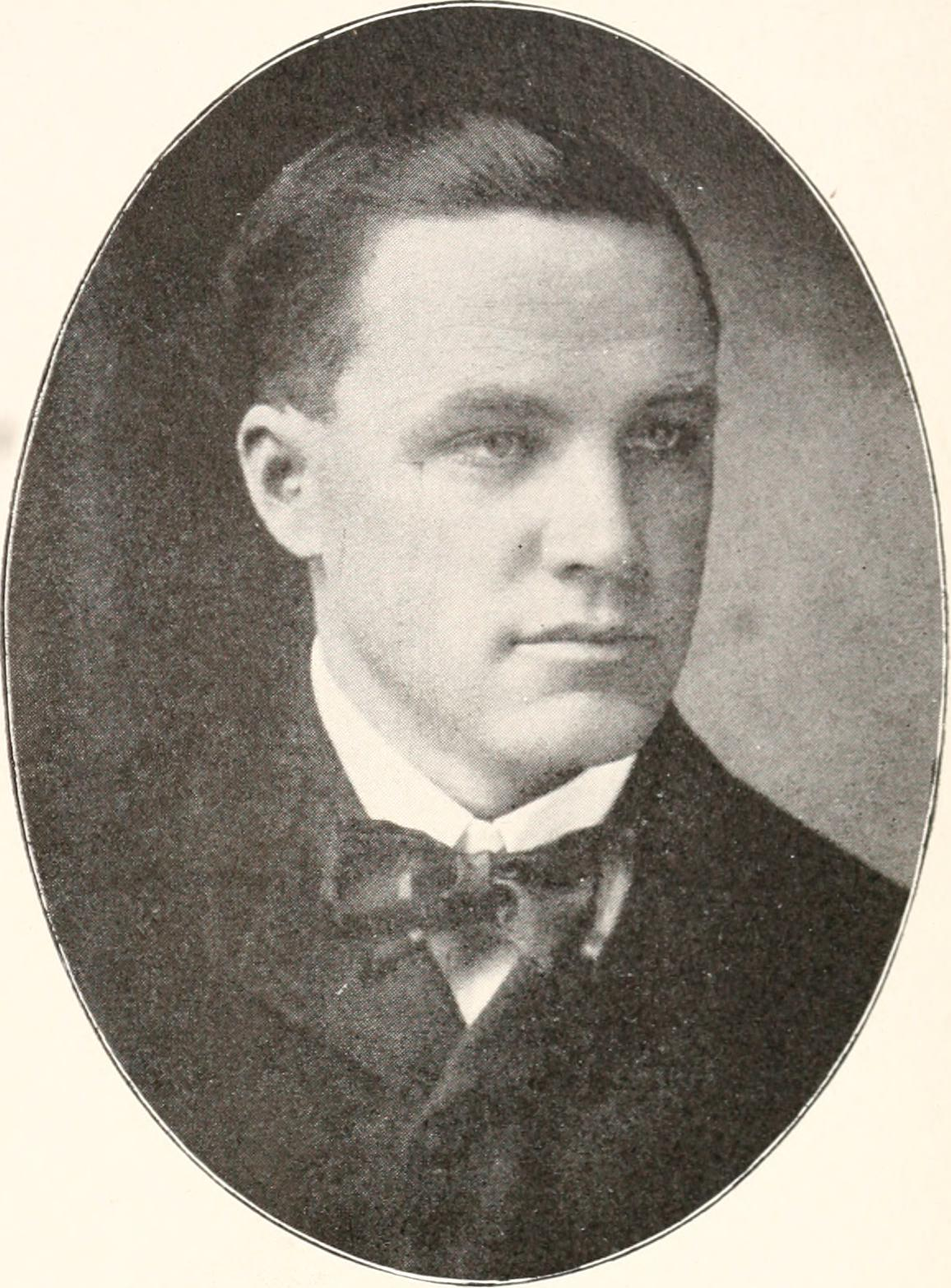
Edwin J. McNeeley, the peak's namesake

== See also ==
- Geography of Washington (state)
- Geology of the Pacific Northwest
