= Dege Peak =

Mountain in Washington (state), United States

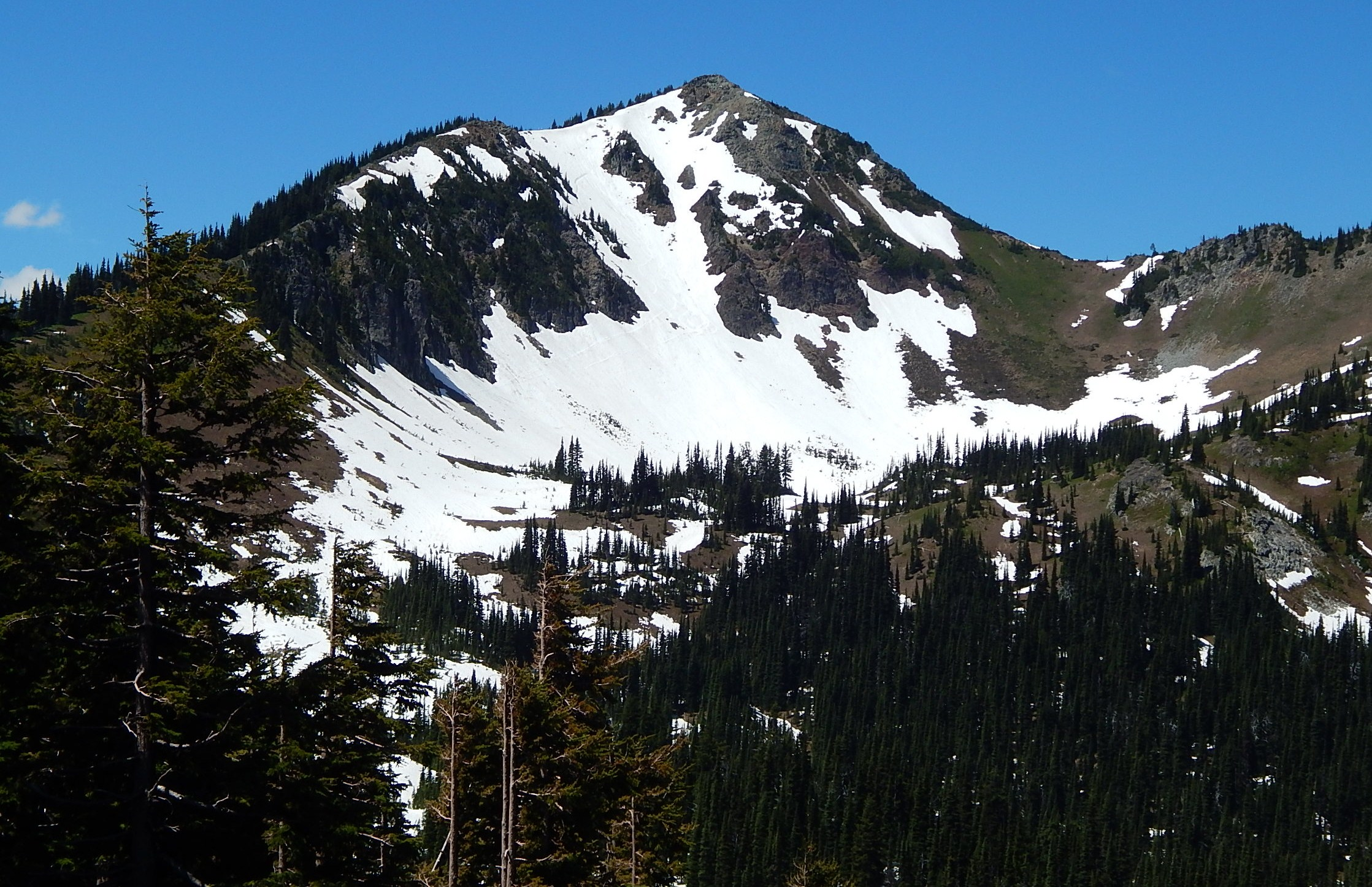
- Dege Peak seen from the east at Sunrise Point

Highest point
- Elevation: 7,009 ft (2,136 m)
- Prominence: 320 ft (98 m)
- Parent peak: Antler Peak (7,017 ft)
- Isolation: 1.03 mi (1.66 km)
- Coordinates: 46°55′07″N 121°36′38″W

Geography
- Location within Washington (state) Location within the United States
- Country: United States
- State: Washington
- County: Pierce
- Protected area: Mount Rainier National Park
- Parent range: Cascades
- Topo map: USGS White River Park

Climbing
- Easiest route: class 1 Trail

Dege Peak is a 7,009-foot (2,136 m) summit located in Pierce County of Washington state. It is part of the Sourdough Mountains in Mount Rainier National Park. It was named in 1932 for James Henry Dege (born 1868), a prominent Tacoma businessman and Captain of the First Regiment National Guard of Washington.

The peak is a popular hiking destination with views of the Emmons Glacier, Winthrop Glacier, Inter Glacier, Fryingpan Glacier, Little Tahoma Peak, and views in all directions because the trail is above tree line. The trail starts at the Sunrise Historic District. Access is limited by snowpack closing the Sunrise Road much of the year. July, August, and September are the months when the Sunrise Road is seasonally open for vehicle traffic.

Antler Peak is the nearest higher neighbor, 1.03 mi (1.66 km) to the west. Precipitation runoff from Dege Peak drains into the White River.

== Climate ==
Dege Peak is located in the marine west coast climate zone of western North America. Most weather fronts originating in the Pacific Ocean travel northeast toward the Cascade Mountains. As fronts approach, they are forced upward by the peaks of the Cascade Range (orographic lift), causing them to drop their moisture in the form of rain or snow onto the Cascades. As a result, the west side of the Cascades experiences high precipitation, especially during the winter months in the form of snowfall. Because of maritime influence, snow tends to be wet and heavy, resulting in high avalanche danger. During winter months, weather is usually cloudy, but due to high pressure systems over the Pacific Ocean that intensify during summer months, there is often little or no cloud cover during the summer. The months of July through September offer the most favorable weather for viewing or climbing this peak.

== Gallery ==
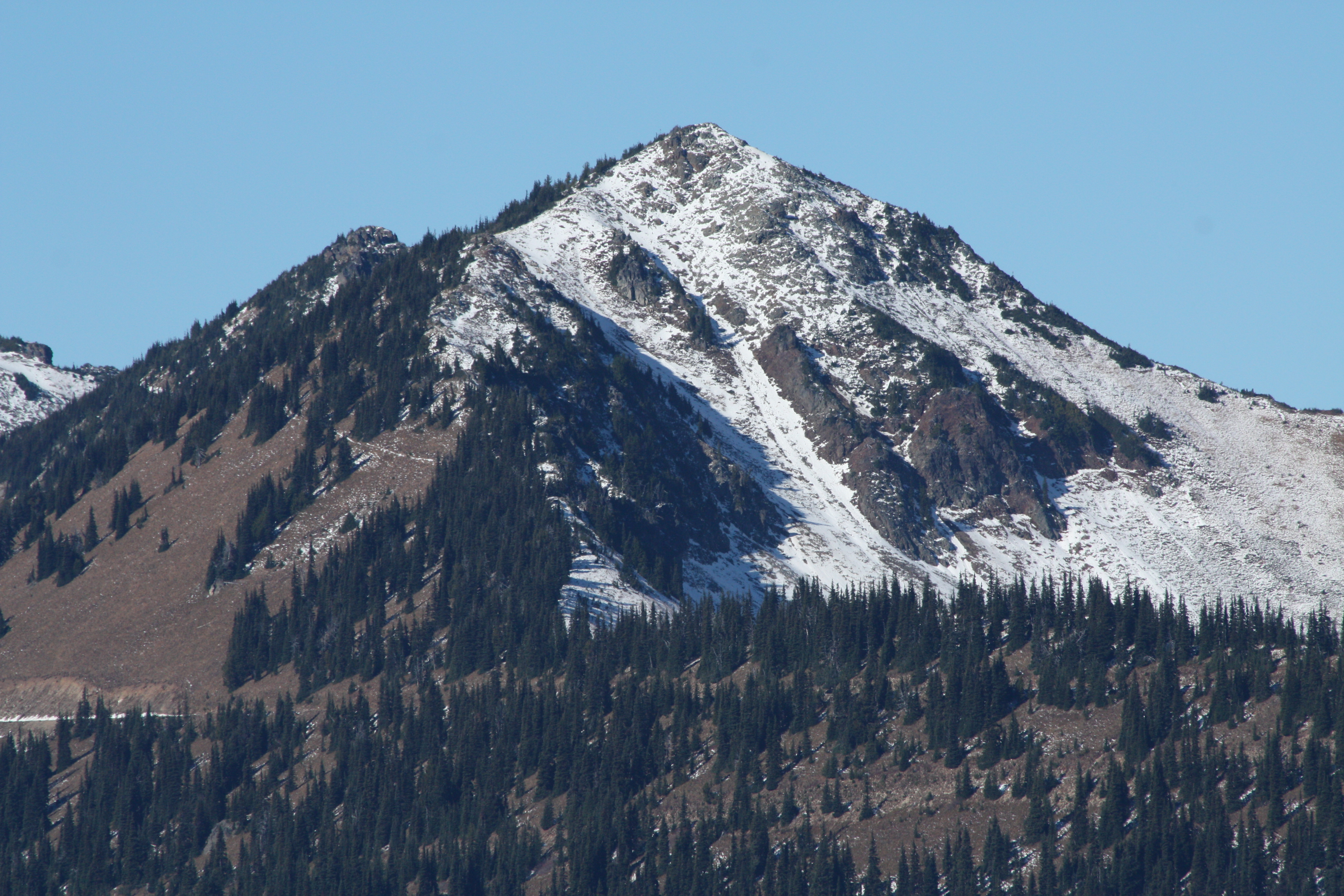
Dege Peak

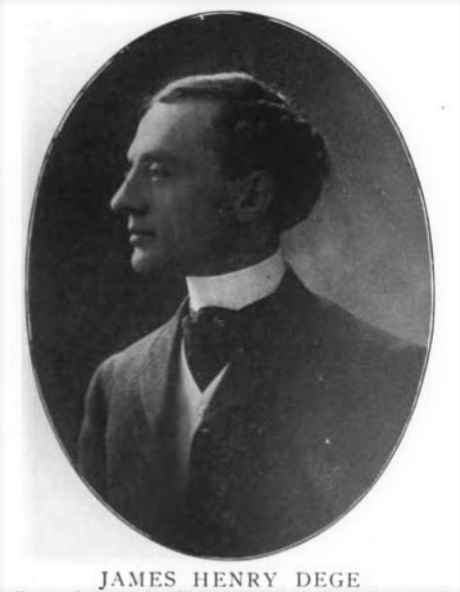
James Henry Dege

== See also ==
- Geology of the Pacific Northwest
