= Gobbler's Knob Fire Lookout =

- U.S. National Register of Historic Places
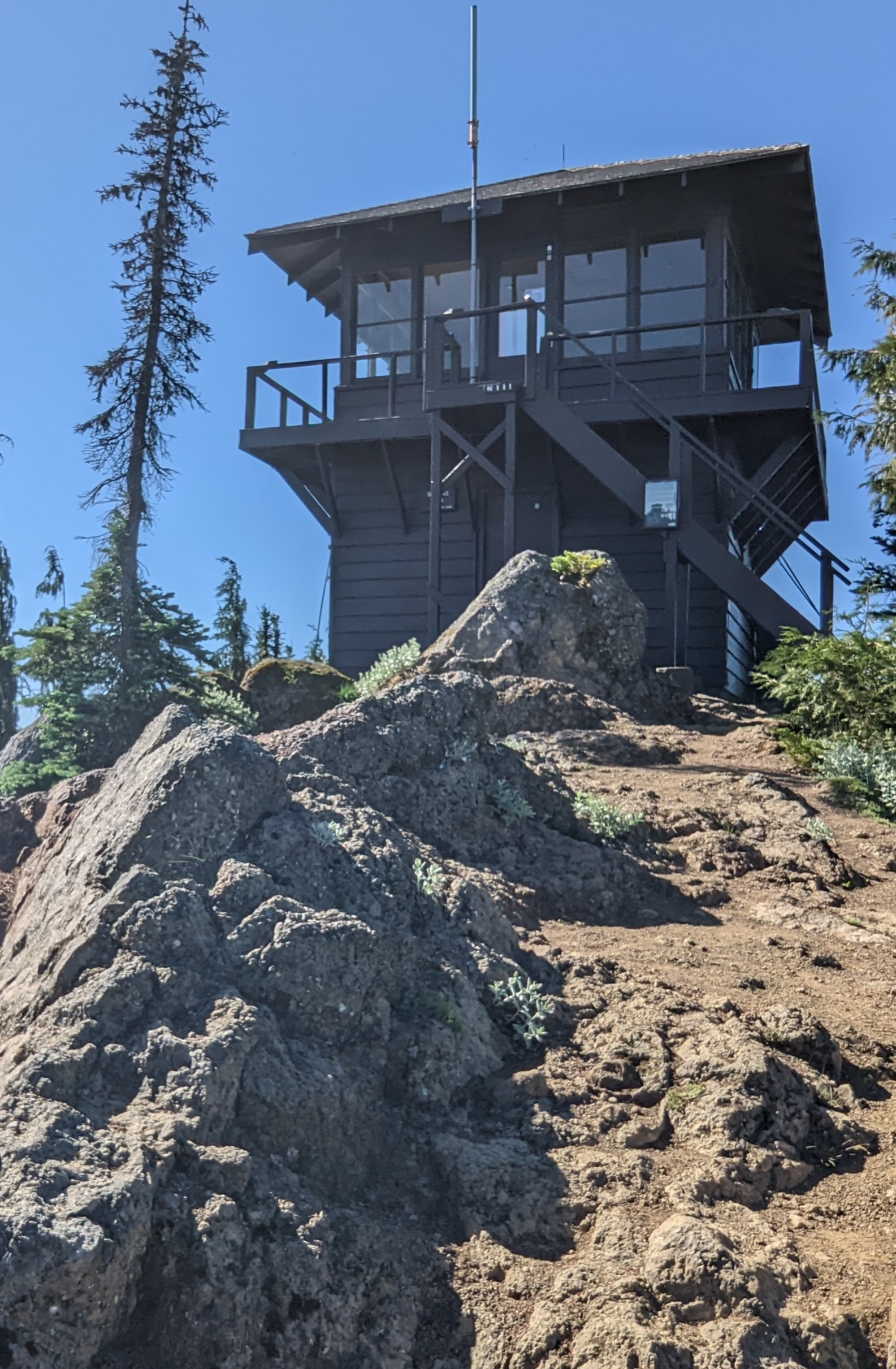
- Gobbler's Knob Lookout in summer 2022

- Location within Washington (state)
- Nearest city: Nisqually Entrance, Washington
- Coordinates: 46°47′39″N 121°54′48″W
- Area: less than one acre
- Built: 1933
- Architectural style: Rustic style
- MPS: Mt. Rainier National Park MPS
- NRHP reference No.: 91000191
- Added to NRHP: March 13, 1991

The Gobbler's Knob Fire Lookout is a fire lookout tower in the extreme western region of Mount Rainier National Park at an elevation of 5,485 feet (1,672 m). One of four fire lookouts remaining in the park, the lookout is used for visitor services during summer weekends. The building is about 14 feet (4.3 m) by 14 feet (4.3 m), and was designed by the National Park Service Branch of Plans and designs under the supervision of Acting Chief Architect Edwin A. Nickel. It was built in 1933. The two-story structure features a balconied lookout on the second level, with storage on the ground level. Cables secured to deadmen keep the lookout from blowing over. The lookout was extensively damaged in a 2006 storm, along with Mount Fremont Fire Lookout, with both since being repaired.

The lookout was placed on the National Register of Historic Places on March 13, 1991. It is part of the Mount Rainier National Historic Landmark District, which encompasses the entire park and which recognizes the park's inventory of Park Service-designed rustic architecture.

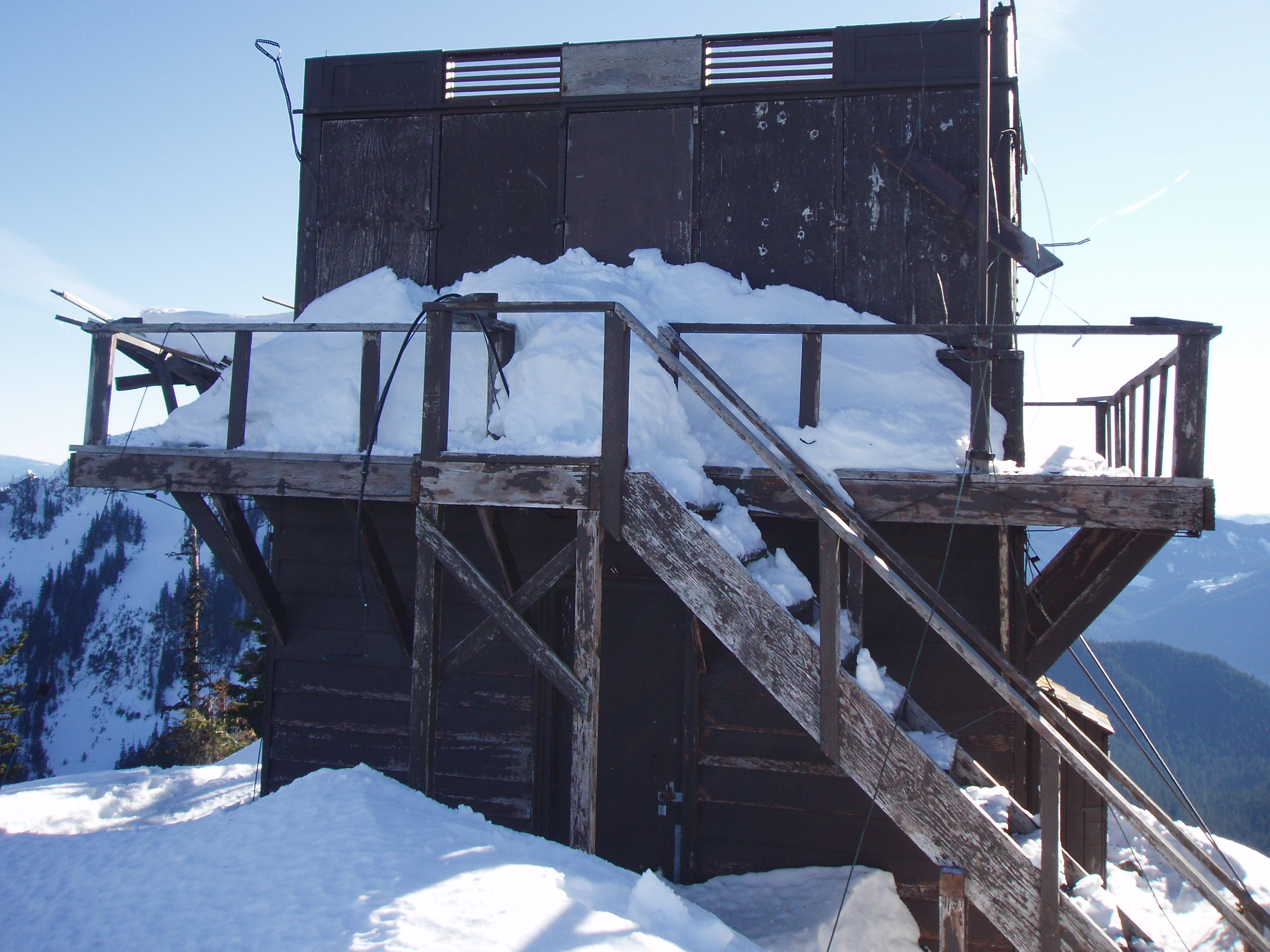
Gobbler's Knob Lookout with 2006 storm damage, since repaired

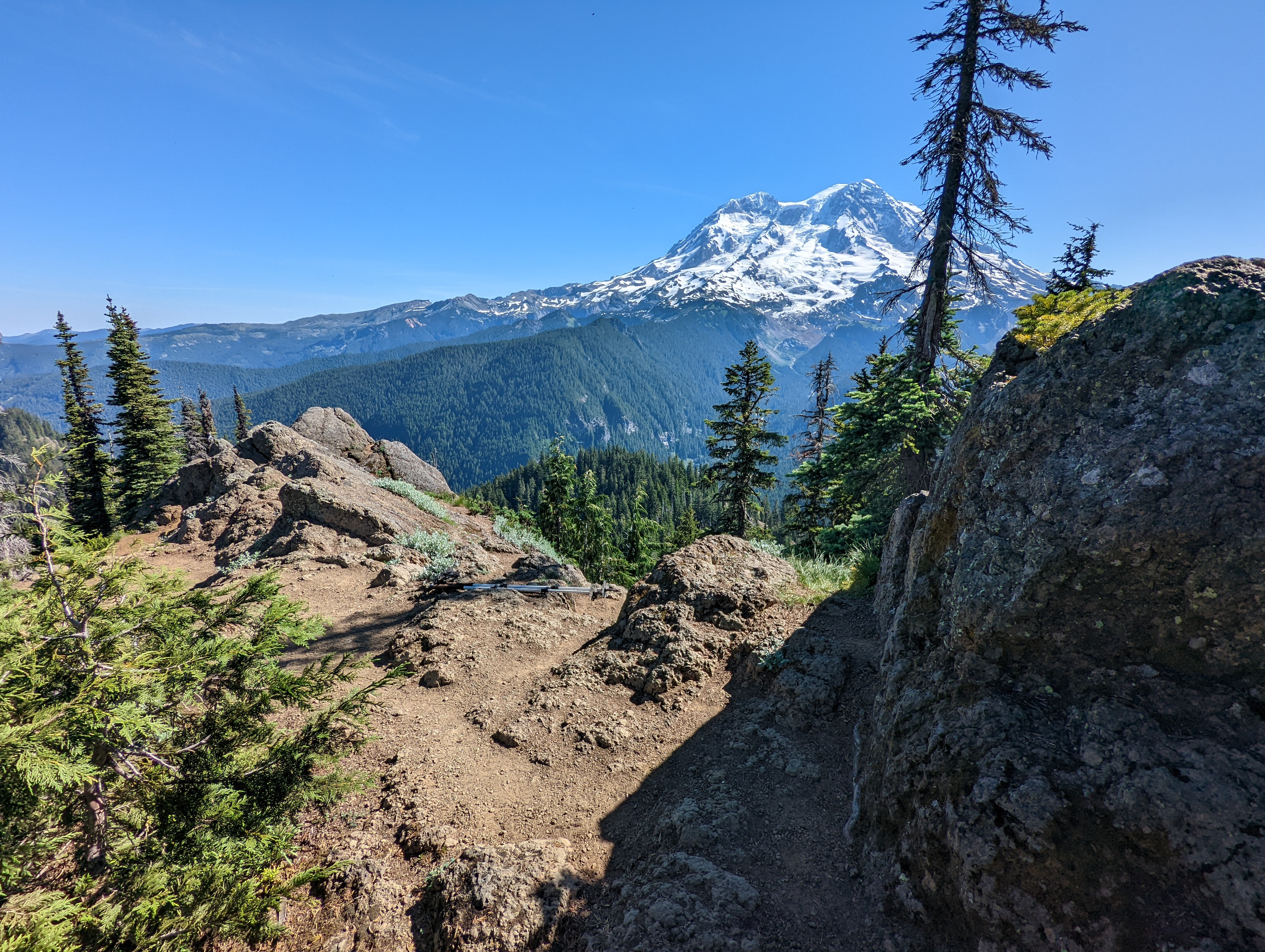
The southwest face of Mt. Rainier as viewed from the summit of Gobbler's Knob
