= Fryingpan Glacier =

Glacier in the United States

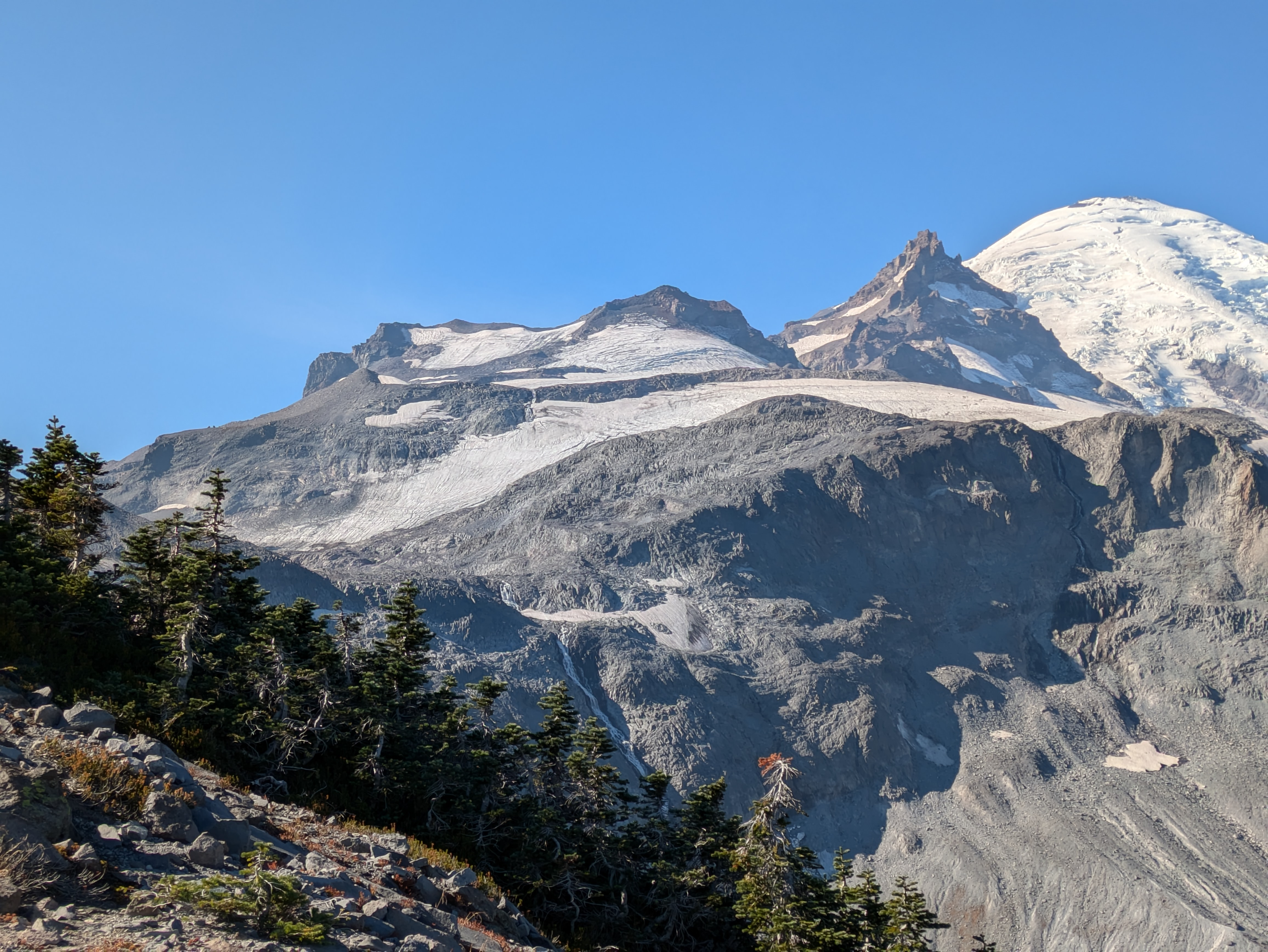
- Fryingpan Glacier in front and to the left of Little Tahoma, October 2024

- Location within Washington (state)
- Type: Mountain glacier
- Location: Little Tahoma Peak, Mount Rainier National Park, Pierce County, Washington, USA
- Coordinates: 46°50′32″N 121°41′27″W
- Length: 1.10 mi (1.77 km)
- Terminus: Icefall
- Status: Retreating

Fryingpan Glacier is on the eastern face of the 11,138-foot (3,395 m) Little Tahoma Peak, just to the east of Mount Rainier in the U.S. state of Washington. The glacier is located on top of a cliff from the Emmons Glacier to the north and a small ridge separates this glacier from the Whitman Glacier to the south, except for a small snowfield in which these two glaciers are connected. Most of the ice is located on a broad plateau at an elevation of 8,000 to 8,600 feet (2,400 to 2,600 m). The head of the Fryingpan Glacier is located to the northeast of the ridge and at the foothill of Little Tahoma Peak at around 9,100 to 9,800 feet (2,800 to 3,000 m). The glacier flows downhill eastward and the uneven topography causes the glacier surface to be crevassed The glacier ends on shallow to steep slopes at about 7,100 to 7,500 feet (2,200 to 2,300 m). Numerous snowfields and alpine meadows are located near the bottom and east of the glacier. Meltwater from the glacier drains into the White River.

== See also ==
- List of glaciers in the United States
