= Mount Fremont Fire Lookout =

- Mt. Fremont Fire Lookout
- U.S. National Register of Historic Places
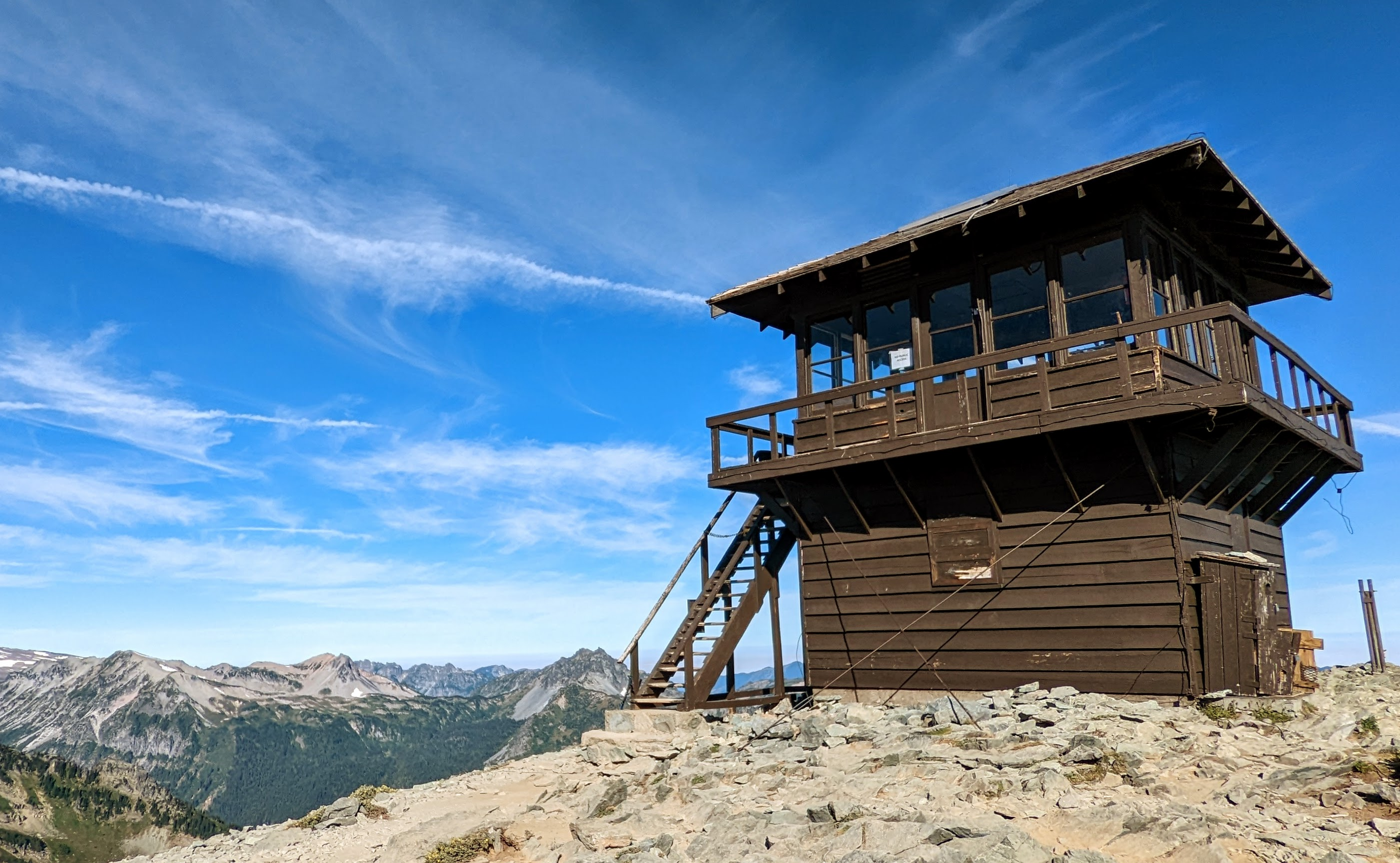
- Mount Fremont Fire Lookout in summer 2022

- Location within Washington (state)
- Nearest city: Sunrise, Washington
- Coordinates: 46°56′2″N 121°40′28″W
- Area: less than one acre
- Built: 1934
- Architectural style: Rustic style
- MPS: Mt. Rainier National Park MPS
- NRHP reference No.: 91000193
- Added to NRHP: March 13, 1991

The Mount Fremont Fire Lookout is a fire lookout in the northern region of Mount Rainier National Park at an elevation above 7,000 feet (2,100 m), the highest in the park. One of four fire lookouts remaining in the park, the lookout is used for visitor services during summer weekends. The building is about 14 by 14 feet (4.3 by 4.3 m), and was designed by the National Park Service Branch of Plans and designs under the supervision of Acting Chief Architect Edwin A. Nickel. It was built in 1933. The two-story structure features a balconied lookout on the second level, with storage on the ground level. Cables secured to deadmen keep the lookout from blowing over. The Park Service was assisted during construction by the Emergency Conservation Works Association. The lookout was extensively damaged in a 2006 storm, along with the park's Gobbler's Knob Fire Lookout. They've since been repaired.

The lookout was placed on the National Register of Historic Places on March 13, 1991. It is part of the Mount Rainier National Historic Landmark District, which encompasses the entire park and which recognizes the park's inventory of Park Service-designed rustic architecture.

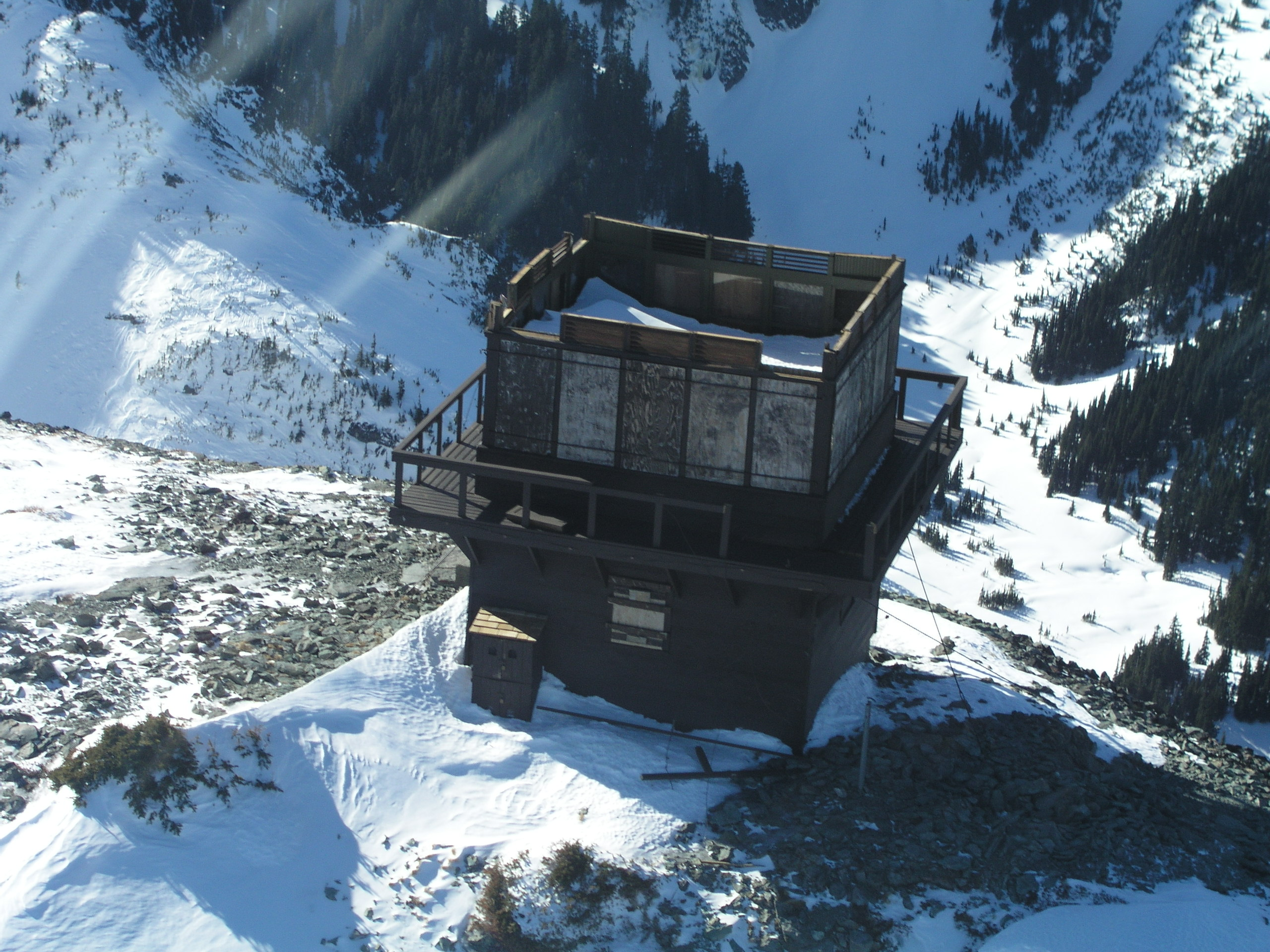
A roofless Mount Fremont Fire Lookout following the 2006 storm damage, since repaired

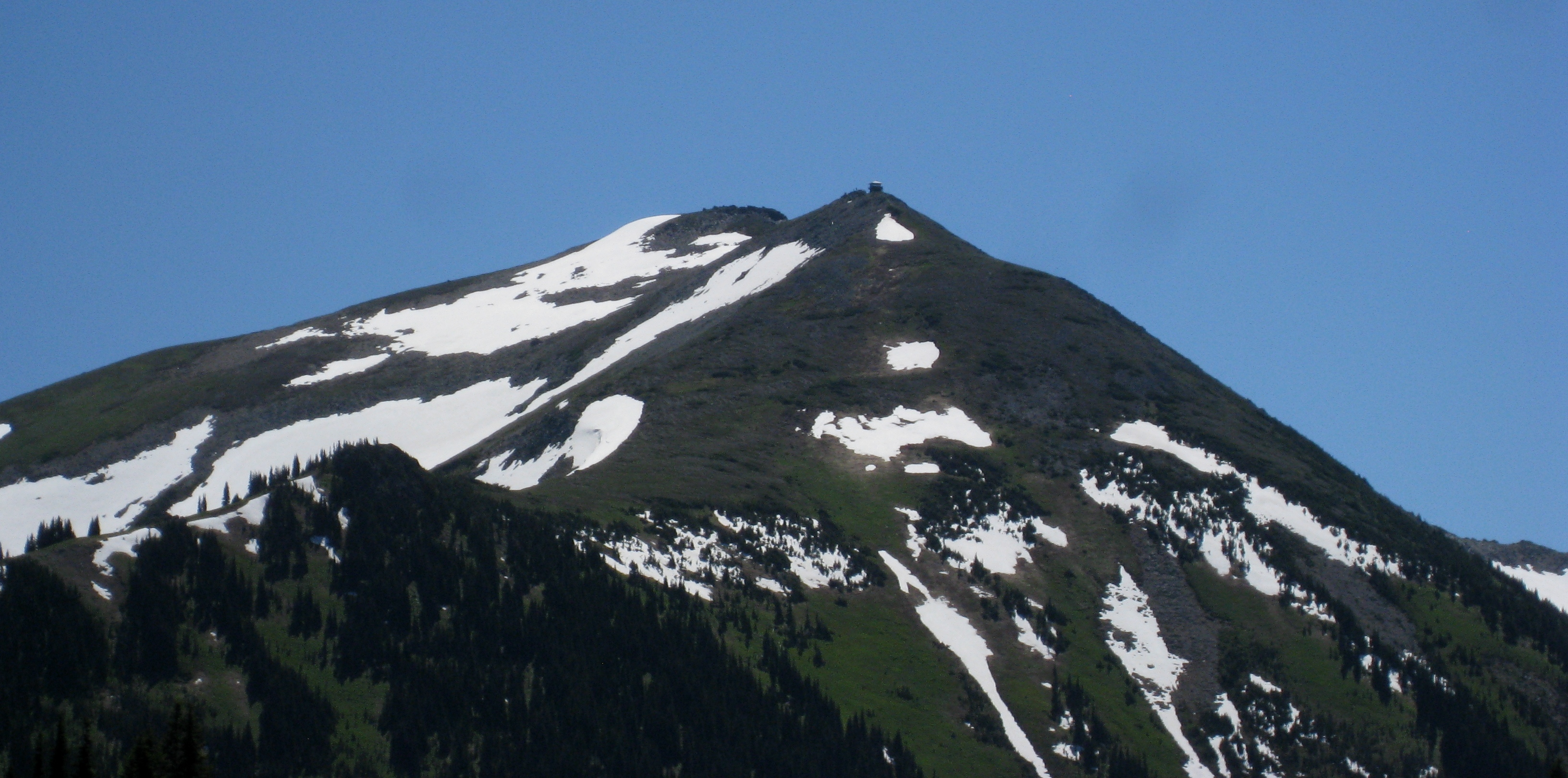
Fremont Fire Lookout as viewed from Grand Park
