= Whitman Glacier =

Glacier in Washington, United States

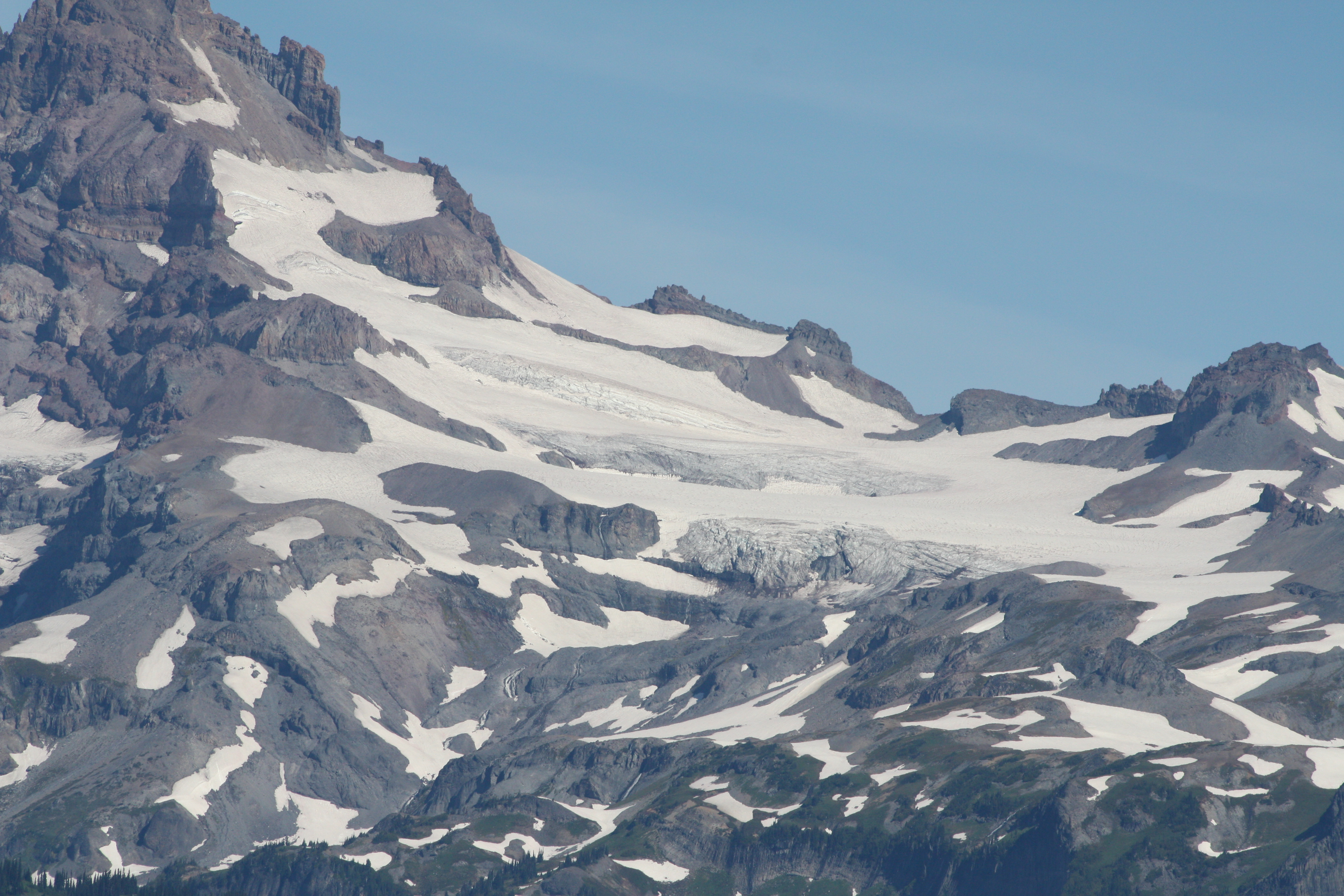
- Interactive map of Whitman Glacier
- Type: Mountain glacier
- Location: Little Tahoma Peak, Mount Rainier National Park, Pierce County, Washington, United States
- Coordinates: 46°50′31″N 121°41′41″W
- Area: 0.9 square miles (2.3 km^{2}), 1983

The Whitman Glacier is a medium-sized glacier on the eastern flank of Little Tahoma Peak, a sub-peak of Mount Rainier in Washington. Named for the missionary Marcus Whitman, it covers 0.9 square miles (2.3 km^{2}) and contains 4.4 billion ft^{3} (125 million m^{3}) of ice. Starting from near the rocky spire of Little Tahoma at 10,000 feet (3,000 m), the glacier flows southeast downhill. A small snowfield connects this glacier with the adjacent Fryingpan Glacier at about 9,200 feet (2,800 m). As the Whitman Glacier flows southeast, the Whitman Crest bounds the glacier to the northeast. Upon reaching a flatter plateau at about 8,300 feet (2,500 m), the glacier does not flow far before reaching its terminus at 8,200 feet (2,500 m) to 7,800 ft (2,400 m). The small Ohanapecosh Glacier lies east of the terminus. Meltwater from the glacier drains into the Cowlitz River.

== See also ==
- List of glaciers
