= Mount Fremont =

Mountain in Washington (state), United States

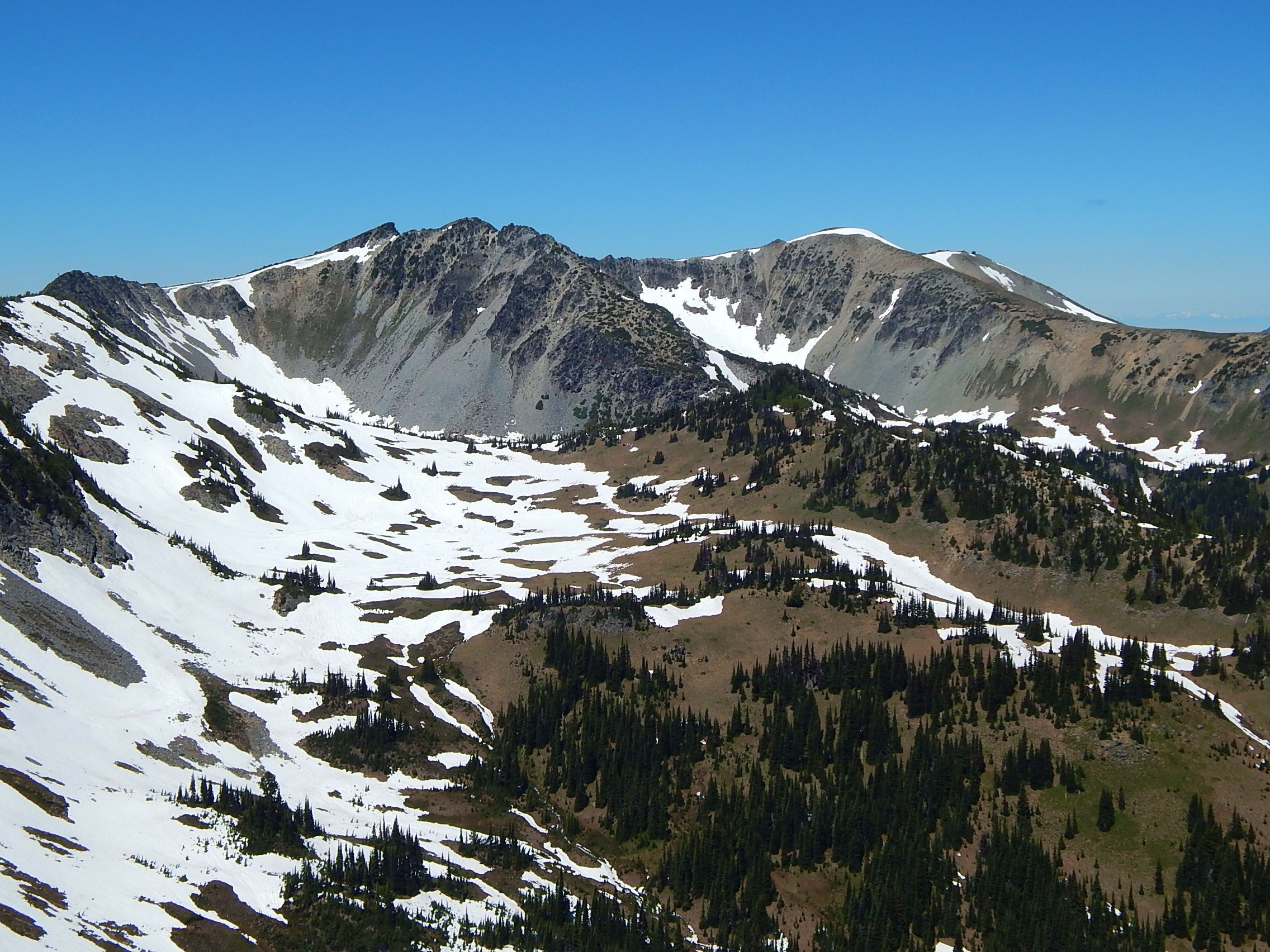
- Mount Fremont, background left of center, seen from the east

Highest point
- Elevation: 7,214 ft (2,199 m)
- Prominence: 94 ft (29 m)
- Parent peak: Mount Fremont North (7,317 ft)
- Isolation: 0.32 mi (0.51 km)
- Coordinates: 46°55′24″N 121°40′00″W

Geography
- Location within Washington (state) Location within the United States
- Country: United States
- State: Washington
- County: Pierce
- Protected area: Mount Rainier National Park
- Parent range: Cascades; Sourdough Mountains
- Topo map: USGS Sunrise

Climbing
- Easiest route: class 3 scrambling

Mount Fremont is a 7,214-foot-elevation (2,199 m) mountain summit located in Mount Rainier National Park in Pierce County of Washington state. Mount Fremont is a minor peak at the southwest corner of the Sourdough Mountains which are a subset of the Cascade Range. It also the juncture for a small ridge of peaks of similar size running to the northeast. Mount Fremont is situated northwest of the Sunrise Historic District, with a popular trail leading to the Mount Fremont Fire Lookout. However, this trail does not reach the true summit which is 0.25 mi (0.40 km) north of Frozen Lake. Peak 7317, also known as Mount Fremont North, located 0.31 mi (0.50 km) west-northwest along the ridge is its nearest higher neighbor. Access is limited by snowpack closing the Sunrise Road much of the year. July, August, and September are typically the months when the Sunrise Road is seasonally open for vehicle traffic. Precipitation runoff from Mount Fremont drains into the White River.

== Climate ==
Mount Fremont is located in the marine west coast climate zone of western North America. Most weather fronts originating in the Pacific Ocean travel northeast toward the Cascade Mountains. As fronts approach, they are forced upward by the peaks of the Cascade Range (orographic lift), causing them to drop their moisture in the form of rain or snow onto the Cascades. As a result, the west side of the Cascades experiences high precipitation, especially during the winter months in the form of snowfall. Because of maritime influence, snow tends to be wet and heavy, resulting in high avalanche danger. During winter months, weather is usually cloudy, but due to high pressure systems over the Pacific Ocean that intensify during summer months, there is often little or no cloud cover during the summer.

== History ==
Mount Fremont honors John C. Frémont (1813-1890), who was an American explorer, politician, and soldier. His explorations of the Oregon Territory stimulated the American desire to own that region. His journals recorded that Mount Rainier was erupting in November 1843. This landform's toponym was officially adopted in 1932 by the U.S. Board on Geographic Names.

== See also ==
- Geography of Washington (state)
- Geology of the Pacific Northwest

== Gallery ==
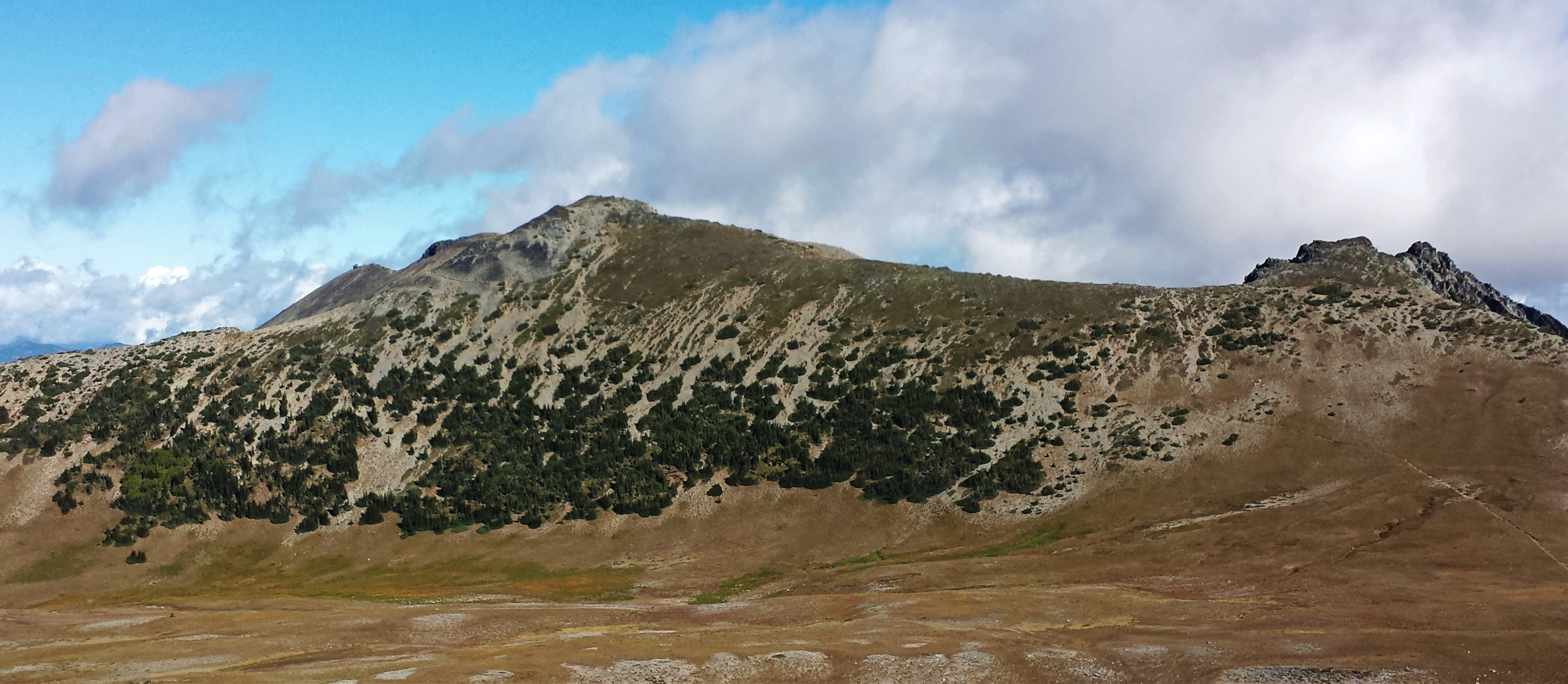
Mt. Fremont, second from far right, from Burroughs Mountain

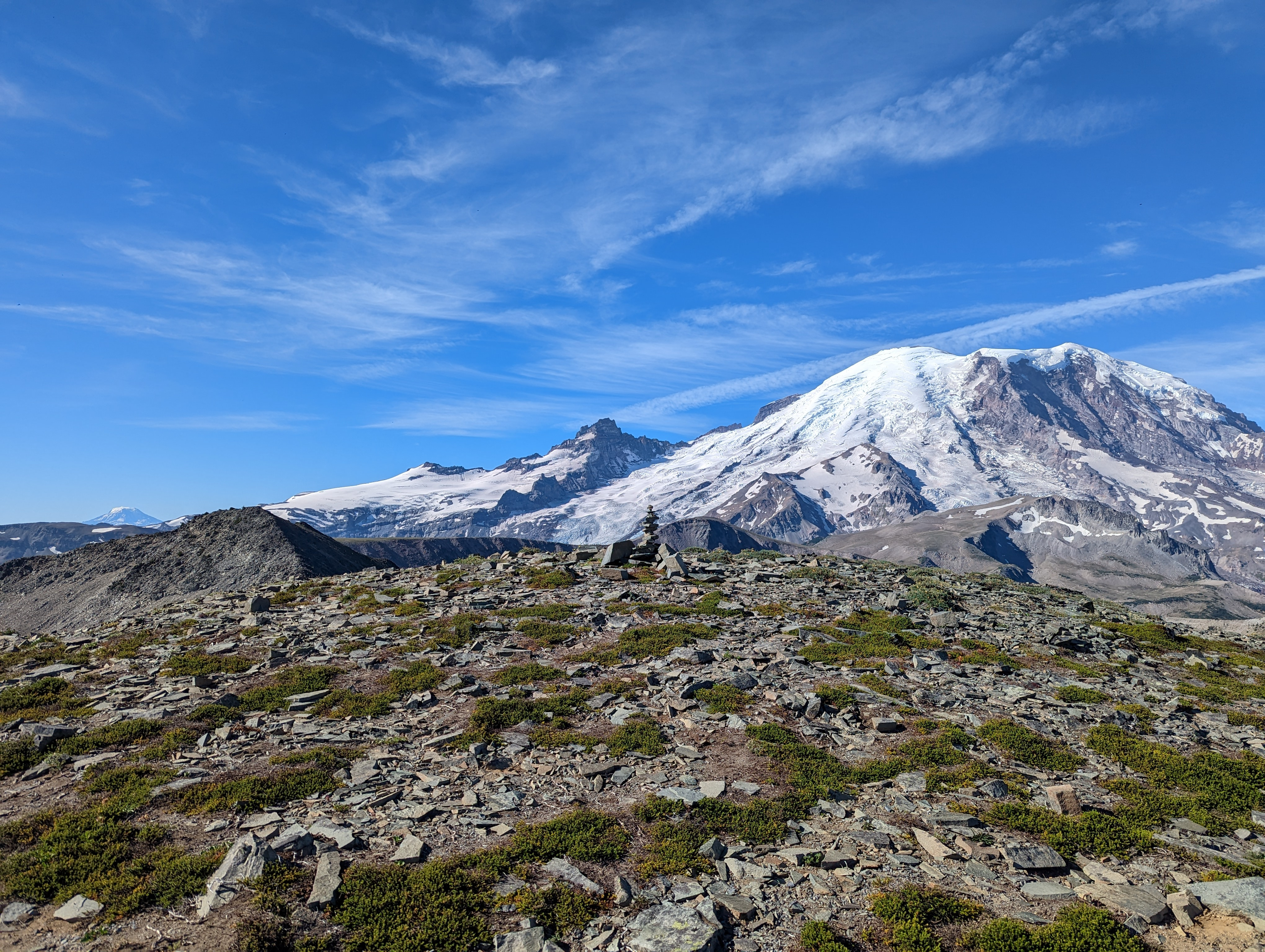
On Peak 7291 en route to Peak 7317 (left)
