= Little Tahoma Peak =

Subpeak of Mount Rainier

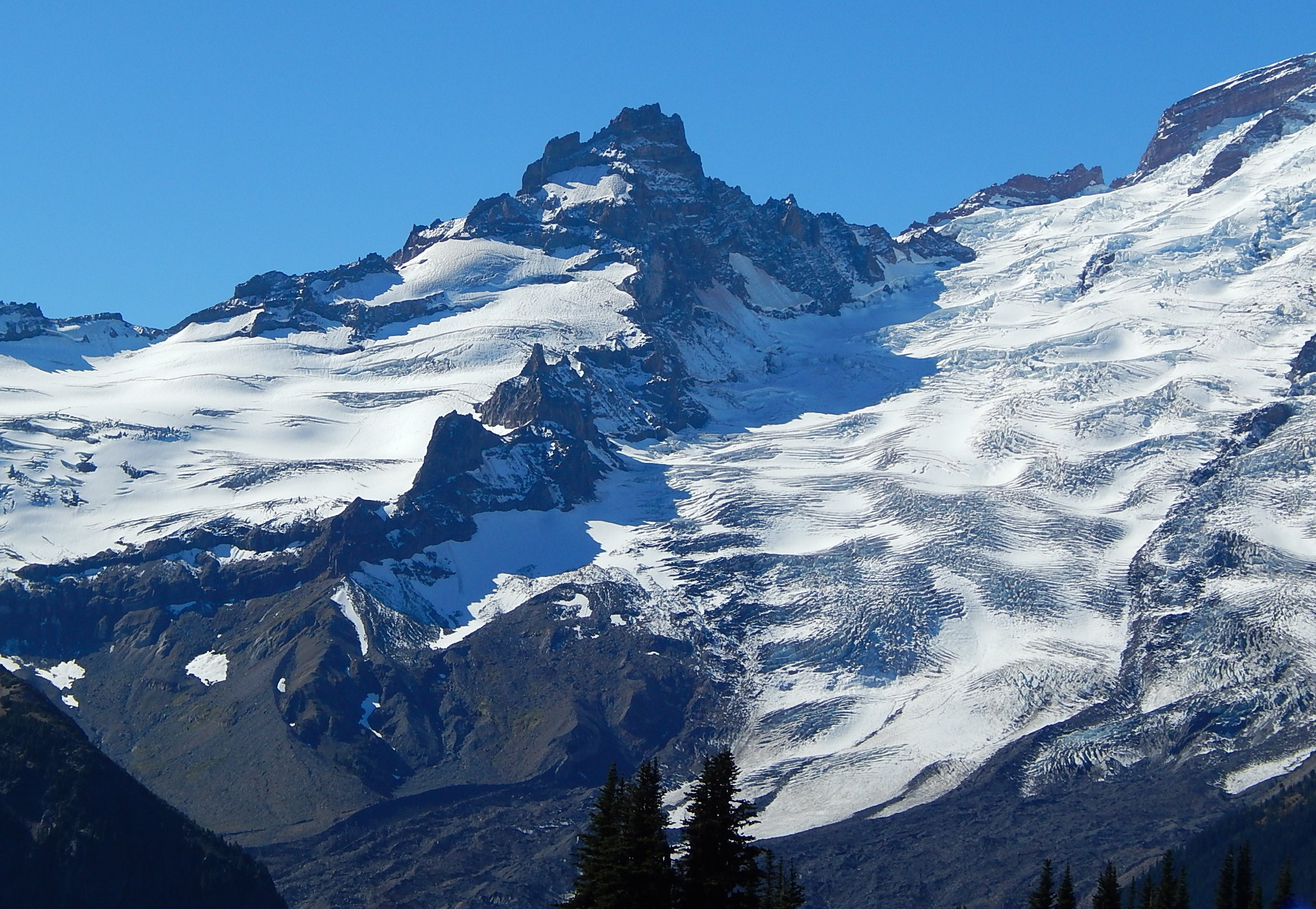
- View from Sunrise, from the northeast

Highest point
- Elevation: 11,138 ft (3,395 m)
- Prominence: 818 ft (249 m)
- Coordinates: 46°50′58″N 121°42′44″W

Geography
- Location: Mount Rainier National Park, Pierce County, Washington, U.S.
- Parent range: Cascades
- Topo map: USGS Mount Rainier East

Geology
- Rock age: Less than 500,000 years
- Mountain type: Andesitic stratovolcanic remnant
- Volcanic arc: Cascade Volcanic Arc

Climbing
- First ascent: 1894 by JB Flett and Henry H. Garrison
- Easiest route: Rock & Ice climb

Little Tahoma Peak, also called Little Tahoma, is a satellite peak of Mount Rainier in Pierce County, Washington and in Mount Rainier National Park. It is quite noticeable from Seattle over 60 miles (97 km) away.

Little Tahoma Peak is a volcanic remnant. It was part of a larger Mount Rainier which has eroded. The rock is quite unstable and in 1963 a large avalanche originating below it covered the lower section of Emmons Glacier with rock debris. The Fryingpan Glacier and Whitman Glacier are located just to the east of the peak.

Little Tahoma Peak can most easily be accessed from Summerland, an alpine meadow area in Mount Rainier National Park. The first recorded ascent was on August 29, 1894, by JB Flett and Henry H. Garrison who climbed from Summerland using the east shoulder.

If considered on its own, Little Tahoma would be the third-highest peak in Washington.

== Gallery ==
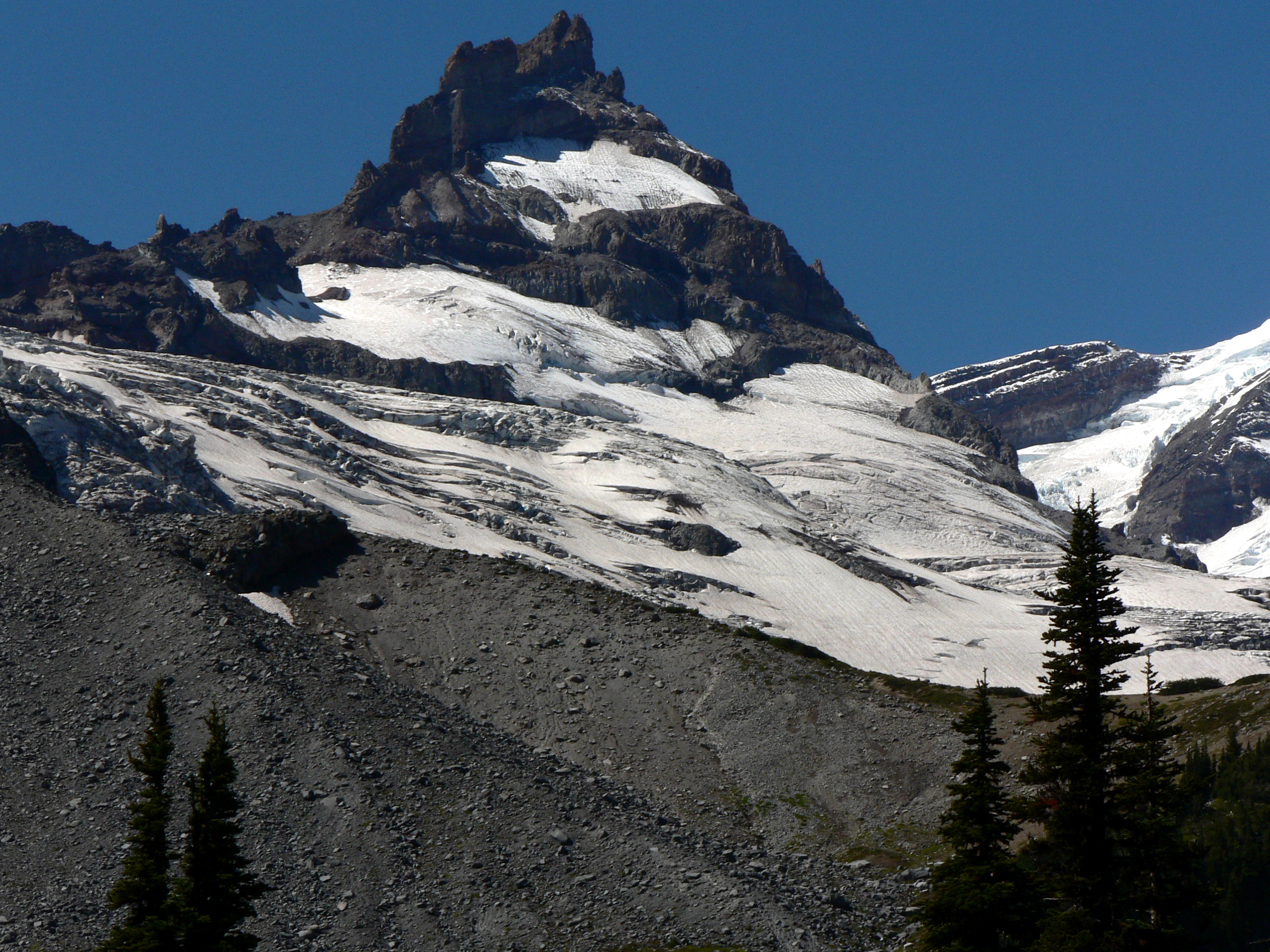
from Summerland to the east-northeast

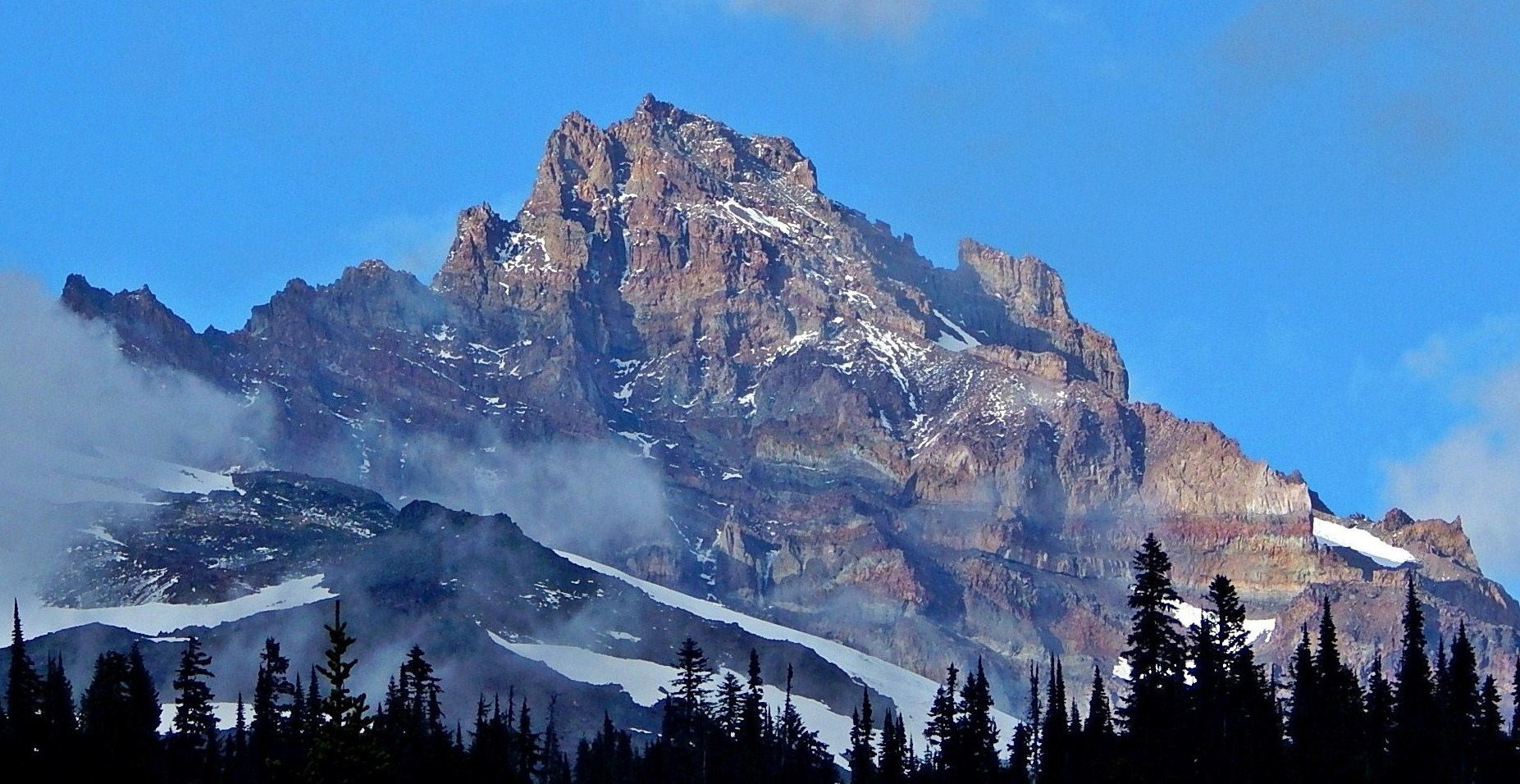
from the south

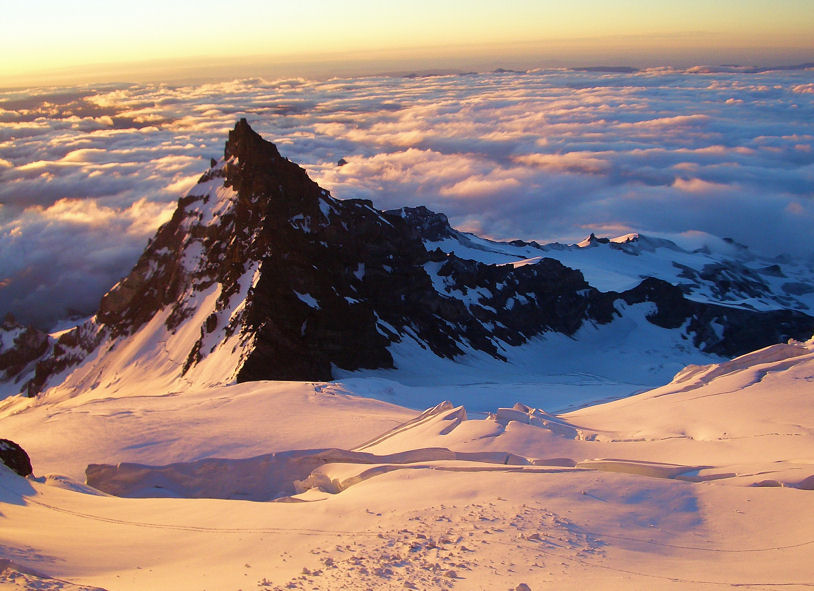
from Disappointment Cleaver route to the west

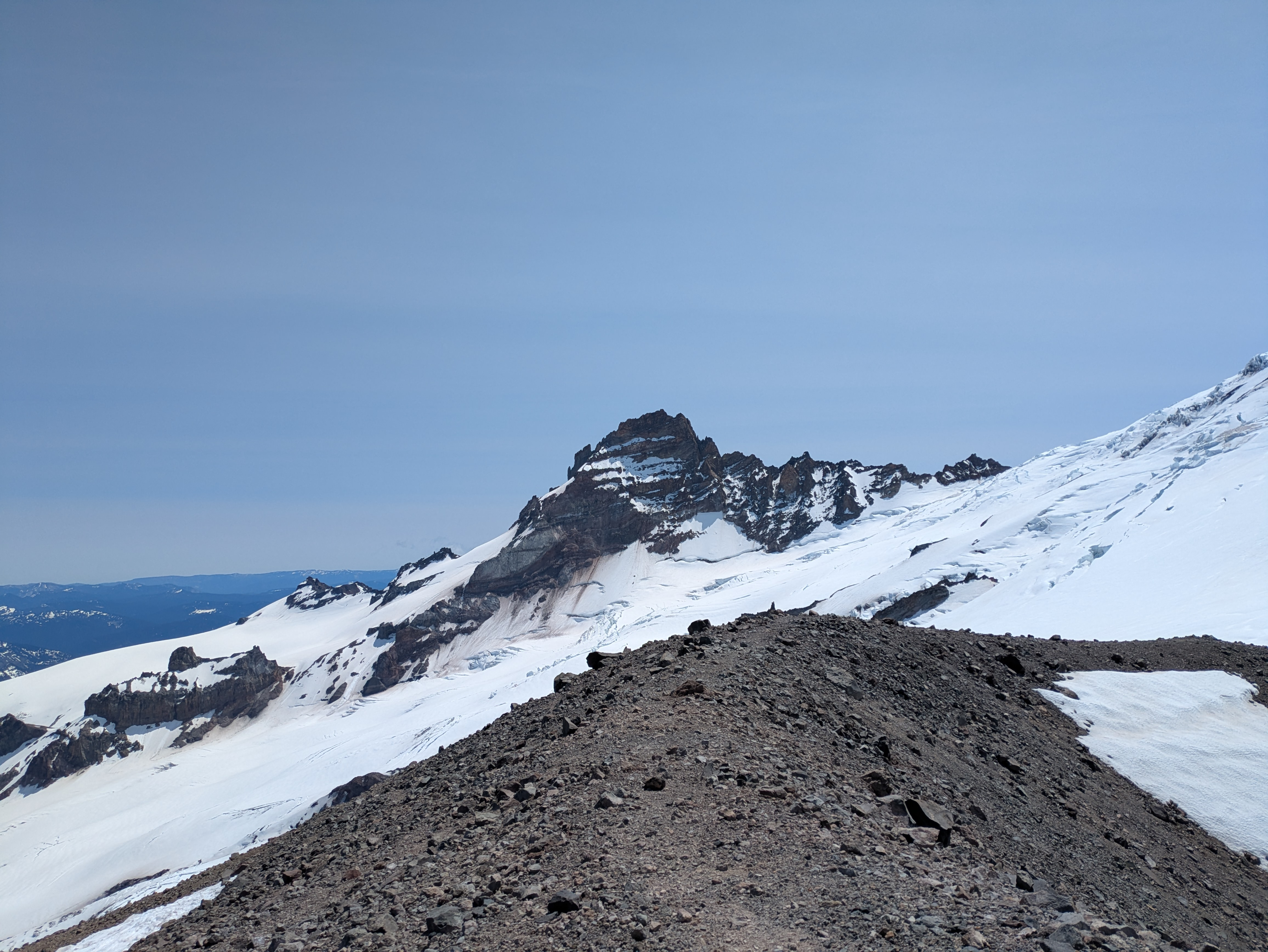
from Steamboat Prow to the north

== Climate ==
The summit of Little Tahoma has a Tundra climate, with severely cold winters and cool summers.

Climate data for Little Tahoma Peak 46.8496 N, 121.7103 W, Elevation: 10,007 ft (3,050 m) (1991–2020 normals)
| Month | Jan | Feb | Mar | Apr | May | Jun | Jul | Aug | Sep | Oct | Nov | Dec | Year |
|---|---|---|---|---|---|---|---|---|---|---|---|---|---|
| Mean daily maximum °F (°C) | 22.0 (−5.6) | 21.4 (−5.9) | 22.2 (−5.4) | 26.2 (−3.2) | 34.9 (1.6) | 41.2 (5.1) | 51.5 (10.8) | 52.1 (11.2) | 47.1 (8.4) | 36.8 (2.7) | 25.1 (−3.8) | 20.6 (−6.3) | 33.4 (0.8) |
| Daily mean °F (°C) | 16.7 (−8.5) | 14.7 (−9.6) | 14.5 (−9.7) | 17.3 (−8.2) | 24.9 (−3.9) | 30.6 (−0.8) | 39.5 (4.2) | 40.0 (4.4) | 35.8 (2.1) | 27.6 (−2.4) | 19.3 (−7.1) | 15.6 (−9.1) | 24.7 (−4.0) |
| Mean daily minimum °F (°C) | 11.4 (−11.4) | 8.1 (−13.3) | 6.7 (−14.1) | 8.4 (−13.1) | 14.9 (−9.5) | 19.9 (−6.7) | 27.5 (−2.5) | 28.0 (−2.2) | 24.6 (−4.1) | 18.5 (−7.5) | 13.6 (−10.2) | 10.6 (−11.9) | 16.0 (−8.9) |
| Average precipitation inches (mm) | 21.08 (535) | 18.16 (461) | 16.32 (415) | 11.00 (279) | 6.27 (159) | 4.76 (121) | 1.70 (43) | 1.92 (49) | 4.81 (122) | 11.15 (283) | 19.11 (485) | 20.00 (508) | 136.28 (3,460) |
Source: PRISM Climate Group
