= Sourdough Mountains =

Mountain ridge in Mount Rainier National Park, Washington, USA

Coordinates: 46°55′17″N 121°36′47″W

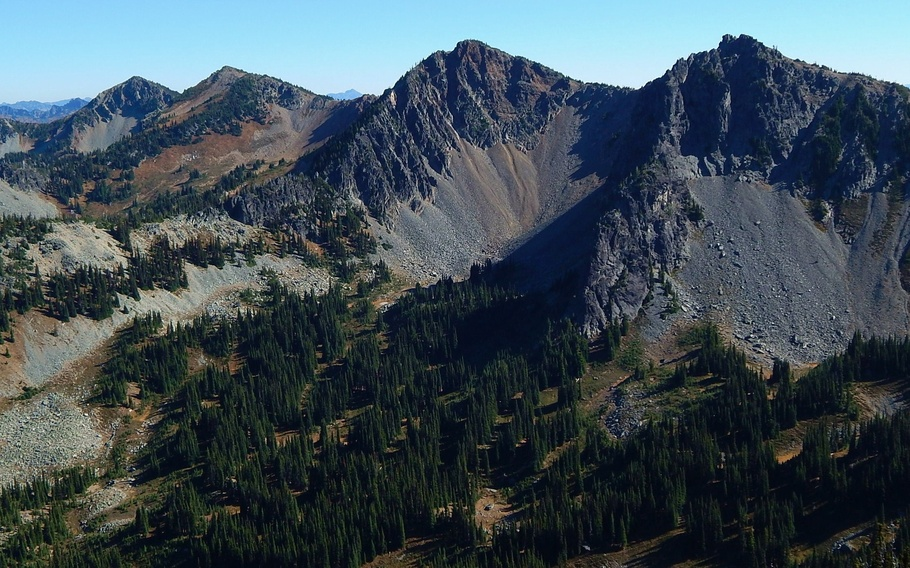
Sourdough Ridge with Antler and Dege peaks seen from McNeeley Peak

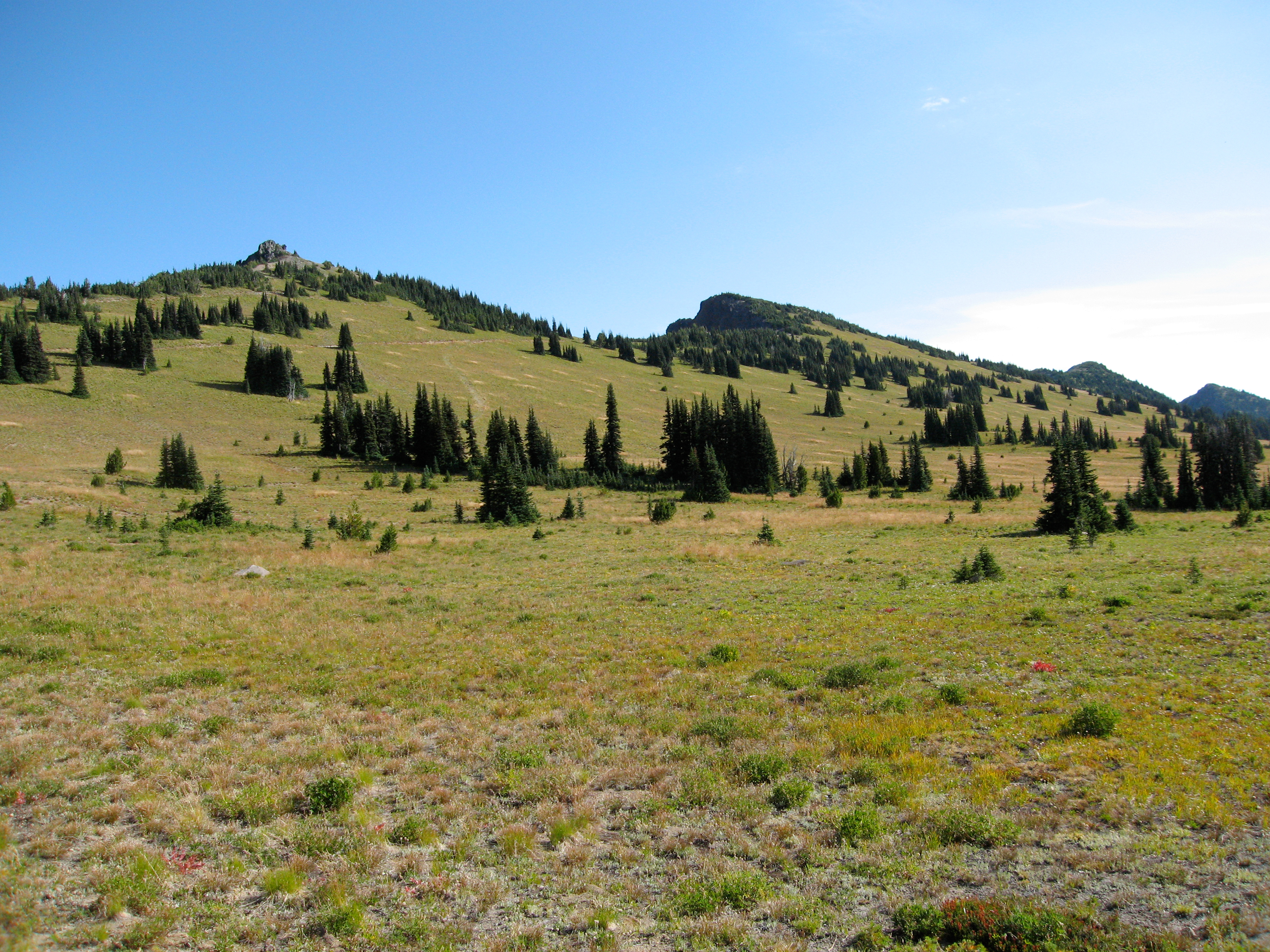
View from the Sunrise lodge area looking northeast. The subalpine meadows of Yakima Park cover the southern slopes of Sourdough Ridge

The Sourdough Mountains, also called Sourdough Ridge, is a mountain ridge on the northeast side of Mount Rainier in Mount Rainier National Park, Washington, United States. The range forms an L-shape, starting at Mount Fremont, running east to Dege Peak, turning north to Slide Mountain.

The ridge is a popular hiking destination, due to the excellent view of Mount Rainier and its proximity to roads and the Sunrise Visitor Center.
