= Crescent Mountain (Washington) =

Mountain in Washington (state), United States

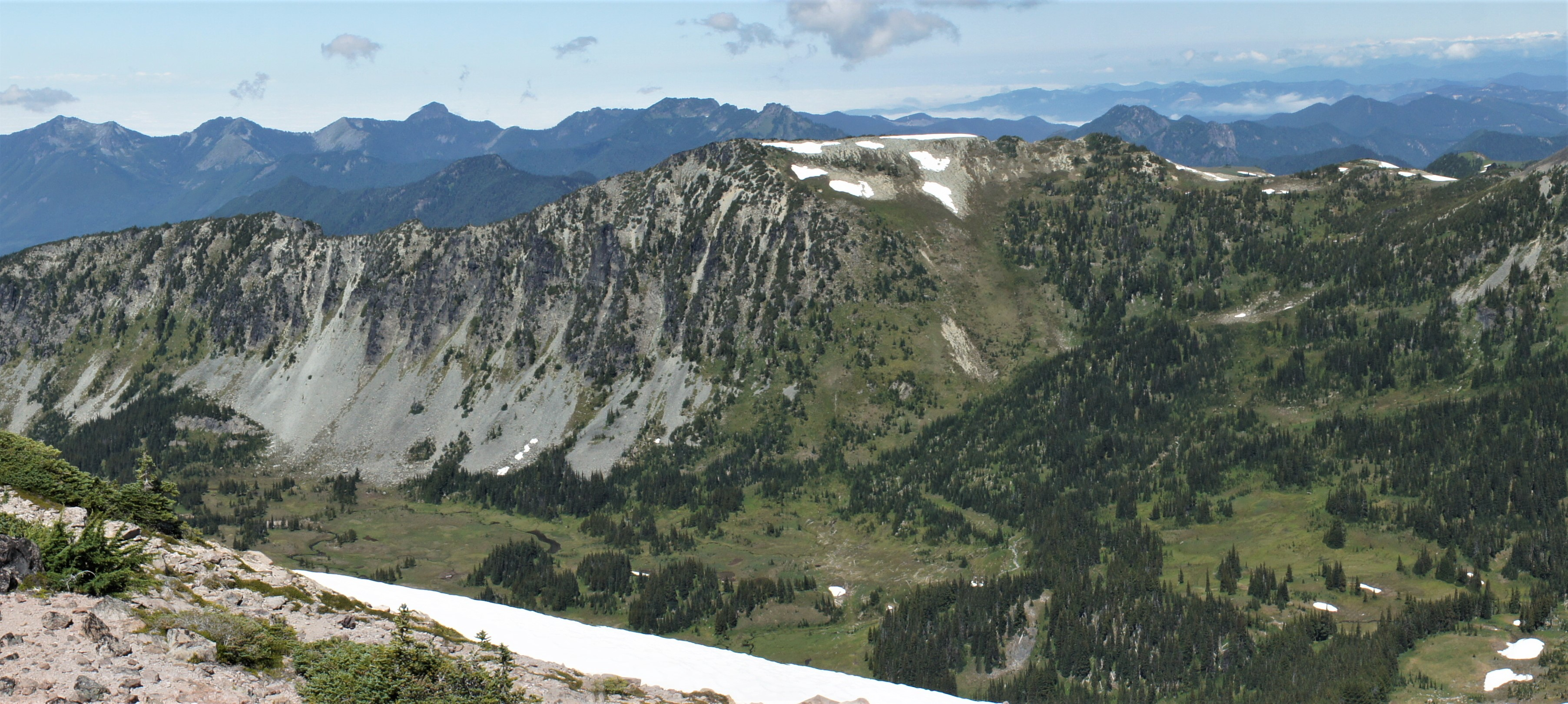
- South aspect, from Old Desolate

Highest point
- Elevation: 6,715 ft (2,047 m)
- Prominence: 275 ft (84 m)
- Parent peak: Sluiskin Mountain (7,026 ft)
- Isolation: 0.85 mi (1.37 km)
- Coordinates: 46°56′53″N 121°45′43″W

Geography
- Location within Washington (state) Location within the United States
- Country: United States
- State: Washington
- County: Pierce
- Protected area: Mount Rainier National Park
- Parent range: Cascades
- Topo map: USGS Mowich Lake

Climbing
- Easiest route: scrambling

Crescent Mountain, a ridge-like peak standing at 6,715 ft (2,047 m), is located in north-central Mount Rainier National Park, in Pierce County of Washington state. It is part of the Cascade Range, and lies 6.6 mi (10.6 km) due north of the summit of Mount Rainier. Sluiskin Mountain is its nearest higher neighbor, 0.85 mi (1.37 km) to the east. Precipitation runoff from Crescent Mountain drains west into tributaries of the Carbon River.

== History ==
The mountain's descriptive name, Crescent, originates from its crescent shape as it envelops Crescent Lake. Geologist Bailey Willis named this feature in 1883. The name was officially adopted in 1932 by the United States Board on Geographic Names.

== Climate ==
Crescent Mountain lies within the marine west coast climate zone of western North America. Most weather fronts originating in the Pacific Ocean move northeast toward the Cascade Mountains. As these fronts approach, they are lifted by the Cascade Range's peaks (orographic lift), resulting in precipitation in the form of rain or snow over the Cascades. As a result, the west side of the Cascades experiences high precipitation, especially during the winter months in the form of snowfall. Due to maritime influence, maritime influences, the snow is typically wet and heavy, posing a significant avalanche risk. During winter months, weather is usually cloudy, but due to high pressure systems over the Pacific Ocean that intensify during summer months, there is often little or no cloud cover during the summer. The months July through September offer the most favorable weather for viewing or climbing this peak.

== See also ==
- Geology of the Pacific Northwest
