= Crescent Mountain =

Crescent Mountain may refer to:

- Crescent Mountain (Washington)
- Crescent Mountain (Oregon)
