= Sluiskin Mountain =

Mountain in Washington (state), United States

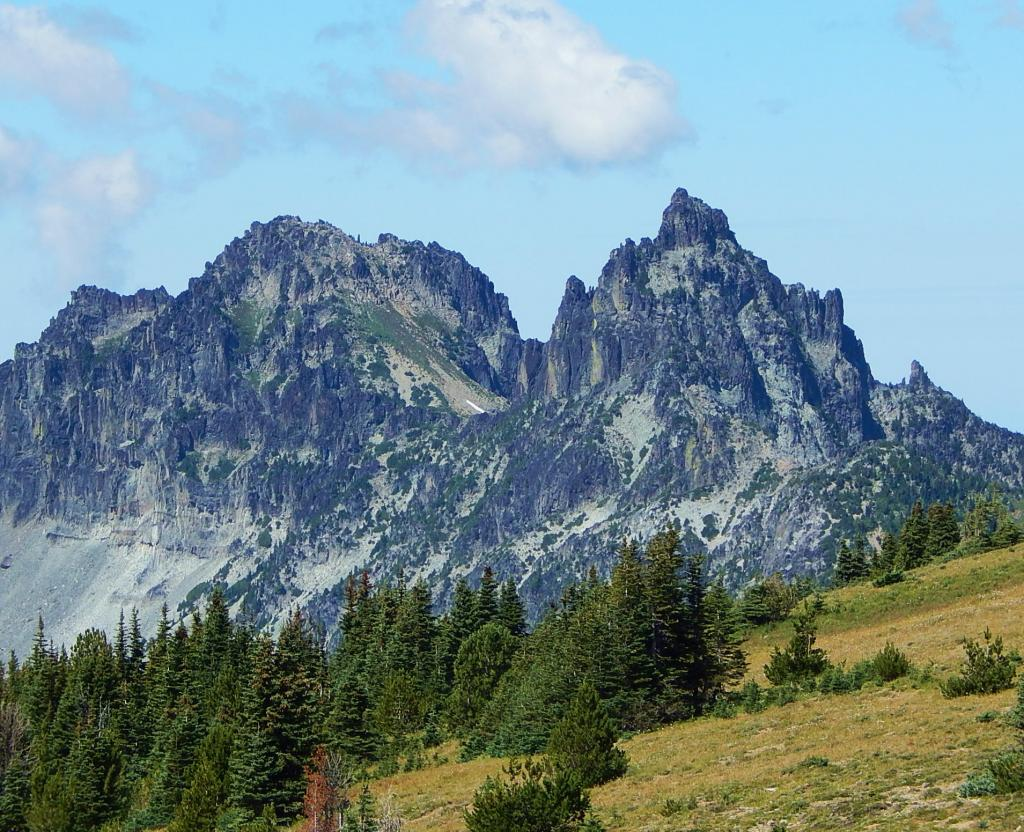
- Sluiskin Mountain seen from near Skyscraper Mountain. The Squaw to left, and The Chief to right.

Highest point
- Elevation: 7,026 ft (2,142 m)
- Prominence: 906 ft (276 m)
- Parent peak: Old Desolate (7,137 ft)
- Isolation: 1.57 mi (2.53 km)
- Coordinates: 46°56′45″N 121°44′17″W

Naming
- Etymology: Sluiskin

Geography
- Location within Washington (state) Location within the United States
- Country: United States
- State: Washington
- County: Pierce
- Protected area: Mount Rainier National Park
- Parent range: Cascades
- Topo map: USGS Sunrise

Climbing
- First ascent: 1909 by The Mountaineers party
- Easiest route: Scrambling class 4

Sluiskin Mountain is a prominent pair of summits located in Mount Rainier National Park in Pierce County of Washington state. It is situated northwest of Burroughs Mountain and is part of the Cascade Range. The higher rocky peak is known as The Chief (7026 ft), and the second peak to the west is known as The Squaw (6960+ ft). West of The Squaw are pinnacles called The Papooses. Sluiskin was the native American guide who assisted with the first successful ascent of Mount Rainier by Hazard Stevens and P. B. Van Trump in 1870. Sluiskin Falls within the park also honors him.

== Climate ==
Sluiskin Mountain is located in the marine west coast climate zone of western North America. Most weather fronts originating in the Pacific Ocean travel northeast toward the Cascade Mountains. As fronts approach, they are forced upward by the peaks of the Cascade Range (orographic lift), causing them to drop their moisture in the form of rain or snow onto the Cascades. As a result, the west side of the Cascades experiences high precipitation, especially during the winter months in the form of snowfall. Because of maritime influence, snow tends to be wet and heavy, resulting in high avalanche danger. During winter months, weather is usually cloudy, but due to high pressure systems over the Pacific Ocean that intensify during summer months, there is often little or no cloud cover during the summer. Precipitation runoff from Sluiskin Mountain drains into tributaries of the White River.

== See also ==
- Geology of the Pacific Northwest

== Gallery ==
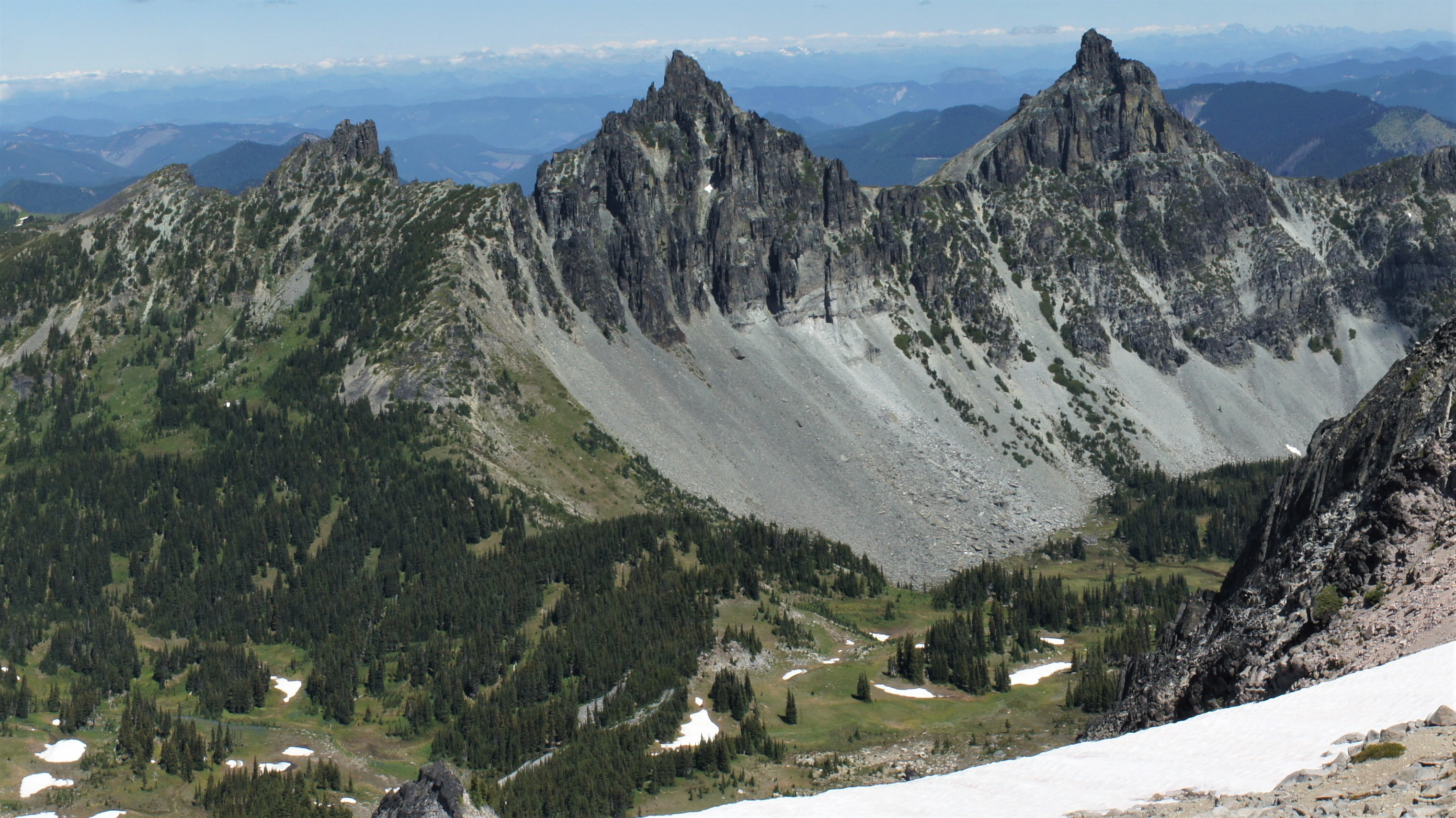
Sluiskin from Old Desolate

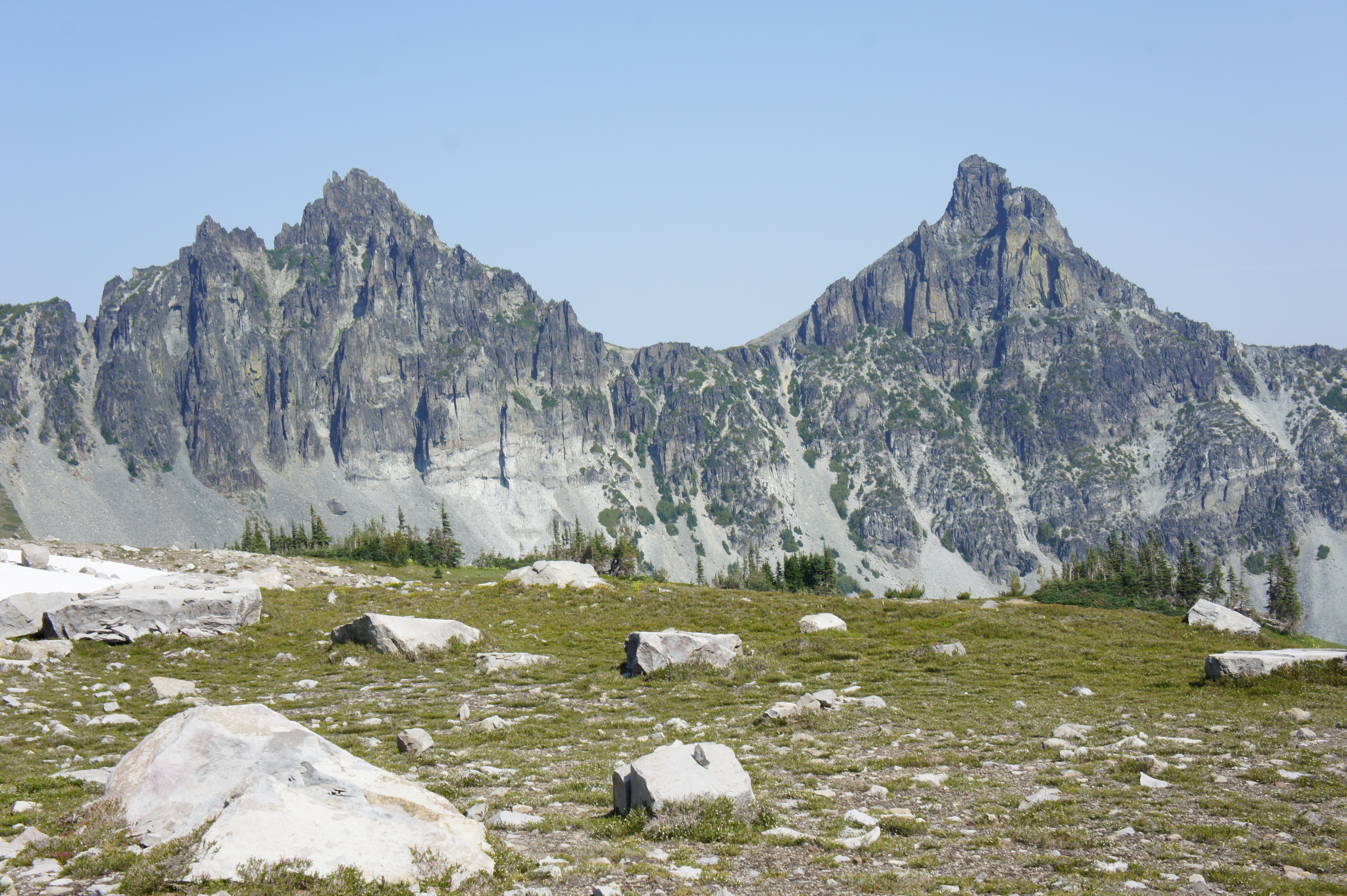
The Squaw (left) and The Chief (right)

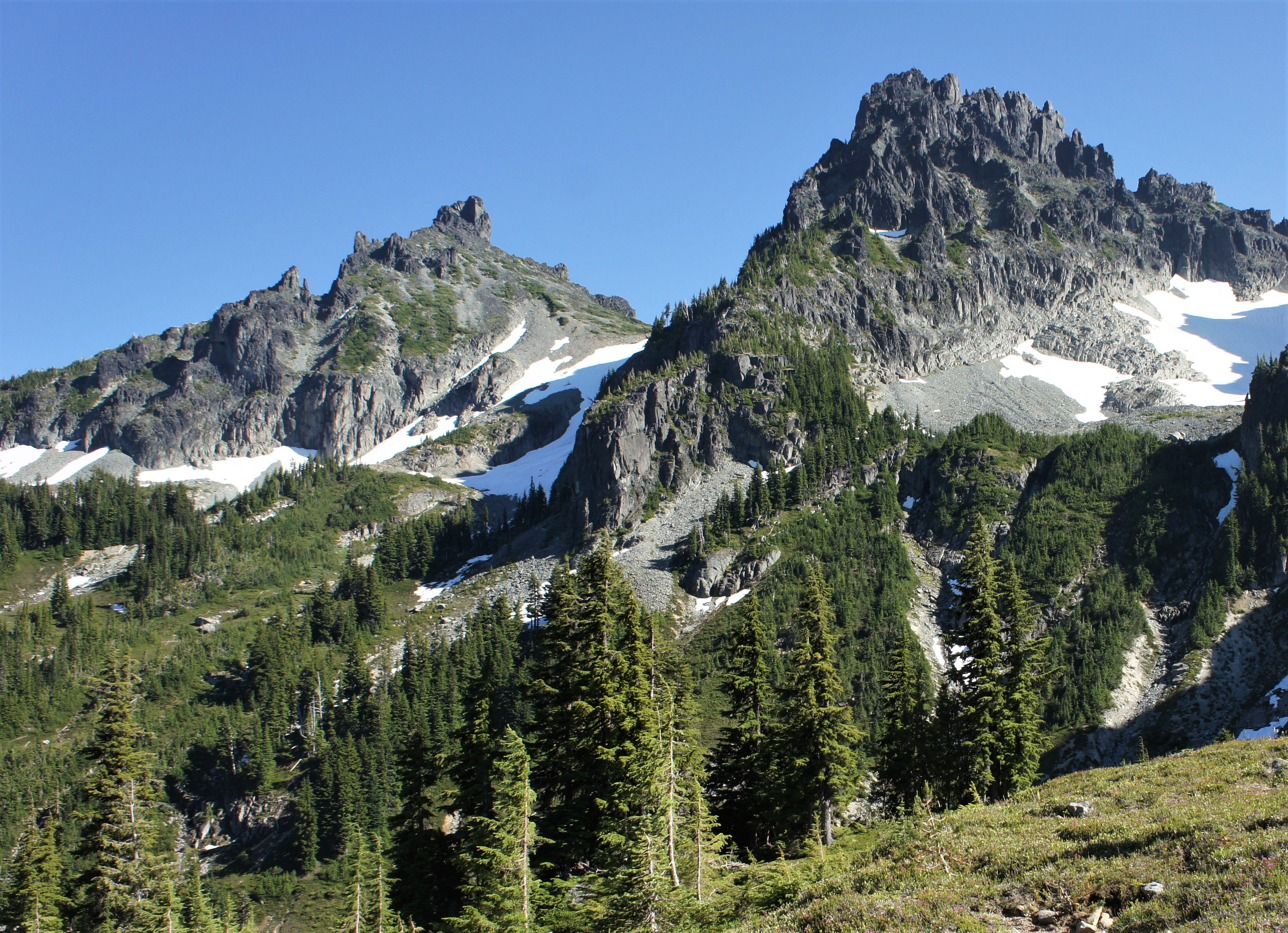
North aspect
