= Skyscraper Mountain =

Mountain in Washington (state), United States

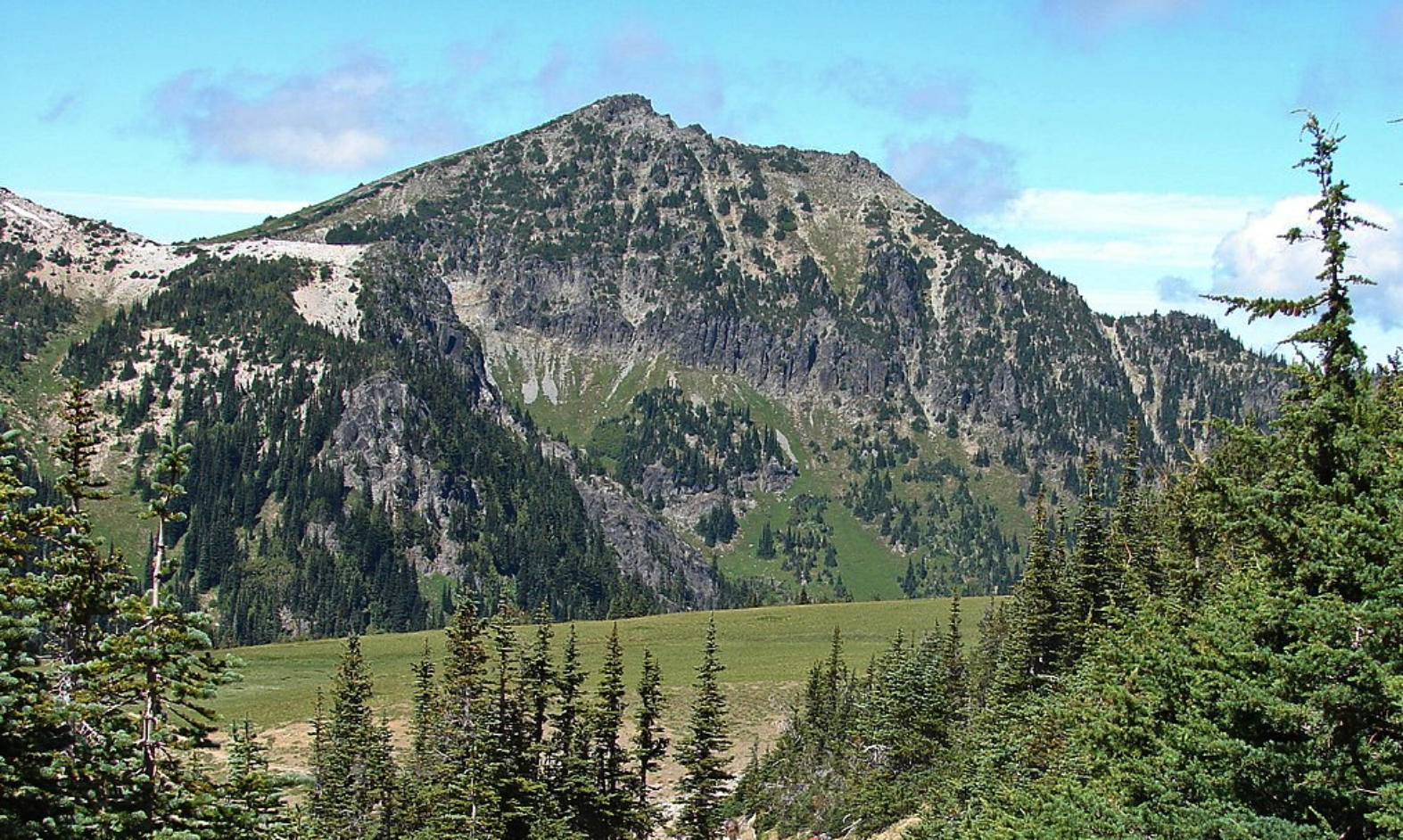
- Southeast aspect

Highest point
- Elevation: 7,078 ft (2,157 m)
- Prominence: 398 ft (121 m)
- Parent peak: Mount Fremont (7,317 ft)
- Isolation: 1.19 mi (1.92 km)
- Coordinates: 46°55′38″N 121°41′54″W

Geography
- Location within Washington (state) Location within the United States
- Country: United States
- State: Washington
- County: Pierce
- Protected area: Mount Rainier National Park
- Parent range: Cascades
- Topo map: USGS Sunrise

Climbing
- Easiest route: Hiking trail class 2

Skyscraper Mountain is a 7,078-foot-elevation (2,157-meter) summit in Pierce County of Washington state.

== Description ==
Skyscraper Mountain is part of the Cascade Range and is located in Mount Rainier National Park. It is situated northwest of the Sunrise Historic District, from which a four-mile hike leads to the mountain, mostly on the Wonderland Trail. However, the trail does not reach the summit, but it is still a walk up to the top from Skyscraper Pass. The summit provides views of Burroughs Mountain, Sluiskin Mountain, and Mount Rainier. Access is limited by snowpack closing the Sunrise Road much of the year. July, August, and September are typically the months when the Sunrise Road is seasonally open for vehicle traffic. Precipitation runoff from Skyscraper Mountain drains into tributaries of the White River and topographic relief is significant as the summit rises 3,040 feet (927 m) above the river in one mile (1.6 km). Mount Fremont is the nearest higher peak, 1.1 mi (1.8 km) to the east.

== History ==
The descriptive name Skyscraper Mountain came from its supposed resemblance to a modern style of architecture according to Edmond S. Meany. The toponym was officially adopted in 1932 by the United States Board on Geographic Names.

== Climate ==
Skyscraper Mountain is located in the marine west coast climate zone of western North America. Most weather fronts originating in the Pacific Ocean travel northeast toward the Cascade Mountains. As fronts approach, they are forced upward by the peaks of the Cascade Range (orographic lift), causing them to drop their moisture in the form of rain or snow onto the Cascades. As a result, the west side of the Cascades experiences high precipitation, especially during the winter months in the form of snowfall. Because of maritime influence, snow tends to be wet and heavy, resulting in high avalanche danger. During winter months, weather is usually cloudy, but due to high pressure systems over the Pacific Ocean that intensify during summer months, there is often little or no cloud cover during the summer.

== See also ==
- Geography of Washington (state)
- Geology of the Pacific Northwest

== Gallery ==
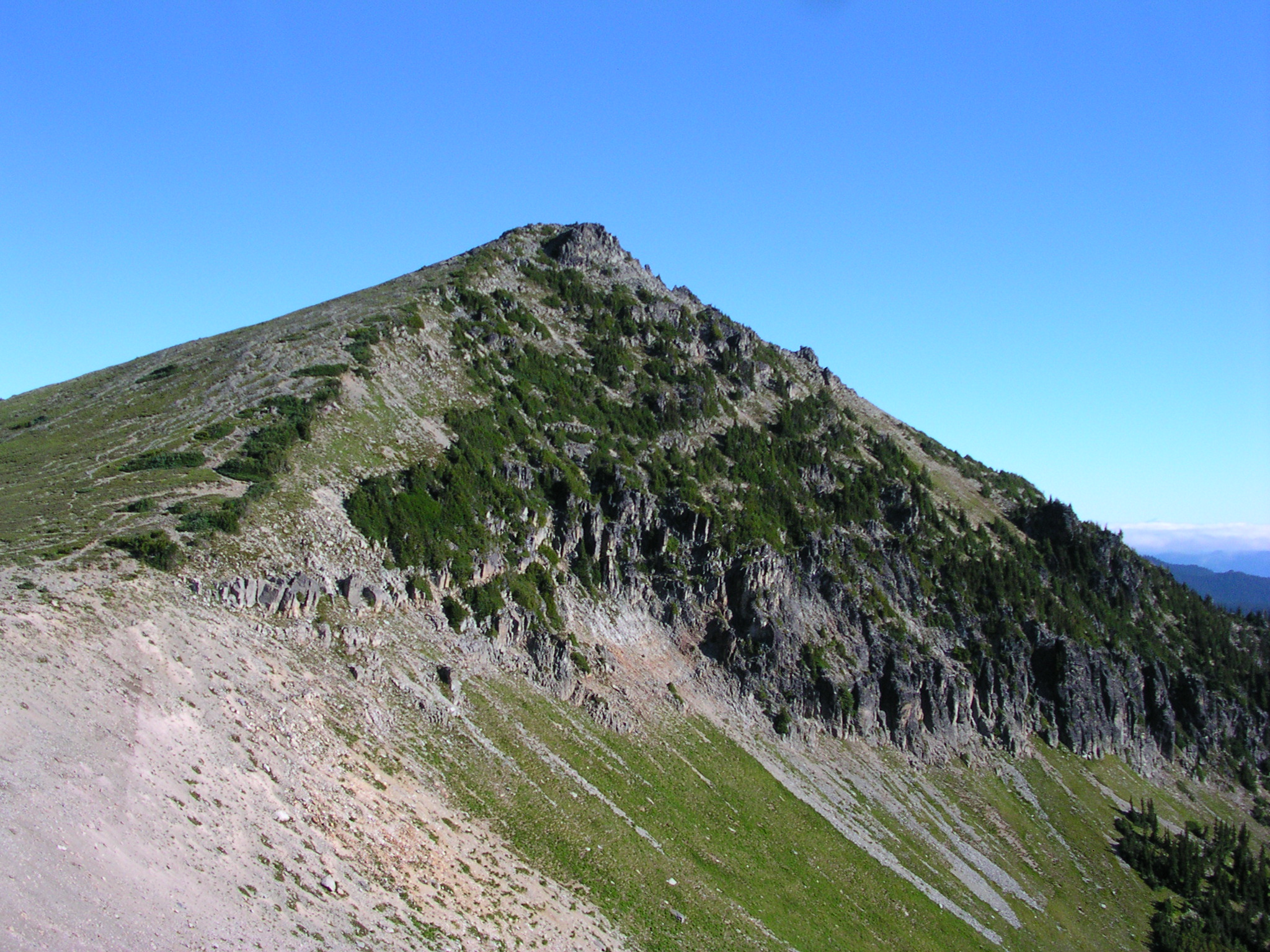
Skyscraper Mountain

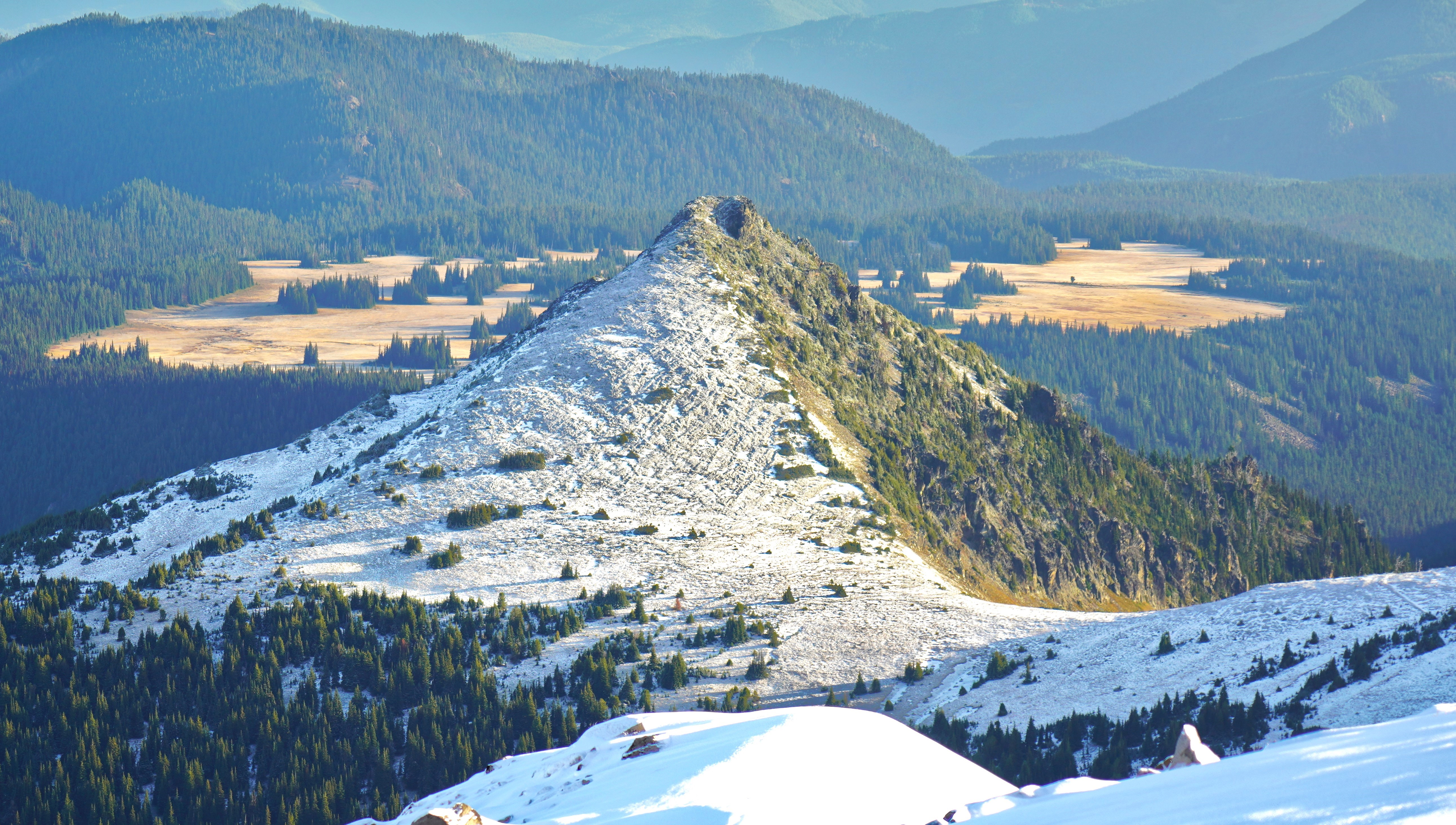
Skyscraper Mountain viewed from Third Burroughs Mountain

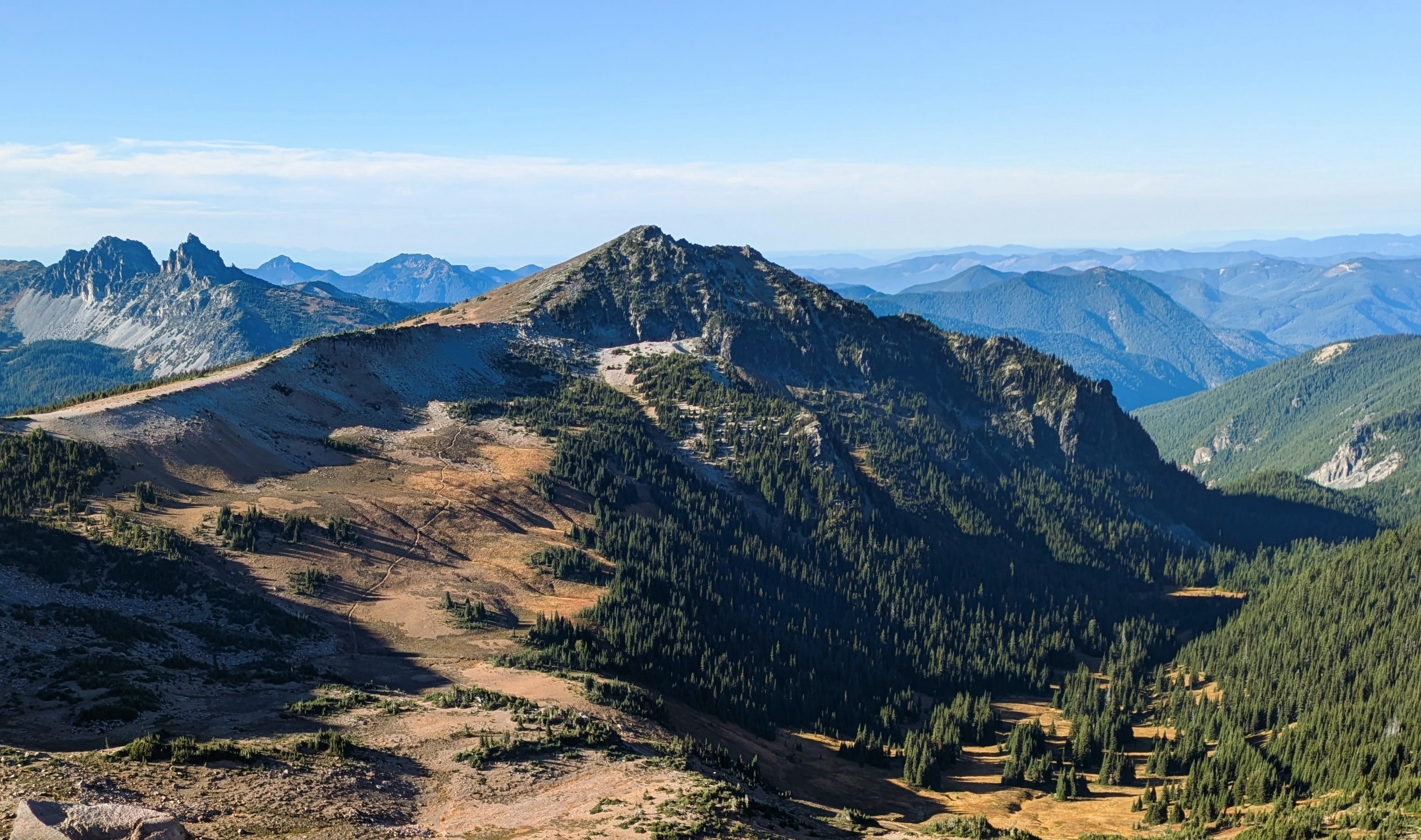
Skyscraper Mountain viewed from Burroughs Mountain

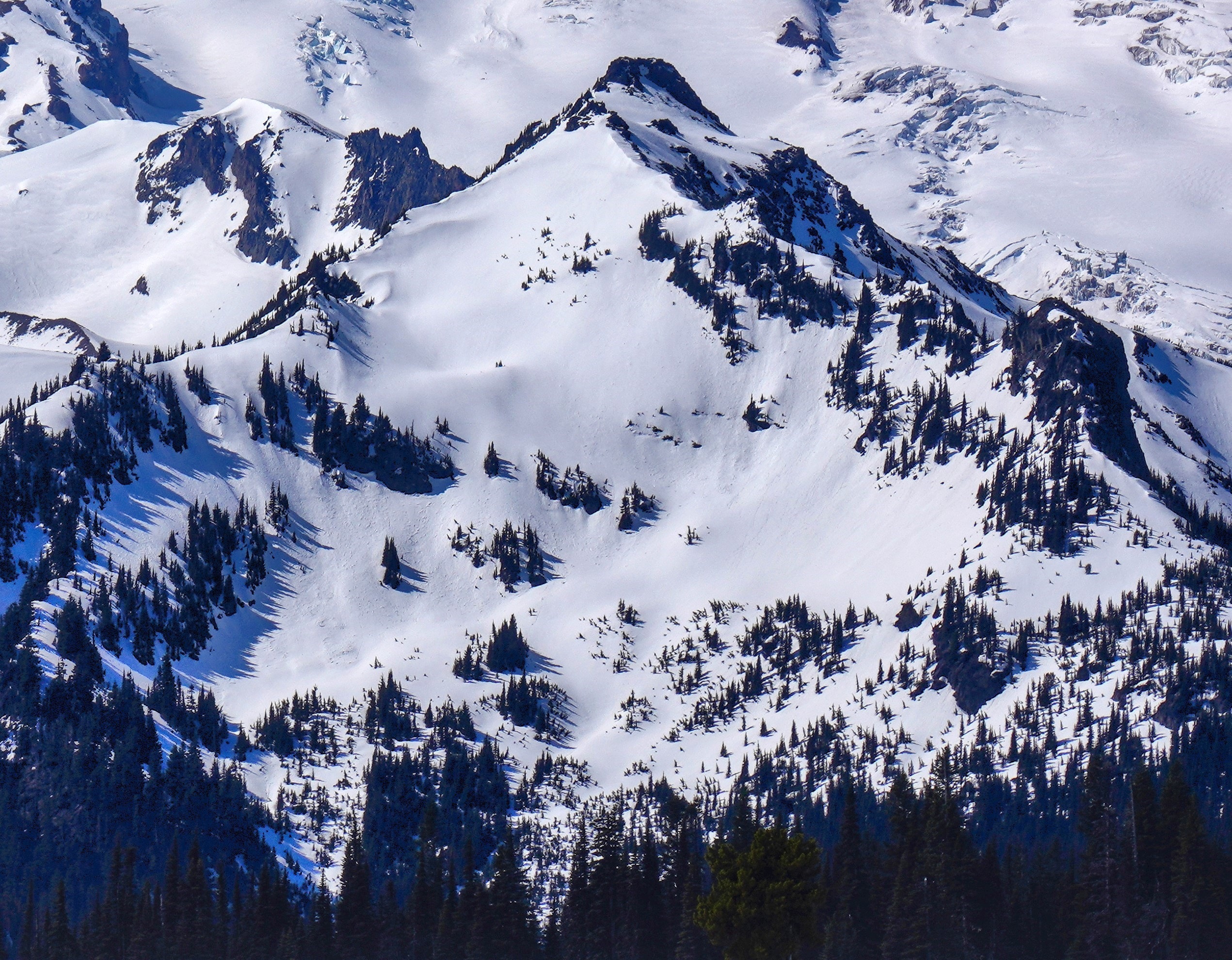
North aspect
