= Old Desolate =

Mountain in Washington (state), United States

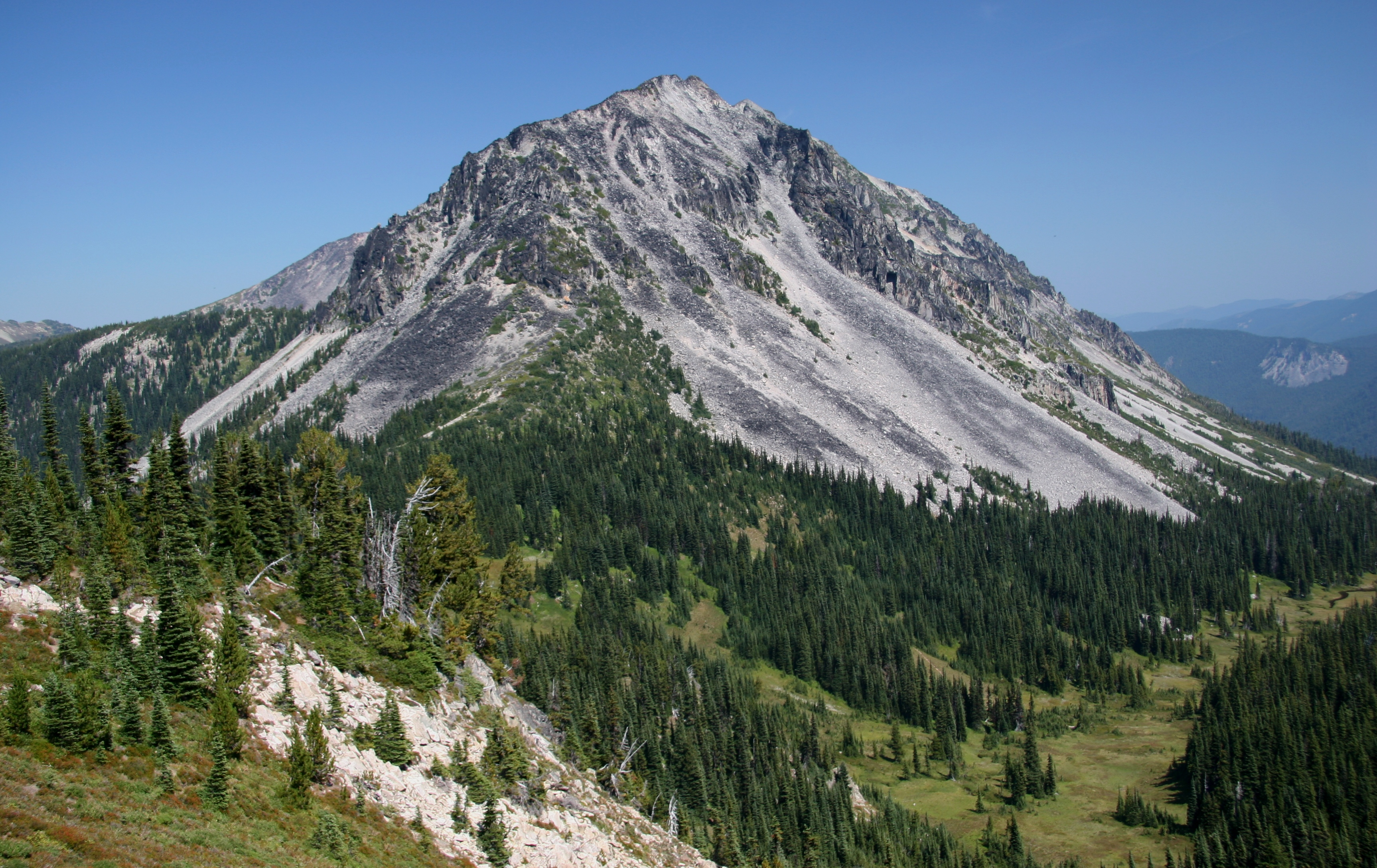
- Old Desolate's south peak

Highest point
- Elevation: 7,137 ft (2,175 m)
- Prominence: 1,017 ft (310 m)
- Parent peak: Burroughs Mountain (7,828 ft)
- Isolation: 2.38 mi (3.83 km)
- Coordinates: 46°55′30″N 121°45′01″W

Geography
- Location within Washington (state) Location within the United States
- Country: United States
- State: Washington
- County: Pierce
- Protected area: Mount Rainier National Park
- Parent range: Cascades
- Topo map: USGS Sunrise

Climbing
- Easiest route: scrambling from Moraine Park

Old Desolate is a 7,137-foot (2,175 m) multi-summit, ridge-like mountain located in Mount Rainier National Park, in Pierce County of Washington state. It is part of the Cascade Range, and lies five miles (8.0 km) due north of the summit of Mount Rainier. The Wonderland Trail provides an approach to this mountain, and the summit offers views of Sluiskin Mountain and Mount Rainier. Burroughs Mountain is the nearest higher neighbor, 2.37 mi (3.81 km) to the southeast. Precipitation runoff from Old Desolate drains east into the West Fork White River, or west into the Carbon River.

== History ==
The descriptive name Old Desolate derives from its position standing desolate and alone at the western edge of Vernal Park. The toponym was officially adopted in 1932 by the United States Board on Geographic Names, which noted that there were three peaks on the mountain, with elevations of 7,130-feet for the central peak, 7,003-ft for the south peak, and 7,004-ft for the north one, and the north and south peaks being a mile apart.

== Climate ==
Old Desolate is located in the marine west coast climate zone of western North America. Most weather fronts originating in the Pacific Ocean travel northeast toward the Cascade Mountains. As fronts approach, they are forced upward by the peaks of the Cascade Range (orographic lift), causing them to drop their moisture in the form of rain or snow onto the Cascades. As a result, the west side of the Cascades experiences high precipitation, especially during the winter months in the form of snowfall. Because of maritime influence, snow tends to be wet and heavy, resulting in high avalanche danger. During winter months, weather is usually cloudy, but due to high pressure systems over the Pacific Ocean that intensify during summer months, there is often little or no cloud cover during the summer. The months of July through September offer the most favorable weather for viewing or climbing this peak.

== Gallery ==
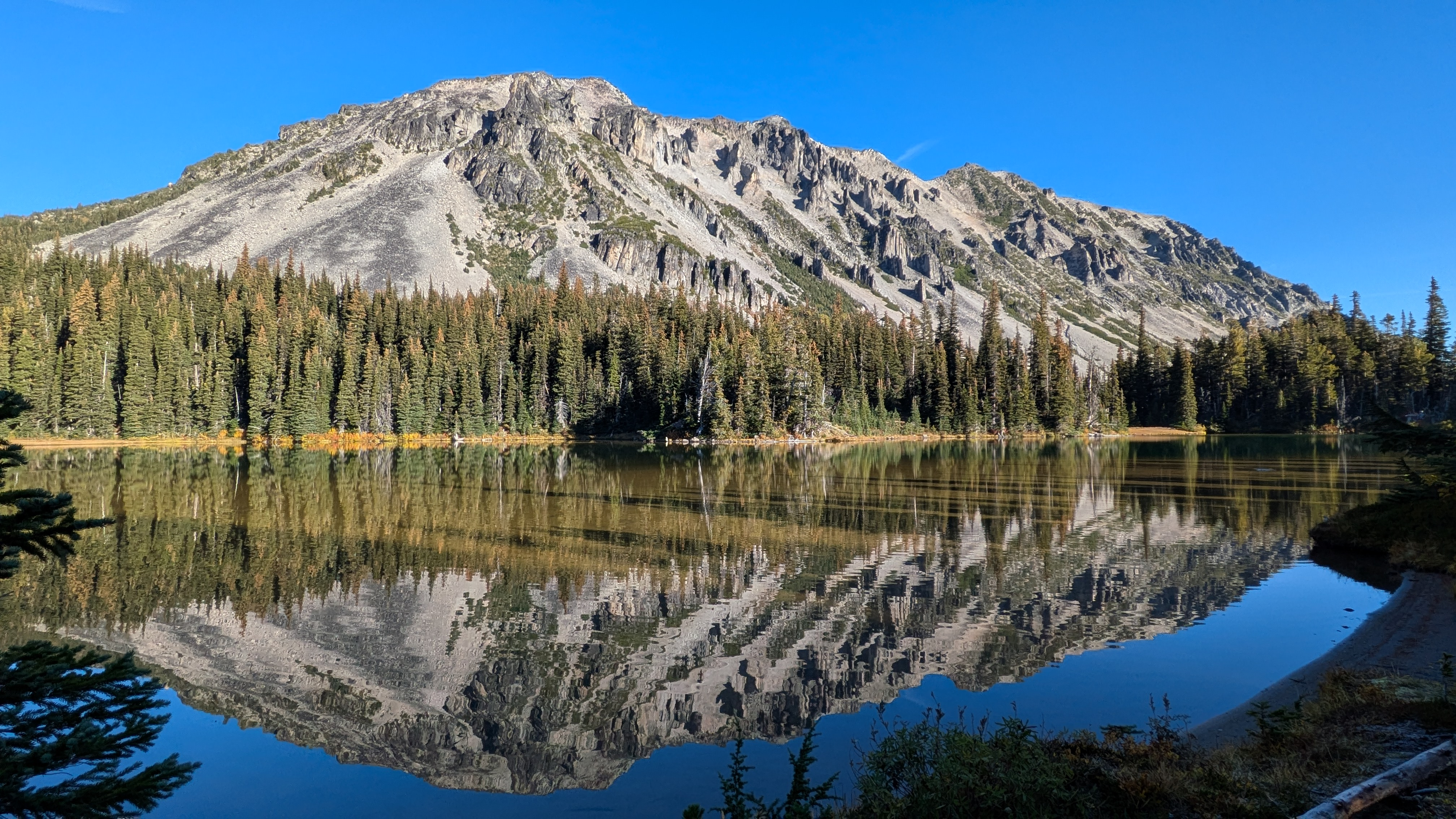
Old Desolate reflected in Mystic Lake

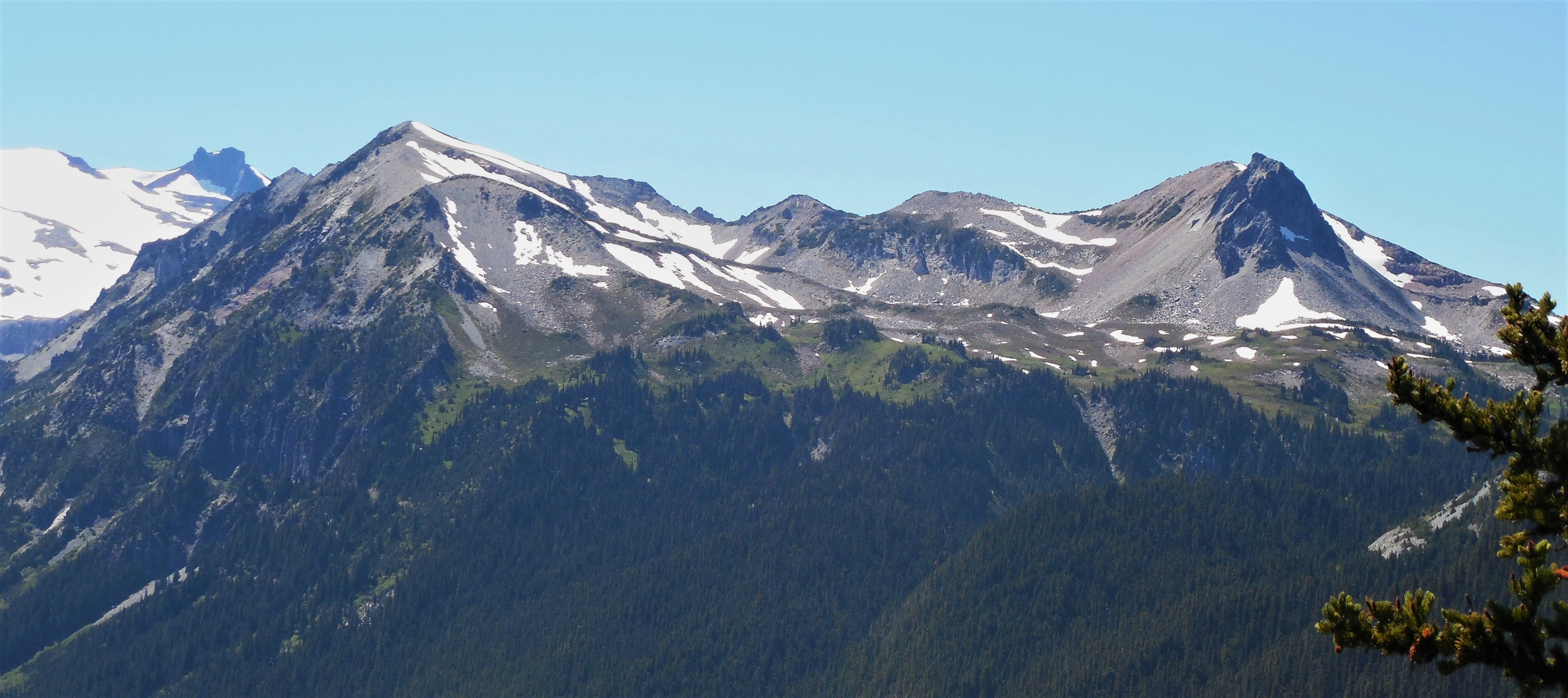
Old Desolate from the northeast. True summit (left), north peak (right).

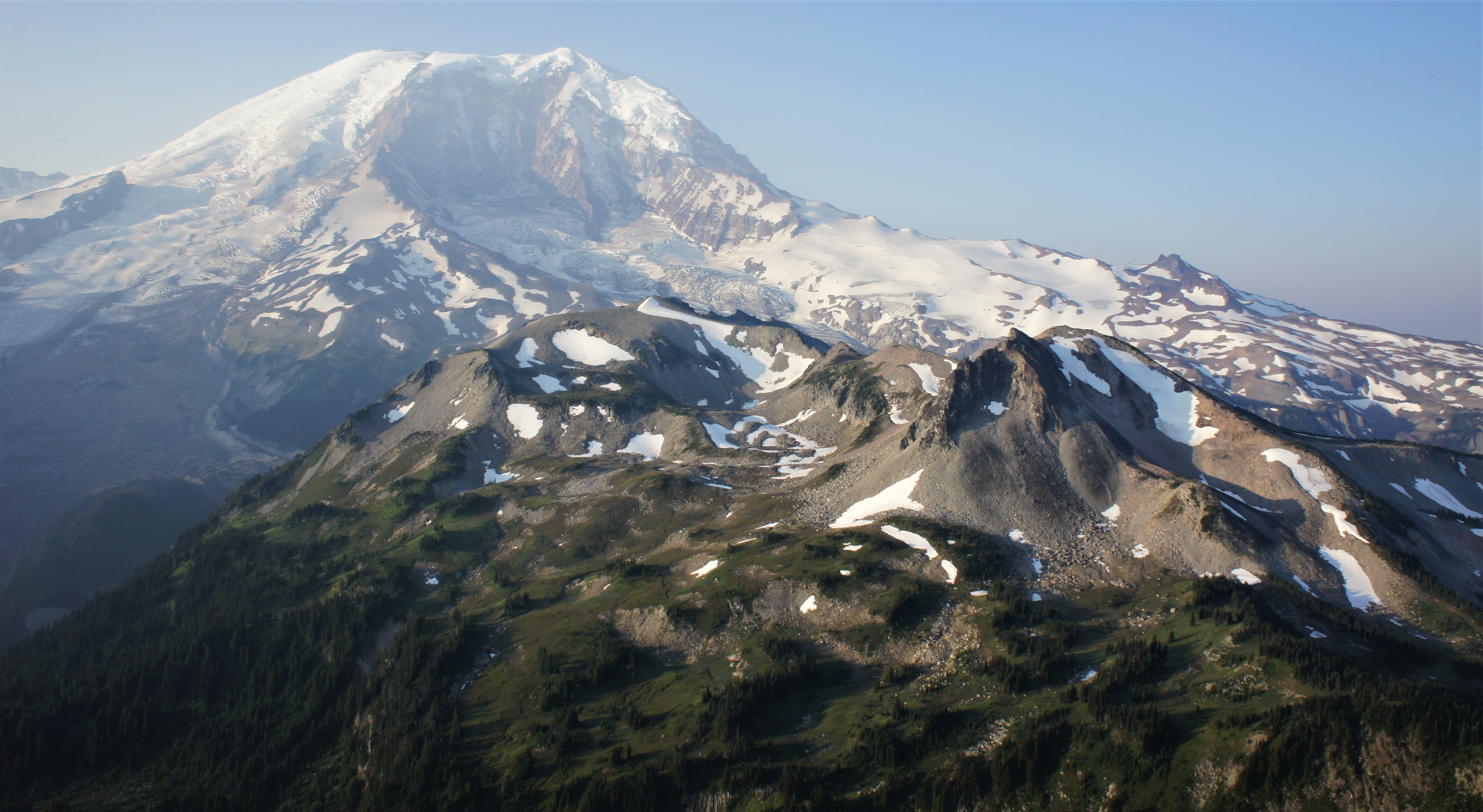
Old Desolate and Mt. Rainier behind

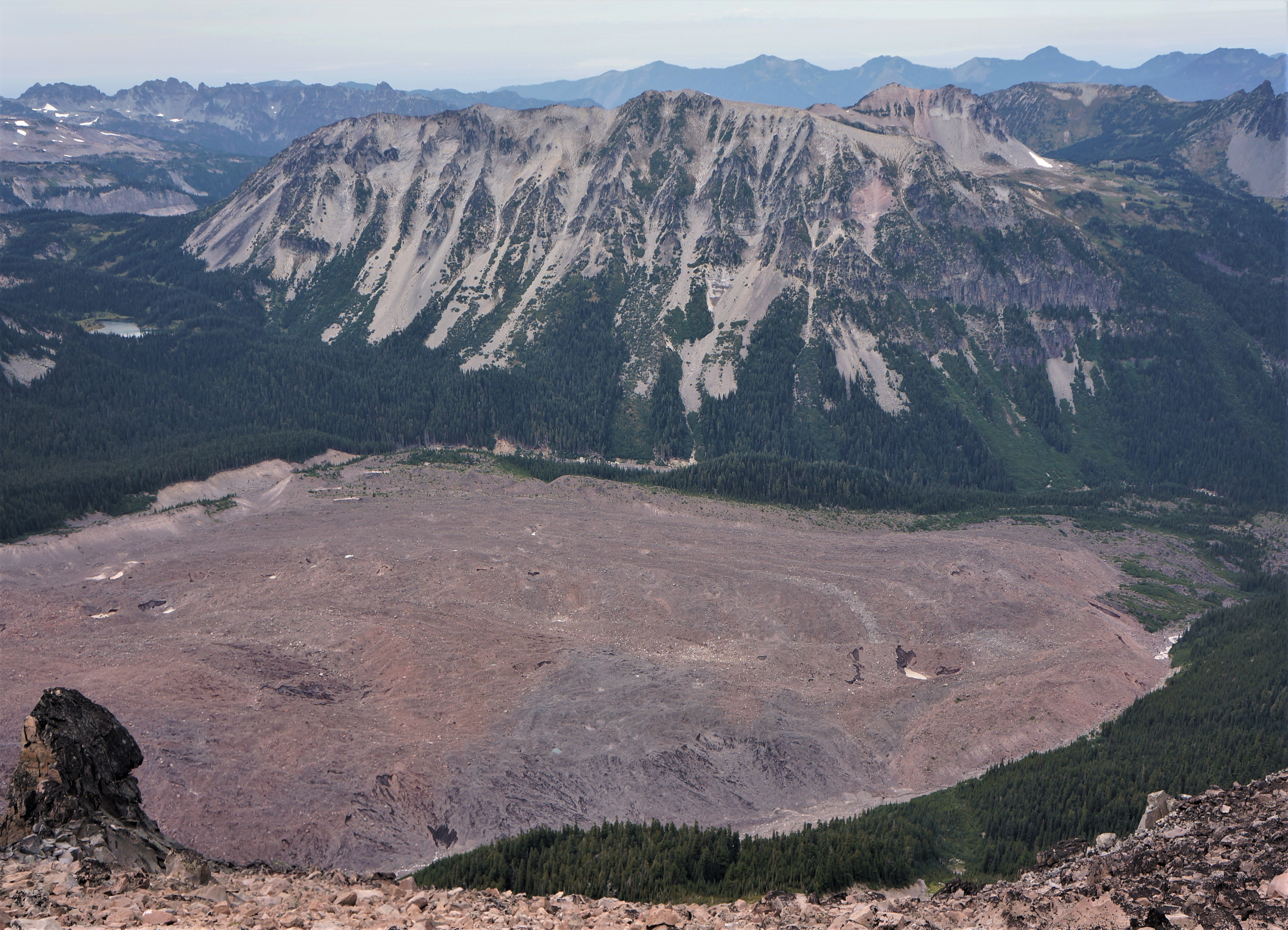
Winthrop Glacier terminus and Old Desolate seen from Burroughs Mountain

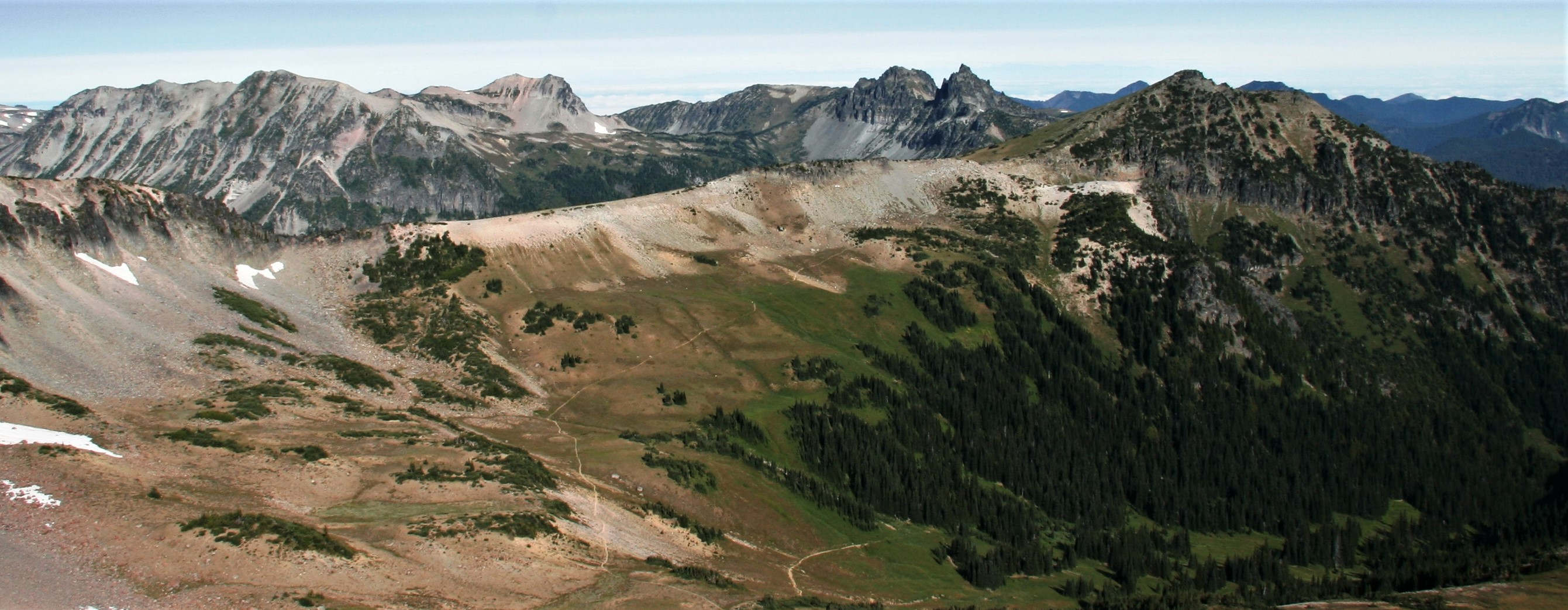
Old Desolate, Sluiskin Mountain, and Skyscraper Mountain from the southeast

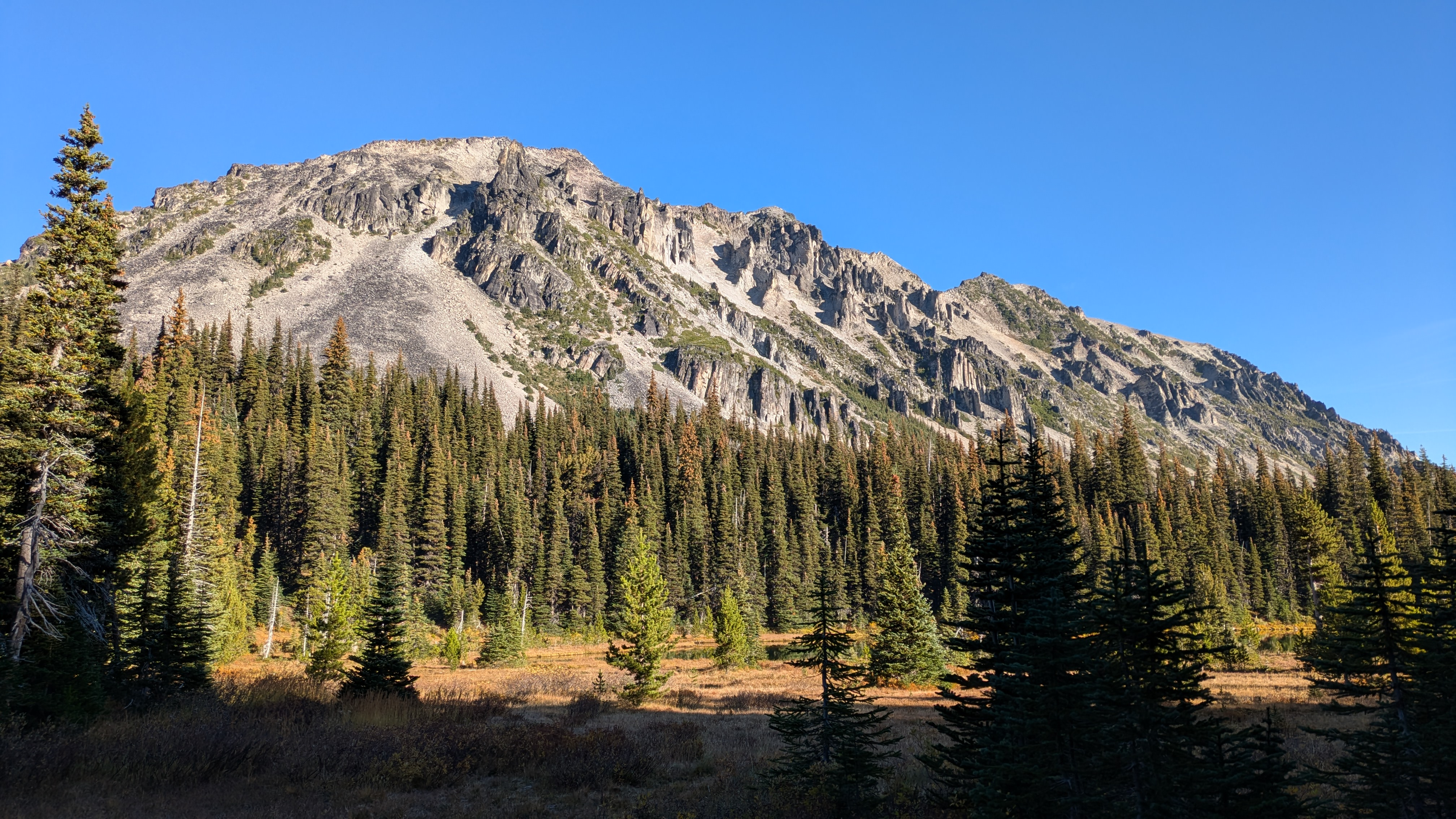
Southeast aspect

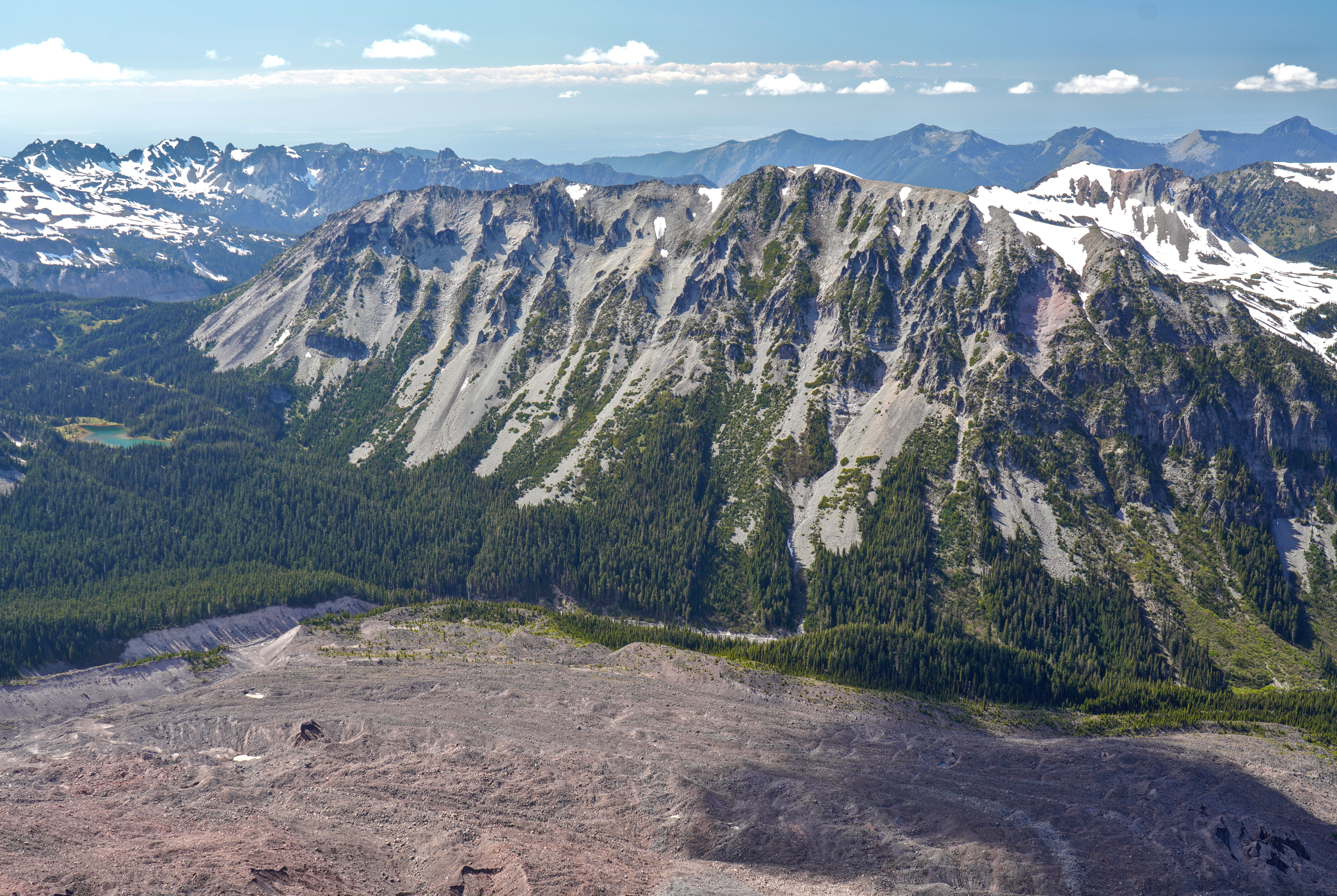
Winthrop Glacier terminus and Old Desolate seen from Burroughs Mountain

== See also ==
- Geology of the Pacific Northwest
