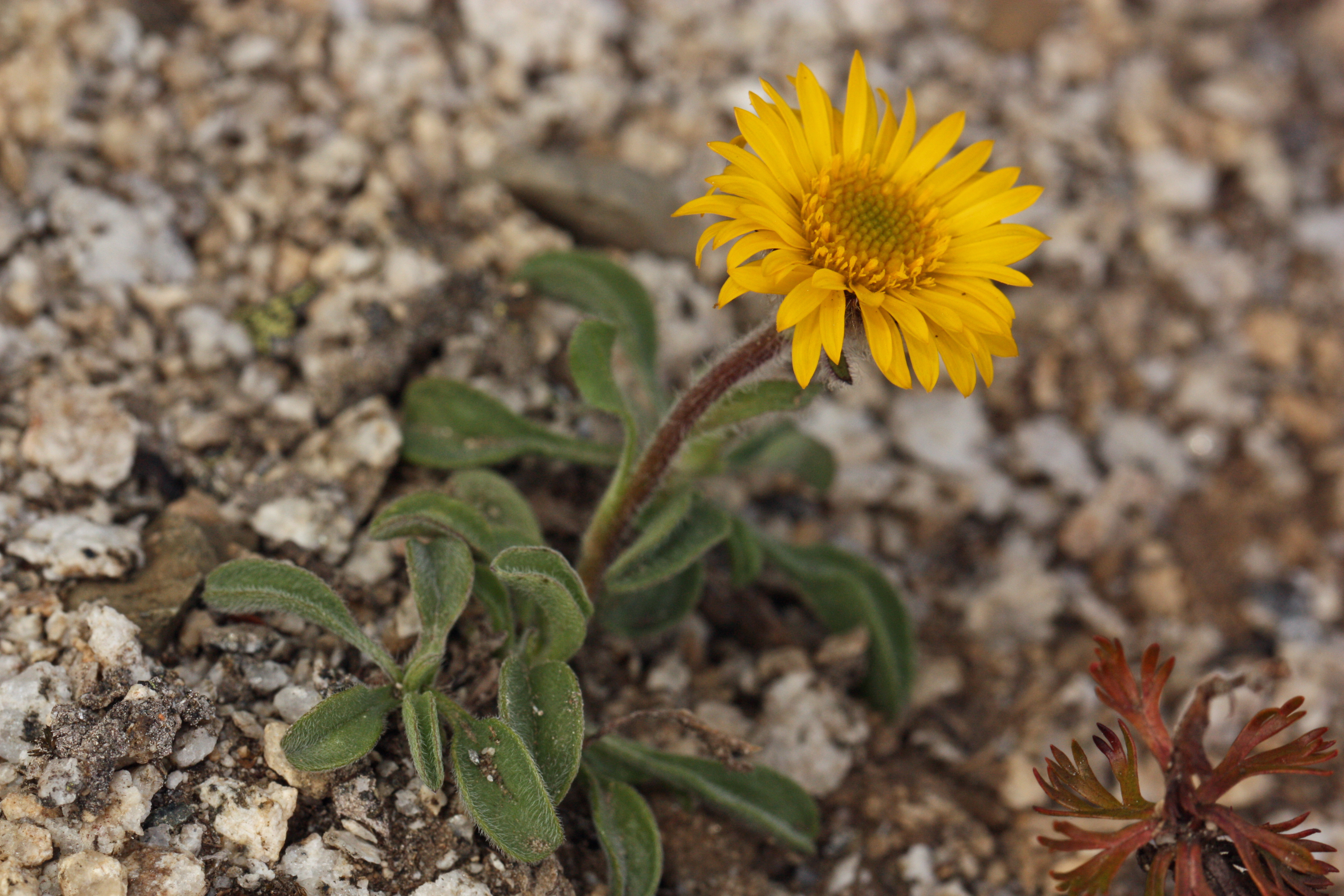

Scientific classification
- Kingdom: Plantae
- Clade: Tracheophytes
- Clade: Angiosperms
- Clade: Eudicots
- Clade: Asterids
- Order: Asterales
- Family: Asteraceae
- Genus: Erigeron
- Species: E. aureus

Binomial name
- Erigeron aureus Greene

Synonyms
- Aplopappus brandegeei A.Gray 1884 not Erigeron brandegeei A. Gray 1884; Haplopappus brandegeei A.Gray 1884 not Erigeron brandegeei A. Gray 1884; Aster brandegeei (A.Gray) Kuntze; Erigeron arthurii B.Boivin; Stenotus brandegei (A.Gray) Howell

= Erigeron aureus =

Species of flowering plant

Erigeron aureus, the Alpine yellow fleabane, is a species of flowering plant in the family Asteraceae, native to the Cascades and Rocky Mountains of northwestern North America (Alberta, British Columbia, Washington). The specific epithet aureus means "golden yellow".

== Range and Habitat ==
Erigeron aureus is native to the Cascades and Rocky Mountains of northwestern North America (Alberta, British Columbia, Washington). It grows in high mountains on exposed ridges and rocky slopes and in rock crevices.

== Description ==
Erigeron aureus is a very small, short-lived herbaceous perennial growing to 10 cm (4 in), rarely 20 cm (8 in) tall. It has tufts of hairy grey-green leaves with large solitary yellow daisy-like flower heads to 2.5 cm (0.98 in) wide, appearing in summer.

== Cultivation ==
Erigeron aureus is suitable for cultivation in a rockery, wall or similar sunny, well-drained site.

In the UK it thrives in the warmer western and southern coastal areas, though it is listed as hardy down to −10 °C (14 °F). The cultivar 'Canary Bird', longer-lived than wild populations of the species, has gained the Royal Horticultural Society's Award of Garden Merit.
