= Burroughs Mountain =

Mountain in Washington (state), United States

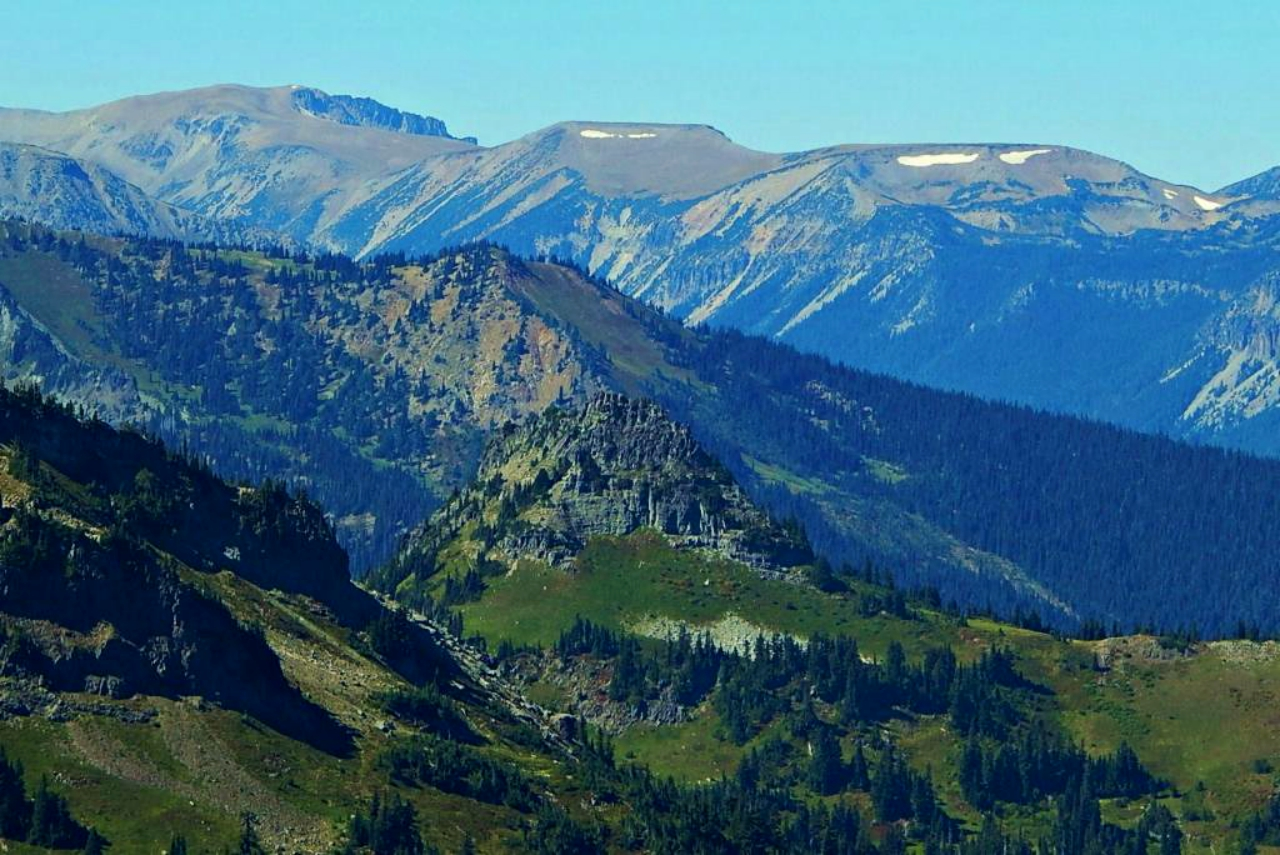
- Burroughs Mountain from east

Highest point
- Elevation: 7,828 ft (2,386 m)
- Prominence: 388 ft (118 m)
- Coordinates: 46°54′06″N 121°42′49″W

Naming
- Etymology: John Burroughs

Geography
- Location within Washington (state) Location within the United States
- Country: United States
- State: Washington
- County: Pierce
- Protected area: Mount Rainier National Park
- Parent range: Cascades
- Topo map: USGS Sunrise

Geology
- Rock type: Andesitic lava

Climbing
- Easiest route: Trail

Burroughs Mountain is a mountain in Pierce County, Washington, United States.

== Description ==
Burroughs Mountain is located on the northeast slope of Mount Rainier above Glacier Basin. It was named for John Burroughs, the naturalist, who visited the mountain several times. The mountain was first called John Burroughs Mountain. Burroughs was born near Roxbury, New York, in April 1837, and died in 1931. He wrote extensively about his travels and was associated with the conservation movement. He became a well known "character" and is best remembered for his "Nature Essay." The mountain's toponym was officially adopted in 1932 by the United States Board on Geographic Names.

Burroughs Mountain is a high ridge formed from an ancient lava flow. Its three summit plateaus get progressively higher. The mountain, located within Mount Rainier National Park, is notable for alpine tundra, with plants typically seen at much higher latitudes. The tundra ground cover hugs the barren rocky plateau and has a short growing season because snow covers the ridge for much of the year in the harsh alpine climate. The unique fragile alpine tundra can be easily destroyed by people walking off the established trail.

The mountain is a popular hiking destination with grand close-up views of the Emmons Glacier, Winthrop Glacier, Inter Glacier, Fryingpan Glacier, Little Tahoma Peak, and views in all directions because most of the trail is above tree line. The trail starts at the Sunrise Historic District and loops up to First Burroughs Mountain (elevation 7,160 feet) and Second Burroughs Mountain (elevation 7,402 feet). Third Burroughs Mountain (7,828 feet) is reached on an unofficial trail and is about another mile beyond Second Burroughs. The loop trail is about 6.2 miles and part of this loop trail includes a short section of the Wonderland Trail. Access is limited by snow closing the Sunrise Road much of the year, and even more by ice blocking the trail above Frozen Lake. July, August, and September are the months when the Sunrise Road is seasonally open for vehicle traffic.

== Geology ==
Burroughs Mountain, situated at the northeast foot of Mount Rainier, WA, exposes a large-volume (3.4 km3) andesitic lava flow, up to 350 m thick and extending 11 km in length. Two sampling traverses from flow base to eroded top, over vertical sections of 245 and 300 m, show that the flow consists of a felsic lower unit (100 m thick) overlain sharply by a more mafic upper unit. The mafic upper unit is chemically zoned, becoming slightly more evolved upward; the lower unit is heterogeneous and unzoned. The lower unit is also more phenocryst-rich and locally contains inclusions of quenched basaltic andesite magma that are absent from the upper unit. Widespread, gabbronorite-to-diorite inclusions may be fragments of shallow cumulates, exhumed from the Mount Rainier magmatic system.

== Flora ==
Burroughs Mountain is renowned for its accessible variety of alpine tundra plants including sedges (Cyperaceae), Saxifraga, Dwarf lupine (Lupinus lepidus), Luetkea, Antennaria, Koenigia davisiae, Alpine yellow fleabane (Erigeron aureus), Tundra Aster (Oreostemma alpigenum), Empetrum nigrum, Arenaria lateriflora, and more.

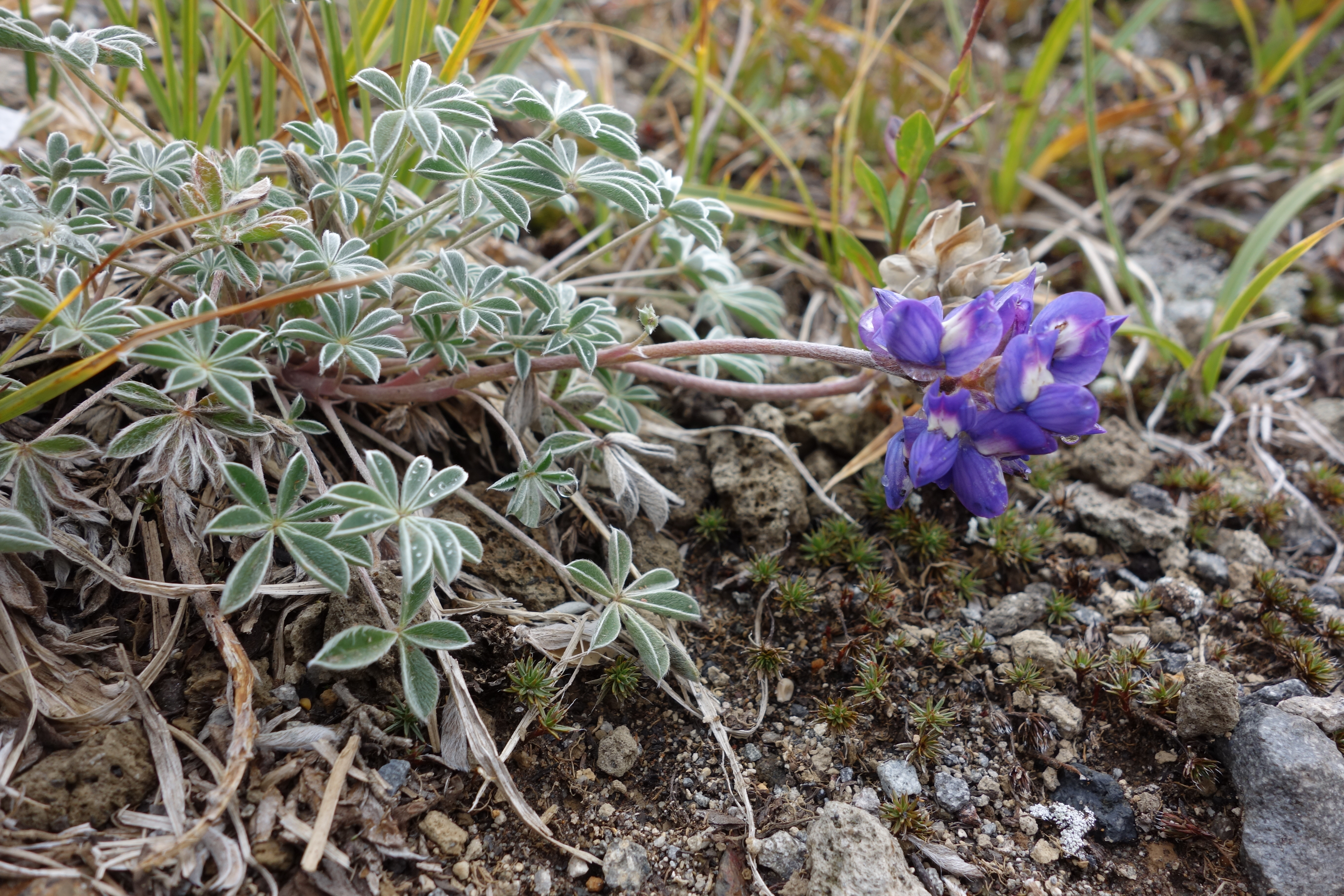
Dwarf Lupine (Lupinus lepidus)

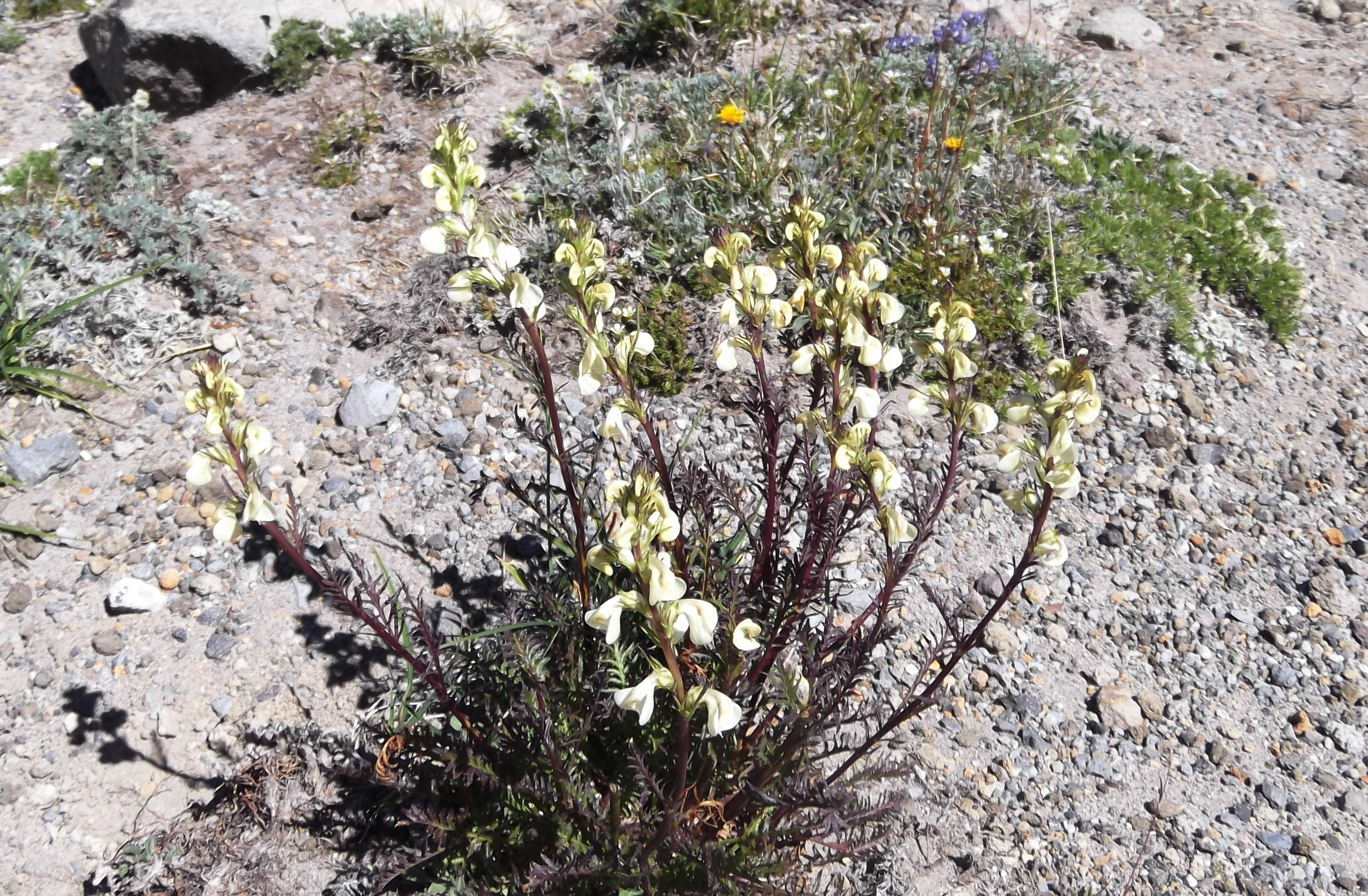
Curved-beak lousewort (Pedicularis contorta)

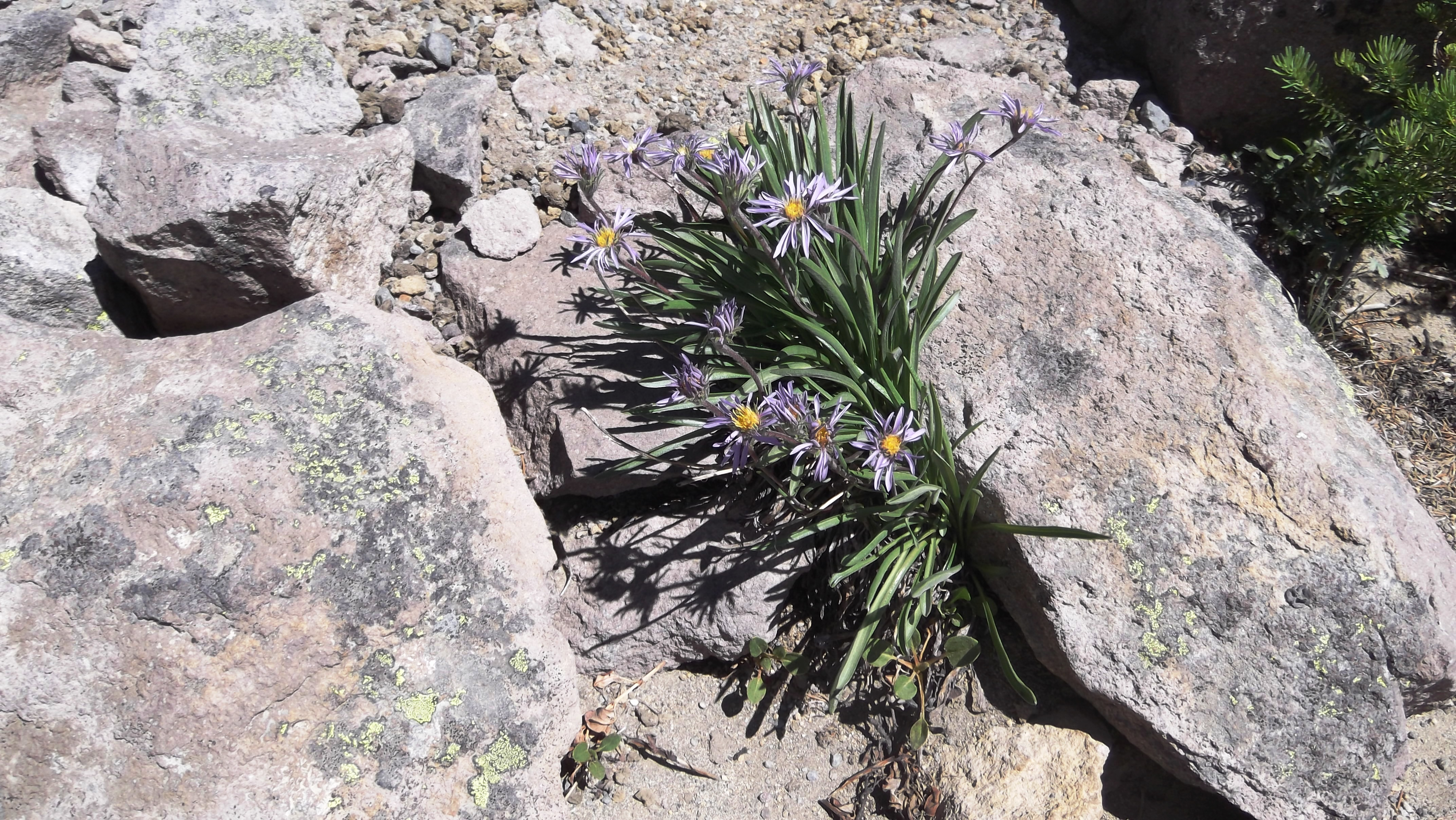
Tundra Aster (Oreostemma alpigenum)

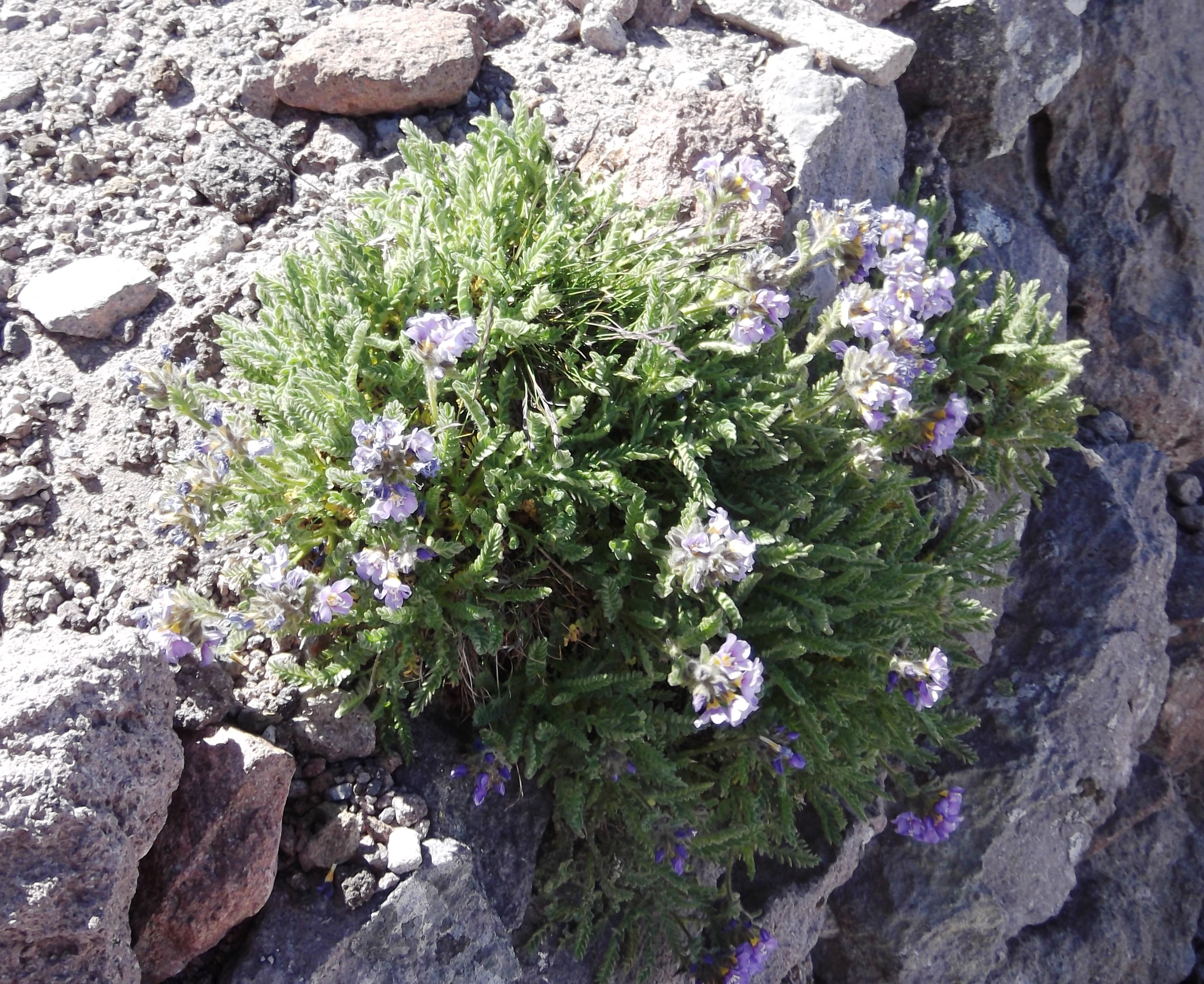
Polemonium elegans

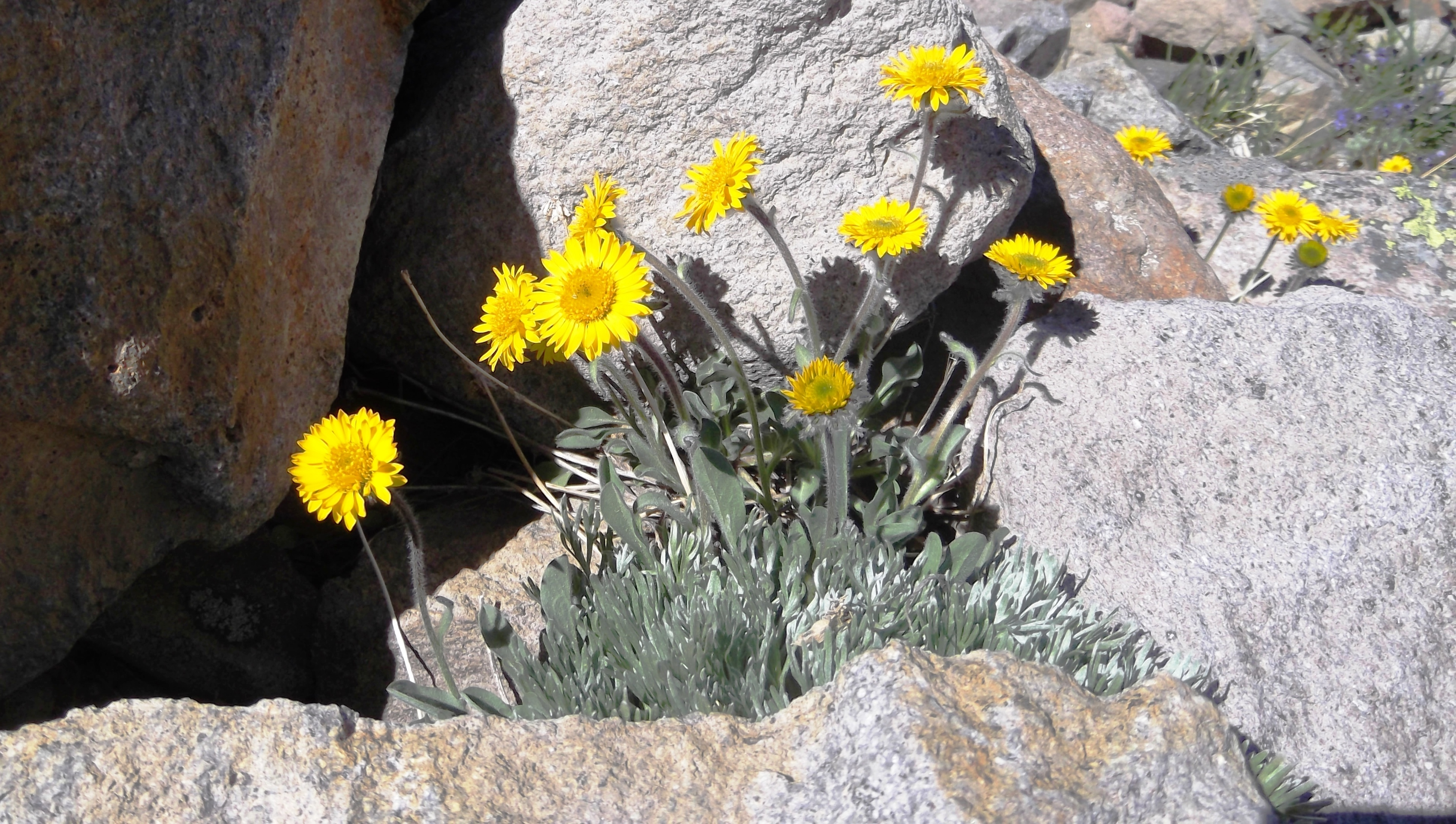
Golden fleabane (Erigeron aureus)

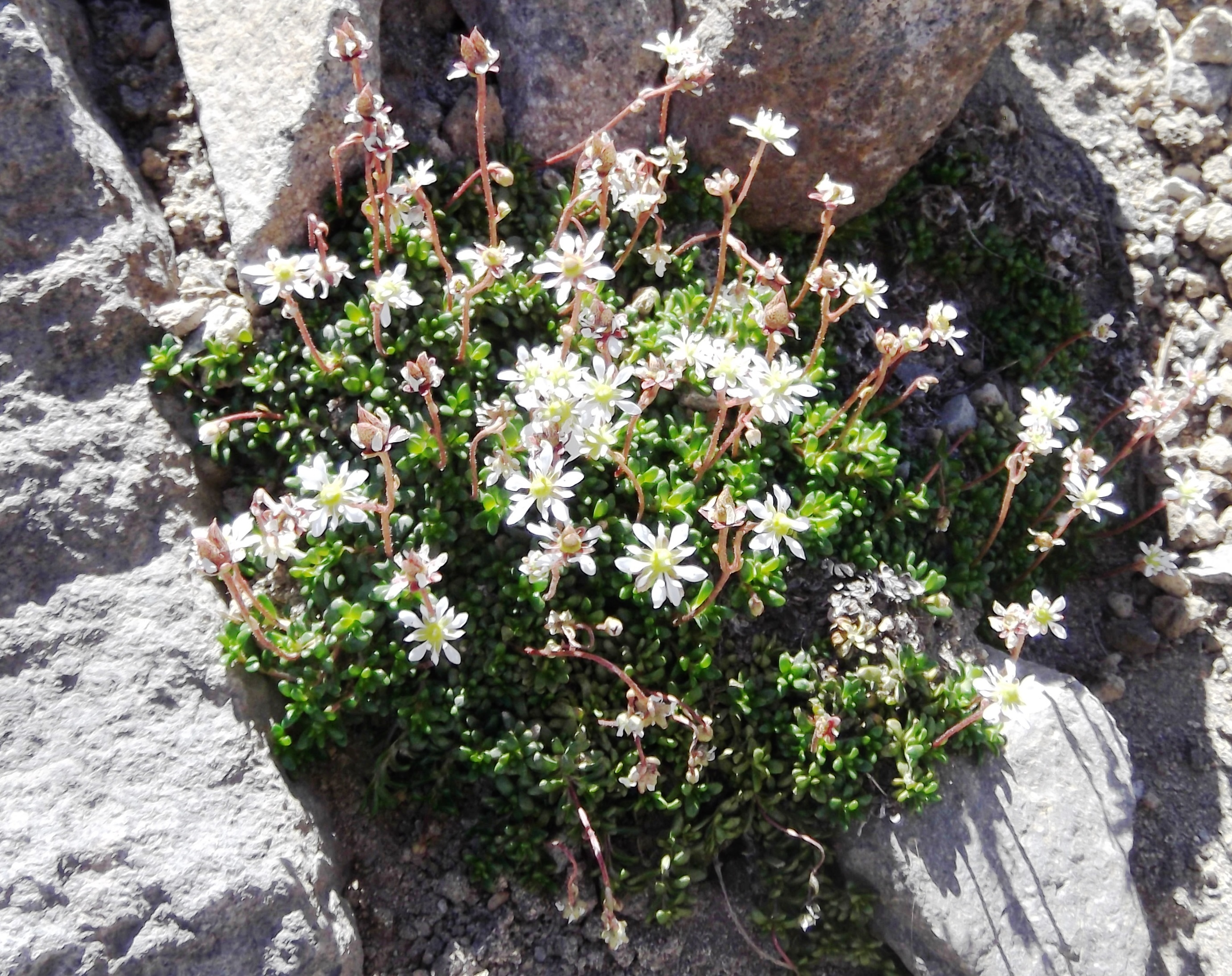
Tolmie's saxifrage (Micranthes tolmiei)

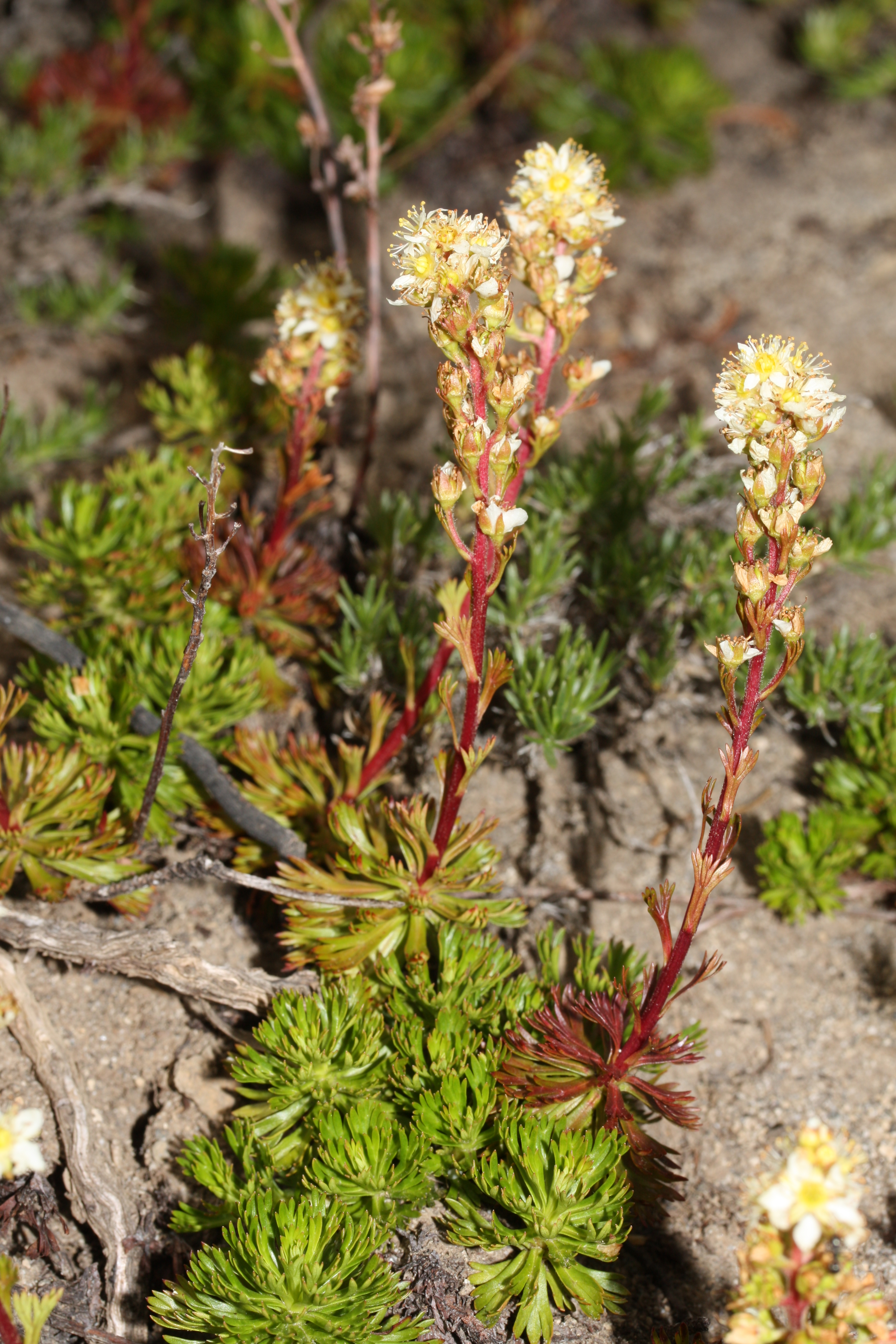
Luetkea pectinata

== Fauna ==
Burroughs Mountain is habitat for the marmot, pika, mountain goat, and chipmunk. Deer and the American black bear (Ursus americanus) can be found lower on the mountain in Berkeley Park.

== Climate ==
Burroughs Mountain is located in the marine west coast climate zone of western North America. Most weather fronts originate in the Pacific Ocean, and travel northeast toward the Cascade Mountains. As fronts approach, they are forced upward by the peaks of the Cascade Range, causing them to drop their moisture in the form of rain or snowfall onto the Cascades. As a result, the west side of the North Cascades experiences high precipitation, especially during the winter months in the form of snowfall. Because of maritime influence, snow tends to be wet and heavy, resulting in high avalanche danger. During winter months, weather is usually cloudy, but, due to high pressure systems over the Pacific Ocean that intensify during summer months, there is often little or no cloud cover during the summer. Due to its temperate climate and proximity to the Pacific Ocean, areas west of the Cascade Crest very rarely experience temperatures below 0 °F (−18 °C) or above 80 °F (27 °C).

== Gallery ==
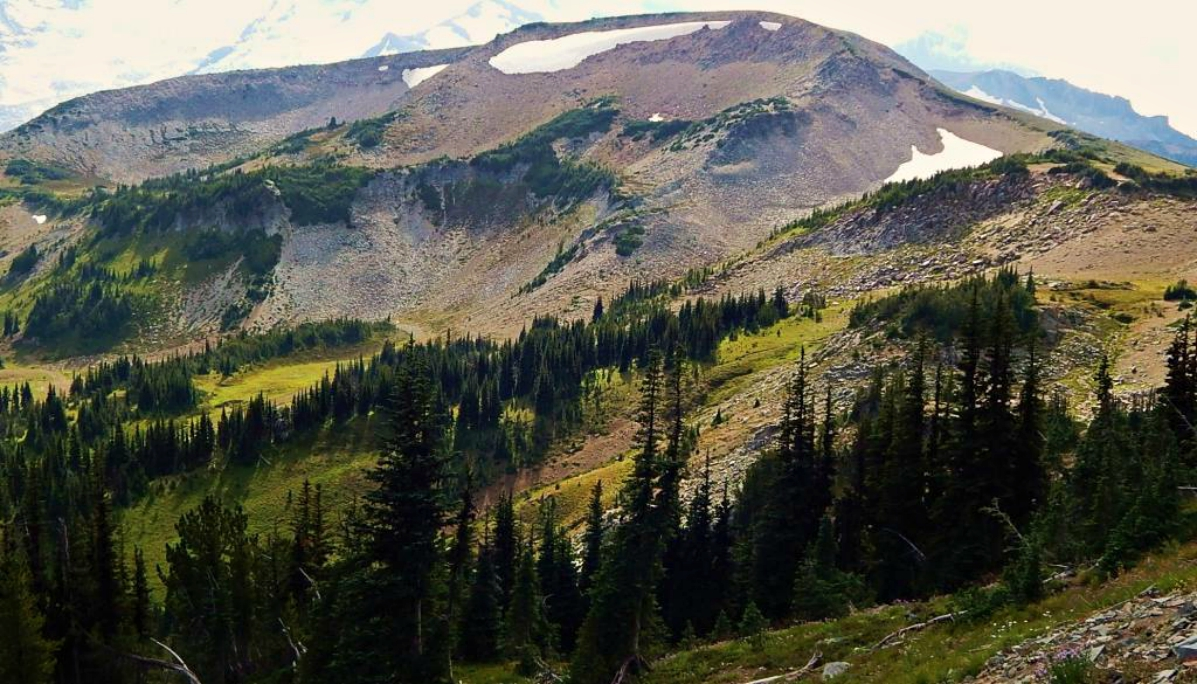
First Burroughs Mountain

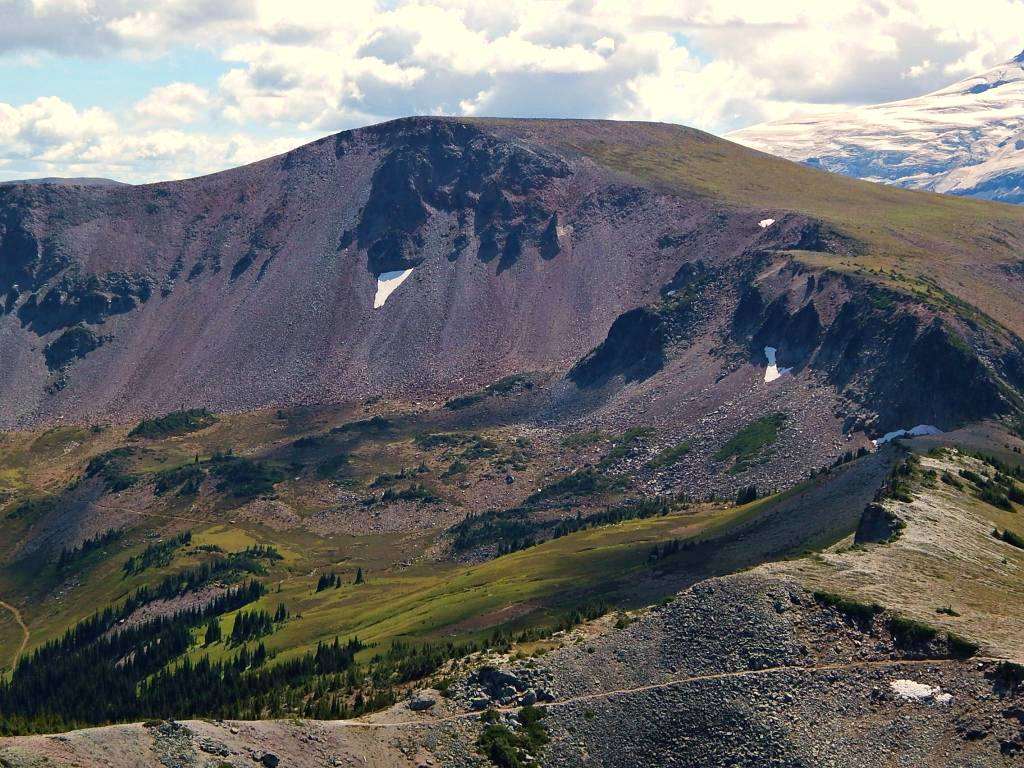
Second Burroughs Mountain (seen from Skyscraper Mountain)

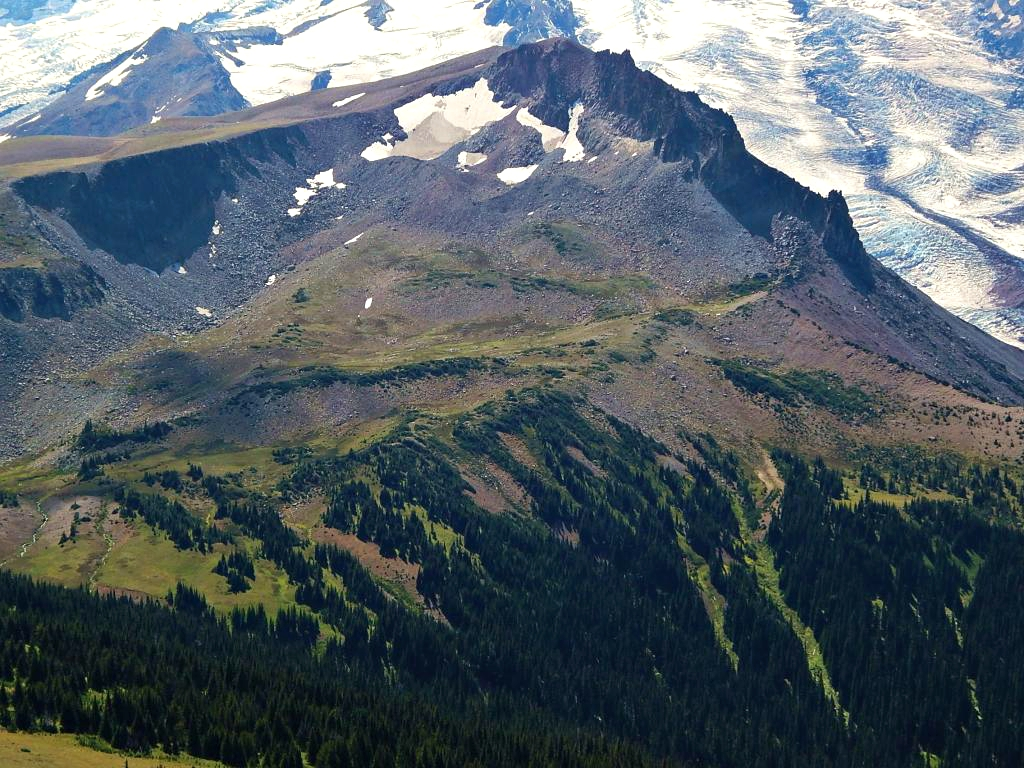
Third Burroughs Mountain

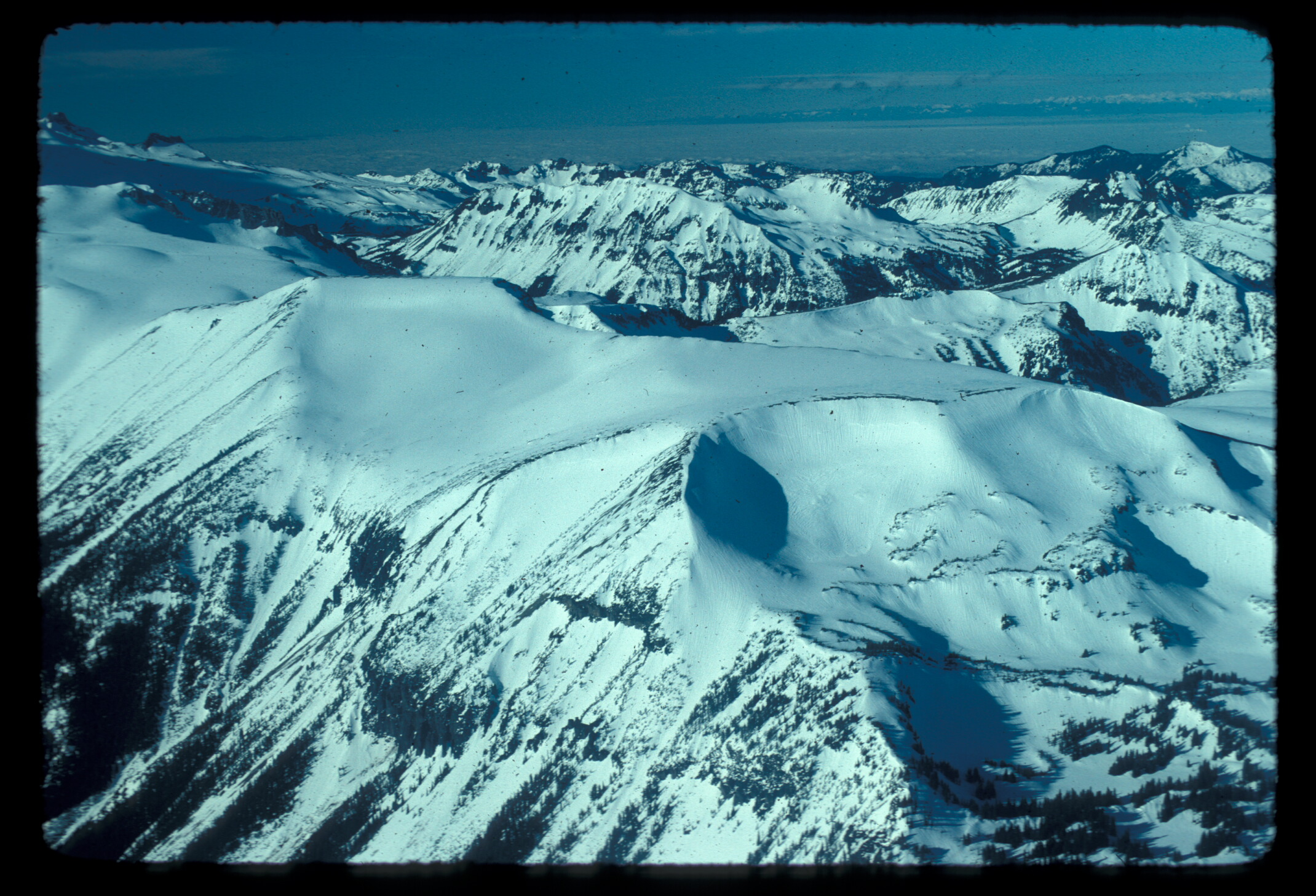
Burroughs Mountain from above

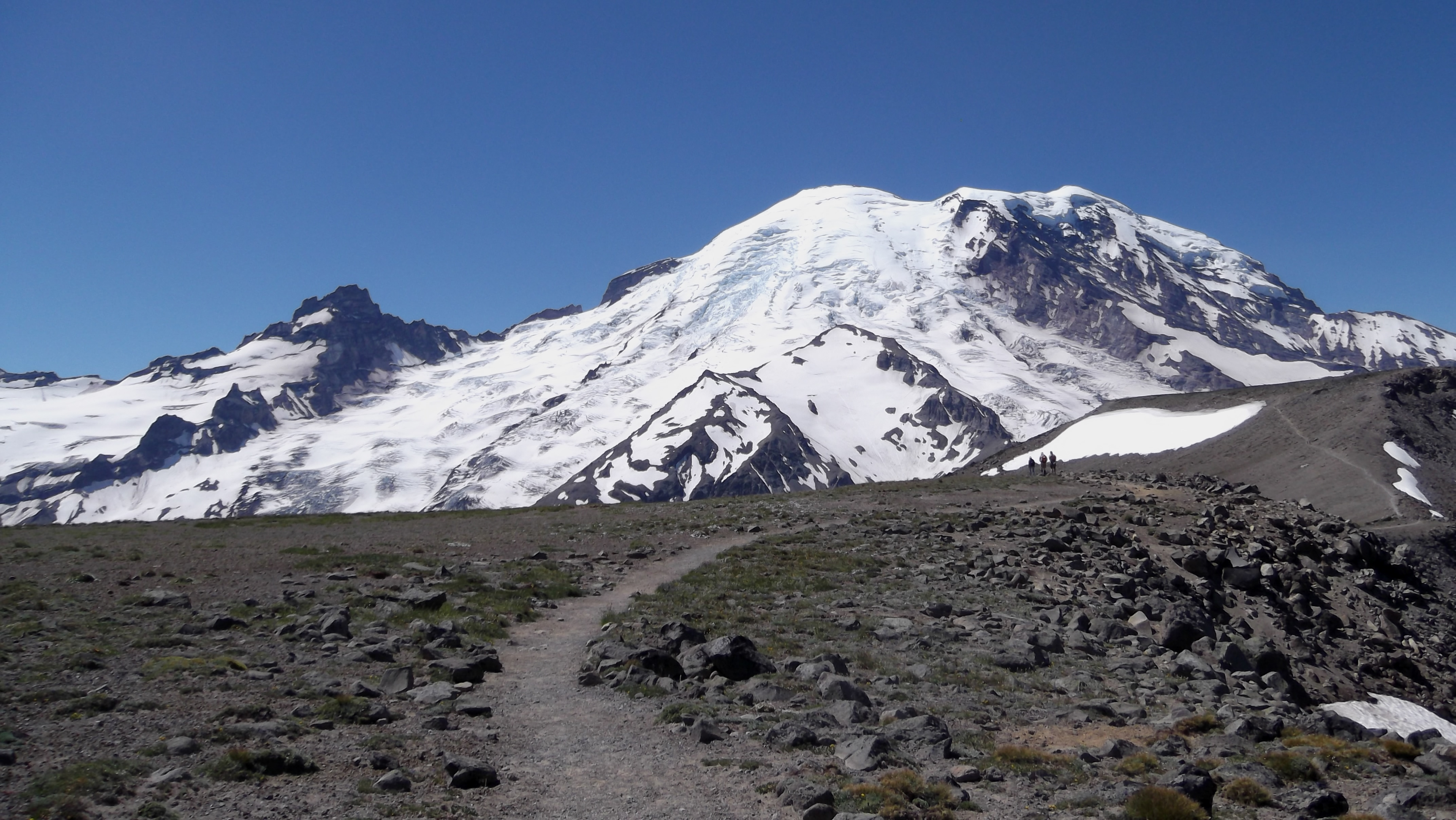
Top of First Burroughs Mountain view of Rainier

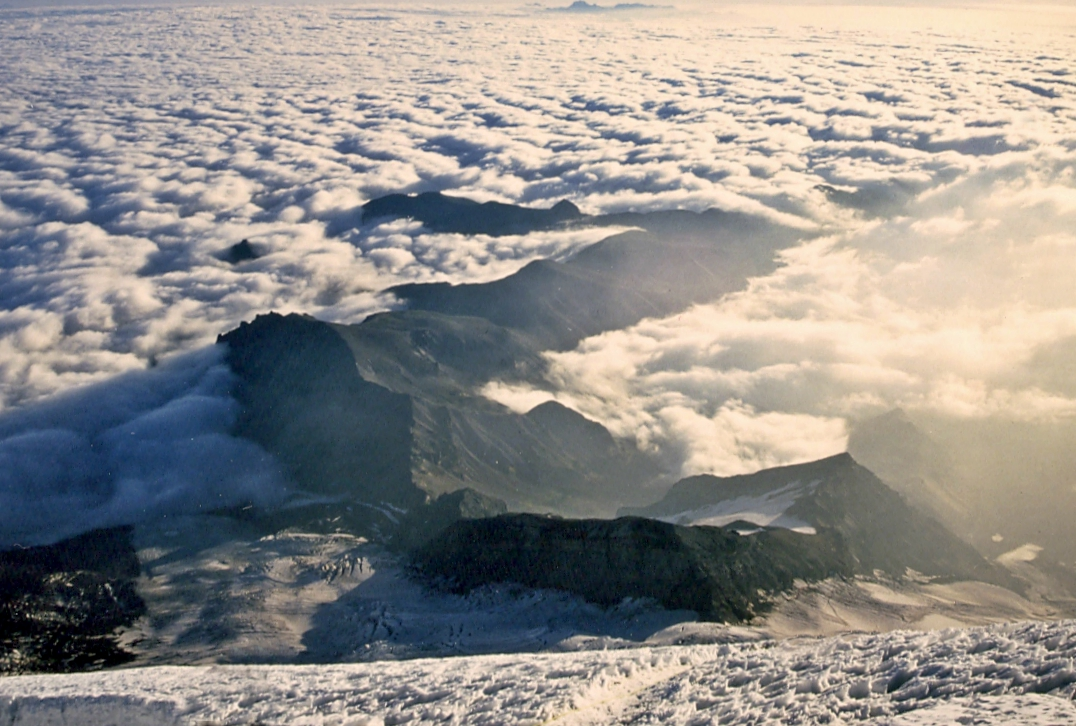
Burroughs Mountain above sea of clouds

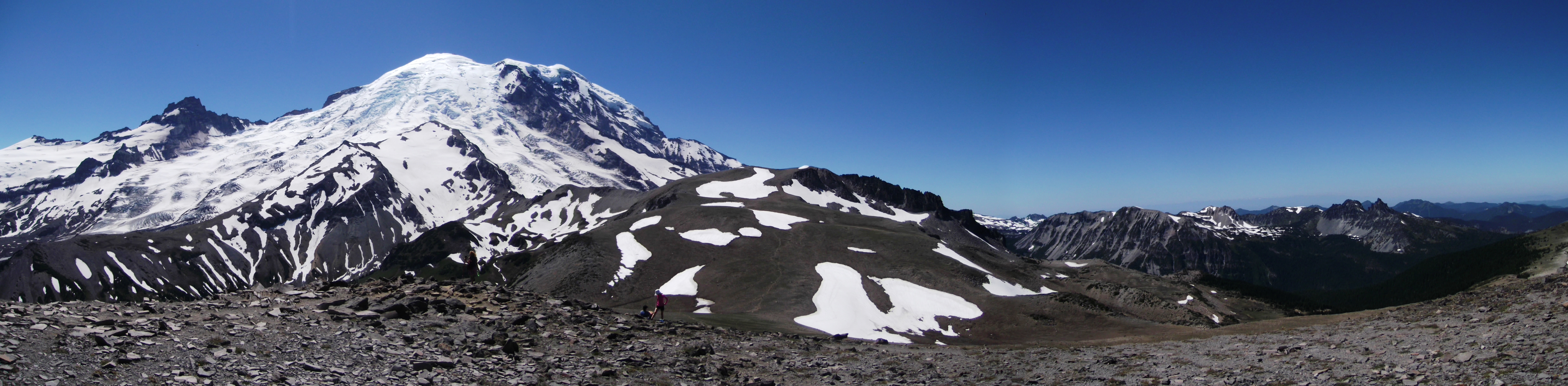
Panoramic of Mount Rainier from Second Burroughs

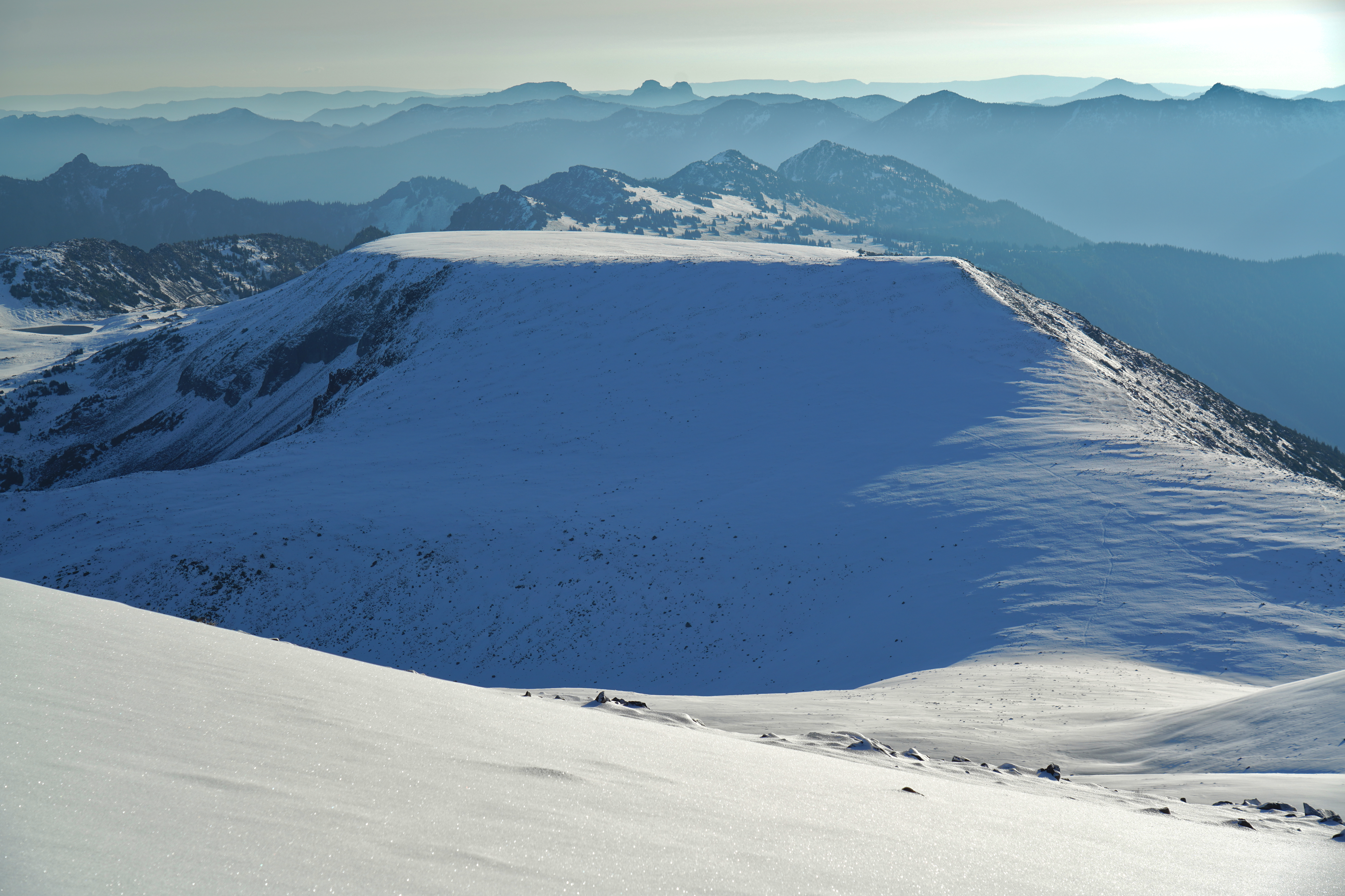
Second Burroughs viewed from Third Burroughs

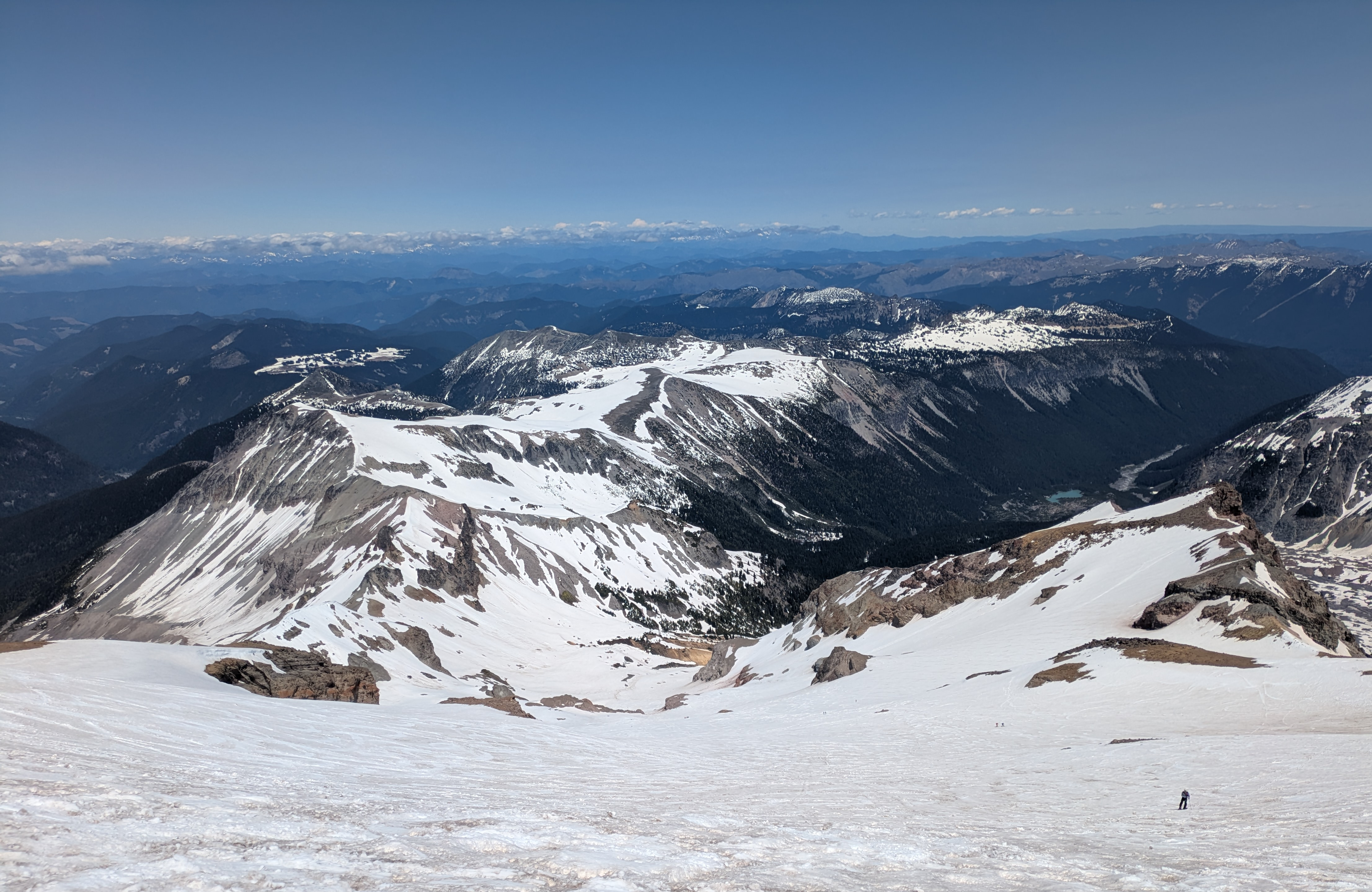
From Steamboat Prow looking down at snow-covered Burroughs Mountain (third, second, and first left to right) and Sunrise (farther right)

== See also ==
- Geography of Washington (state)
- Geology of the Pacific Northwest
