= Goat Island Mountain =

Mountain in Washington (state), United States

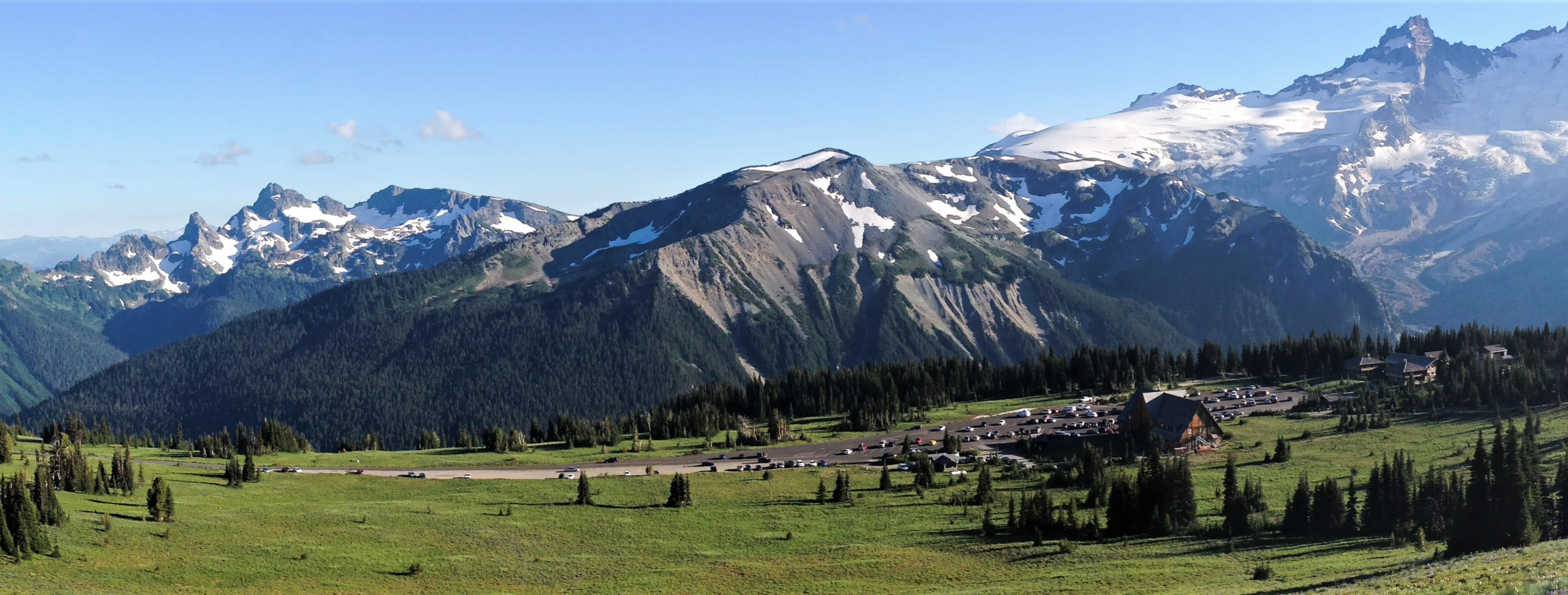
- Goat Island Mountain centered (Sunrise lower right, Little Tahoma upper right, Cowlitz Chimneys and Banshee Peak to left)

Highest point
- Elevation: 7,288 ft (2,221 m)
- Prominence: 888 ft (271 m)
- Parent peak: Little Tahoma Peak (11,138 ft)
- Isolation: 2.51 mi (4.04 km)
- Coordinates: 46°53′03″N 121°38′52″W

Geography
- Location within Washington (state) Location within the United States
- Country: United States
- State: Washington
- County: Pierce
- Protected area: Mount Rainier National Park
- Parent range: Cascades
- Topo map: USGS Sunrise

Climbing
- Easiest route: class 2 scrambling

Goat Island Mountain is a 7,288-foot (2,221 m) ridge-like mountain located in Mount Rainier National Park, in Pierce County of Washington state. It is part of the Cascade Range, and lies 5.76 mi (9.27 km) east-northeast of the summit of Mount Rainier. This mountain is quite visible from the Sunrise Historic District and the many trails surrounding the Sunrise area. The Wonderland Trail provides an approach to this mountain, and the summit offers views of Cowlitz Chimneys, Fryingpan Glacier, and Mount Rainier. Burroughs Mountain is its nearest higher neighbor, 2.51 mi (4.04 km) to the northwest. Precipitation runoff from Goat Island Mountain drains into the White River. The mountain's descriptive name derives from mountain goats that were often seen on the peak. The toponym was officially adopted in 1932 by the United States Board on Geographic Names.

== Climate ==
Goat Island Mountain is located in the marine west coast climate zone of western North America. Most weather fronts originating in the Pacific Ocean travel northeast toward the Cascade Mountains. As fronts approach, they are forced upward by the peaks of the Cascade Range (orographic lift), causing them to drop their moisture in the form of rain or snow onto the Cascades. As a result, the west side of the Cascades experiences high precipitation, especially during the winter months in the form of snowfall. Because of maritime influence, snow tends to be wet and heavy, resulting in high avalanche danger. During winter months, weather is usually cloudy, but due to high pressure systems over the Pacific Ocean that intensify during summer months, there is often little or no cloud cover during the summer. The months of July through September offer the most favorable weather for viewing or climbing this peak.

== Gallery ==
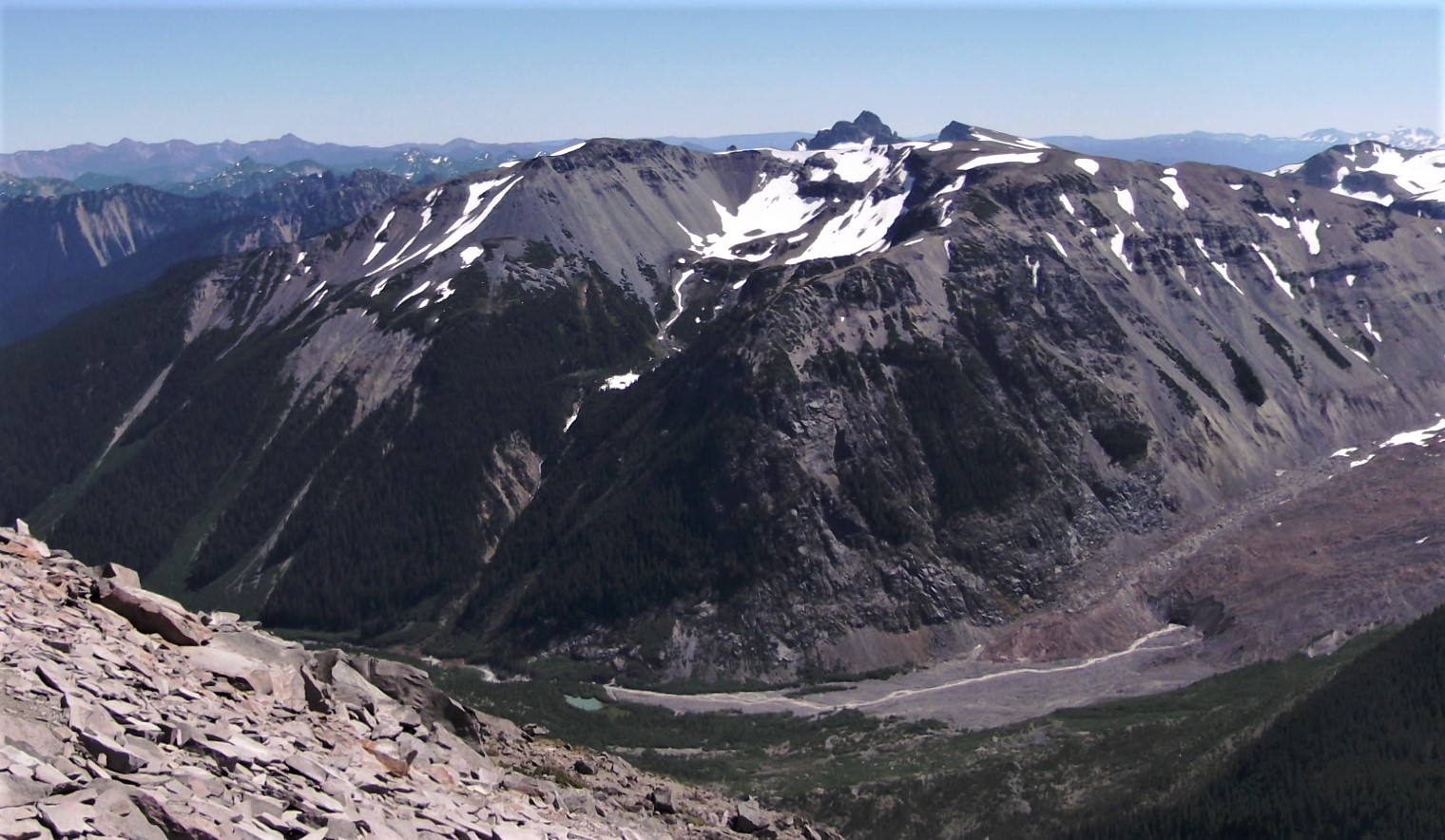
Goat Island Mountain from Second Burroughs Mountain

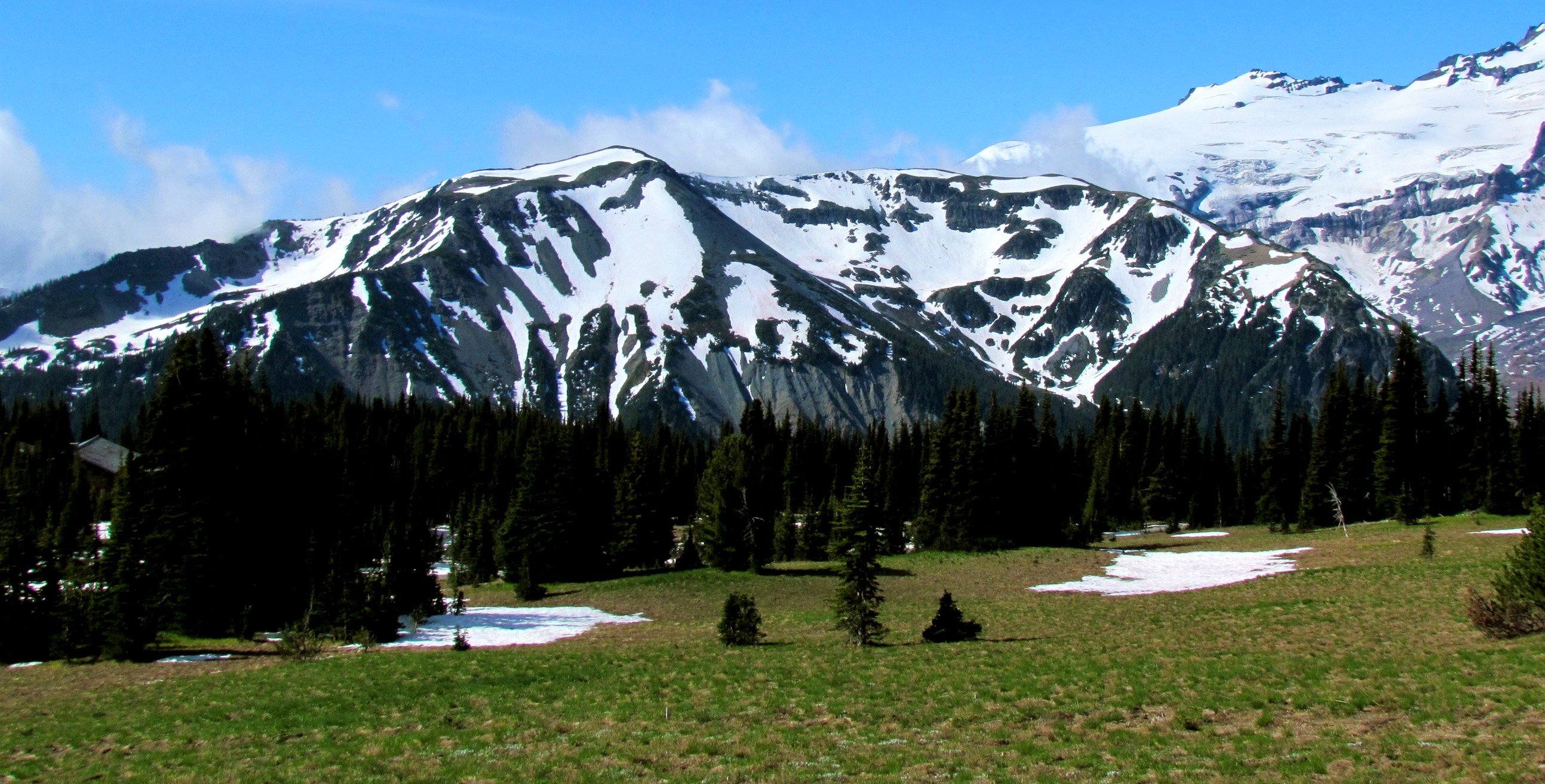
Goat Island Mountain from Sunrise area

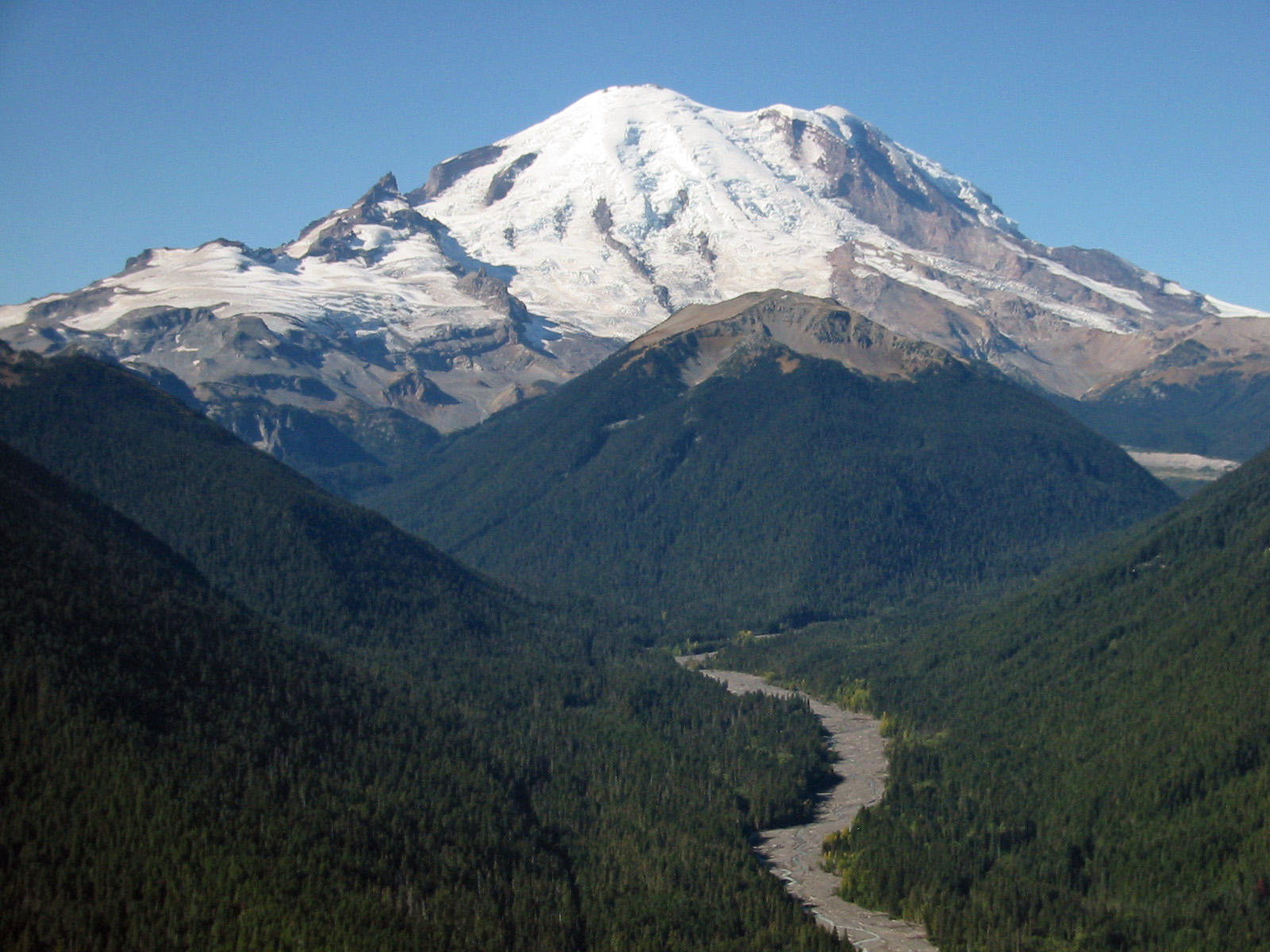
White River, Goat Island Mountain, and Mt. Rainier from the east

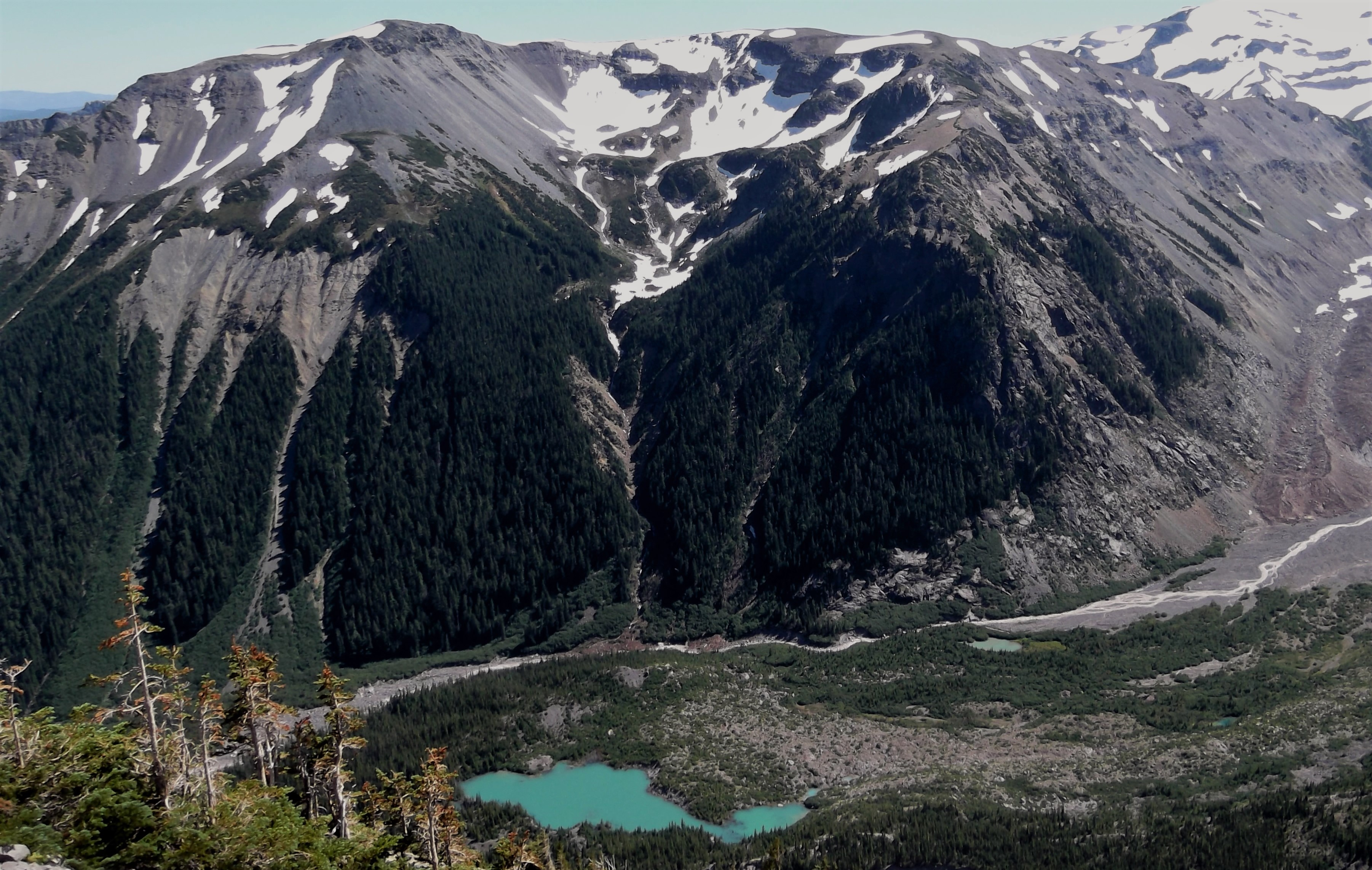
North aspect

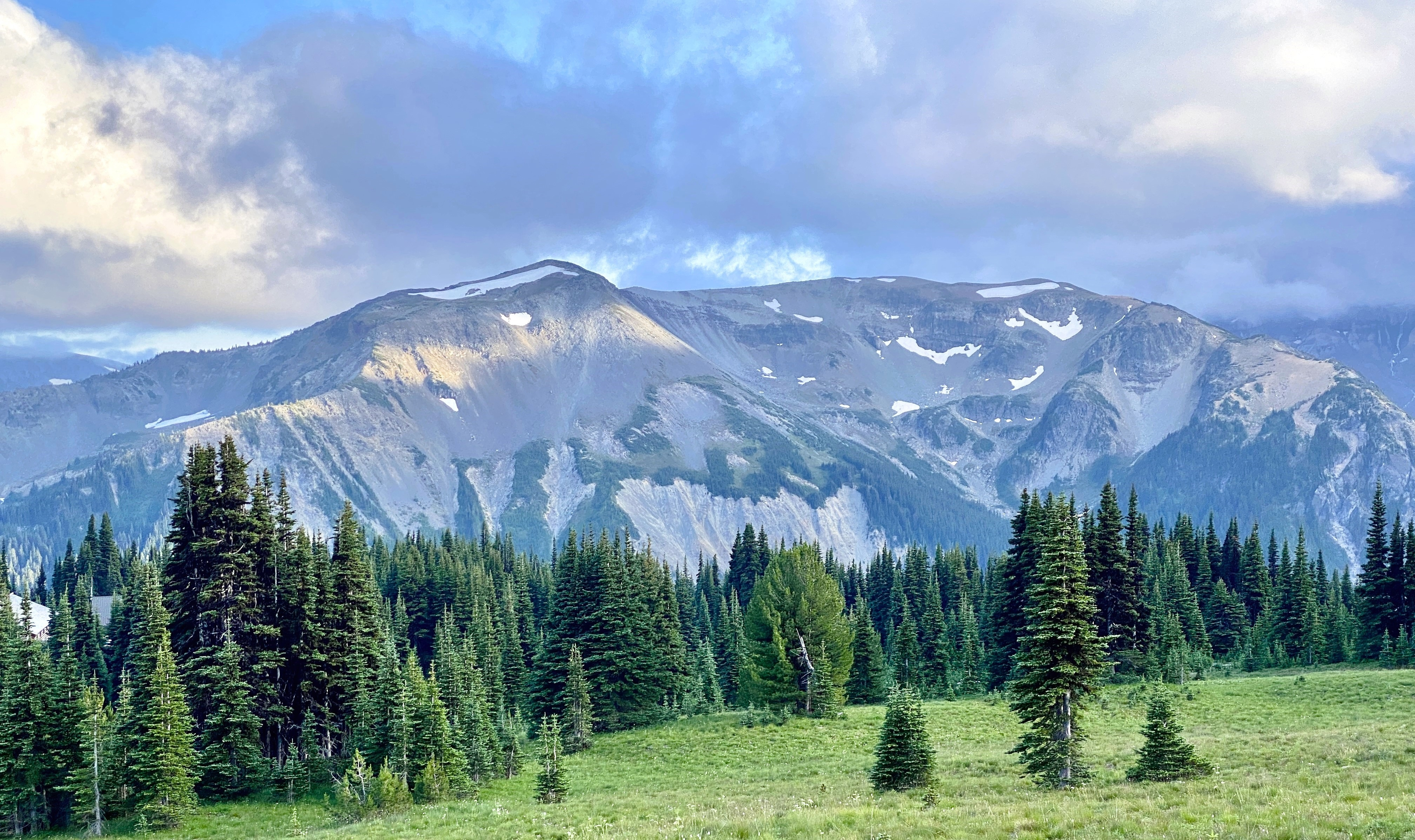
Goat Island Mountain viewed from Sourdough Ridge Trail

== See also ==
- Geology of the Pacific Northwest
