= Panhandle Gap =

Mountain pass in Washington, United States

Coordinates: 46°51′18″N 121°38′46″W

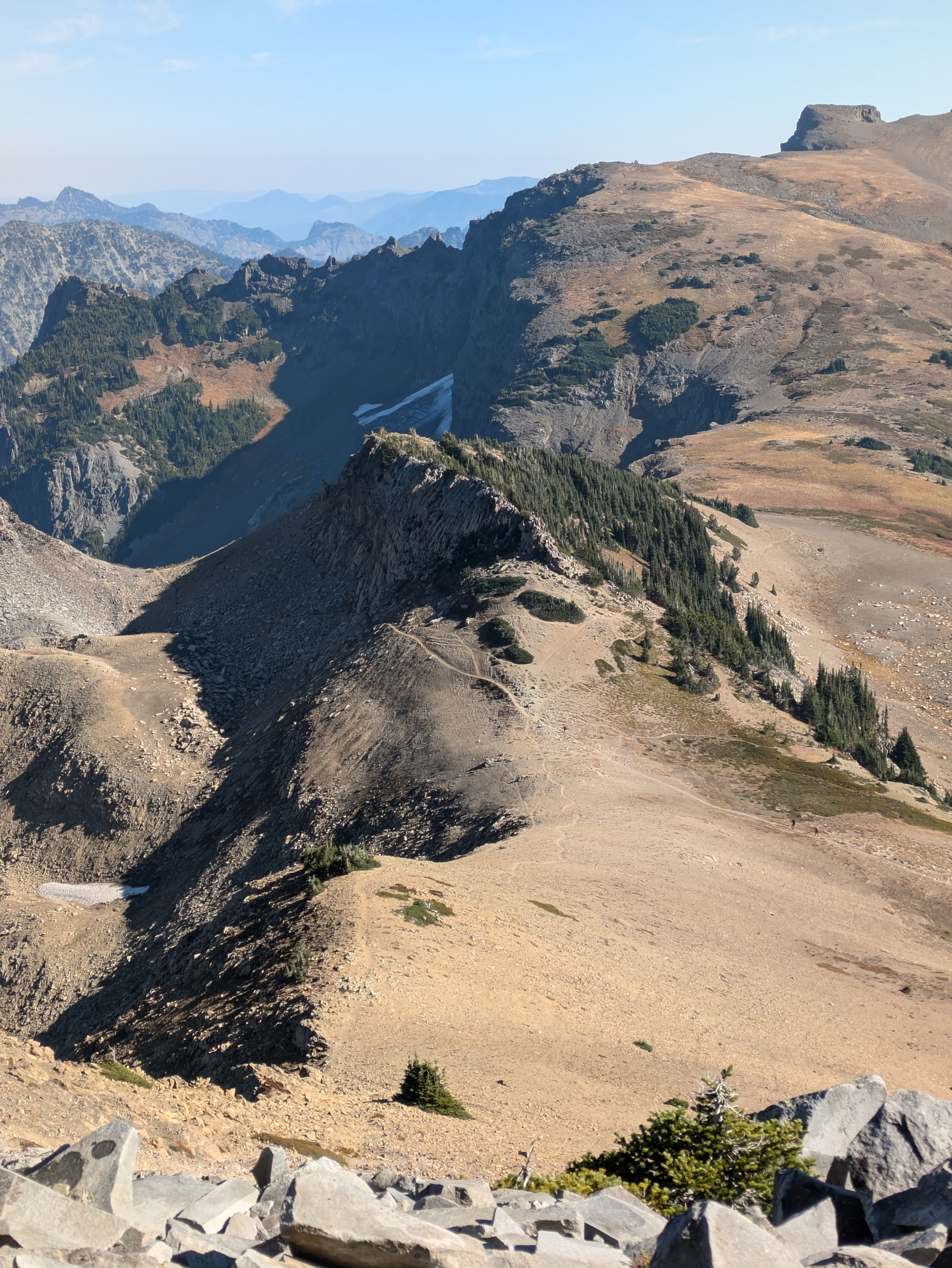
The Wonderland Trail crosses Panhandle Gap near the center of the image, taken from a knob to the west; in the upper right corner is the Banshee Peak massif above Sarvant Glacier (13 October 2024)

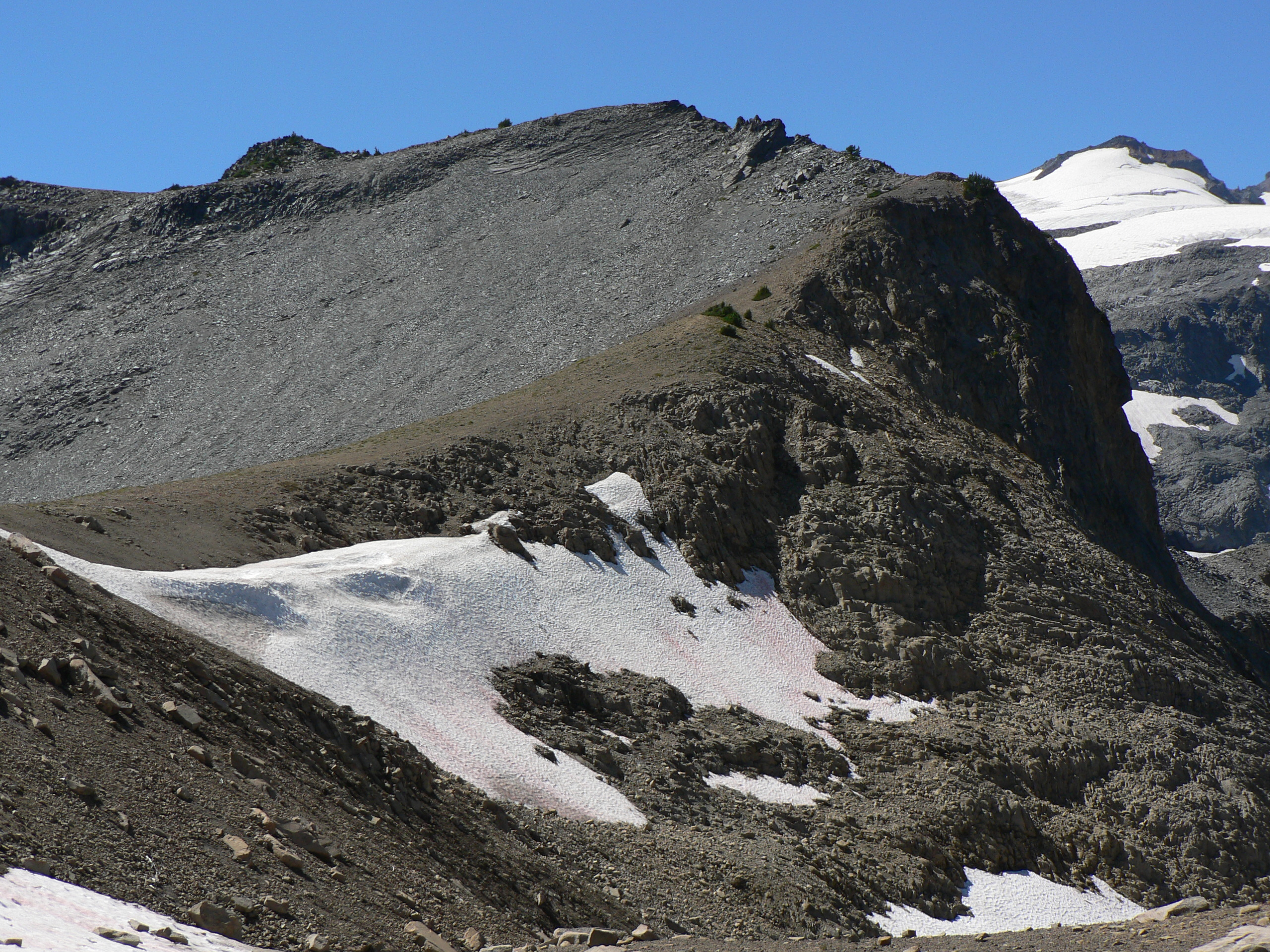
Snowfield covering Panhandle Gap (viewed from the northeast) on 24 August 2007

Panhandle Gap is a high pass in the U.S. state of Washington, on a ridge to the east of Mount Rainier, lying near the low point between Little Tahoma Peak and the Cowlitz Chimneys.

The hike to the gap along the Wonderland Trail, which can be joined 0.1 miles (0.16 km) from Fryingpan Creek Trailhead on Sunrise Road, has been described as "possibly the best day hike" in Mount Rainier National Park; it is 10.6 miles (17.1 km) roundtrip with 3,000 feet (910 m) of elevation gain. The hike is one of the most popular in the park, and can be crowded between late July and September, and it can be difficult to find parking at the trailhead. It has been rated both easy and strenuous. After Summerland—a campsite on a knob about 4 miles (6.4 km) from the trailhead and 1.3 miles (2.1 km) below Panhandle Gap—the trail can be hard to follow, crossing Fryingpan Creek can be hazardous, and in winter and spring there can also be avalanche risk approaching the gap. At around 6,750 feet (2,060 m), the gap is the highest point on the Wonderland Trail encircling the mountain. South of the gap, the Wonderland Trail continues towards Indian Bar and Box Canyon, as the terrain drops off into Ohanapecosh Park, which drains into the Ohanapecosh River. The most popular climbing routes to Banshee Peak and the Cowlitz Chimneys arrive via Panhandle Gap, and while Banshee is a walk-up, the Middle Cowlitz Chimney can be climbed using a Class 2 scrambling route and the Main Chimney is Class 3. On a clear day, Mount Adams is visible from Panhandle Gap, but Mount Rainier itself is largely blocked by the ridge to the west. Some through-hikers deviate to the Eastside Trail, an alternate route to avoid snow and potentially dangerous conditions around the gap.

Panhandle Gap is above the tree line and the terrain largely consists of rock and ice past Summerland. The rock around the gap—partly consisting of hypersthene hornblende dacite that may have formed by Tatoosh intrusion as well as andesite—is more red than that found a short distance to the north, closer to Summerland. Snow often covers the trail around the gap into late summer. Species found at the gap include horned lark, ptarmigan, mountain goats, Smelowskia, and Tolmie's saxifrage.

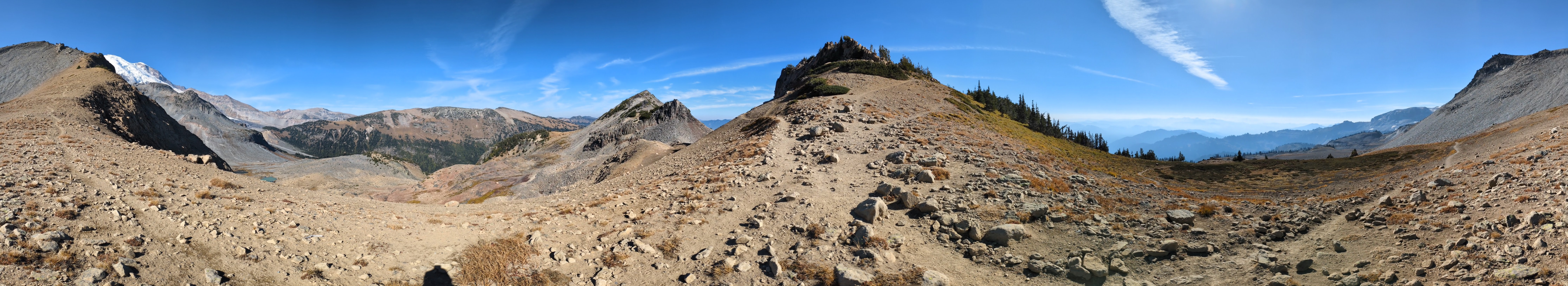
Panoramic view from Panhandle Gap; image starts to the west (13 October 2024)
