= Sunrise Road =

Road in Washington, United States

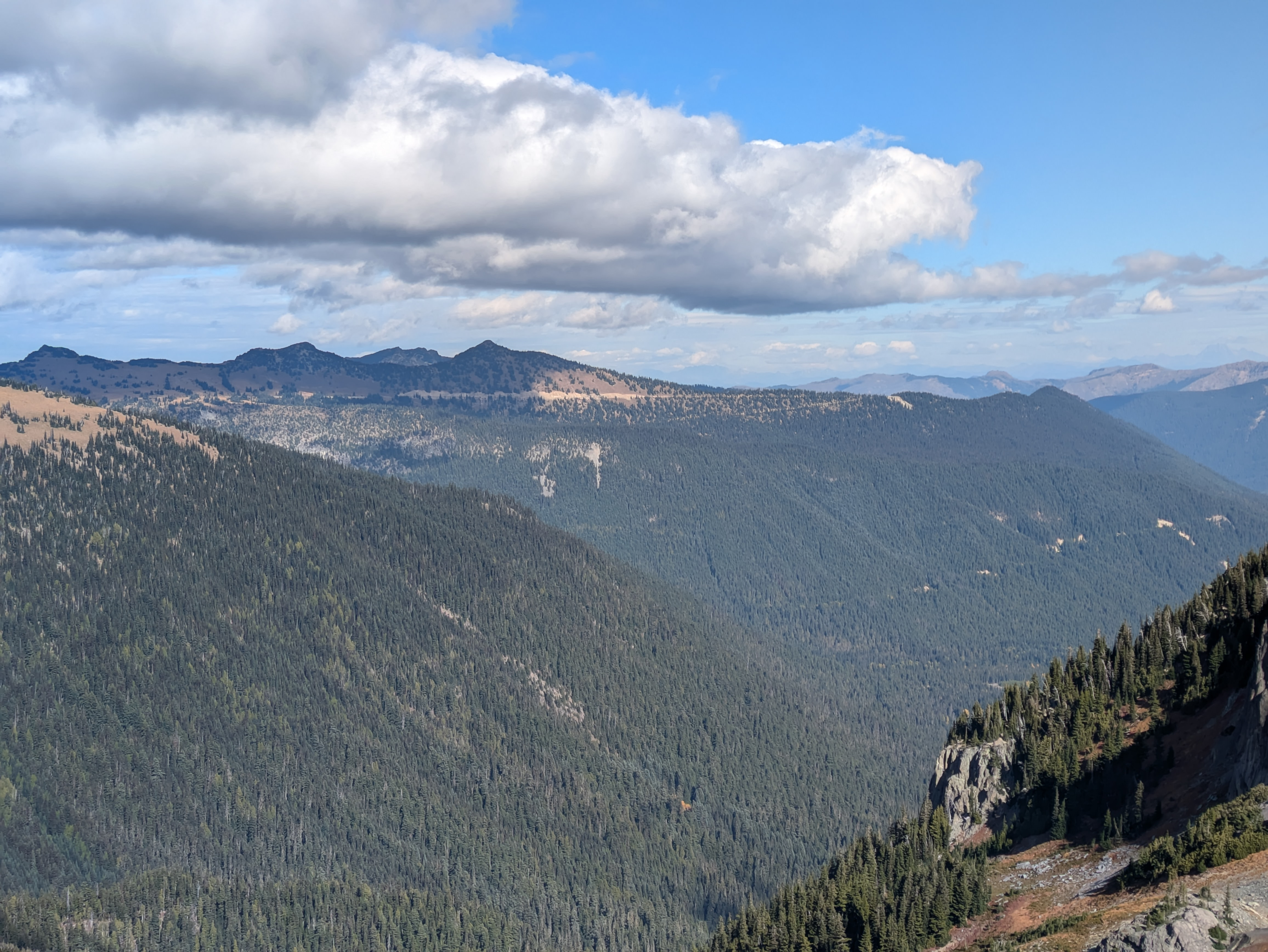
View of Sunrise Road from just west of Banshee Peak on 14 October 2024; Sunrise Road is already closed and White River Road was closed later that day. Yakima Park is the meadow near the top of the ridge, and White River Road runs through the valley below.

White River Road and Sunrise Road, together formerly known as the Yakima Park Highway, is a road that enters Mount Rainier National Park in the northeast and connects Mather Memorial Parkway to White River Campground and Sunrise, located in Yakima Park. It was surveyed in 1926 and built between 1927 or 1929 and 1931. Landscape architect Ernest A. Davidson was involved in its construction; it was one of the first roads to have scenic pullouts, viewpoints, and retaining walls built with rocks that blended in with the landscape. At 6,400 feet, Sunrise is still the highest point in the national park accessible by road.
