= Sarvant =

Sarvant may refer to:

- Sarvant Glacier
- Adam Sarvant
