= Sunrise Comfort Station =

- U.S. National Register of Historic Places
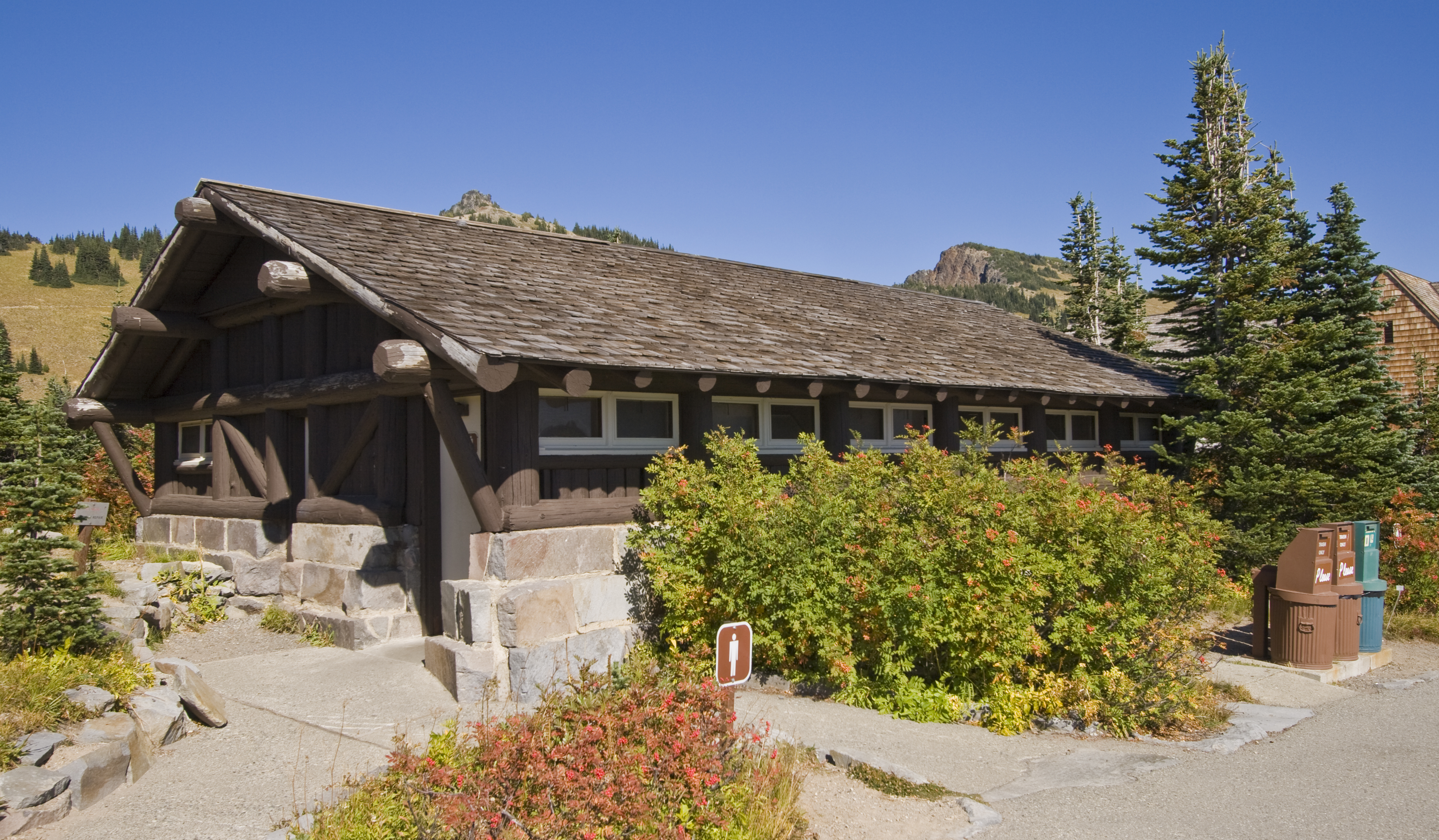

- Location within Washington (state)
- Nearest city: Sunrise, Washington
- Coordinates: 46°54′40″N 121°39′36″W
- Area: less than one acre
- Built: circa 1930
- MPS: Mt. Rainier National Park MPS
- NRHP reference No.: 91000207
- Added to NRHP: March 13, 1991

The Sunrise Comfort Station (S-310) is a comfort station in Mount Rainier National Park, Washington, USA. Built around 1930, the building was designed by Thomas Chalmers Vint of the National Park Service in association with landscape architect E.A. Davidson. The structure was part of a planned ensemble at what was then called Yakima Park, high on the northern flank of Mount Rainier. Similar structures may be found at the Ohanapecosh, Longmire and White River campgrounds in the park. The low building is framed in peeled logs on a stone foundation, set into a hillside and surrounded by native landscaping.

The "comfort station", otherwise known as a public toilet, was placed on the National Register of Historic Places on March 13, 1991. It is part of the Mount Rainier National Historic Landmark District, which encompasses the entire park and which recognizes the park's inventory of Park Service-designed rustic architecture. Another comfort station (S-005) situated between the Yakima Park Stockade Group and the Sunrise Lodge is not part of that district but contributes to the Sunrise Historic District instead. S-310 does not.

== See also ==
- Longmire Campground Comfort Stations
- Tipsoo Lake Comfort Station
