= Tipsoo Lake Comfort Station =

- U.S. National Register of Historic Places
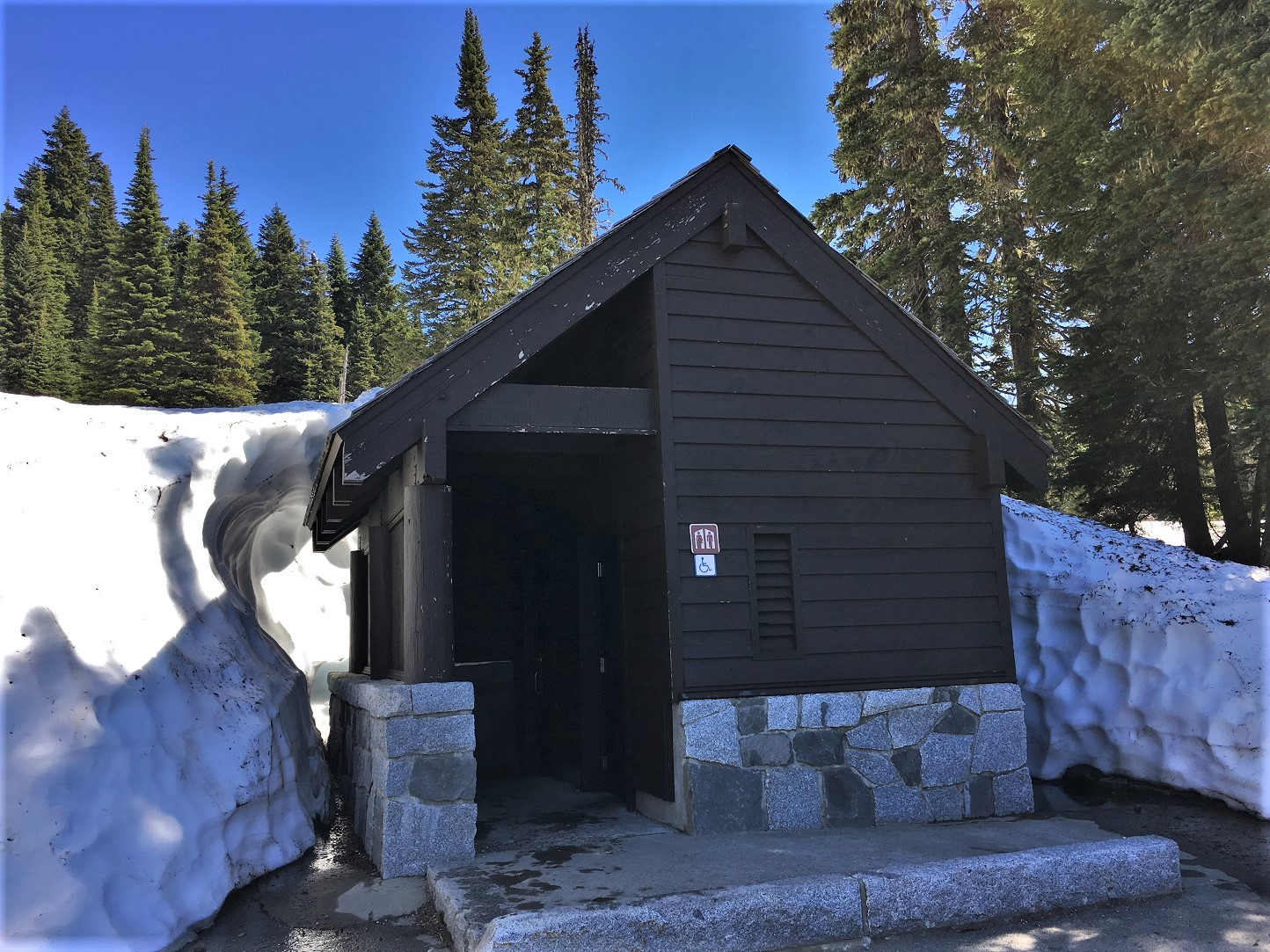

- Location within Washington (state)
- Nearest city: Chinook Pass, Washington
- Coordinates: 46°52′13″N 121°31′9″W
- Area: less than one acre
- Built: 1934
- Architectural style: Rustic style
- MPS: Mt. Rainier National Park MPS
- NRHP reference No.: 91000206
- Added to NRHP: March 13, 1991

The Tipsoo Lake Comfort Station was designed by the National Park Service Branch of Plans and Designs in the National Park Service Rustic style and built in Mount Rainier National Park by the Civilian Conservation Corps in 1934. The design was supervised by Park Service Chief Architect Thomas Chalmers Vint, and is similar to the Sunrise Comfort Station in the central portion of the park. Located near the park's northern entrance, two comfort station were planned to be part of a developed area in the vicinity of Tipsoo and Chinook Pass, which was never developed beyond the toilet facilities and an entrance arch. One of these survives and remains in use. The public toilet facility features rough stonework to window sill level, with a framed wall above and a log-framed roof with cedar shingles.

The Tipsoo Lake Comfort Station was placed on the National Register of Historic Places on March 13, 1991. It is part of the Mount Rainier National Historic Landmark District, which encompasses the entire park and which recognizes the park's inventory of Park Service-designed rustic architecture.
