= Banshee Peak =

Mountain in Washington (state), United States

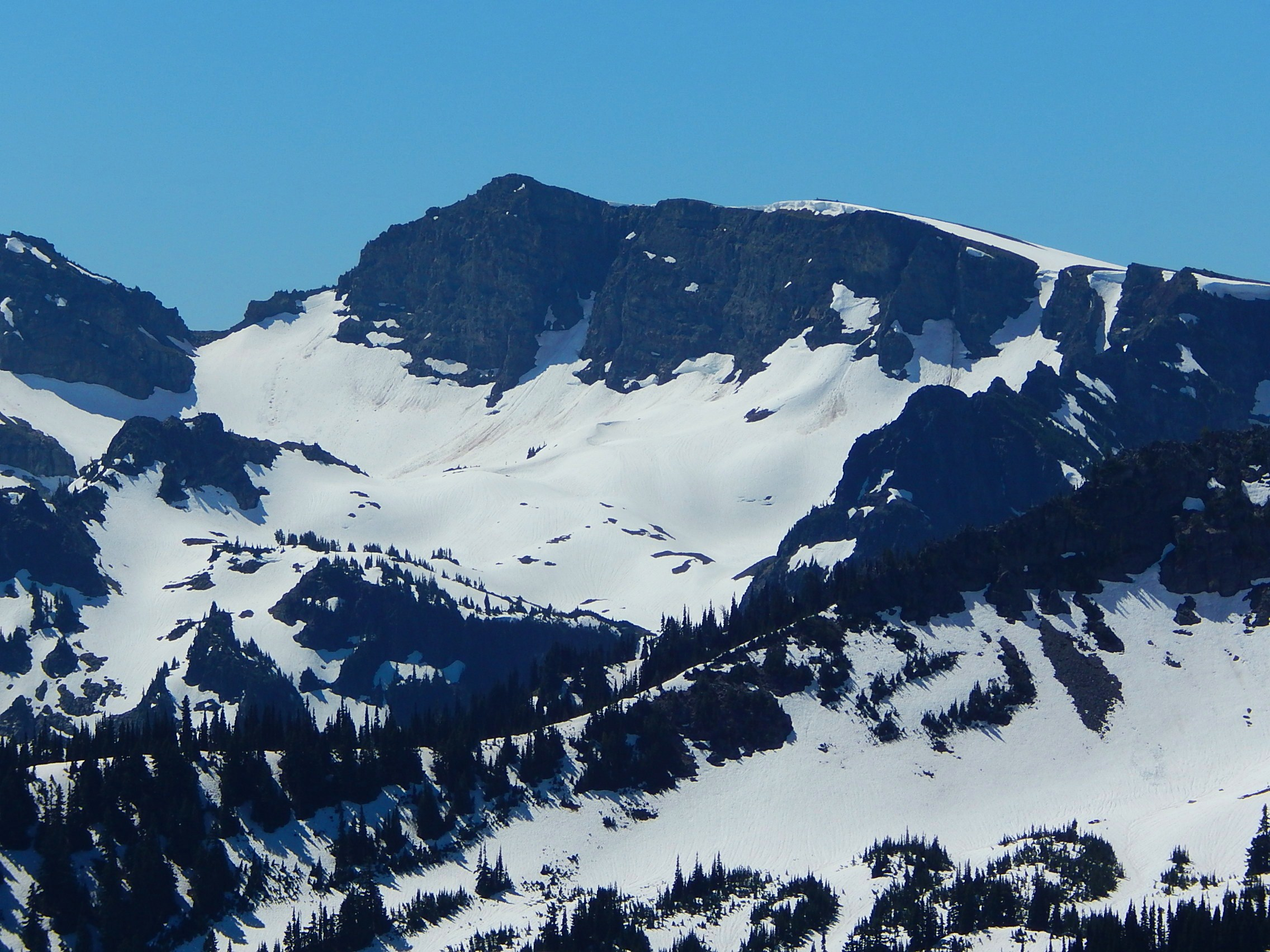
- Banshee Peak seen from Sunrise area

Highest point
- Elevation: 7,420 ft (2,262 m)
- Prominence: 400 ft (122 m)
- Parent peak: Cowlitz Chimneys
- Isolation: 0.40 mi (0.64 km)
- Coordinates: 46°51′04″N 121°37′14″W

Geography
- Location within Washington (state) Location within the United States
- Country: United States
- State: Washington
- County: Pierce
- Protected area: Mount Rainier National Park
- Parent range: Cascade Range
- Topo map: USGS Chinook Pass

Geology
- Rock type: Volcanic rock

Climbing
- Easiest route: Scrambling class 2

Banshee Peak is a 7,420-foot (2,262-metre) mountain summit located in Mount Rainier National Park in Pierce County of Washington state, US. As part of the Cascade Range, Banshee Peak is situated west of the Cowlitz Chimneys and east of Panhandle Gap, with the Sarvant Glacier set below its north cliff. Precipitation runoff from Banshee Peak drains into tributaries of the White River and the Cowlitz River. Banshee Peak is a high remnant of bedded Ohanapecosh Formation lava flows. Access is from Panhandle Gap via the Wonderland Trail. The broad summit has alpine tundra similar to that found on Burroughs Mountain. The Sunrise Historic District provides a viewpoint from which to see Banshee Peak when weather permits. The road to Sunrise is only open seasonally in the summer due to closure from winter snowpack.

== Climate ==
Banshee Peak is located in the marine west coast climate zone of western North America. Weather fronts originating in the Pacific Ocean travel northeast toward the Cascade Mountains. As fronts approach, they are forced upward by the peaks of the Cascade Range (orographic lift), causing them to drop their moisture in the form of rain or snow onto the Cascades. As a result, the west side of the Cascades experiences high precipitation, especially during the winter months in the form of snowfall. Because of maritime influence, snow tends to be wet and heavy, resulting in high avalanche danger. During winter months, weather is usually cloudy, but due to high pressure systems over the Pacific Ocean that intensify during summer months, there is often little or no cloud cover during the summer.

== See also ==
- Geology of the Pacific Northwest

== Gallery ==
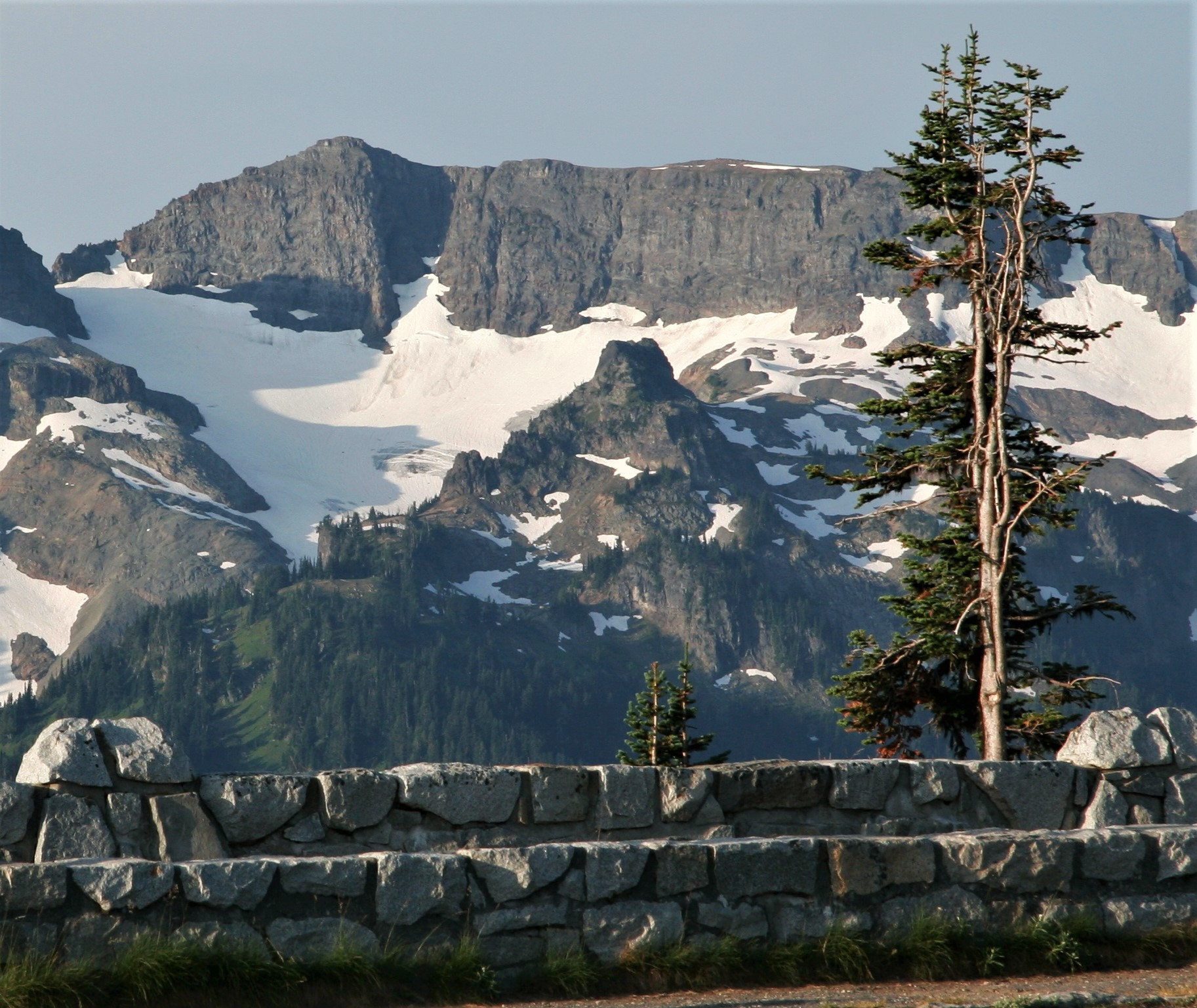
Banshee Peak from Sunrise Point

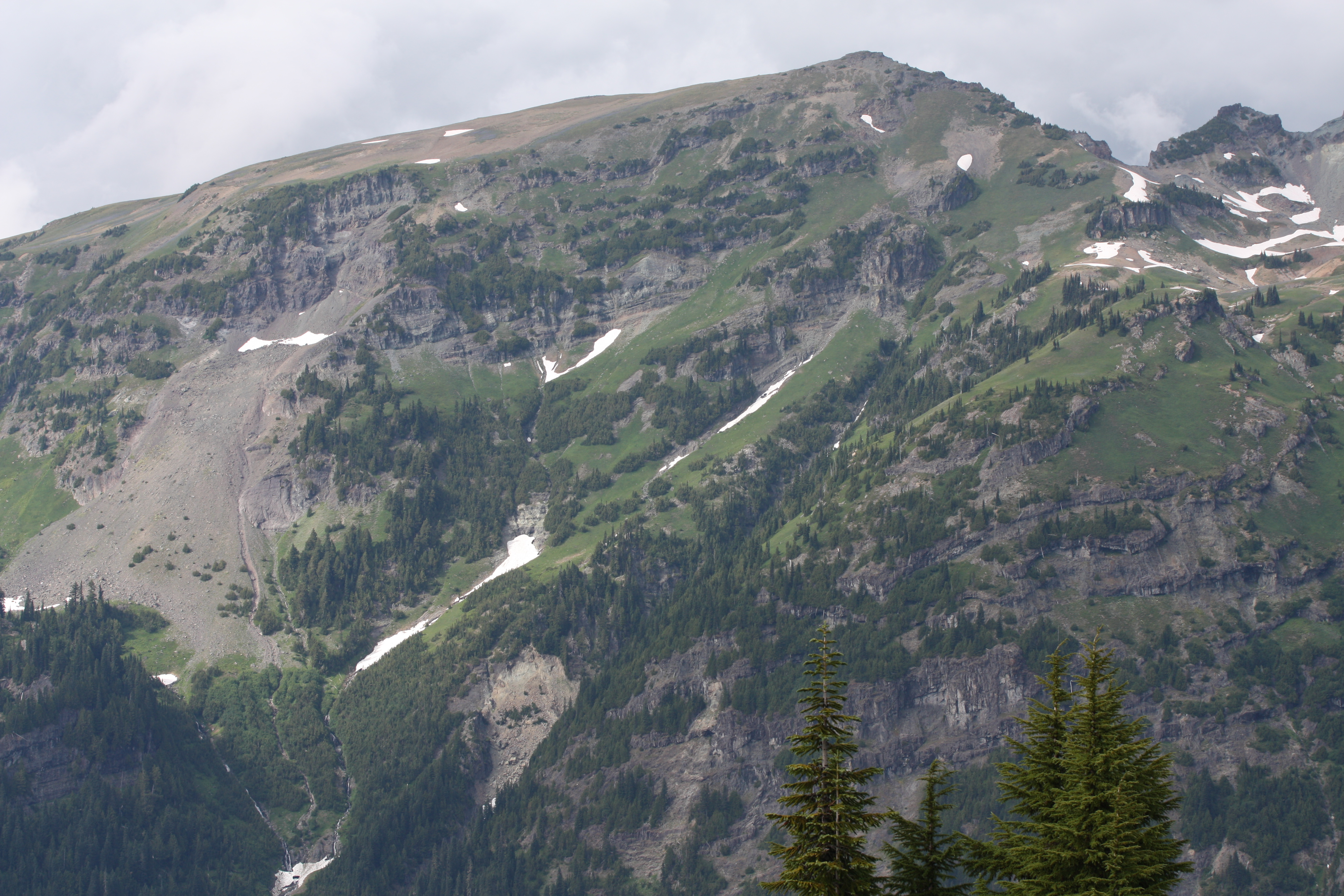
Banshee Peak, south aspect

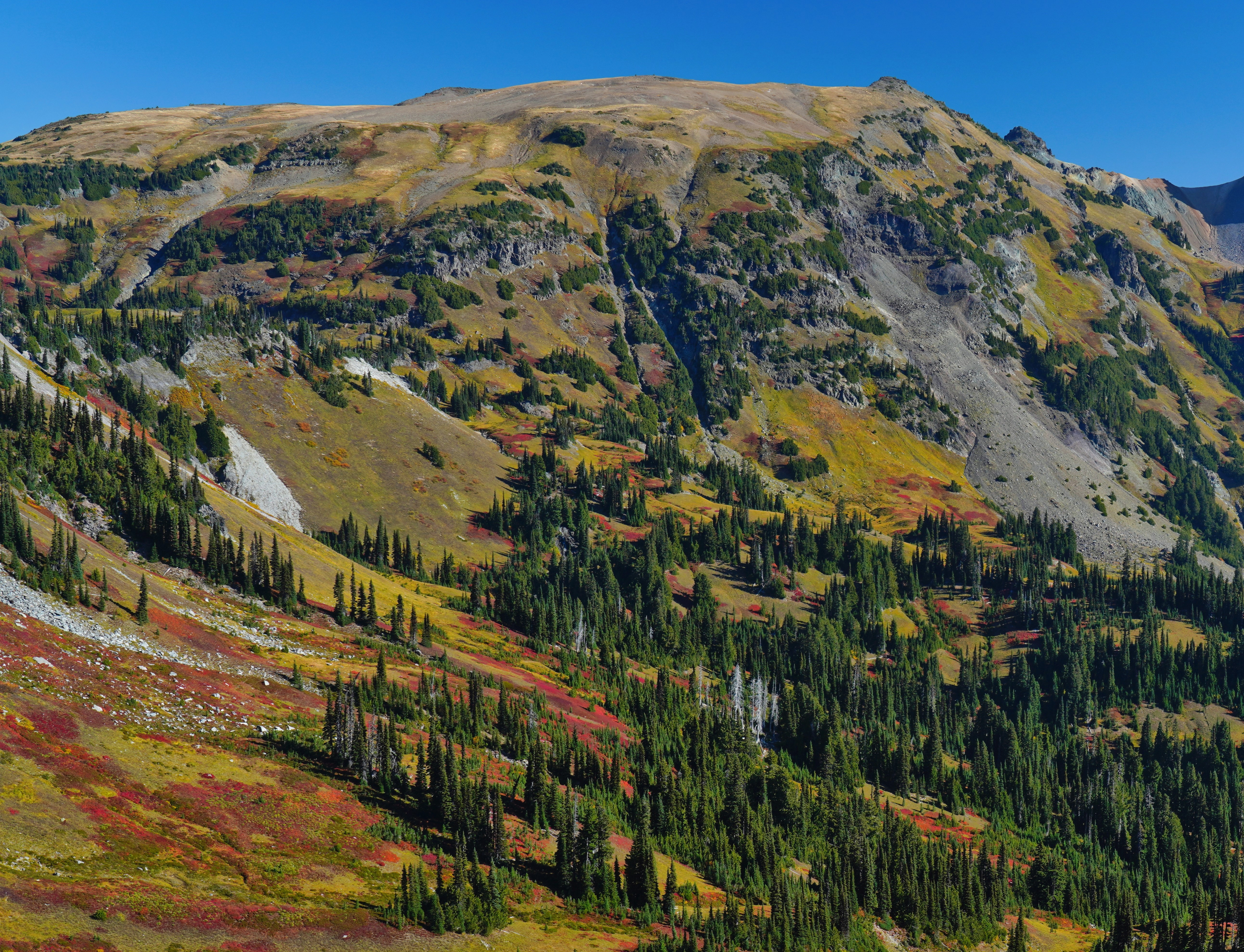
Southwest aspect

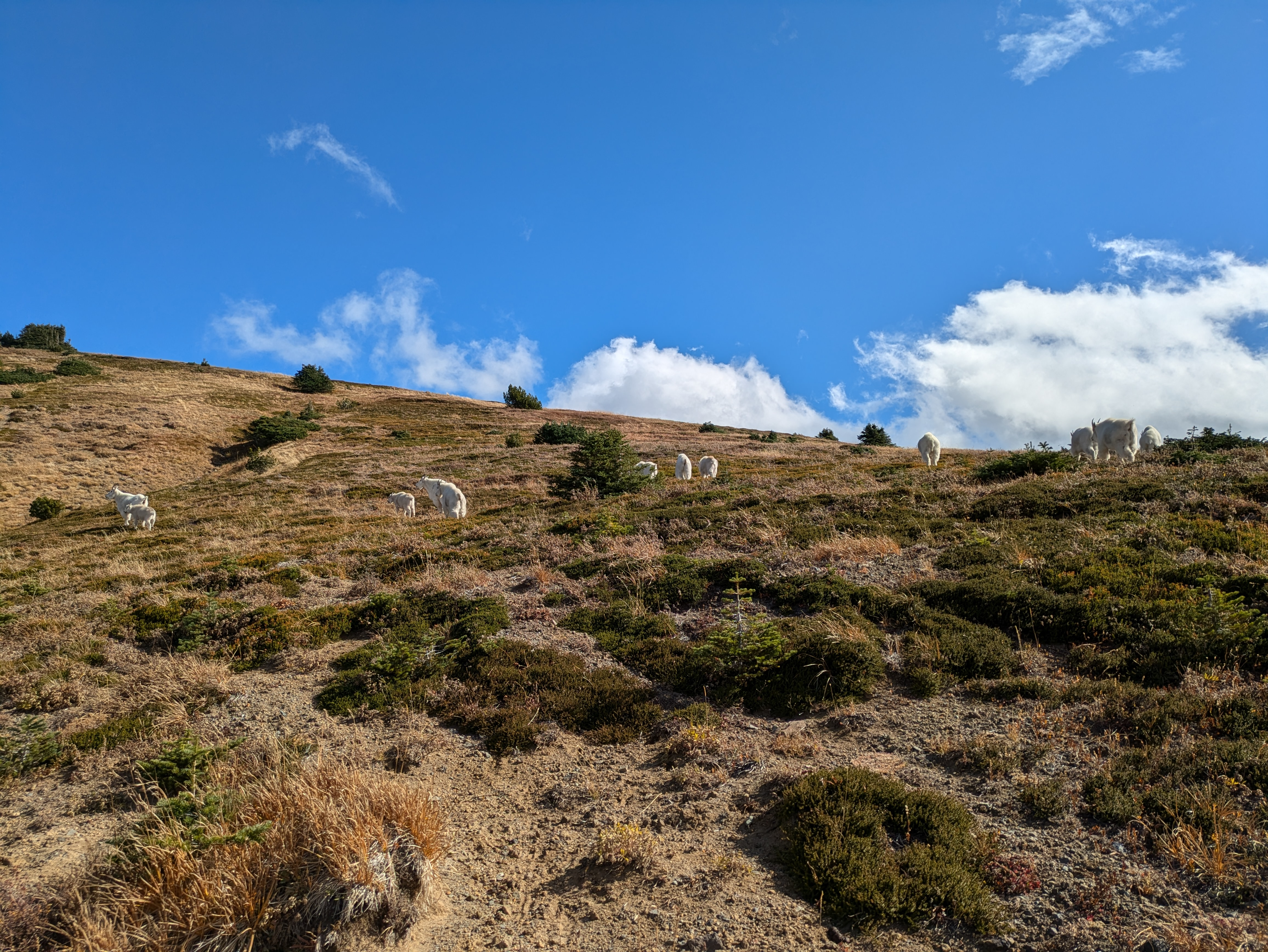
Mountain goats on Banshee Peak
