= Ernest Davidson =

Ernest Davidson may refer to:

- Ernest R. Davidson (born 1936), professor of chemistry
- Ernest A. Davidson, American architect
