= Cowlitz Chimneys =

Mountains in Washington (state), United States

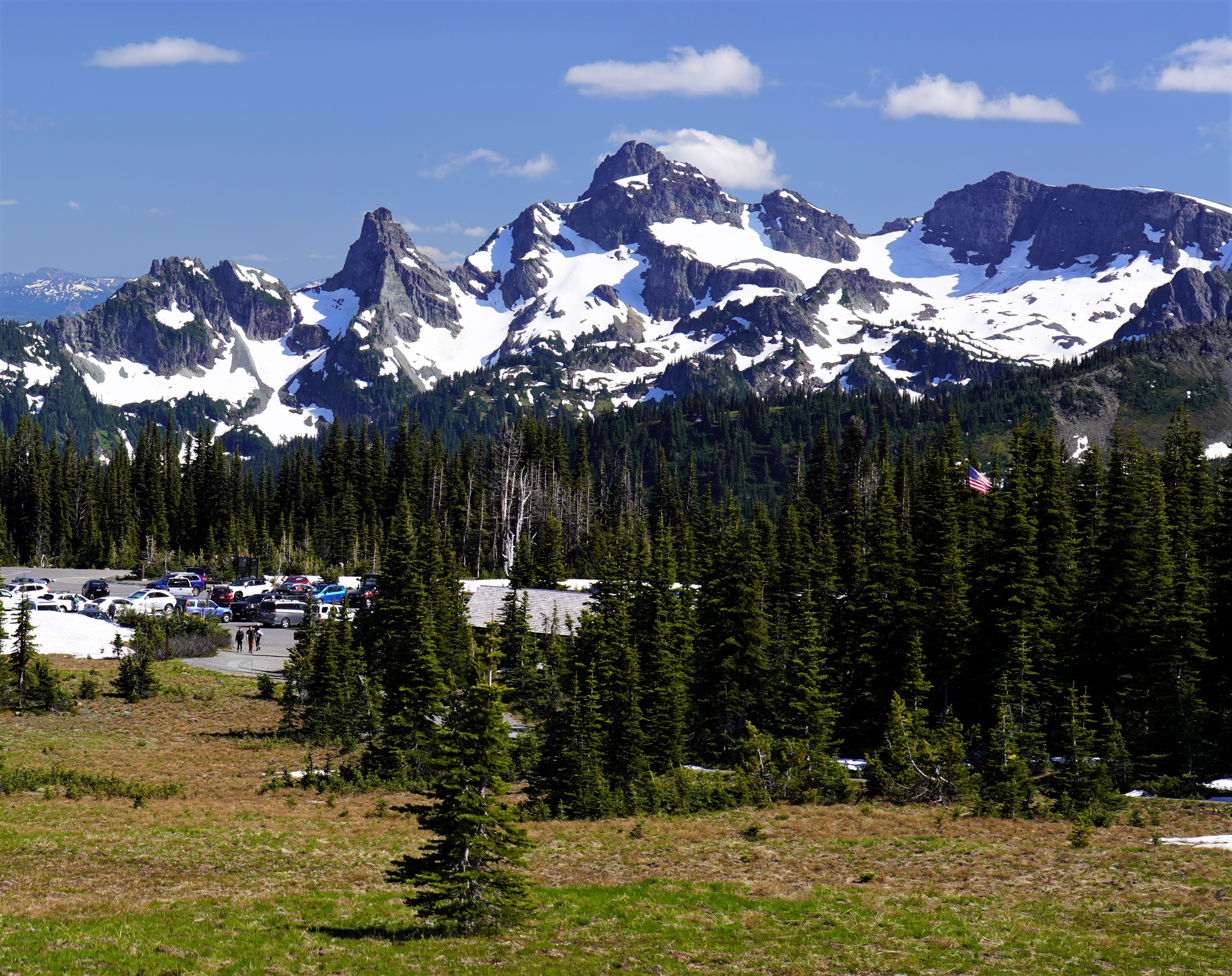
- Cowlitz Chimneys from near Sunrise

Highest point
- Elevation: 7,605 ft (2,318 m)
- Prominence: 965 ft (294 m)
- Parent peak: Little Tahoma Peak (11,138 ft)
- Isolation: 4.84 mi (7.79 km)
- Coordinates: 46°50′56″N 121°36′34″W

Geography
- Location within Washington (state) Location within the United States
- Country: United States
- State: Washington
- County: Pierce
- Protected area: Mount Rainier National Park
- Parent range: Cascades
- Topo map: USGS Chinook Pass

Geology
- Rock type: Rhyolite

Climbing
- First ascent: 1915 by The Mountaineers
- Easiest route: Scrambling class 3

Cowlitz Chimneys are a group of four rhyolite towers located in Mount Rainier National Park in Pierce County of Washington state. As part of the Cascade Range, the Cowlitz Chimneys are situated southwest of Tamanos Mountain and east of Banshee Peak, all of which are visible from the Sunrise Historic District. The Sarvant Glacier is set on the north aspect of these remnants of a volcanic plug. Cowlitz is the name of several geographical features in Mount Rainier National Park, as well as the state of Washington. The name appeared as early as the Lewis and Clark journals of 1805 when it was written as "Cowliskee" and has the Chinook Jargon meaning of "capturing the medicine spirit".

- Main (South) Cowlitz Chimney - 7,605 ft
- Central Cowlitz Chimney - 7,421 ft
- North Cowlitz Chimney - 7,015 ft
- Third Cowlitz Chimney - 6,640+ ft

== Climate ==
The Cowlitz Chimneys are located in the marine west coast climate zone of western North America. Most weather fronts originating in the Pacific Ocean travel northeast toward the Cascade Mountains. As fronts approach, they are forced upward by the peaks of the Cascade Range (orographic lift), causing them to drop their moisture in the form of rain or snow onto the Cascades. As a result, the west side of the Cascades experiences high precipitation, especially during the winter months in the form of snowfall. Because of maritime influence, snow tends to be wet and heavy, resulting in high avalanche danger. During winter months, weather is usually cloudy, but due to high pressure systems over the Pacific Ocean that intensify during summer months, there is often little or no cloud cover during the summer. Precipitation runoff from Cowlitz Chimneys drains into the Cowlitz River.

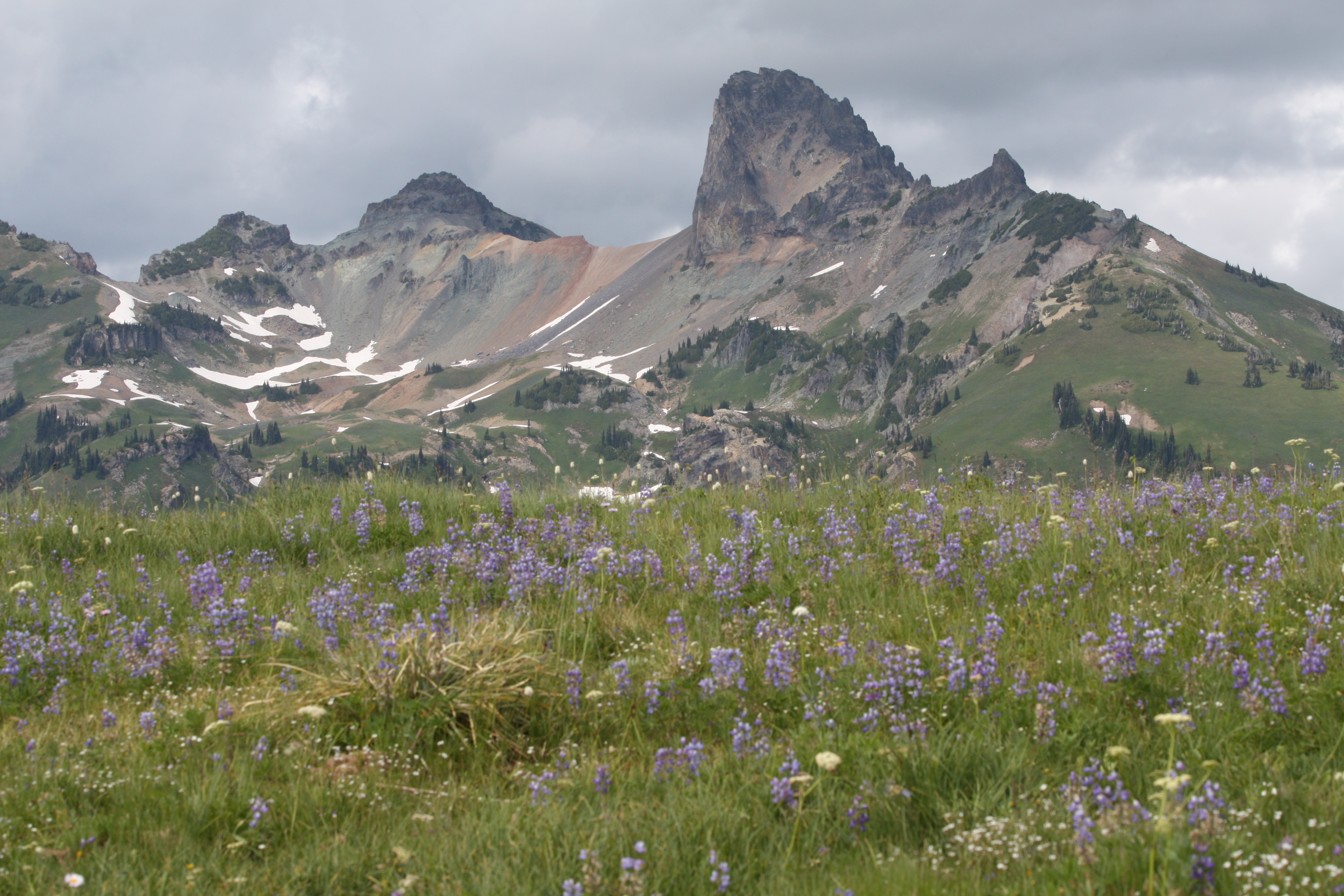
Cowlitz Chimneys from the Cowlitz Divide (south)

== See also ==
- Geography of Washington (state)
- Geology of the Pacific Northwest
