= Sarvant Glacier =

Glacier in Washington, United States

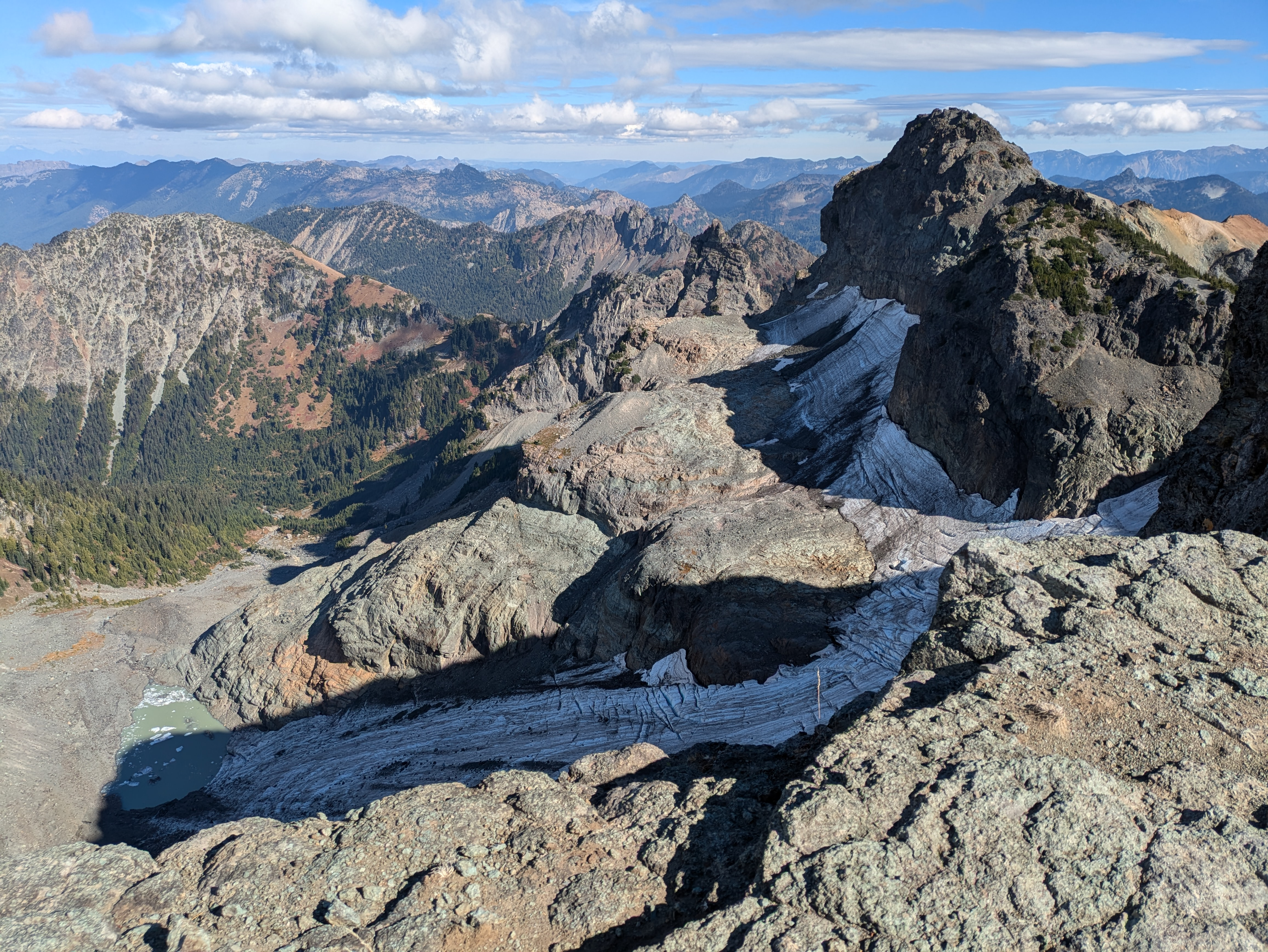
- The glacier below Cowlitz Chimneys from the ridge west of Banshee Peak, October 2024
- Interactive map of Sarvant Glacier
- Type: Mountain glacier
- Location: Cowlitz Chimneys, Mount Rainier National Park, Pierce County, Washington, USA
- Coordinates: 46°51′16″N 121°37′8″W
- Status: Retreating or Extinct

The Sarvant Glacier is a glacier located on the northern slopes of the Cowlitz Chimneys in the state of Washington. Named for Henry M. Sarvant, who mapped Mount Rainier in 1894, the glacier starts at an elevation of about 7,000 feet (2,100 m) and descends northward down to 6,100 ft (1,900 m). There are several patches of permanent ice and snow that lie to the east and west of the glacier. These range in elevation from about 7,000 ft (2,100 m) to 5,700 ft (1,700 m). The patches of ice and snow to the west are labeled Sarvant Glaciers.

== See also ==
- List of glaciers
