= Wonderland Trail =

Trail in Mount Rainier National Park

Coordinates: 46°52′08″N 121°39′33″W

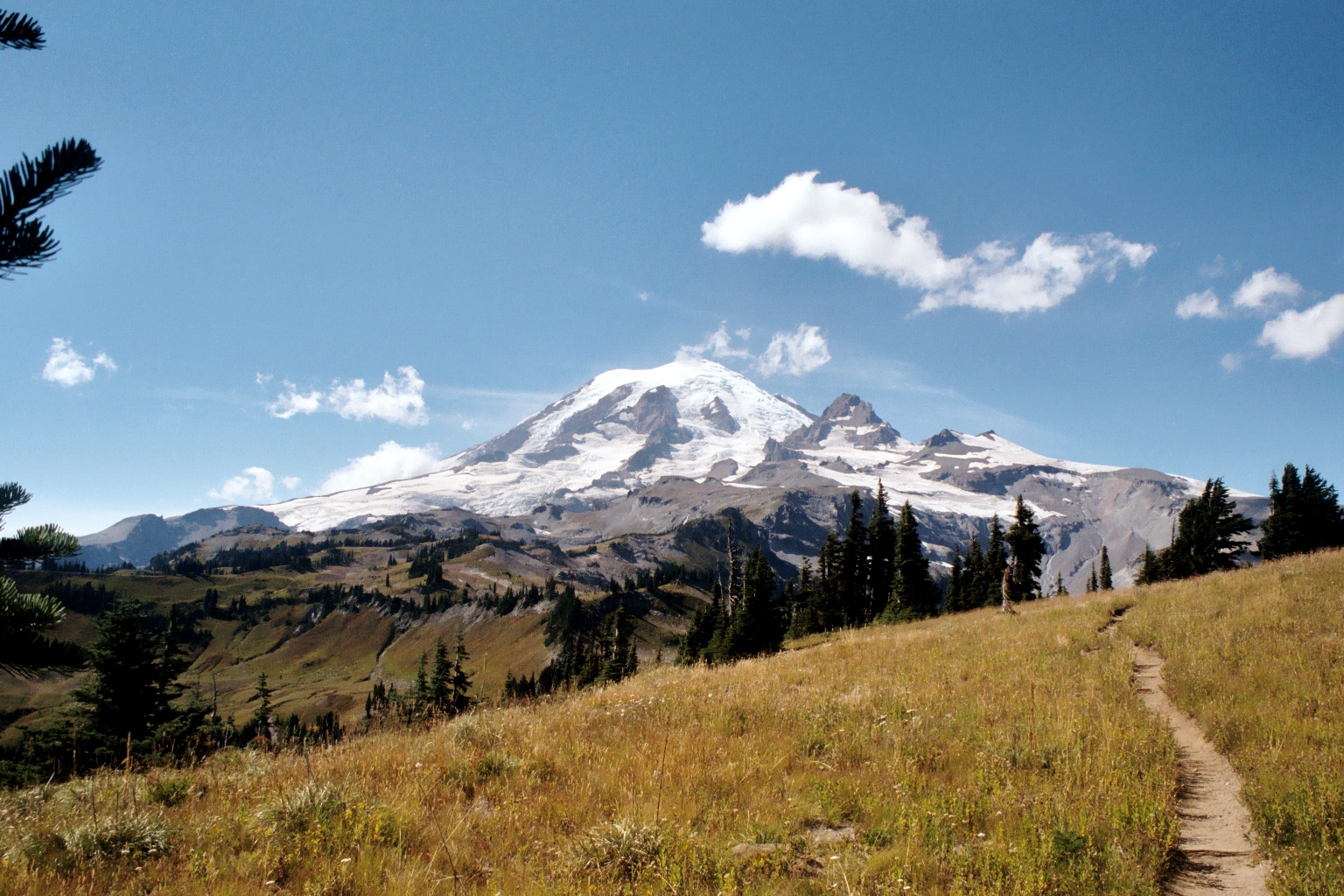
- The Cowlitz Divide portion of the trail, in the southeastern portion of the park, offers many views of Mt. Rainier and its numerous glaciers
- Length: 93 mi (150 km)
- Location: Mount Rainier National Park, Washington, United States
- Trailheads: Longmire; Mowich Lake; Ipsut Creek Camp Ground; Sunrise parking area White River Camp Ground; Fryingpan Creek Trailhead; Box Canyon; Reflection Lakes; Cougar Rock
- Use: Hiking
- Elevation gain/loss: 22,000 feet (6,700 m) gain approximately
- Highest point: Panhandle Gap; 6,750 feet (2,060 m)
- Lowest point: Ipsut Creek Campground; 2,320 feet (710 m)
- Season: Summer to early fall
- Website: nps.gov/mora/planyourvisit/the-wonderland-trail.htm

The Wonderland Trail is an approximately 93-mile (150 km) hiking trail that circumnavigates Mount Rainier in Mount Rainier National Park, Washington, United States. The trail goes over many ridges of Mount Rainier for a cumulative 22,000 feet (6,700 m) of elevation gain. The trail was built in 1915. In 1981, it was designated a National Recreation Trail. An estimated 200 to 250 people a year complete the entire trail with several thousand others doing shorter sections of it. The average time taken to complete the entire trip is 10 to 14 days.

== Route ==
The trail is entirely within the national park and passes through major life zones of the park, from lowland forests to subalpine meadows of wildflowers. As the trail circles the mountain, hikers see different faces of Mount Rainier, carved by 25 named glaciers.

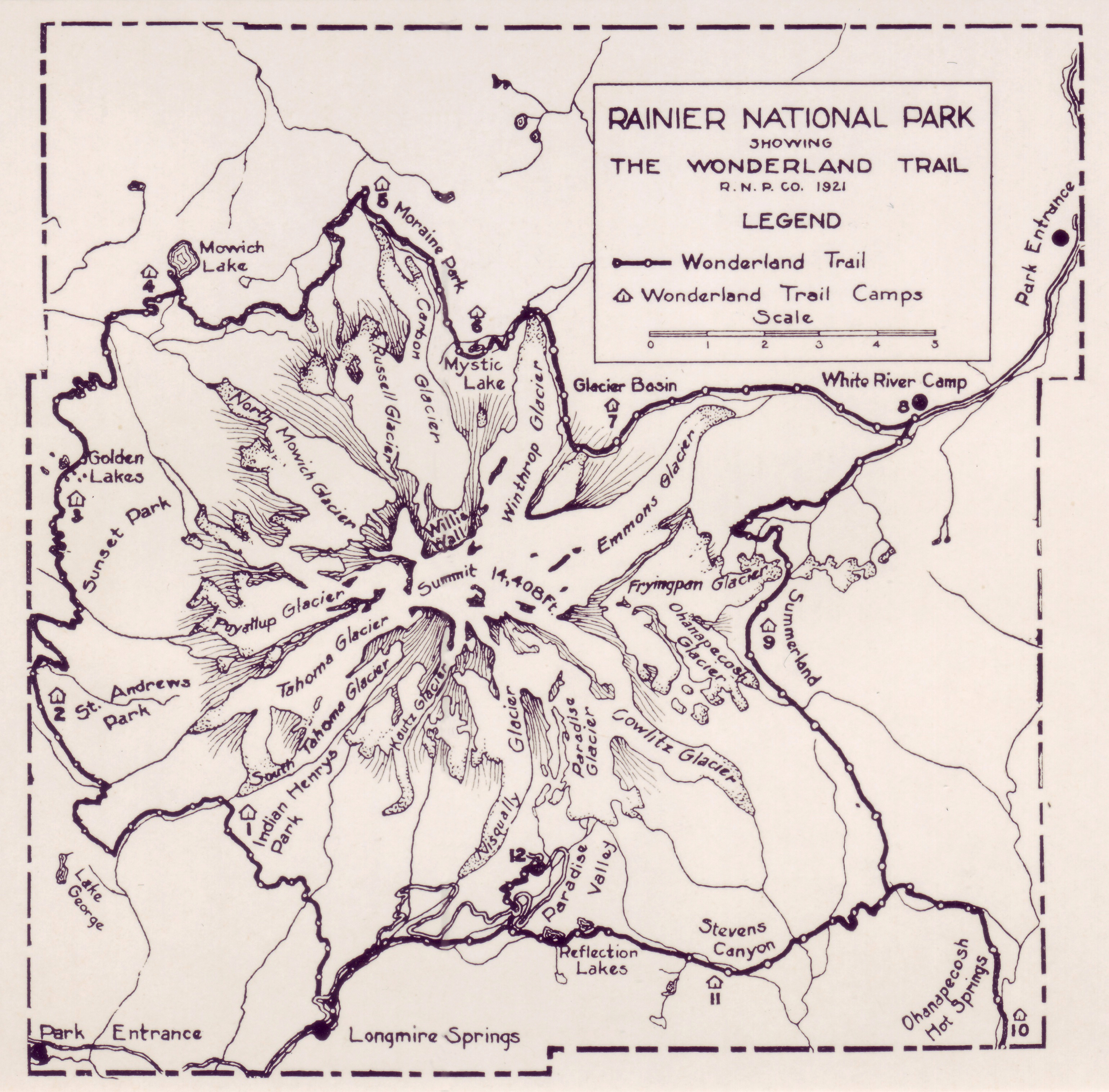
A map of the Wonderland Trail, from a 1921 Rainier National Park Company publicity brochure. The map shows the location of campsites for the company's saddle and pack horse outings around the mountain. Note that the indicated route crosses directly over the Winthrop Glacier.

The trail is considered strenuous as it is almost always climbing or descending the ridges around the mountain. The highest point is 6,750 feet (2,060 m) at Panhandle Gap.

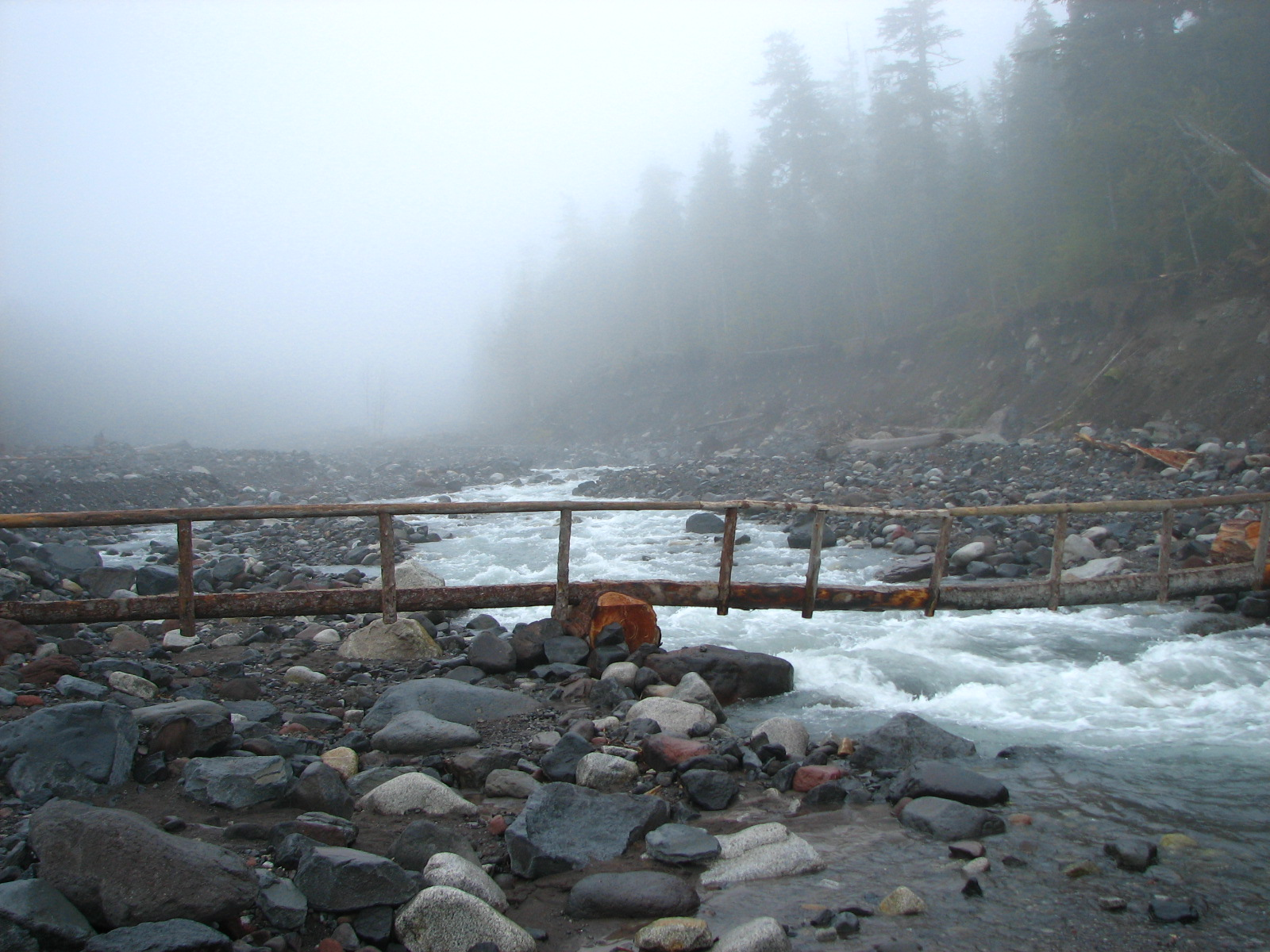
A footbridge, on the southern portion of the trail, spans the Nisqually River

There are many river crossings on the trail including two suspension bridges. Many of the rivers are crossed on primitive log bridges which can wash away during heavy rain or when there is a lot of snow melt in the rivers. Most of the bridges washed away during a major storm in November 2006, so the trail was impassable (and closed) to hikers through most of 2007.

The main hiking season is late summer, which is often dry and sunny. However, Mount Rainier's high elevation and proximity to the Pacific Ocean can also bring moisture as rain or snow to the trail. In many years, the Wonderland Trail is still mostly snow-covered during June and early July.

The traditional route between Mowich Lake and the Carbon River is via Ipsut Pass and Ipsut Creek. Many people take an alternative route across Spray Park and Seattle Park, a higher elevation route that often lies under snow until late August.

Complete trail descriptions may be found in a variety of trailbooks.

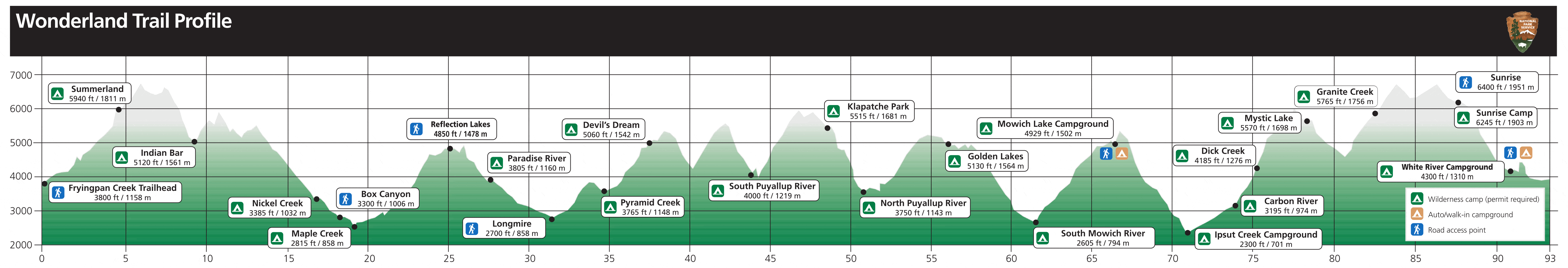
Mount Rainier National Park's Wonderland Trail Profile following the traditional Ipsut Creek route.

== Camping ==
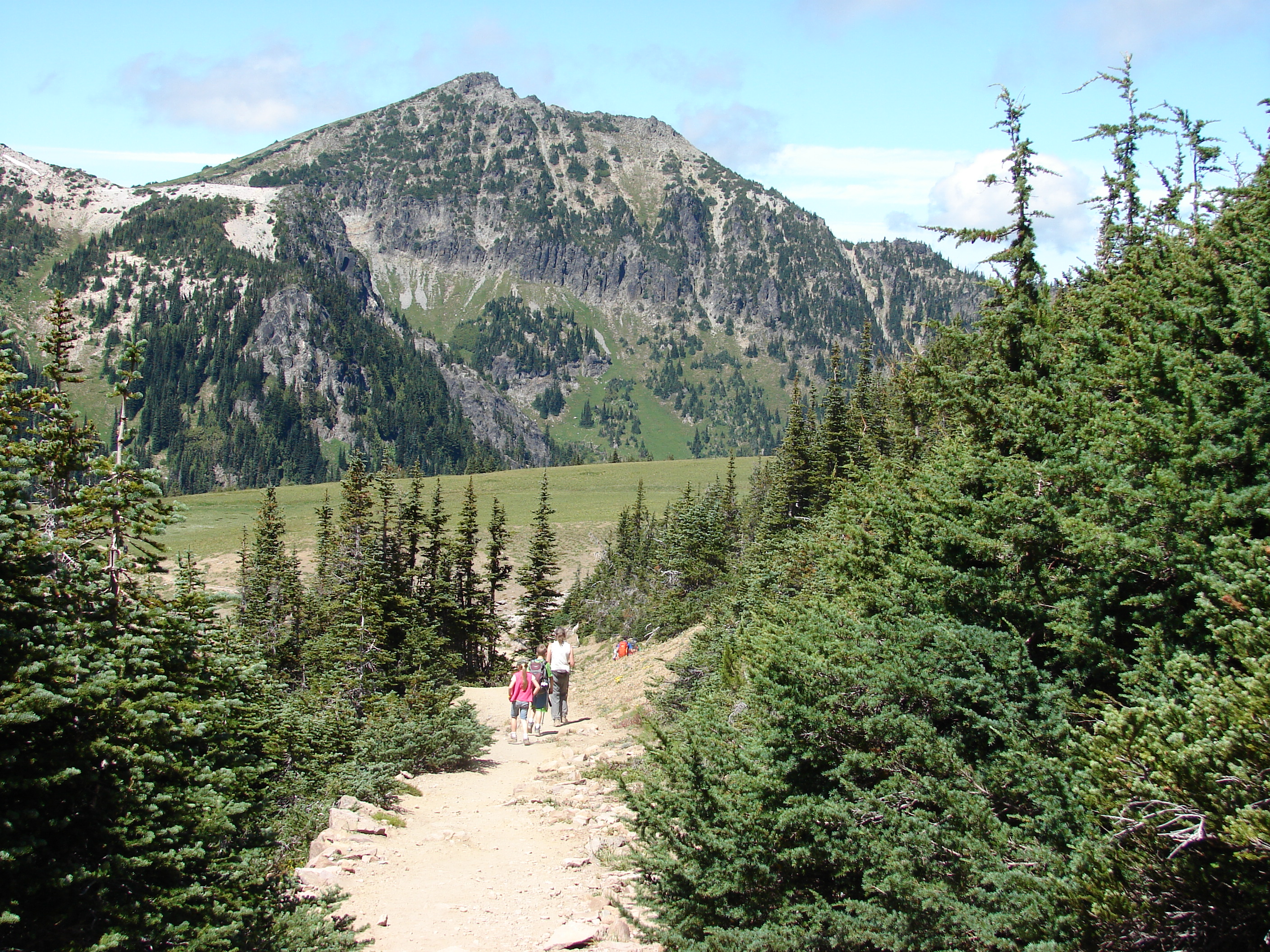
Family hiking on the trail

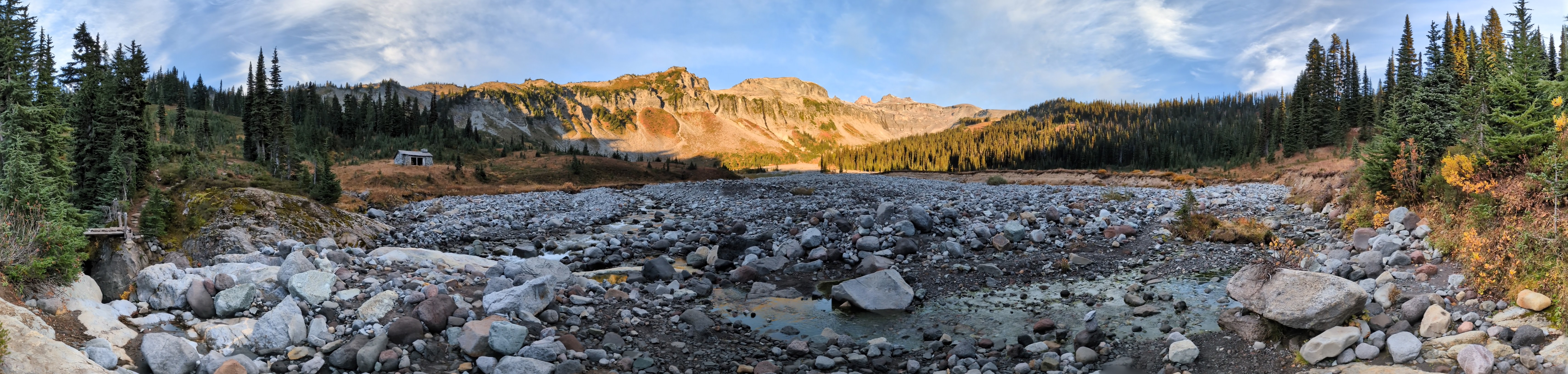
Panorama at dawn from near the campsites at Indian Bar, with the group shelter visible to the left and the Ohanapecosh River in the foreground

Camping along the Wonderland Trail is extremely popular throughout the summer and wilderness camping reservations are essential for many of the most popular campsites. Eighteen trailside camps, 3 to 7 miles (5 to 11 km) apart, are located along the Wonderland Trail. Each camp has 1 to 8 sites for 1 to 5 persons per site. These sites will hold at most 2 tents. Parties requiring space for 3 or more tents must camp in a group site. Group sites are available at certain camps for parties of 6 to 12 persons. These sites typically hold 3 to 5 tents. Each camp has cleared tent sites, a pit or composting toilet, a bear pole for hanging food, and a nearby water source.

== Trail shelters ==
There are three backcountry shelters along the Wonderland Trail in the National Park Service rustic. They are the Summerland Trail Shelter, the Indian Bar Trail Shelter, and North Mowich Trail Shelter. Staying at these shelters is considered backcountry camping and requires a permit. The shelters were built by the Civilian Conservation Corps between 1934 and 1940. See Wonderland Trail Shelters.

== Wilderness permits ==
A backcountry permit, including reservations for designated camping areas, is required to hike the Wonderland Trail. Prospective hikers can enter a lottery for permits early in the year. After the lottery, people may reserve designated camping areas using the federal government's Recreation.gov website. 30% of slots are held for 'walk-up' allocation at the park's wilderness centers.

Due to the damage suffered as the result of a flood in November 2006 the park service did not accept reservations for the 2007 summer season for attempts to hike the entire Wonderland Trail. The trail was reopened on August 3, 2007, after extensive work by the park service, the Washington Conservation Corps, Student Conservation Association and 1,700 volunteers.

== See also ==
- Wonderland Trail Shelters
- Tour du Mont Blanc, a trail circling Mont Blanc in France, Switzerland, and Italy
