= Sunrise Historic District =

Historic district in Washington, United States

- U.S. National Register of Historic Places
- U.S. Historic district
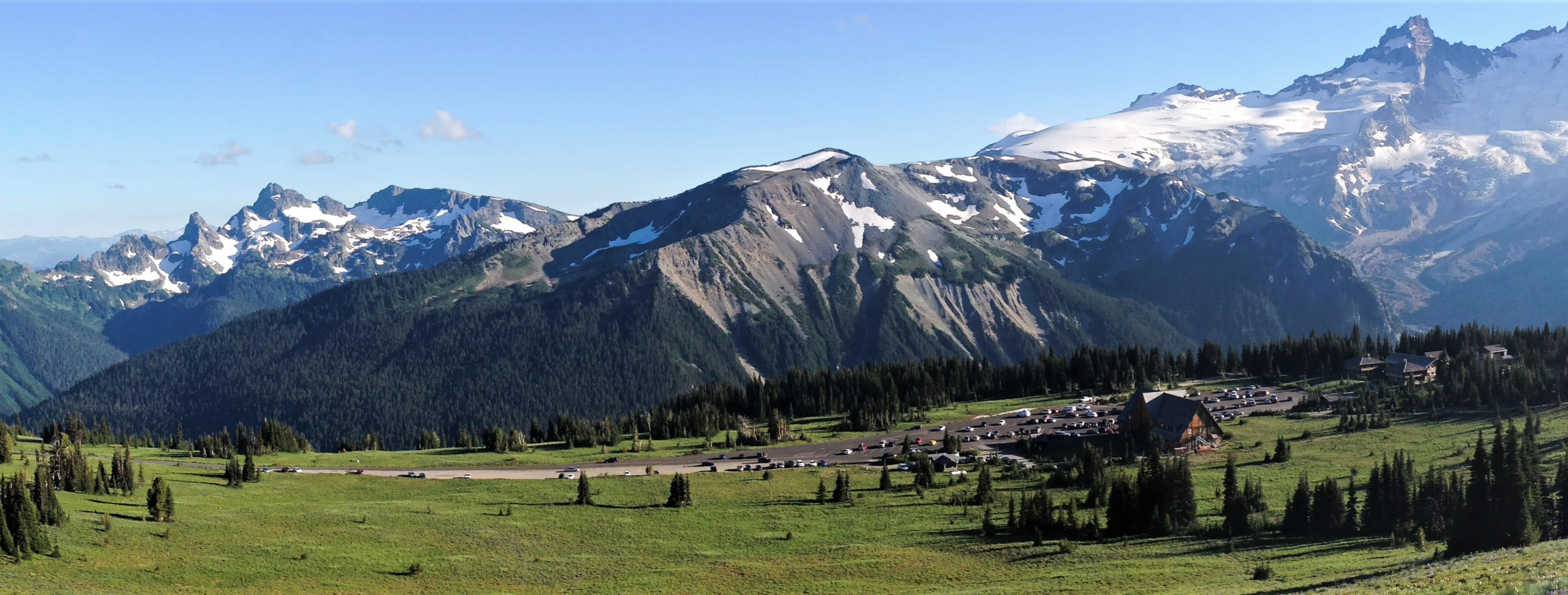
- Sunrise area from the ridge to the north

- Location within Washington (state) Location within the United States
- Location: Mt. Rainier National Park
- Coordinates: 46°54′53″N 121°38′27″W
- Area: 10 acres (4.0 ha)
- Architectural style: Rustic style
- MPS: Mt. Rainier National Park MPS
- NRHP reference No.: 91000175
- Added to NRHP: March 13, 1991

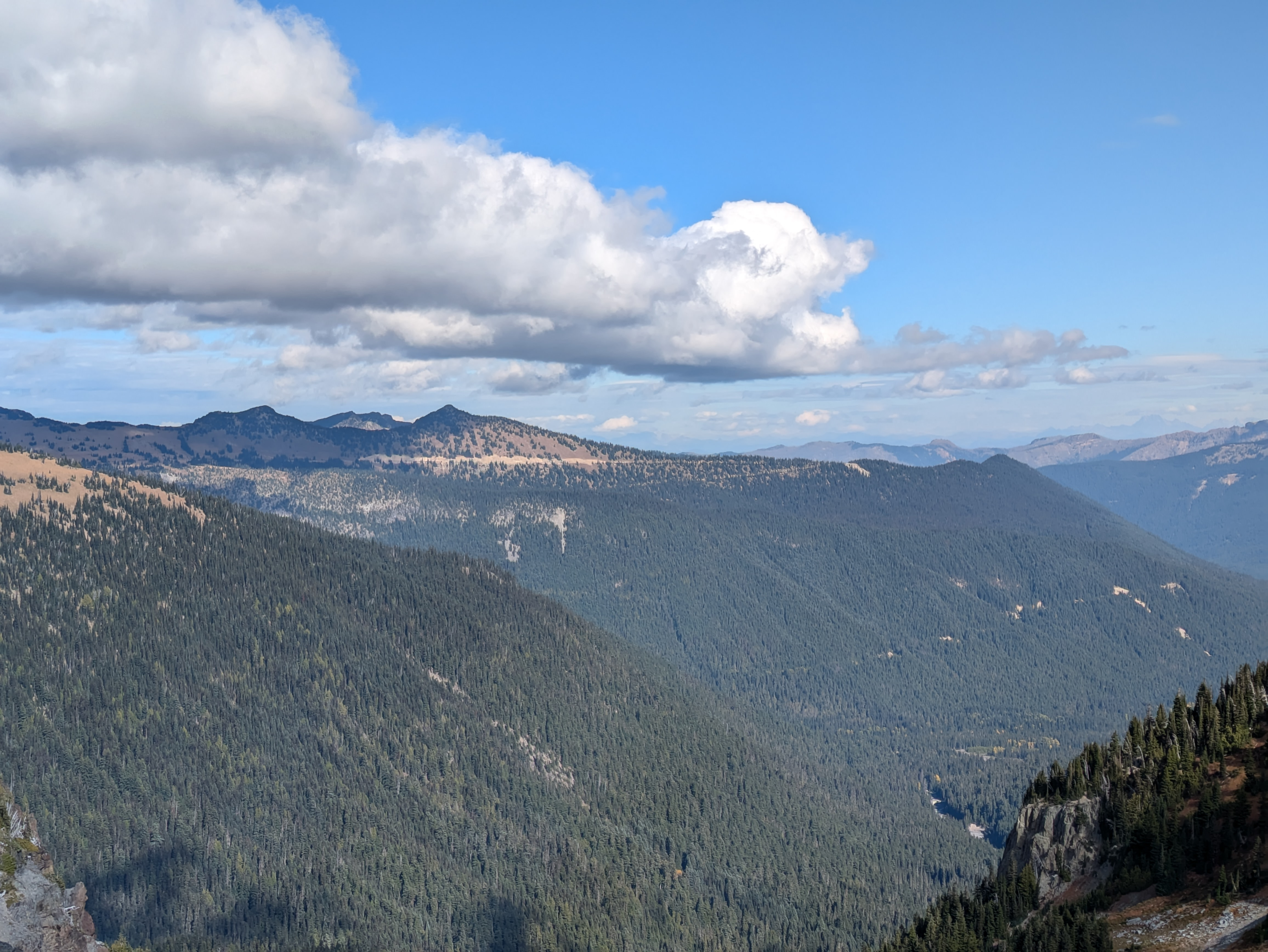
The road to Sunrise from Banshee Peak ridge (14 October 2024)

The Sunrise Historic District, also known as the community of Sunrise, Washington, is located at approximately 6,400 feet (2,000 m) on a ridge overlooking the northeast side of Mount Rainier in Mount Rainier National Park. The district comprises seven individual structures designed in accordance with the principles of the National Park Service Rustic style. The area is inhabited and open to the public only during a brief period in the summer season.

== Planning ==
The area was originally known as Yakima Park, and became accessible with the construction of a new road in the northeastern portion of the park, planned by Ernest A. Davidson of the National Park Service Landscape Division and the Bureau of Public Roads. Davidson prepared a master plan for Yakima Park, by way of contrast to development in the southern portion of the park at Paradise and Longmire, where haphazard development had become a significant management problem. Davidson's plan included a large hotel supporting a community of housekeeping cabins, an automobile service station, toilet facilities, and the unique blockhouses and stockade.

Initial construction was completed in 1932 with the first phase of the Sunrise Lodge, the Sunrise Comfort Station, the service station, the South Blockhouse and the Stockade. The North Blockhouse and Community Building were completed in 1944.

== Structures ==
=== Sunrise Lodge ===
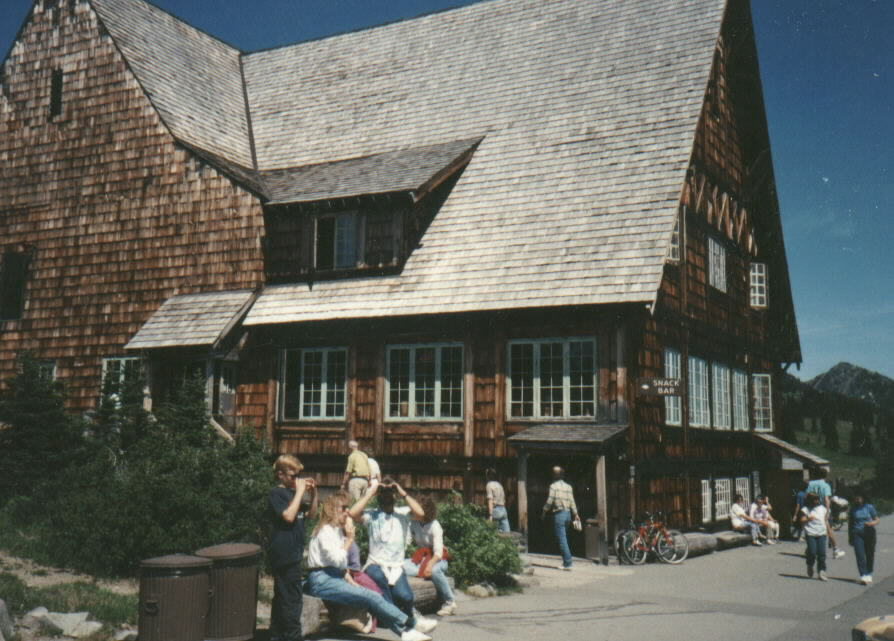
Sunrise Lodge in 1991

The Sunrise Lodge is a large shingled structure with a steeply pitched roof, built by the Rainier National Park Company in 1931. The 2-1/2 story building was intended to be the first wing of a resort hotel. It was built in about six weeks, serving as the centerpiece of a complex of 200 tourist cabins. The lodge accommodated dining facilities and staff dormitories. The cabins were removed through the late 1930s and 40s, sold to Eastern Washington farmers for migrant labor housing, or for housing around Puget Sound. Foundations for another wing of the planned U-shaped hotel were excavated, but never completed. The incomplete hotel continued in its original function, and is open on a seasonal basis in the present day.

== Designation ==
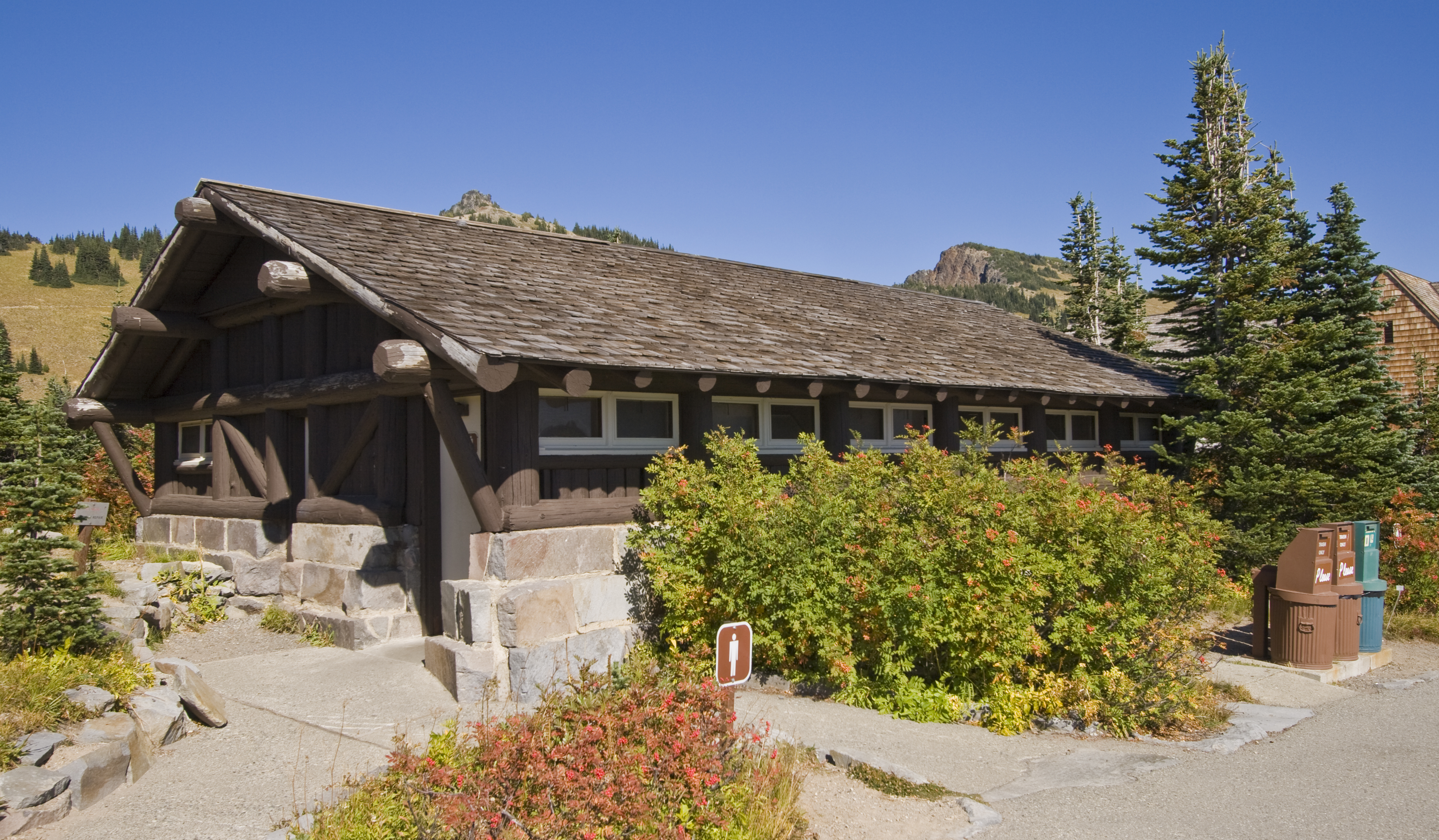
Sunrise Comfort Station

The area was placed on the National Register of Historic Places on March 31, 1991. The Yakima Park Stockade Group was declared a National Historic Landmark on May 29, 1987. The Sunrise Comfort Station was individually listed on the NRHP on March 13, 1991. The Sunrise Historic District is in turn part of the Mount Rainier National Historic Landmark District, which encompasses the entire park and which recognizes the park's inventory of Park Service-designed rustic architecture.

== Climate ==
Climate data for Sunrise Visitor Centre 46.9150 N, 121.6424 W, Elevation: 6,398 ft (1,950 m) (1991–2020 normals)
Month	Jan	Feb	Mar	Apr	May	Jun	Jul	Aug	Sep	Oct	Nov	Dec	Year
Mean daily maximum °F (°C)	30.2 (−1.0)	31.4 (−0.3)	34.2 (1.2)	39.0 (3.9)	46.7 (8.2)	52.1 (11.2)	61.8 (16.6)	62.9 (17.2)	56.5 (13.6)	44.4 (6.9)	34.0 (1.1)	28.8 (−1.8)	43.5 (6.4)
Daily mean °F (°C)	24.7 (−4.1)	24.7 (−4.1)	26.5 (−3.1)	30.5 (−0.8)	37.6 (3.1)	42.7 (5.9)	51.1 (10.6)	52.1 (11.2)	47.0 (8.3)	37.0 (2.8)	28.3 (−2.1)	23.5 (−4.7)	35.5 (1.9)
Mean daily minimum °F (°C)	19.1 (−7.2)	18.0 (−7.8)	18.9 (−7.3)	22.1 (−5.5)	28.5 (−1.9)	33.4 (0.8)	40.3 (4.6)	41.3 (5.2)	37.4 (3.0)	29.6 (−1.3)	22.6 (−5.2)	18.2 (−7.7)	27.5 (−2.5)
Average precipitation inches (mm)	11.62 (295)	9.15 (232)	9.43 (240)	6.07 (154)	3.74 (95)	2.69 (68)	0.93 (24)	1.14 (29)	2.27 (58)	6.08 (154)	11.47 (291)	12.87 (327)	77.46 (1,967)
Source: PRISM Climate Group
