= Yakima Park Stockade Group =

- U.S. National Register of Historic Places
- U.S. National Historic Landmark
- U.S. National Historic Landmark District – Contributing property
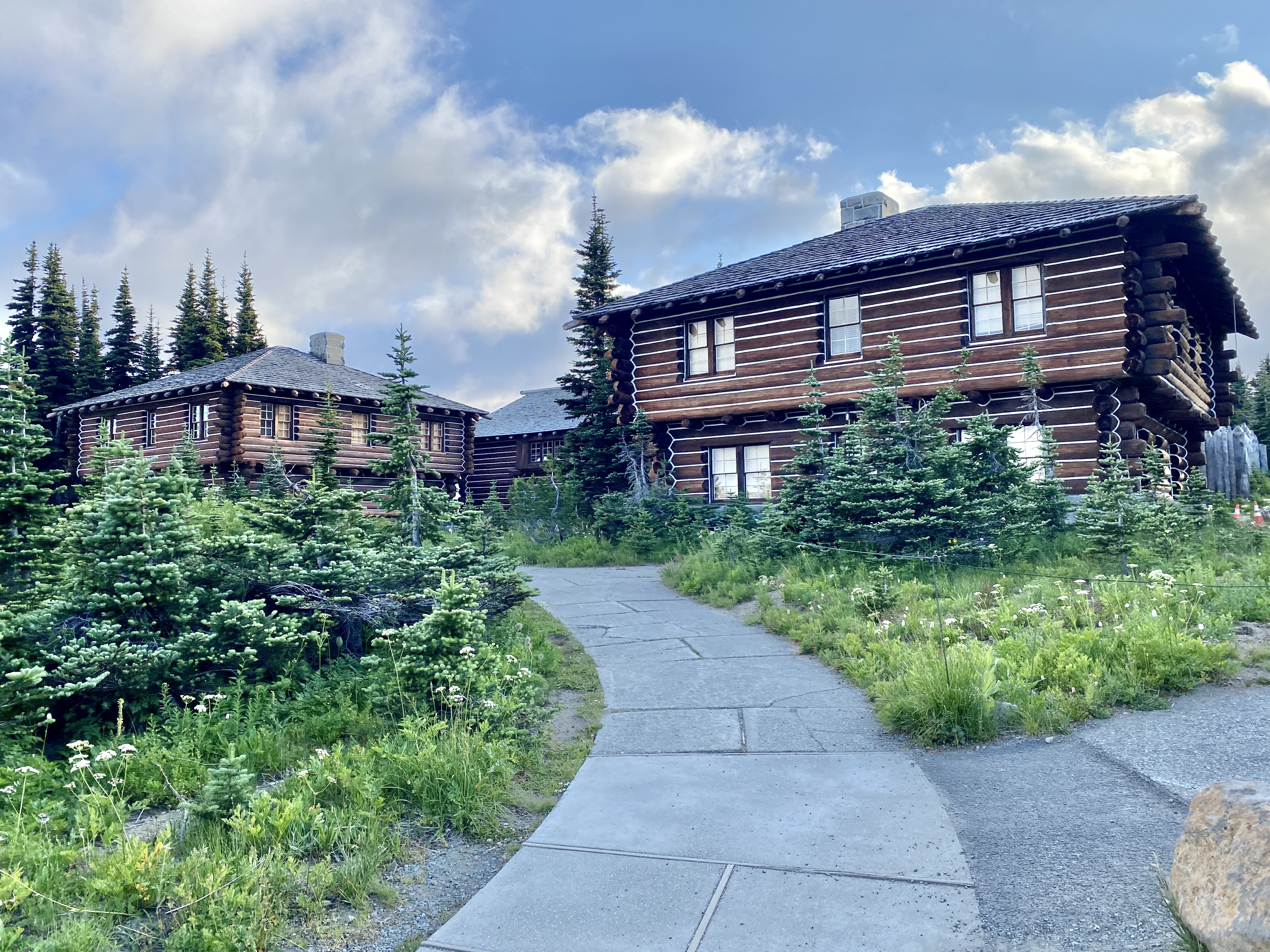

- Location within Washington (state) Location within the United States
- Location: Sunrise (Yakima Park), Mount Rainier National Park, Washington
- Coordinates: 46°54′49.31″N 121°38′32.45″W
- Built: 1930, 1943
- Architect: Ernest A. Davidson
- Part of: Mount Rainier National Park (ID97000344)
- NRHP reference No.: 87001337

Significant dates
- Added to NRHP: May 28, 1987
- Designated NHL: May 28, 1987
- Designated NHLDCP: February 18, 1997

The Yakima Park Stockade Group, also known as North and South Blockhouses and Stockade at Sunrise, is a building complex consisting of four log buildings at the Sunrise Visitors Center area in the northeast part of Mount Rainier National Park. The complex is architecturally significant as a particularly fine example of rustic frontier log architecture. The first of the blockhouses and the stockade were built in 1930, while the second blockhouse followed in 1943. It was declared a National Historic Landmark in 1987. It is in turn part of the Mount Rainier National Historic Landmark District, which encompasses the entire park and which recognizes the park's inventory of Park Service-designed rustic architecture.

== Design and construction ==
The stockade complex was designed by architect A. Paul Brown and landscape architect Ernest A. Davidson of the National Park Service. The design concept originated with Davidson, who was inspired by early structures erected by settlers against the possibility of Indian raids. Stone came from a rockslide about a mile away, and the white pine for framing and siding came from the area of the White River, about twelve miles from Yakima Park. Davidson had mixed feelings about the development, commenting that the location was less attractive than it had been before it was developed, but was still far superior to other developed areas of the park that had grown with no plan or regulation.

== Description ==
The south blockhouse was built first, in 1930. While it appears to be constructed of logs, it is a wood-frame structure with log siding. The square two-story building has a battered stone foundation wall extending to sill level, which is overhung by the second floor. The south blockhouse housed administrative and interpretation services for the Yakima Park area. The south blockhouse initially contained two administrative offices on the first floor, as well as a kitchen, dining room and living room for staff. The upper level included six bedrooms and two bathrooms. The Stockade is a vertical log fence built in the 1930s that hid a mess hall, since demolished, and which now conceals a split-face concrete block water treatment building built in 1985. Work on the visitor center and the north blockhouse began in 1939, and was completed in 1943, delayed by funding problems. The north blockhouse resembles the south blockhouse, with greater attention to stonework. The north blockhouse houses seasonal park employees. The visitor center is set between and behind the blockhouses, with a view of Mount Rainier through large south-facing windows. The building was previously known as the "campers' shelter" and the Museum. The visitor center is built of logs, with an overhanging second story, but with less of an overhang than the blockhouses. All of the structures have hipped roofs clad with cedar shingles.

== Sources ==
- Filley, Bette (1996). The Big Fact Book About Mount Rainier. Dunamis House. ISBN 1-880405-06-7.
