= Dewey Peak =

Mountain in Washington (state), United States

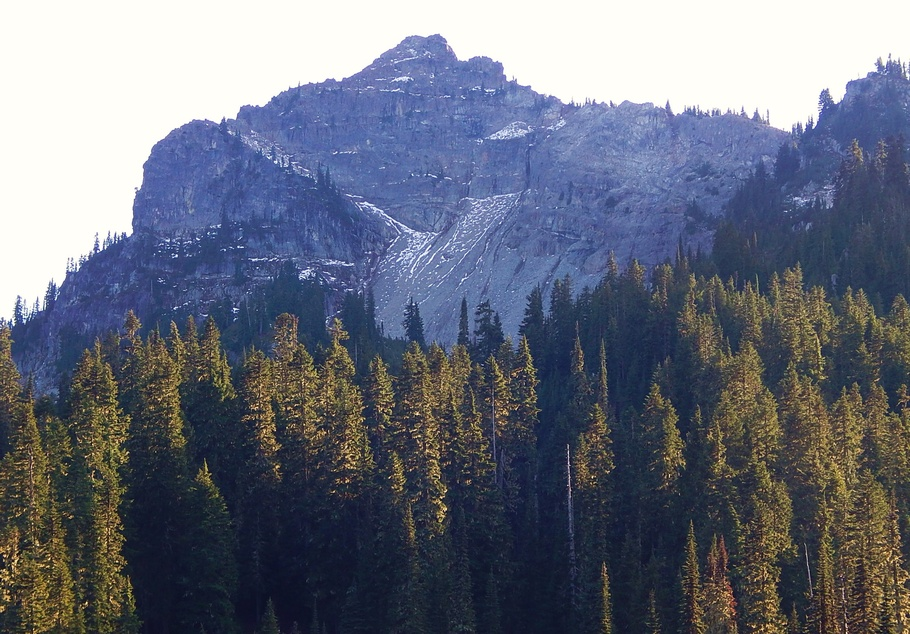
- Dewey Peak seen from Dewey Lake

Highest point
- Elevation: 6,710 ft (2,045 m)
- Prominence: 1,390 ft (424 m)
- Parent peak: Chinook Peak (6,904 ft)
- Isolation: 4.01 mi (6.45 km)
- Coordinates: 46°50′30″N 121°29′06″W

Geography
- Location within Washington (state) Location within the United States
- Country: United States
- State: Washington
- County: Pierce / Yakima
- Protected area: Mount Rainier National Park; William O. Douglas Wilderness
- Parent range: Cascades
- Topo map: USGS Cougar Lake

Climbing
- Easiest route: Scrambling class 4

Dewey Peak is a 6,710-foot (2,045 m) summit located on the shared border of Mount Rainier National Park and William O. Douglas Wilderness. It is also on the shared border of Pierce County and Yakima County in Washington state. Dewey Peak is situated on the crest of the Cascade Range southeast of Chinook Pass, east of Seymour Peak, and northeast of Shriner Peak. The nearest higher peak is Chinook Peak, 3.97 mi (6.39 km) to the north. Dewey Peak is named in association with Dewey Lake which is set below its north aspect. Precipitation runoff from Dewey Peak drains into tributaries of the Cowlitz River and Yakima River.

== Climate ==
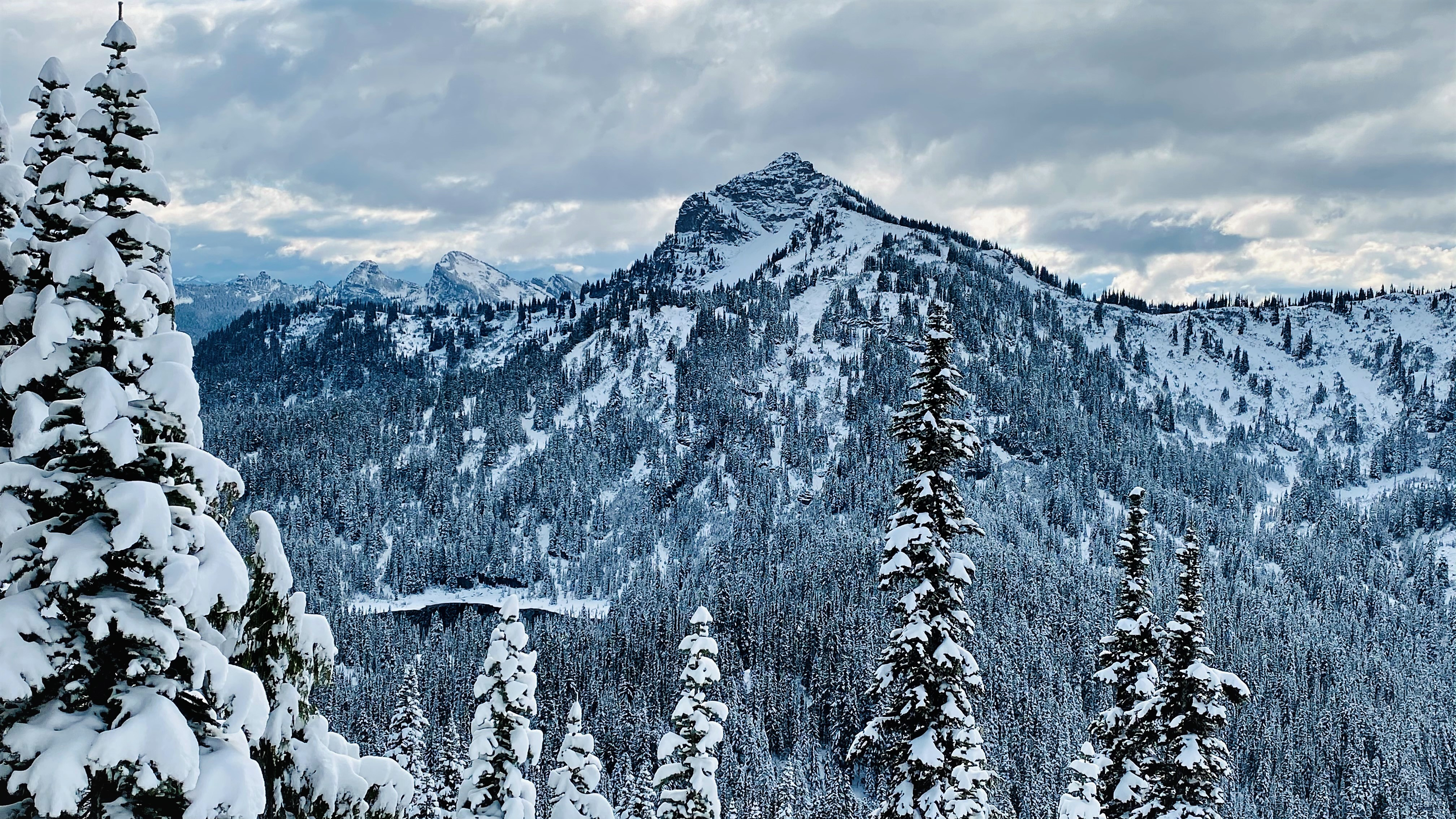
Dewey Peak in late autumn, from Naches Peak loop trail

Dewey Peak is located in the marine west coast climate zone of western North America. Most weather fronts originating in the Pacific Ocean travel northeast toward the Cascade Mountains. As fronts approach, they are forced upward by the peaks of the Cascade Range (orographic lift), causing them to drop their moisture in the form of rain or snow onto the Cascades. As a result, the west side of the Cascades experiences high precipitation, especially during the winter months in the form of snowfall. Because of maritime influence, snow tends to be wet and heavy, resulting in high avalanche danger. During winter months, weather is usually cloudy, but due to high pressure systems over the Pacific Ocean that intensify during summer months, there is often little or no cloud cover during the summer.

== Gallery ==
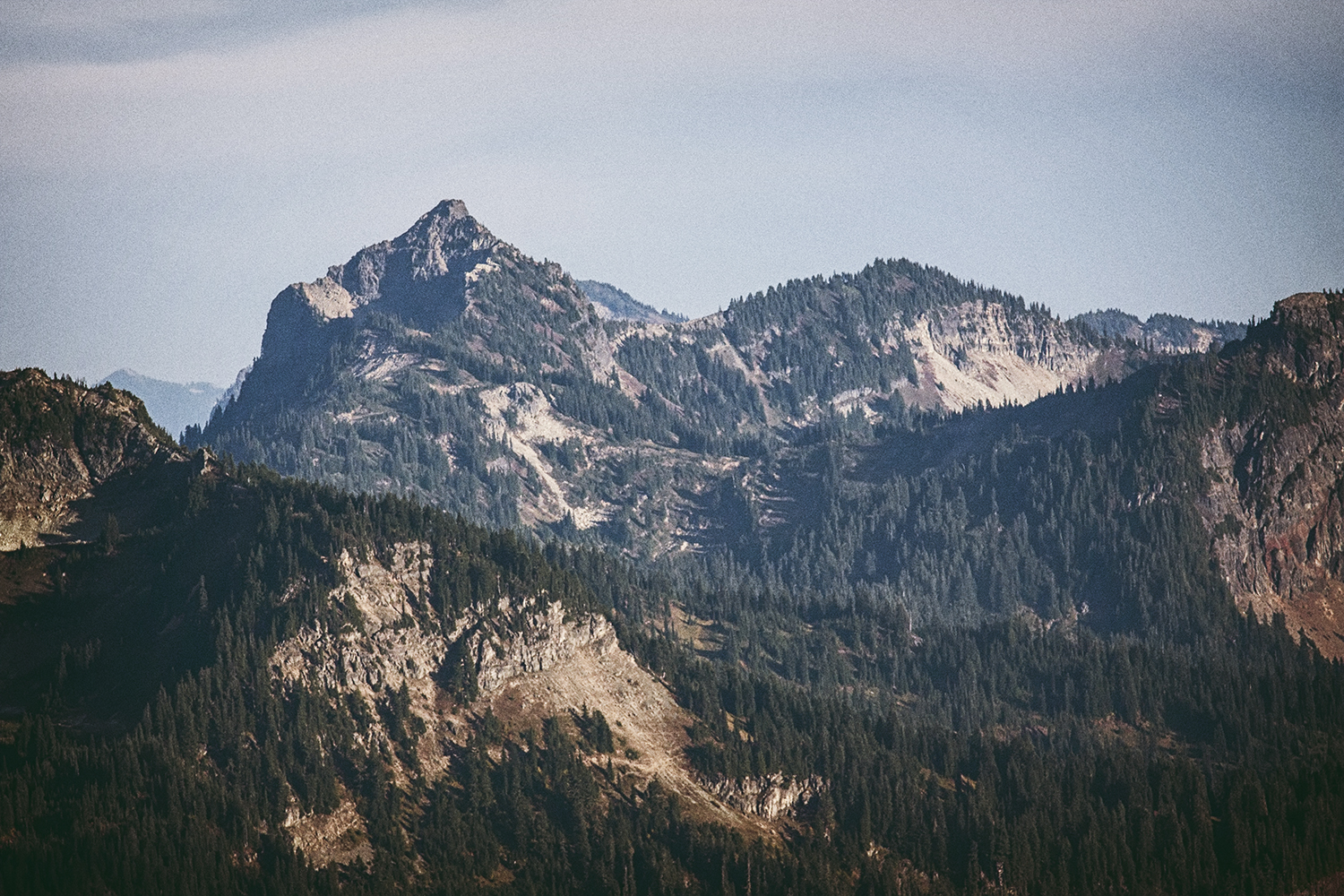
Dewey Peak seen from northwest

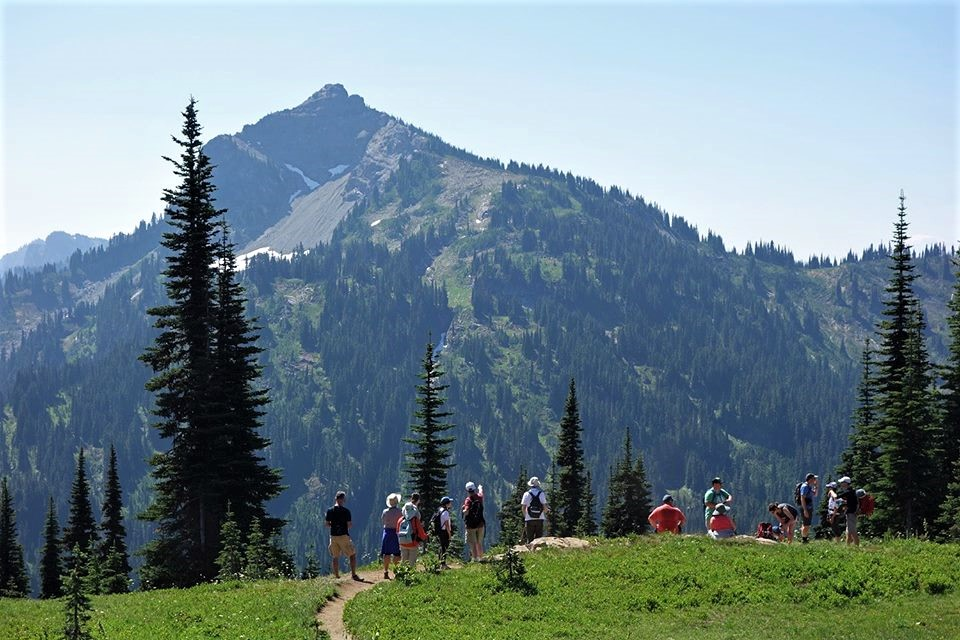
Dewey Peak seen from Naches Peak Loop Trail
