= Double Peak =

Double Peak may refer to:

- any mountain with two adjacent summits
- specific mountains with this feature, such as:
  - Double Peak (Alaska), a mountain in the Aleutian Range
  - Double Peak (Arizona)
  - Double Peak (Fresno County, California)
  - Double Peak (San Diego County, California)
  - Double Peak (Oregon)
  - Double Peak (Washington)

== See also ==
- Twin peak
