= Double Peak (Washington) =

Mountain in Washington (state), United States

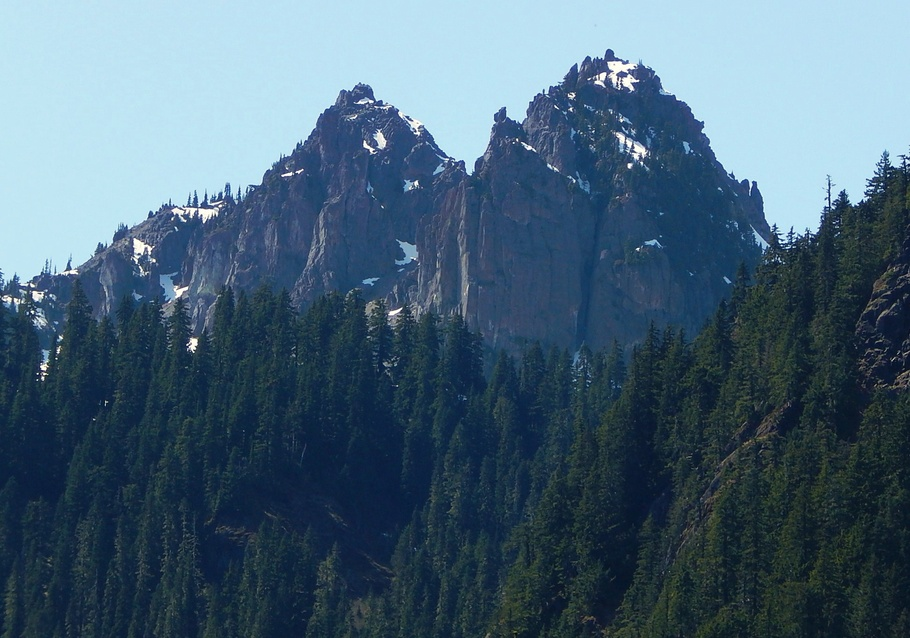
- Double Peak seen from Highway 123

Highest point
- Elevation: 6,199 ft (1,889 m)
- Prominence: 759 ft (231 m)
- Parent peak: Cowlitz Chimneys
- Isolation: 1.98 mi (3.19 km)
- Coordinates: 46°49′43″N 121°34′48″W

Geography
- Location within Washington (state) Location within the United States
- Country: United States
- State: Washington
- County: Pierce
- Protected area: Mount Rainier National Park
- Parent range: Cascades
- Topo map: USGS Chinook Pass

Climbing
- Easiest route: Scrambling

Double Peak is a 6,199-foot (1,889 m) double summit mountain located in Mount Rainier National Park in Pierce County of Washington state. Part of the Cascade Range, it is situated northwest of Shriner Peak, south of Governors Ridge, and southeast of the Cowlitz Chimneys. Precipitation runoff from Double Peak drains into the Ohanapecosh River which is a tributary of the Cowlitz River. Topographic relief is significant as the summit rises 3,400 feet (1,036 meters) above the Ohanapecosh in one mile (1.6 km). The mountain's descriptive toponym was officially adopted in 1932 by the United States Board on Geographic Names.

== Climate ==
Double Peak is located in the marine west coast climate zone of western North America. Most weather fronts originating in the Pacific Ocean travel northeast toward the Cascade Mountains. As fronts approach, they are forced upward by the peaks of the Cascade Range (orographic lift), causing them to drop their moisture in the form of rain or snow onto the Cascades. As a result, the west side of the Cascades experiences high precipitation, especially during the winter months in the form of snowfall. Because of maritime influence, snow tends to be wet and heavy, resulting in high avalanche danger. During winter months, weather is usually cloudy, but due to high pressure systems over the Pacific Ocean that intensify during summer months, there is often little or no cloud cover during the summer.

== See also ==
- Geology of the Pacific Northwest

== Gallery ==
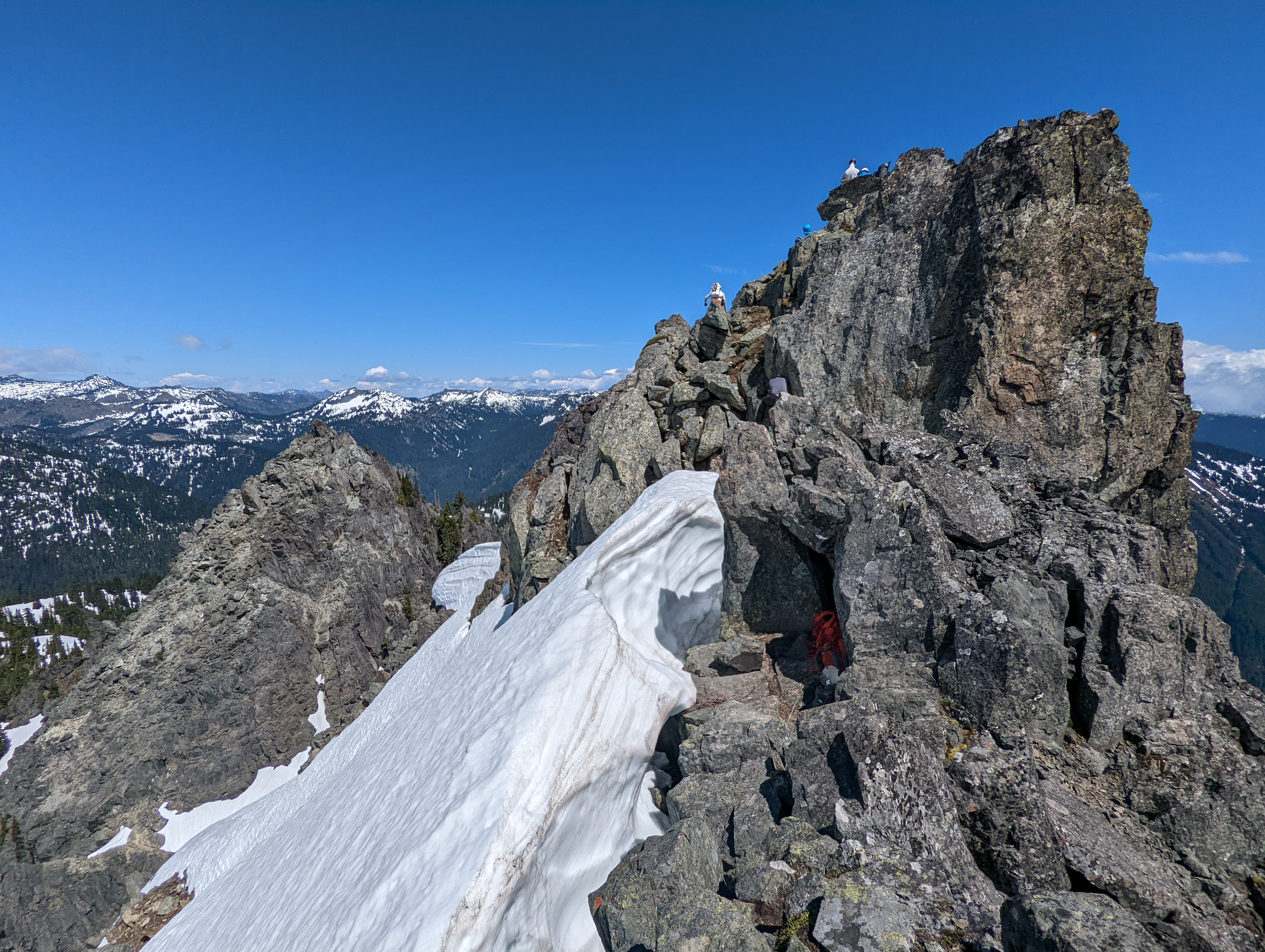
Peak of Double Peak

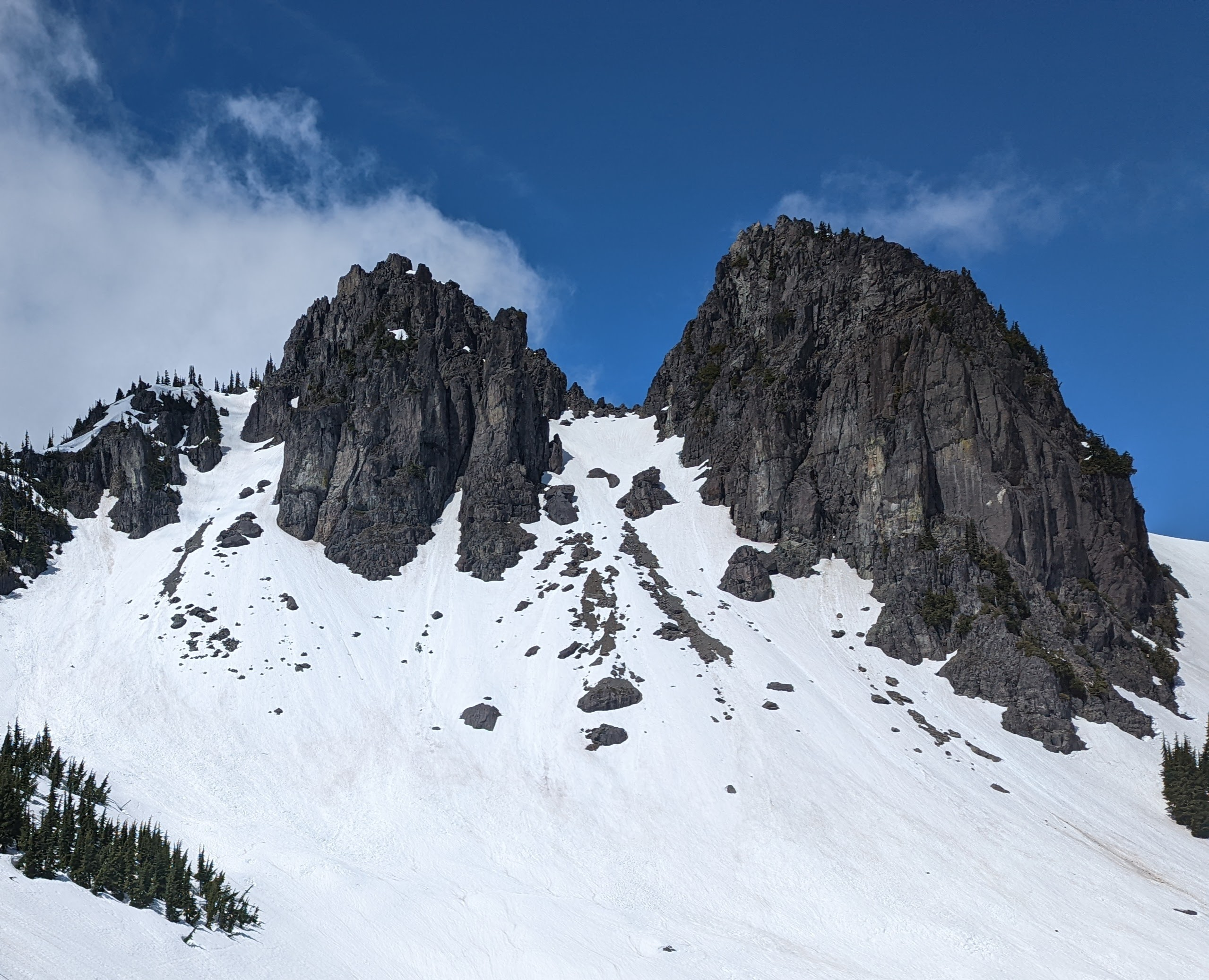
Double Peak (left) and Double Peak-Northeast Summit (right) as viewed from the southeast

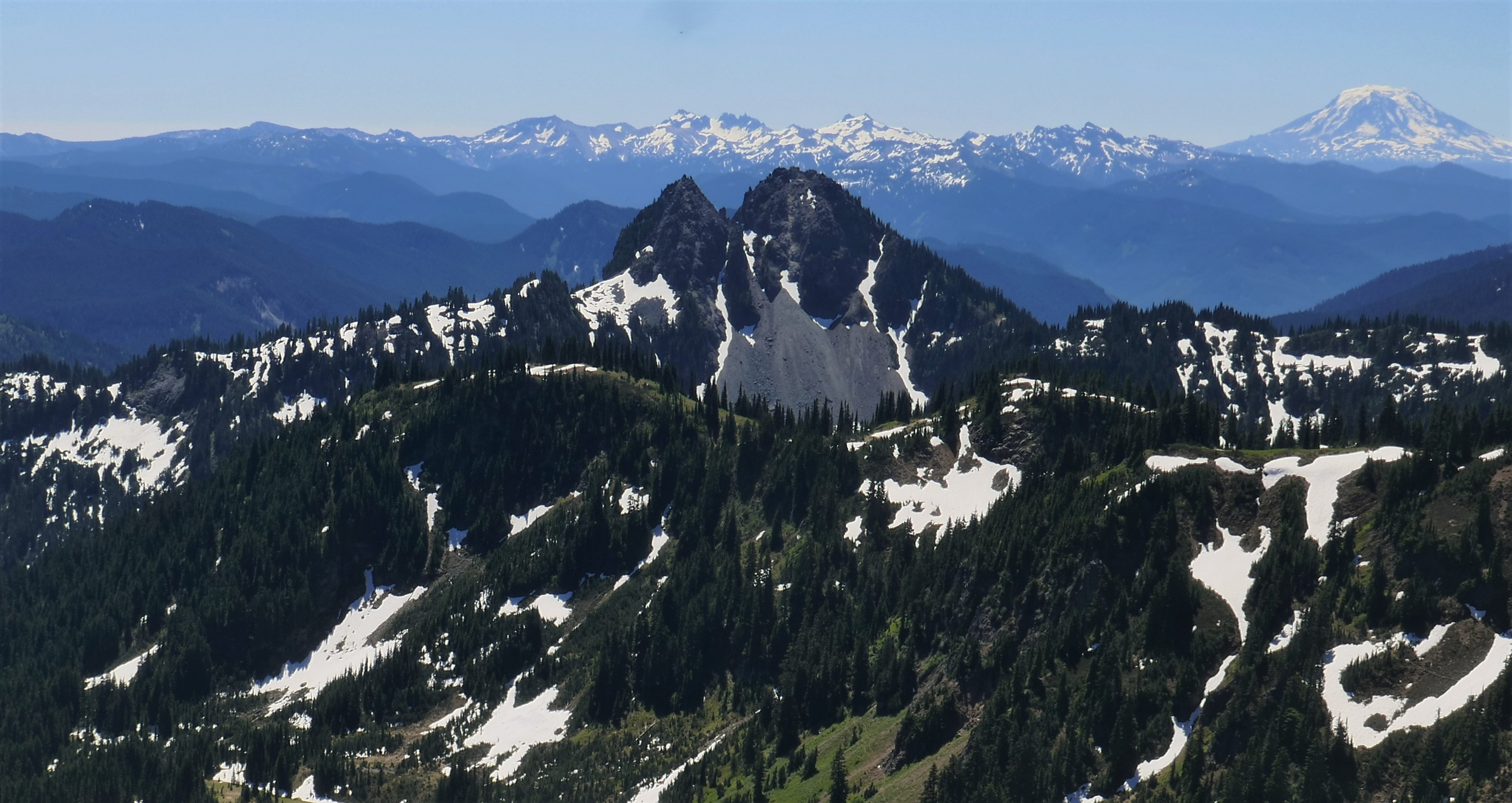
North aspect, from Tamanos Mountain

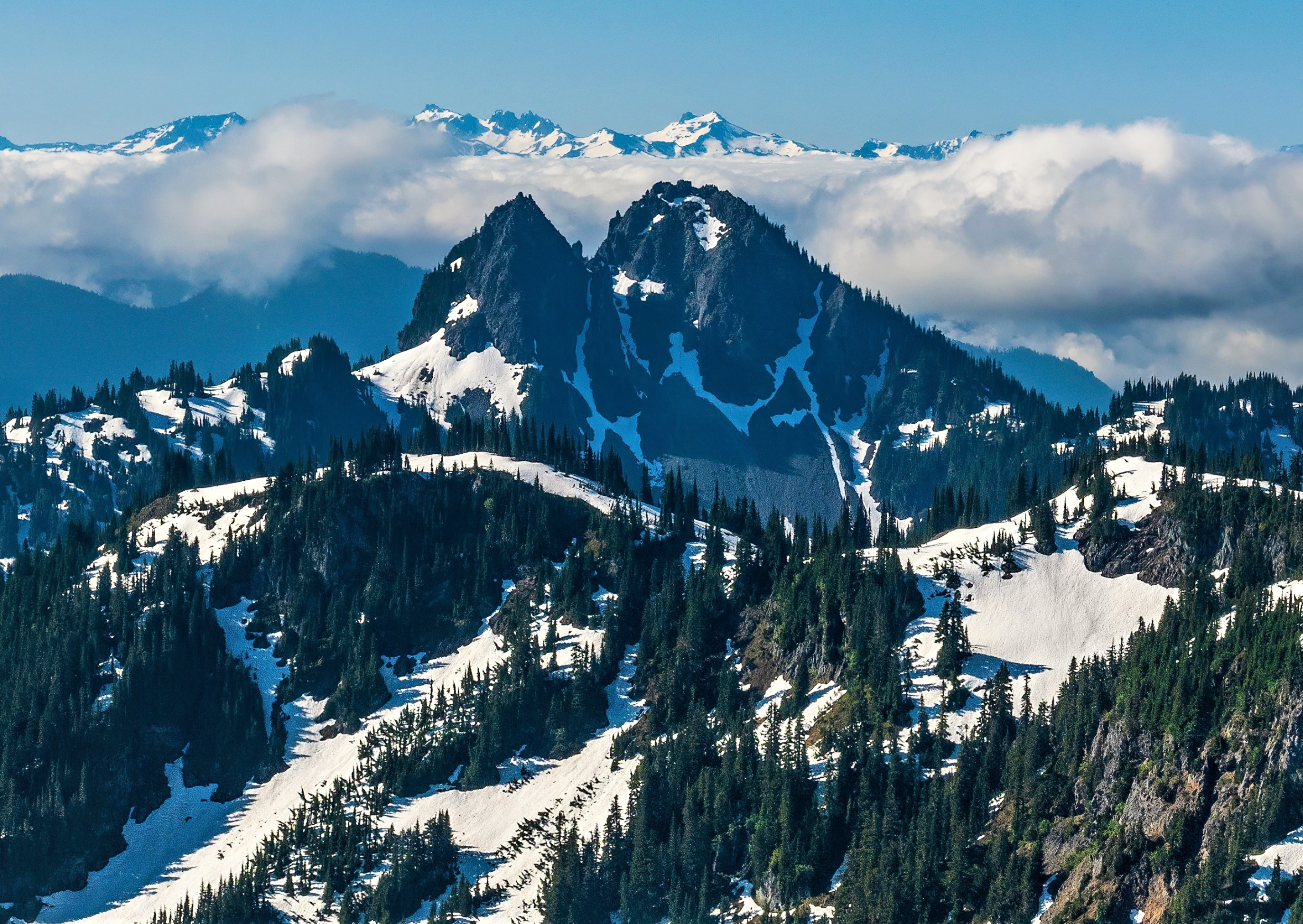

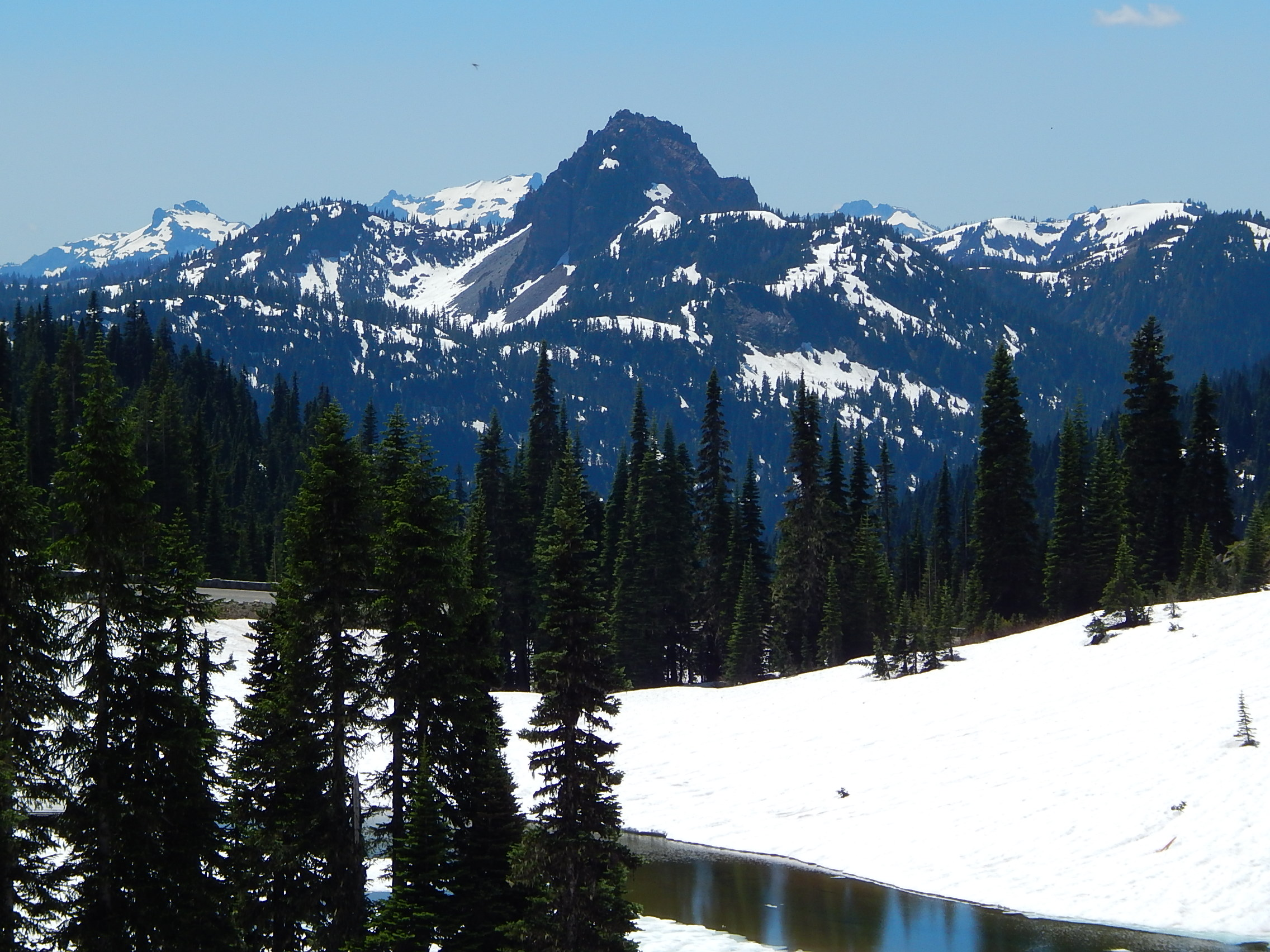
Double Peak seen from Tipsoo Lake

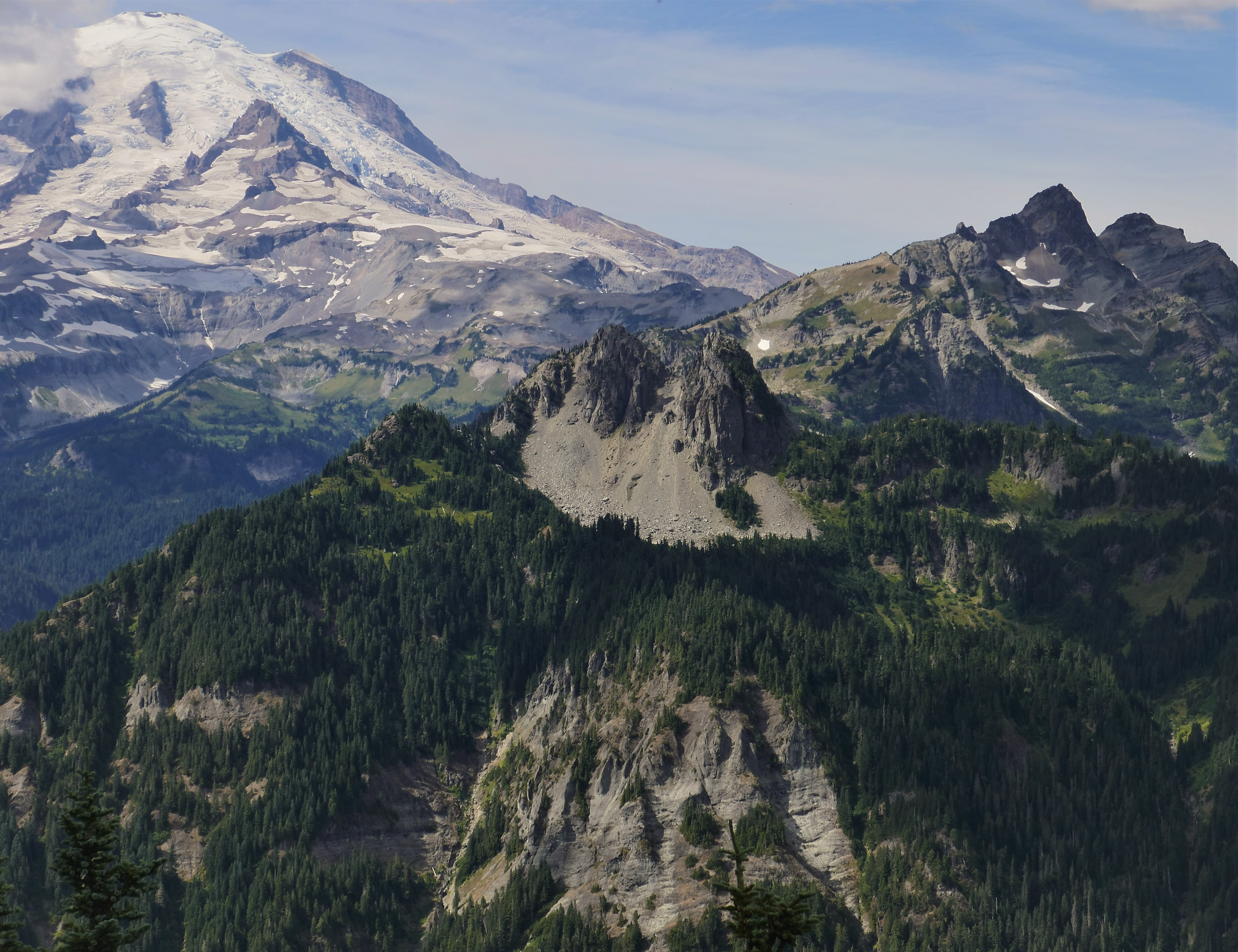
Mt. Rainier, Double Peak (centered), and the Cowlitz Chimneys (right) seen from Shriner Peak.
