= Buell Peak =

Mountain in Washington (state), United States

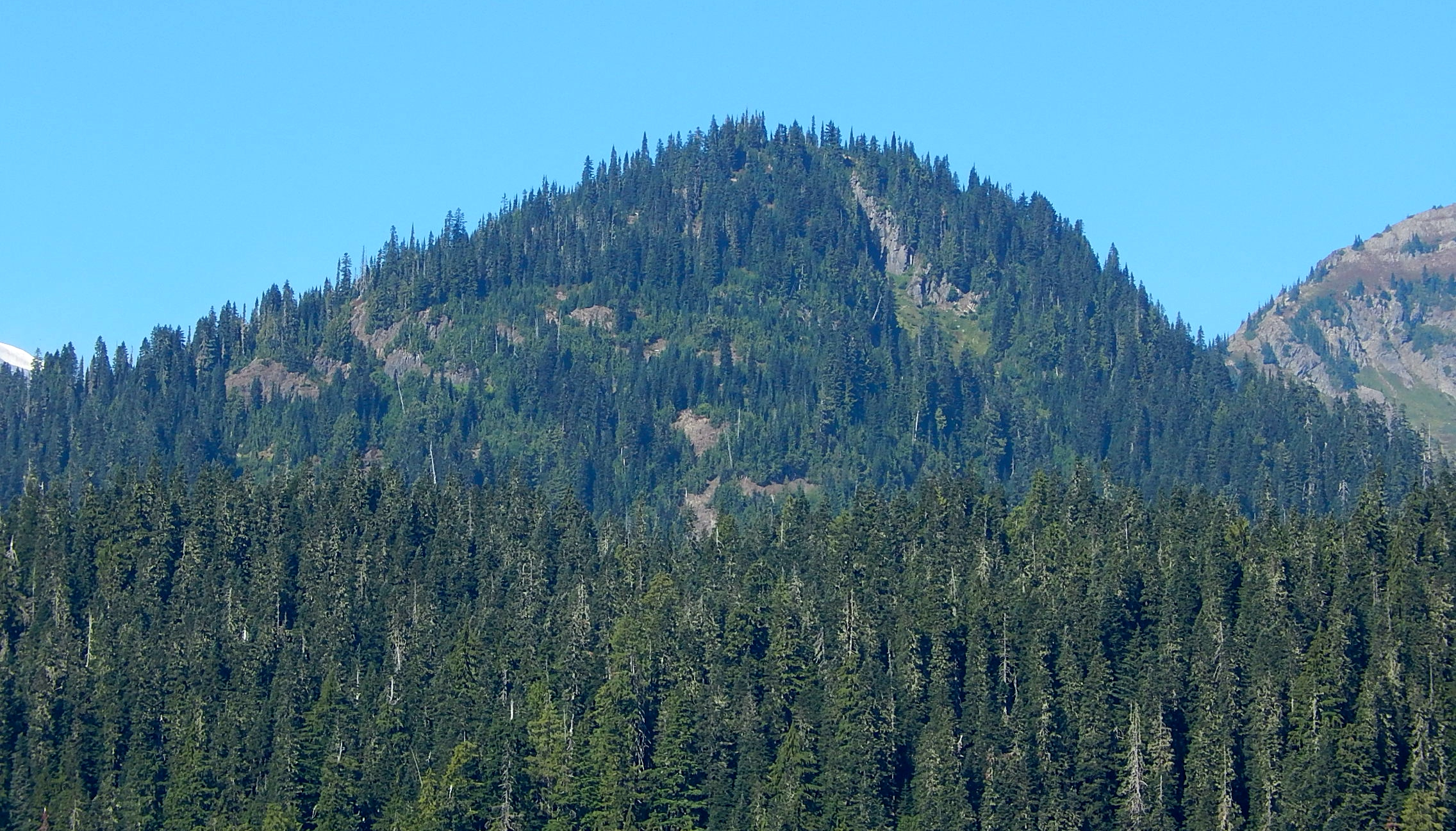
- Buell Peak seen from Highway 123

Highest point
- Elevation: 5,756 ft (1,754 m)
- Prominence: 236 ft (72 m)
- Parent peak: Barrier Peak
- Isolation: 0.89 mi (1.43 km)
- Coordinates: 46°51′09″N 121°33′41″W

Naming
- Etymology: John Latimore Buell

Geography
- Location within Washington (state) Location within the United States
- Country: United States
- State: Washington
- County: Pierce
- Protected area: Mount Rainier National Park
- Parent range: Cascades
- Topo map: USGS Chinook Pass

Climbing
- Easiest route: Scrambling class 3

Buell Peak is a small 5,756 ft (1,754 m) summit located in Mount Rainier National Park in Pierce County of Washington state. It is part of the Cascade Range and is situated 1.5 miles southwest of Cayuse Pass and 0.53 mile east-southeast of Barrier Peak, which is the nearest higher peak. Precipitation runoff from Buell Peak drains into tributaries of the Cowlitz River. The normal climbing access is from the Owyhigh Lakes Trail. The peak's toponym honors John Latimore Buell who arrived in Orting, Washington, in 1890 and went into the hardware business.

== Climate ==
Buell Peak is located in the marine west coast climate zone of western North America. Most weather fronts originating in the Pacific Ocean travel northeast toward the Cascade Mountains. As fronts approach, they are forced upward by the peaks of the Cascade Range (Orographic lift), causing them to drop their moisture in the form of rain or snow onto the Cascades. As a result, the west side of the Cascades experiences high precipitation, especially during the winter months in the form of snowfall. Because of maritime influence, snow tends to be wet and heavy, resulting in high avalanche danger. During winter months, weather is usually cloudy, but due to high pressure systems over the Pacific Ocean that intensify during summer months, there is often little or no cloud cover during the summer.

== See also ==
- Geography of Washington (state)

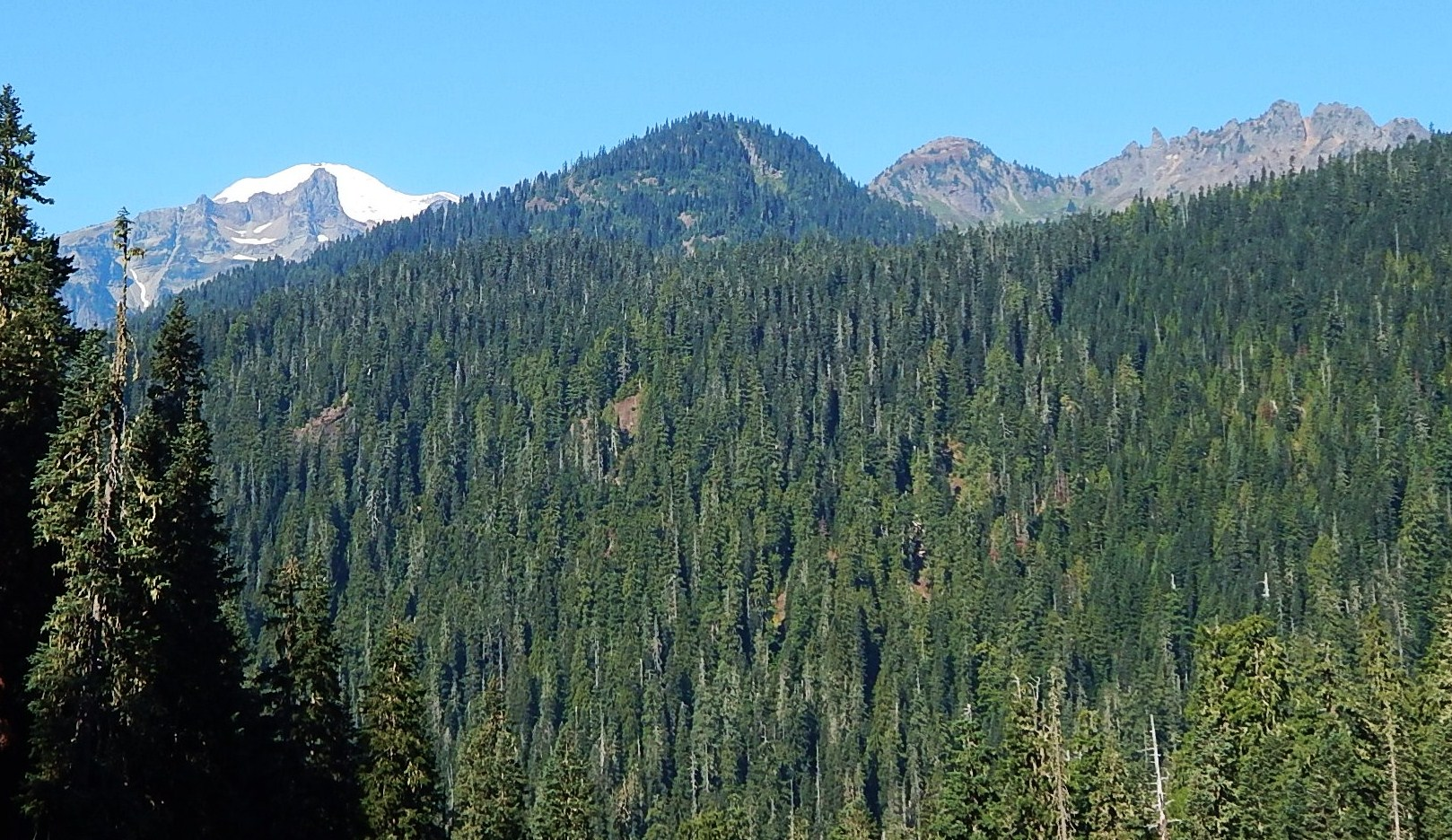
Buell Peak seen with Barrier Peak and Governors Ridge (right), and Main Cowlitz Chimney (left)
