= Twin Peak =

Twin Peak may refer to:

- Twin Peaks, television series
- The Twins, two mountains in Canada known as:
  - North Twin Peak
  - South Twin Peak
- An American garage rock band : Twin Peaks

== See also ==
- Twin peak
- Double summit
- Double Peak (disambiguation)
- Twin peak sign in obstetric ultrasonography
