= Barrier Peak =

Mountain in Washington (state), United States

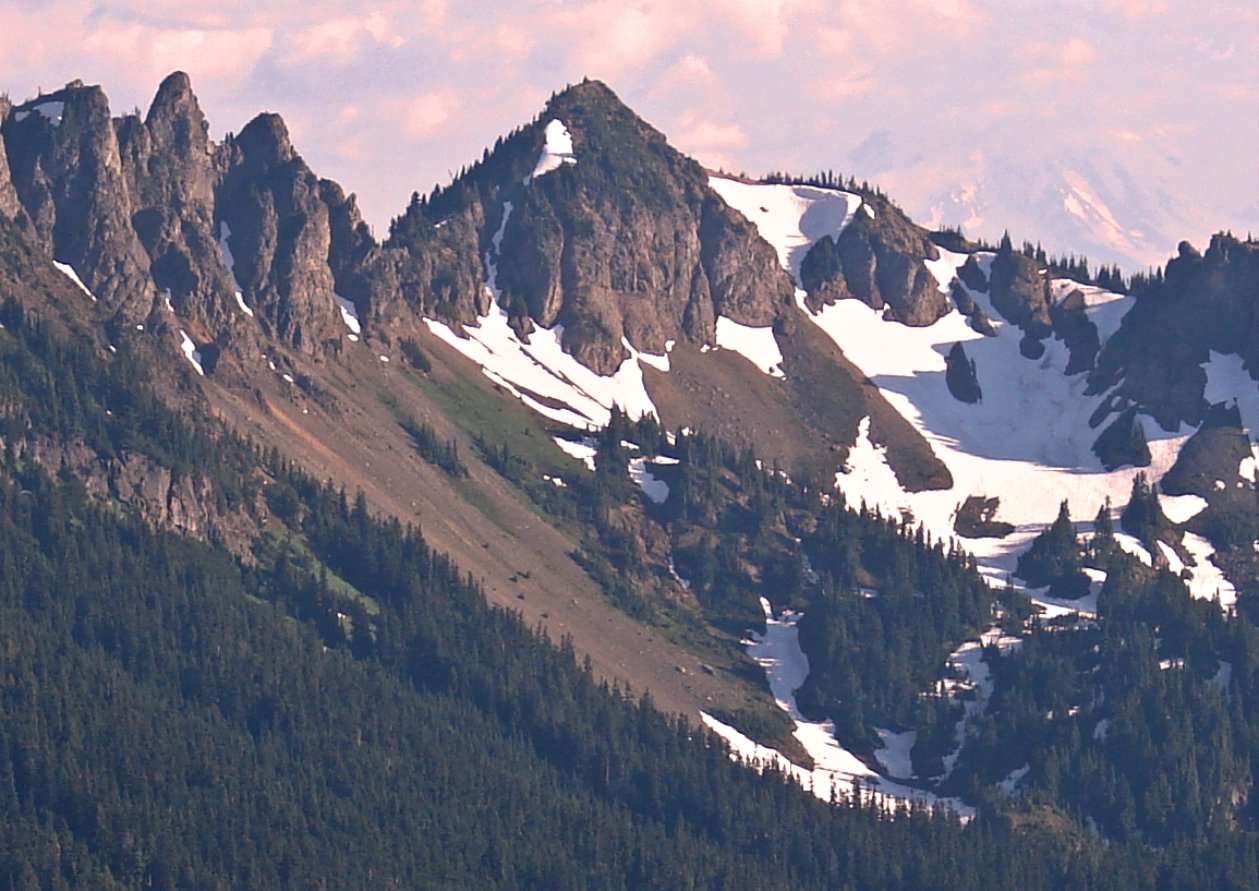
- Barrier Peak seen from Sourdough Ridge

Highest point
- Elevation: 6,521 ft (1,988 m)
- Prominence: 301 ft (92 m)
- Parent peak: Governors Ridge
- Isolation: 0.40 mi (0.64 km)
- Coordinates: 46°51′34″N 121°34′38″W

Geography
- Location within Washington (state) Location within the United States
- Country: United States
- State: Washington
- County: Pierce
- Protected area: Mount Rainier National Park
- Parent range: Cascades
- Topo map: USGS Chinook Pass

Climbing
- Easiest route: Scrambling class 3

Barrier Peak is a small 6,521-foot (1,988-metre) summit located in Mount Rainier National Park in Pierce County of Washington state. It is part of the Cascade Range and is situated west of Cayuse Pass, 0.53 mile west-northwest of Buell Peak, and 0.4 mile south-southwest of Governors Ridge, which is its nearest higher peak. Precipitation runoff from Barrier Peak drains into tributaries of the White River and Cowlitz River. The normal climbing access is from the Owyhigh Lakes Trail. The peak was so named because it served as a barrier between the Cayuse Pass region and the rest of Mount Rainier National Park.

== Climate ==
Barrier Peak is located in the marine west coast climate zone of western North America. Most weather fronts originating in the Pacific Ocean travel northeast toward the Cascade Mountains. As fronts approach, they are forced upward by the peaks of the Cascade Range (Orographic lift), causing them to drop their moisture in the form of rain or snow onto the Cascades. As a result, the west side of the Cascades experiences high precipitation, especially during the winter months in the form of snowfall. Because of maritime influence, snow tends to be wet and heavy, resulting in high avalanche danger. During winter months, weather is usually cloudy, but due to high pressure systems over the Pacific Ocean that intensify during summer months, there is often little or no cloud cover during the summer.

== See also ==
- Geology of the Pacific Northwest

== Gallery ==
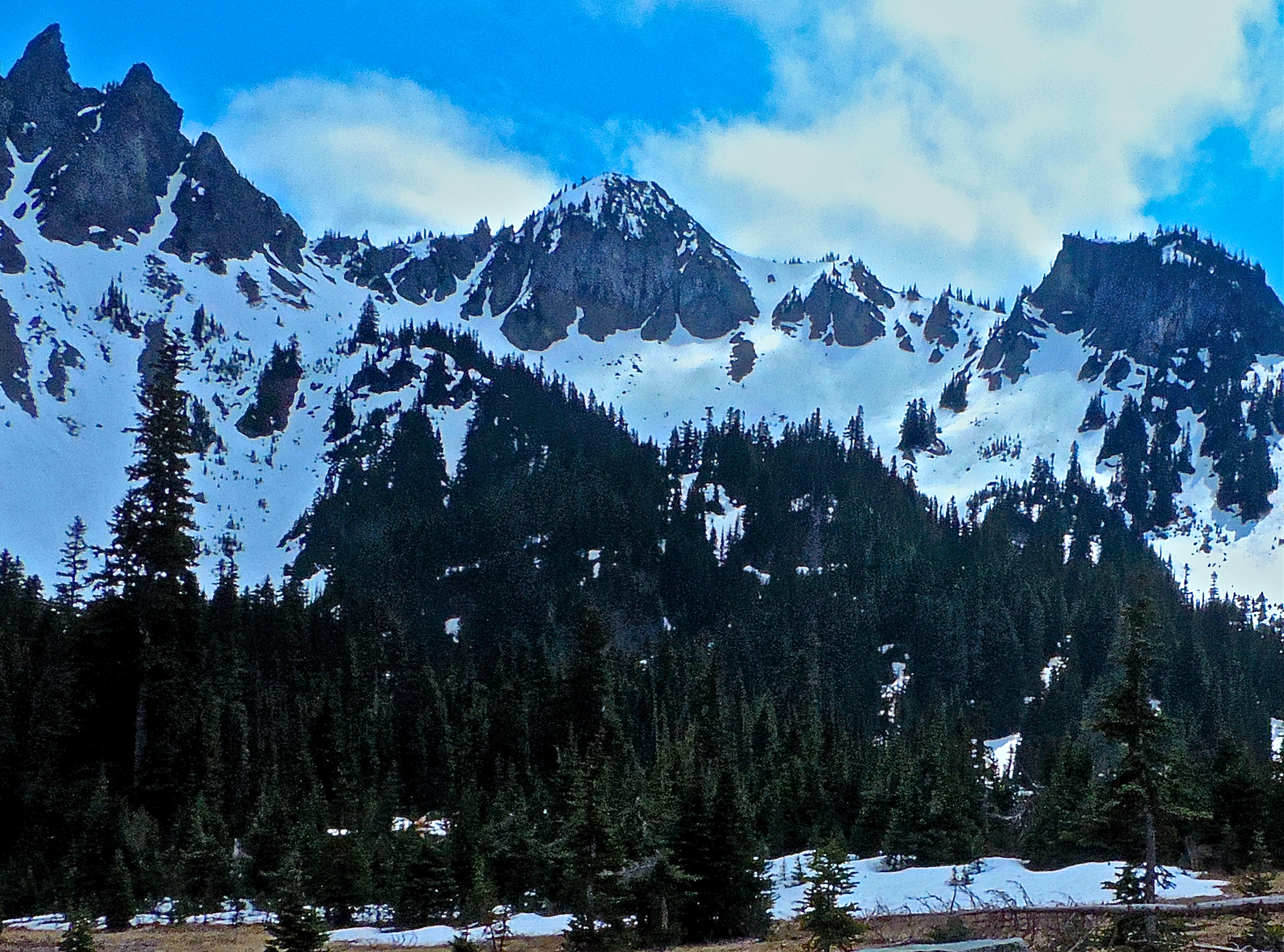
Barrier Peak (centered) seen from Owyhigh Lakes with Governors Needle (left)

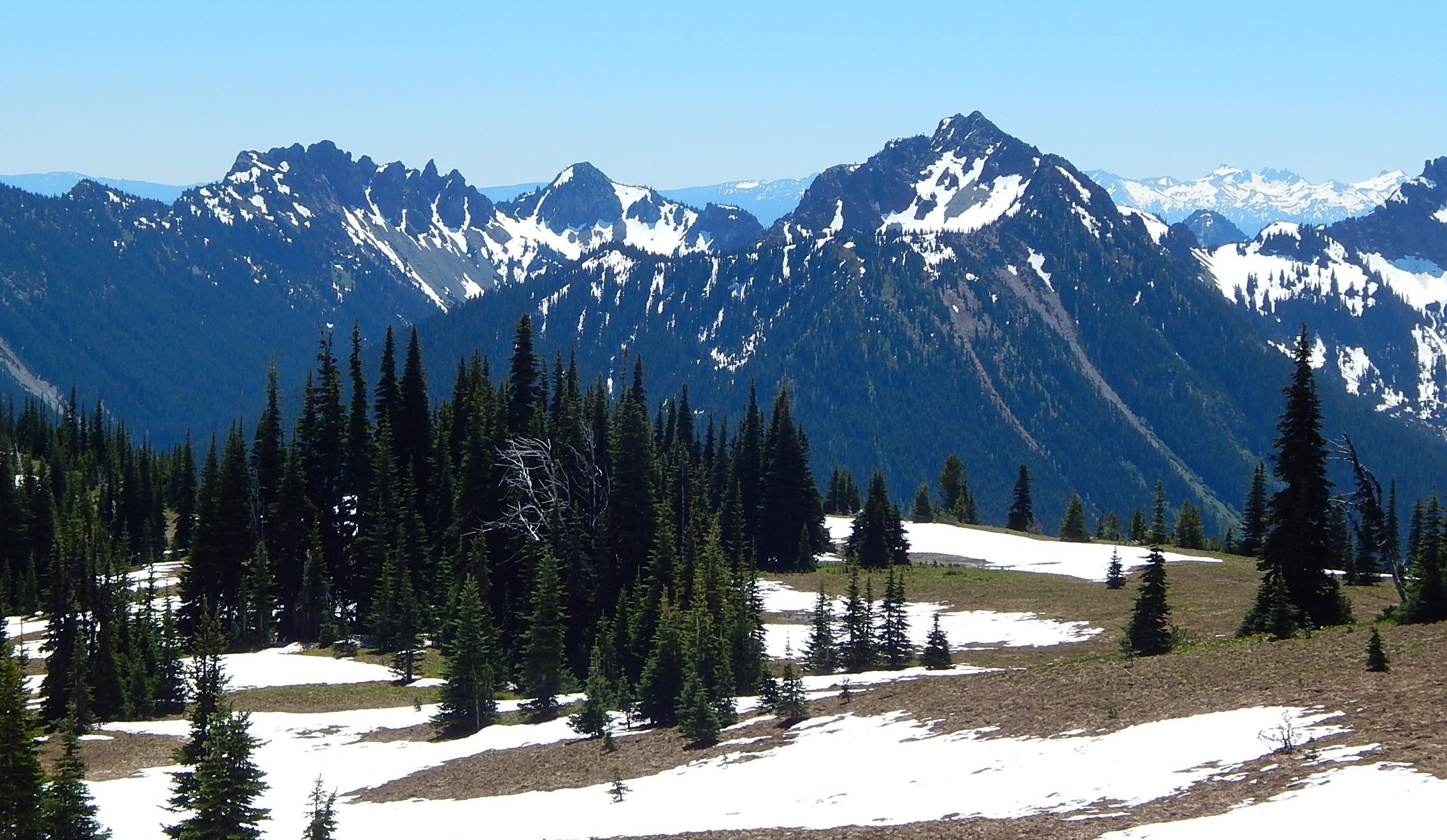
Governors Ridge, Barrier Peak, and Tamanos Mountain seen from the Sunrise area
