= Seymour Peak =

Mountain in Washington (state), United States

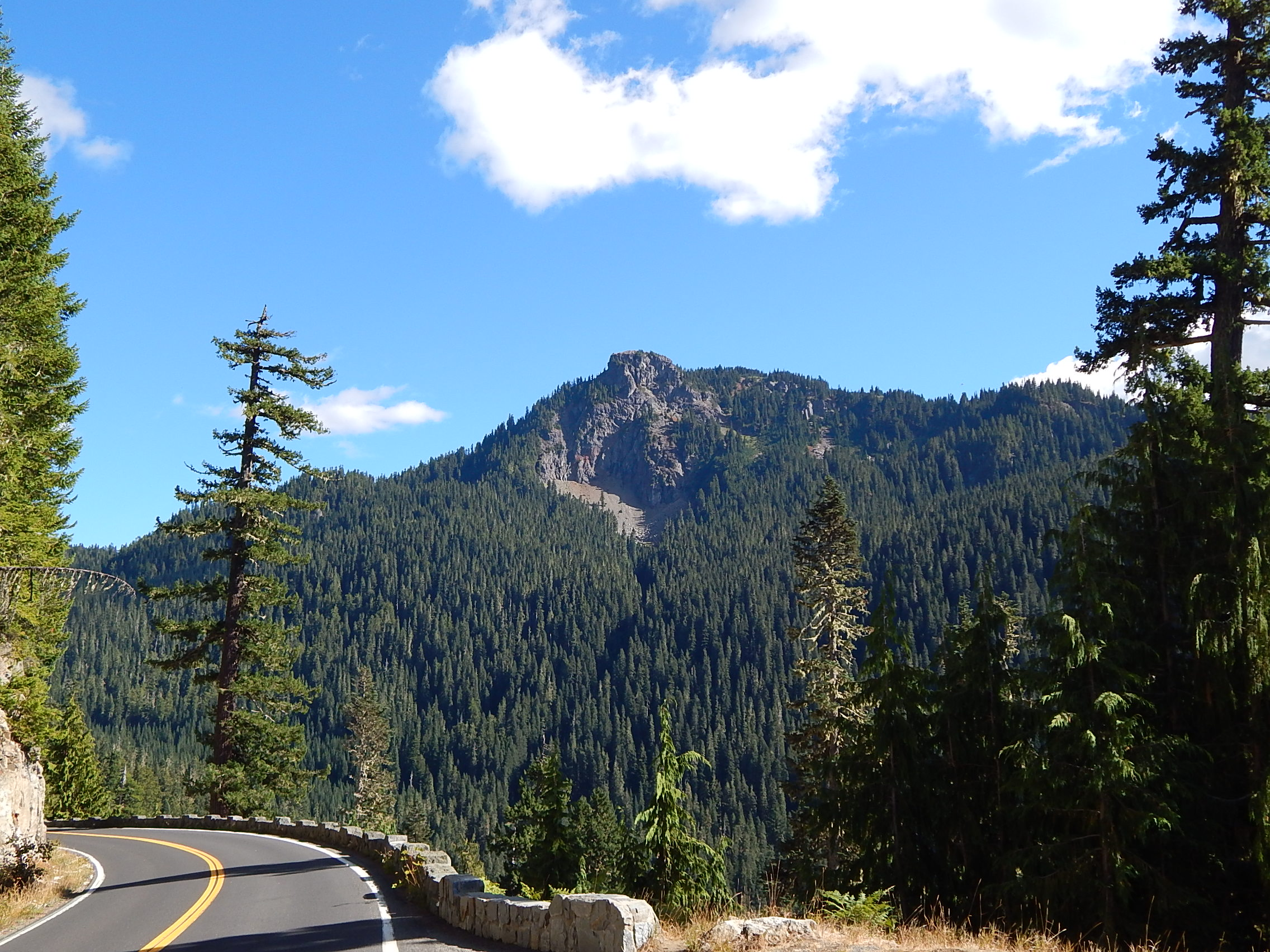
- Seymour Peak seen from Highway 123

Highest point
- Elevation: 6,337 ft (1,932 m)
- Prominence: 457 ft (139 m)
- Parent peak: Dewey Peak (6,710 ft)
- Isolation: 0.91 mi (1.46 km)
- Coordinates: 46°50′41″N 121°30′14″W

Geography
- Location within Washington (state) Location within the United States
- Country: United States
- State: Washington
- County: Pierce
- Protected area: Mount Rainier National Park
- Parent range: Cascades
- Topo map: USGS Chinook Pass

Climbing
- Easiest route: class 3 scrambling

Seymour Peak is a 6,337-foot-elevation (1,932-meter) mountain summit located in Mount Rainier National Park in Pierce County of Washington state. It is part of the Cascade Range and is situated southeast of Cayuse Pass and northeast of Shriner Peak. Its nearest higher neighbor is Dewey Peak, 0.79 mi (1.27 km) to the east. Precipitation runoff from Seymour Peak drains into tributaries of the Cowlitz River. Seymour Peak is named after William Wolcott Seymour (1861–1929), mayor of Tacoma, Washington, from 1911 to 1914. He was also a philanthropist, mountaineer, and a contributor to the scouting movement. This landform's toponym was officially adopted in 1932 by the U.S. Board on Geographic Names.

== Climate ==
Seymour Peak is located in the marine west coast climate zone of western North America. Most weather fronts originating in the Pacific Ocean travel northeast toward the Cascade Mountains. As fronts approach, they are forced upward by the peaks of the Cascade Range (orographic lift), causing them to drop their moisture in the form of rain or snow onto the Cascades. As a result, the west side of the Cascades experiences high precipitation, especially during the winter months in the form of snowfall. Because of maritime influence, snow tends to be wet and heavy, resulting in high avalanche danger. During winter months, weather is usually cloudy, but due to high pressure systems over the Pacific Ocean that intensify during summer months, there is often little or no cloud cover during the summer.

== See also ==
- Geology of the Pacific Northwest

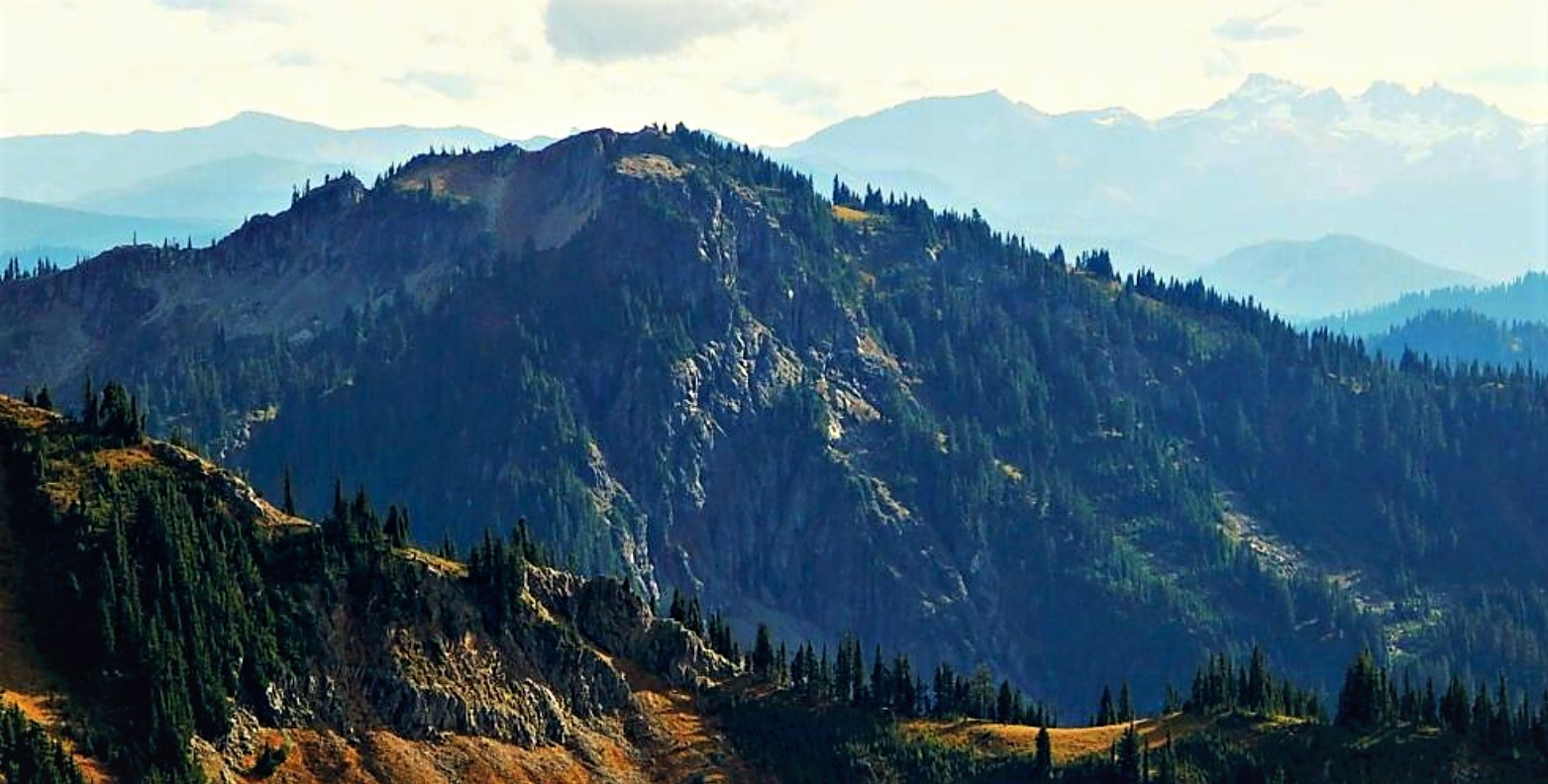
North aspect of Seymour Peak seen from Deadwood Peak
