= Shriner Peak =

Mountain in Washington (state), United States

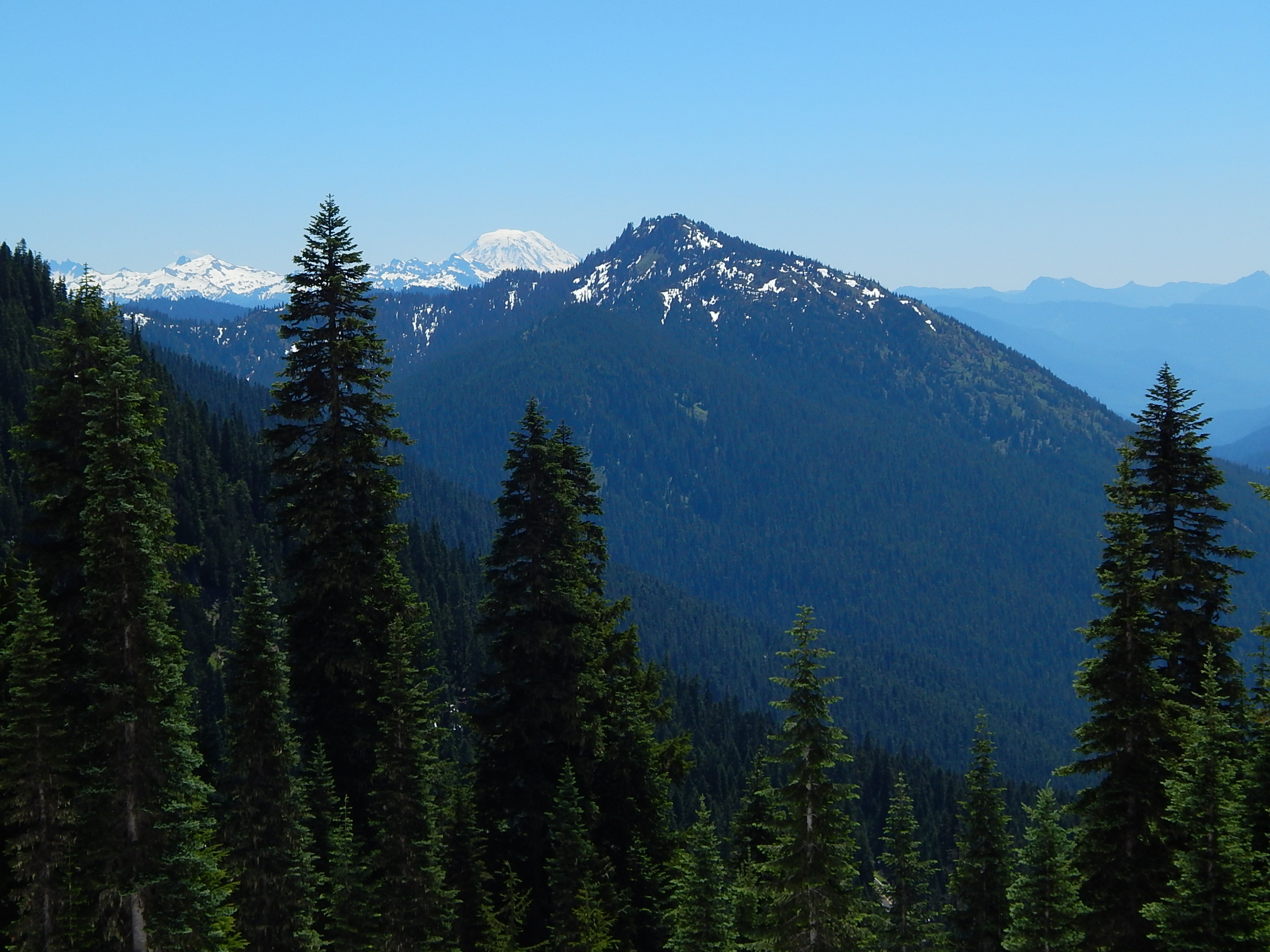
- Shriner Peak seen from Highway 410

Highest point
- Elevation: 5,834 ft (1,778 m)
- Prominence: 754 ft (230 m)
- Parent peak: Point 6057
- Isolation: 2.44 mi (3.93 km)
- Coordinates: 46°48′49″N 121°31′50″W

Geography
- Location within Washington (state) Location within the United States
- Country: United States
- State: Washington
- County: Pierce
- Protected area: Mount Rainier National Park
- Parent range: Cascades
- Topo map: USGS Chinook Pass

Climbing
- Easiest route: Hiking trail

Shriner Peak is a 5,834-foot-elevation (1,778-meter) mountain summit located in Mount Rainier National Park in Pierce County of Washington state. It is part of the Cascade Range and is situated south of Cayuse Pass, southwest of Seymour Peak, and southeast of Double Peak. A four-mile trail leads from Highway 123 to the Shriner Peak Fire Lookout at the top of the mountain. Precipitation runoff from Shriner Peak drains into tributaries of the Cowlitz River.

== Climate ==
Shriner Peak is located in the marine west coast climate zone of western North America. Most weather fronts originating in the Pacific Ocean travel northeast toward the Cascade Mountains. As fronts approach, they are forced upward by the peaks of the Cascade Range (orographic lift), causing them to drop their moisture in the form of rain or snow onto the Cascades. As a result, the west side of the Cascades experiences high precipitation, especially during the winter months in the form of snowfall. Because of maritime influence, snow tends to be wet and heavy, resulting in high avalanche danger. During winter months, weather is usually cloudy, but due to high pressure systems over the Pacific Ocean that intensify during summer months, there is often little or no cloud cover during the summer.
