= Double Peak (San Diego County, California) =

Mountain in California, United States of America

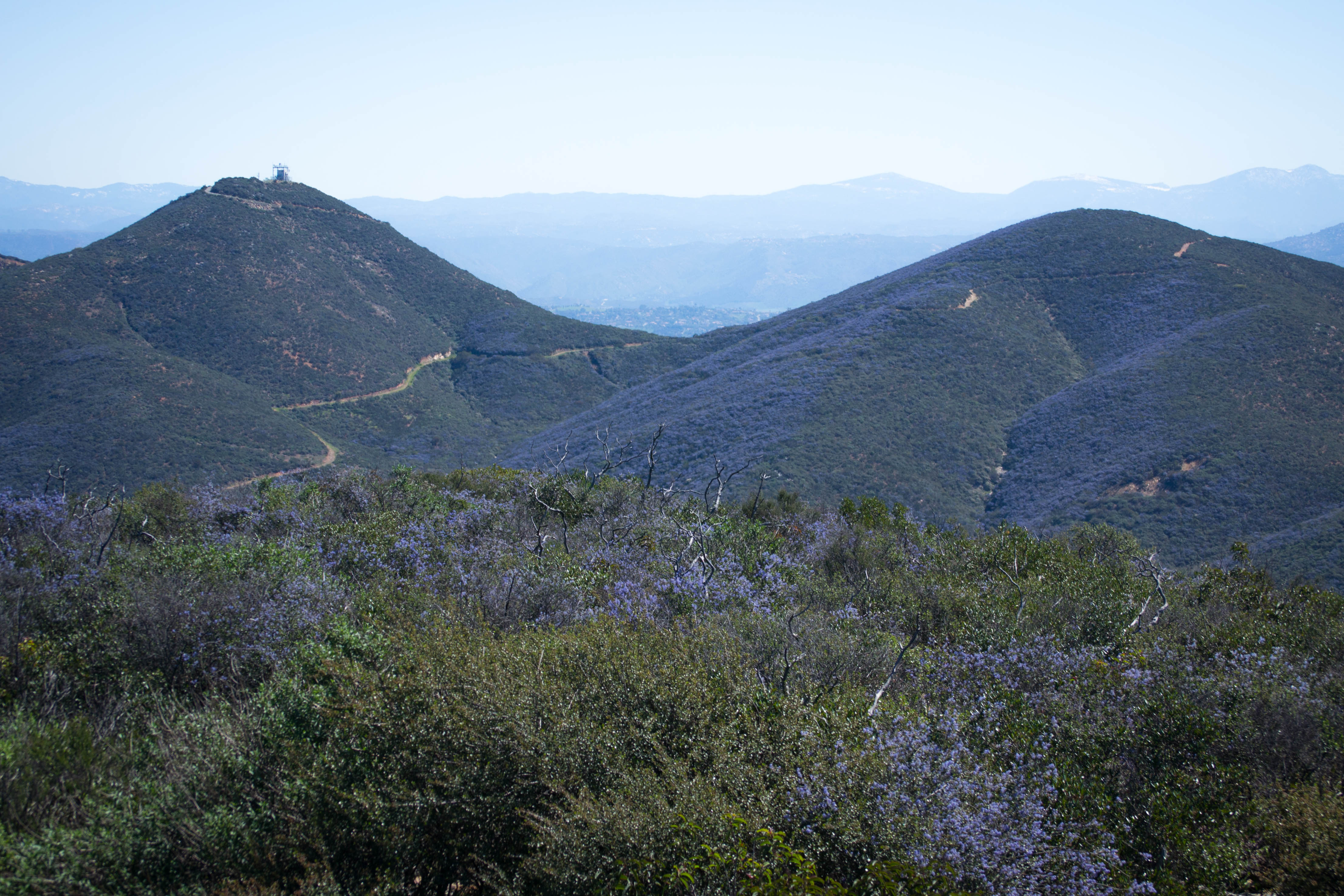

Highest point
- Elevation: 1,646 ft (502 m) NAVD 88
- Prominence: 464 ft (141 m)
- Coordinates: 33°06′34″N 117°10′39″W

Geography
- Location: San Diego County, California, U.S.
- Topo map: USGS Rancho Santa Fe

Double Peak is located south of San Marcos, California. The elevation at the summit is 1,646 ft (502 m), and approximately 1,000 feet (305 m) above the north foot of the mountain. Most trails leading to the summit of Double Peak are classified as "moderately strenuous."

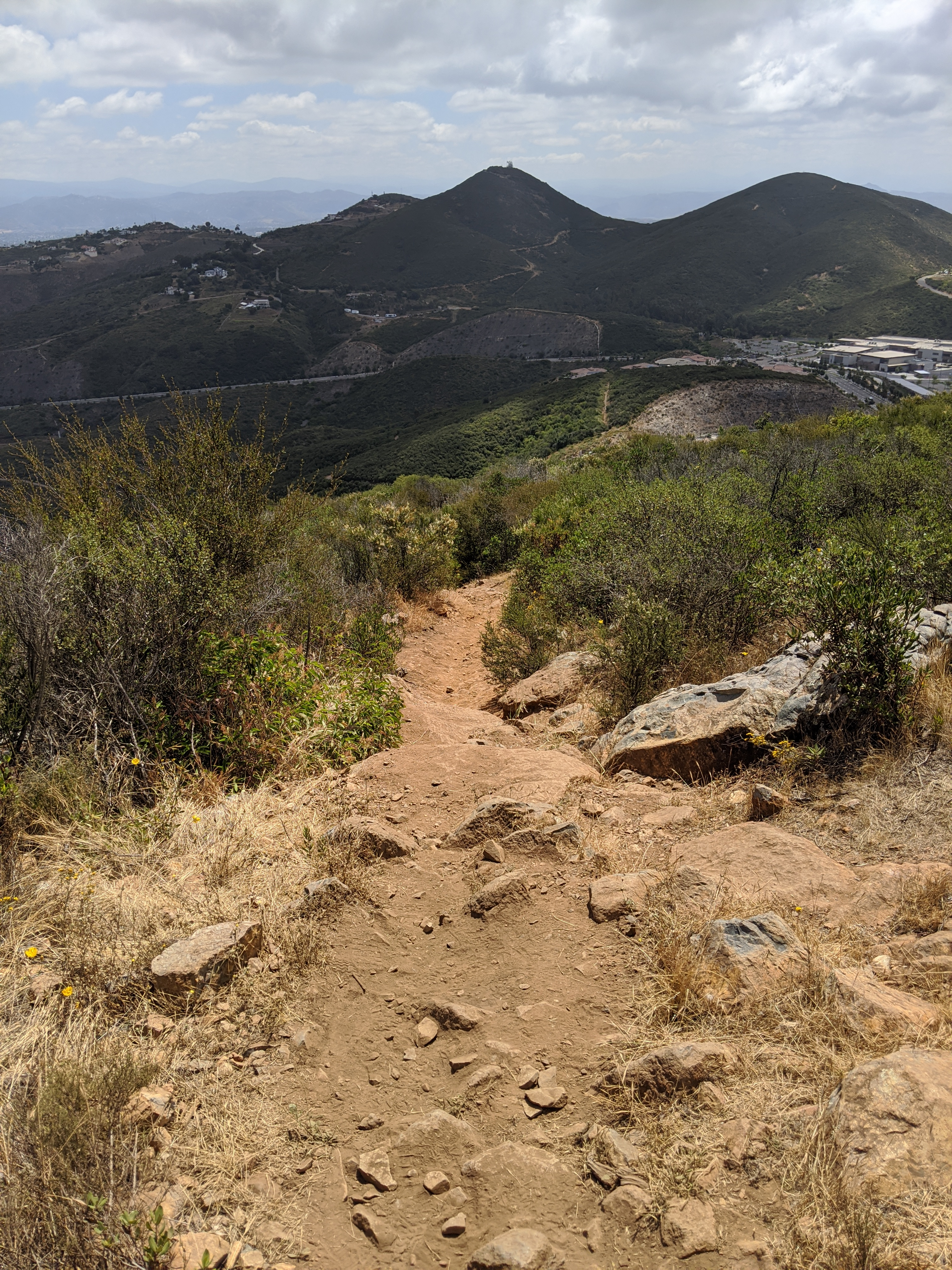
Eastern trail

Double Peak is a popular hiking and biking area due to its many trails and convenient access points. On the north side, the mountain can be accessed by hikers and bikers through Discovery Lake Park, but this trailhead is closed to motorized vehicles. On the south side, the mountain can be accessed by vehicles through Double Peak Drive, extending from the neighborhood of San Elijo Hills. Both the North and the South access trails offer wide, partially paved surfaces. There is also a less-accessible rock and dirt trail which allows summiting the mountain from the East side. The Eastern trail has a steep incline, with rugged, staircase-like rock extrusions and at some points, loosely packed shale. The Eastern trail can only be accessed by following other trails along either the north or south face of the mountain, around to the eastern face of the mountain.

Accessing the mountain from the north side, at Discovery Lake Park, a City of San Marcos information sign states that the length of the trail is 2.5 mi (4 km) from the park to the summit.

On a clear day, the peak offers views of distant places such as Mexico, downtown San Diego, San Clemente Island, Catalina Island, the Palos Verdes Peninsula, the Santa Ana Mountains, and the San Bernardino Mountains. A telescope is located at the peak for use by visitors.

== Gallery ==
Below shows various views from the top of Double Peak.

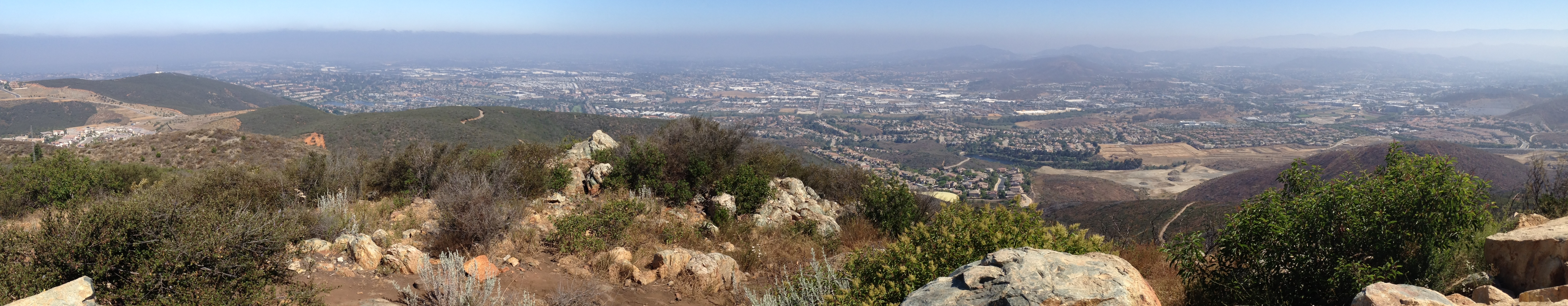
Looking north
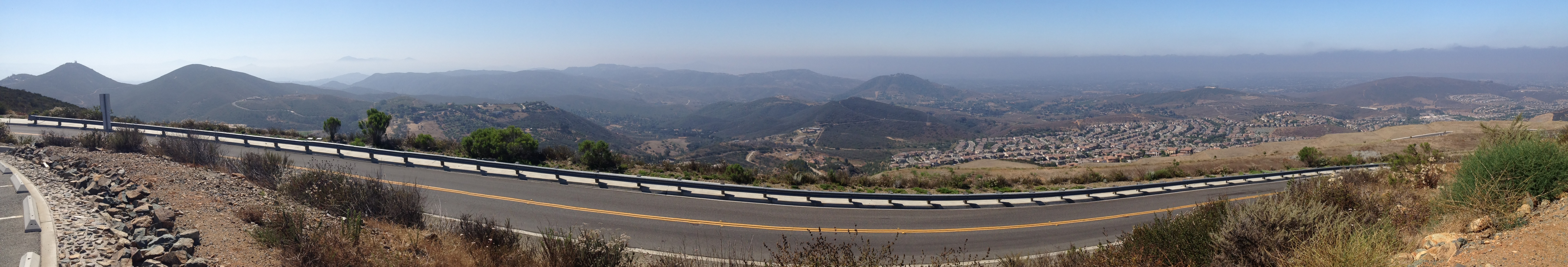
Looking south
