= Governors Ridge =

Part of Cascade Range in Mount Rainier National Park, Washington state

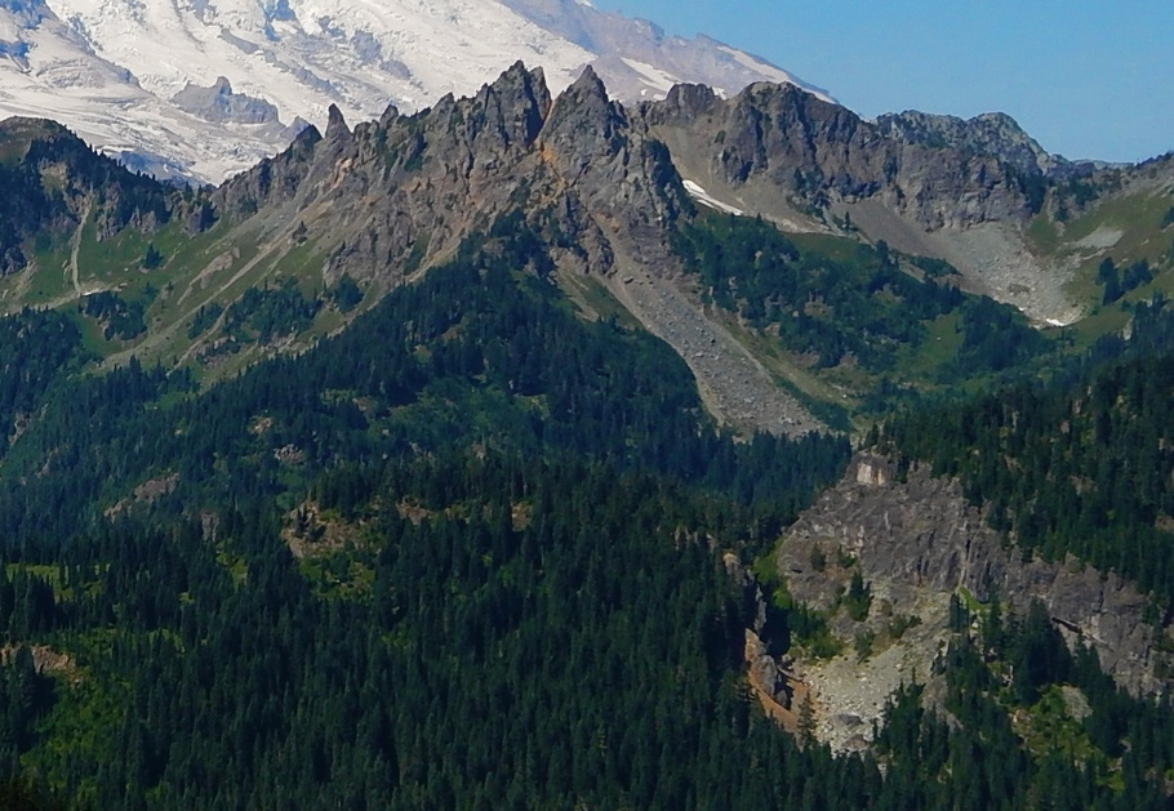
- Governors Ridge from the east near Tipsoo Lake

Highest point
- Elevation: 6,600 ft (2,012 m)
- Prominence: 1,240 ft (378 m)
- Parent peak: Tamanos Mountain
- Isolation: 1.25 mi (2.01 km)
- Coordinates: 46°51′53″N 121°34′24″W

Geography
- Location within Washington (state) Location within the United States
- Country: United States
- State: Washington
- County: Pierce
- Protected area: Mount Rainier National Park
- Parent range: Cascades
- Topo map: USGS Chinook Pass

Climbing
- Easiest route: Scrambling class 3

Governors Ridge is located in Mount Rainier National Park in Pierce County of Washington state. It is part of the Cascade Range and is situated west of Cayuse Pass and 1.09 mile east of Tamanos Mountain, which is the nearest higher peak. Precipitation runoff from Governors Ridge drains into tributaries of the White River and Cowlitz River. The toponym honors all the governors who have served the state of Washington. The highest rocky crag on the ridge is known as Governors Peak. There is also a 40-foot leaning spire known as Governors Needle, and Barrier Peak is at the southern culmination of the ridge. The normal climbing access is from the Owyhigh Lakes Trail.

== Climate ==
Governors Ridge is located in the marine west coast climate zone of western North America. Most weather fronts originating in the Pacific Ocean travel northeast toward the Cascade Mountains. As fronts approach, they are forced upward by the peaks of the Cascade Range (orographic lift), causing them to drop their moisture in the form of rain or snow onto the Cascades. As a result, the west side of the Cascades experiences high precipitation, especially during the winter months in the form of snowfall. Because of maritime influence, snow tends to be wet and heavy, resulting in high avalanche danger. During winter months, weather is usually cloudy, but due to high pressure systems over the Pacific Ocean that intensify during summer months, there is often little or no cloud cover during the summer.
