= Tamanos Mountain =

Mountain in Washington (state), United States

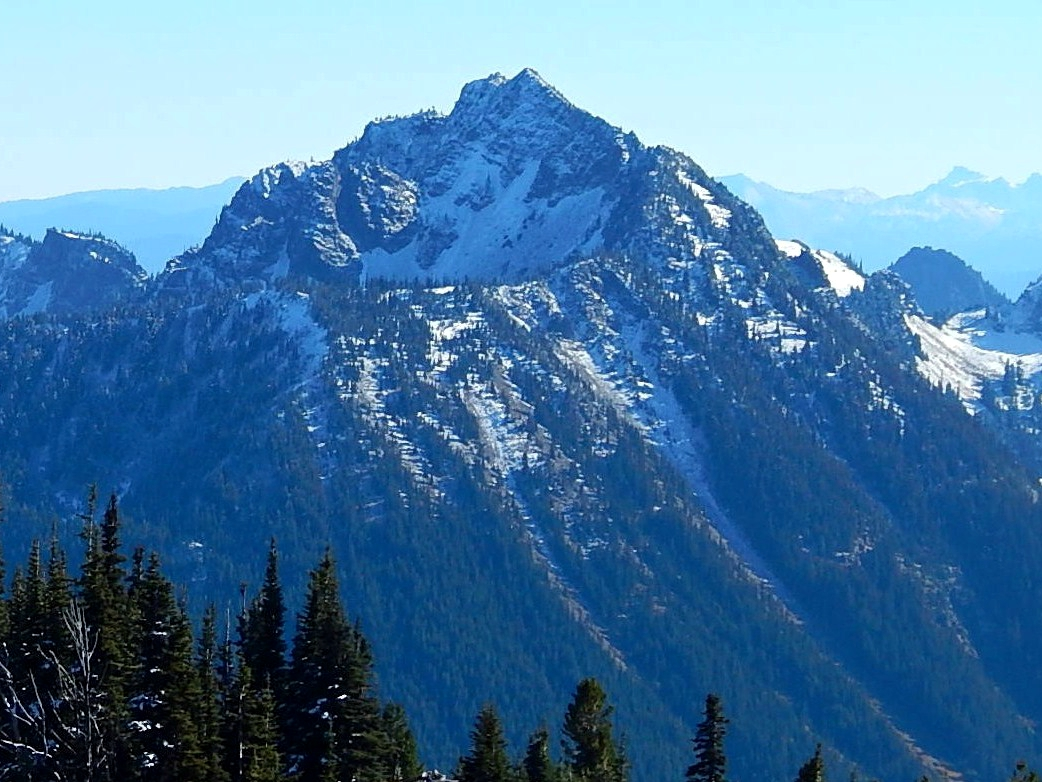
- Tamanos Mountain seen from Sourdough Ridge

Highest point
- Elevation: 6,790 ft (2,070 m)
- Prominence: 750 ft (229 m)
- Parent peak: Cowlitz Chimneys (7,015 ft)
- Isolation: 1.21 mi (1.95 km)
- Coordinates: 46°52′19″N 121°35′51″W

Geography
- Location within Washington (state) Location within the United States
- Country: United States
- State: Washington
- County: Pierce
- Protected area: Mount Rainier National Park
- Parent range: Cascades
- Topo map: USGS Chinook Pass

Climbing
- Easiest route: Scrambling class 3

Tamanos Mountain is a 6,790-foot (2,070 m) summit located in Mount Rainier National Park in Pierce County of Washington state. It is part of the Cascade Range. Tamanos Mountain is situated west of Governors Ridge and northeast of the Cowlitz Chimneys, all of which can be seen from the Sunrise Historic District. The name tamanos derives from Chinook Jargon and has the meaning of guardian spirit. This landform's toponym was officially adopted by the U.S. Board on Geographic Names in 1932. Topographic relief is significant as the summit rises 3,100 feet (940 meters) above the White River in approximately 1.5 mile. The normal climbing access is from the Owyhigh Lakes Trail, and from the lakes scrambling up the south slope to the summit.

== Climate ==
Tamanos Mountain is located in the marine west coast climate zone of western North America. Most weather fronts originating in the Pacific Ocean travel northeast toward the Cascade Mountains. As fronts approach, they are forced upward by the peaks of the Cascade Range (orographic lift), causing them to drop their moisture in the form of rain or snow onto the Cascades. As a result, the west side of the Cascades experiences high precipitation, especially during the winter months in the form of snowfall. Because of maritime influence, snow tends to be wet and heavy, resulting in high avalanche danger. During winter months, weather is usually cloudy, but due to high pressure systems over the Pacific Ocean that intensify during summer months, there is often little or no cloud cover during the summer. Precipitation runoff from Tamanos Mountain drains into the White River.

== See also ==
- Geography of Washington (state)
- Geology of the Pacific Northwest
- List of mountain peaks of Washington (state)

== Gallery ==
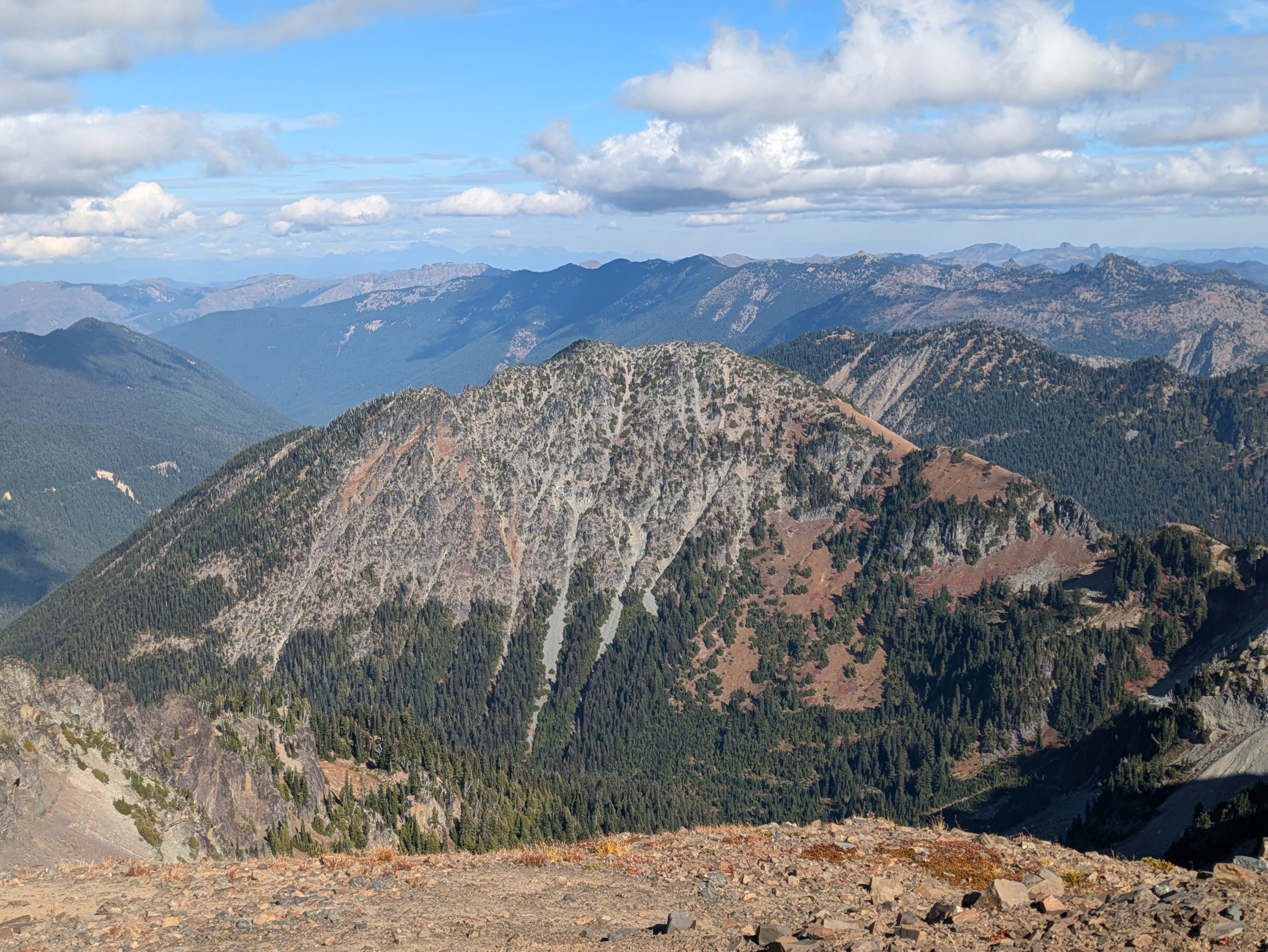
Southwest aspect of Tamanos Mountain from near Banshee Peak, October 2024

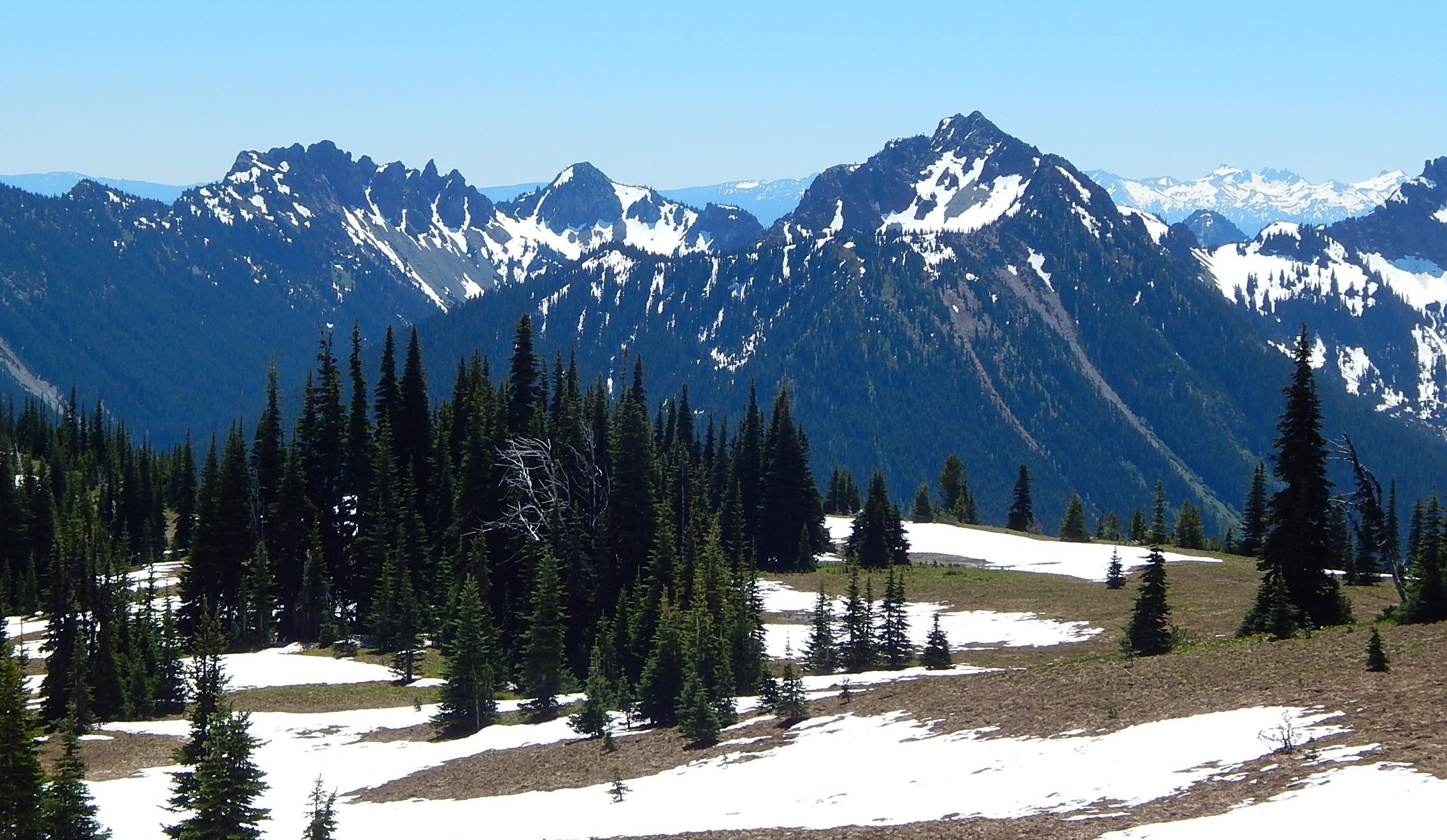
Governors Ridge left, Tamanos right

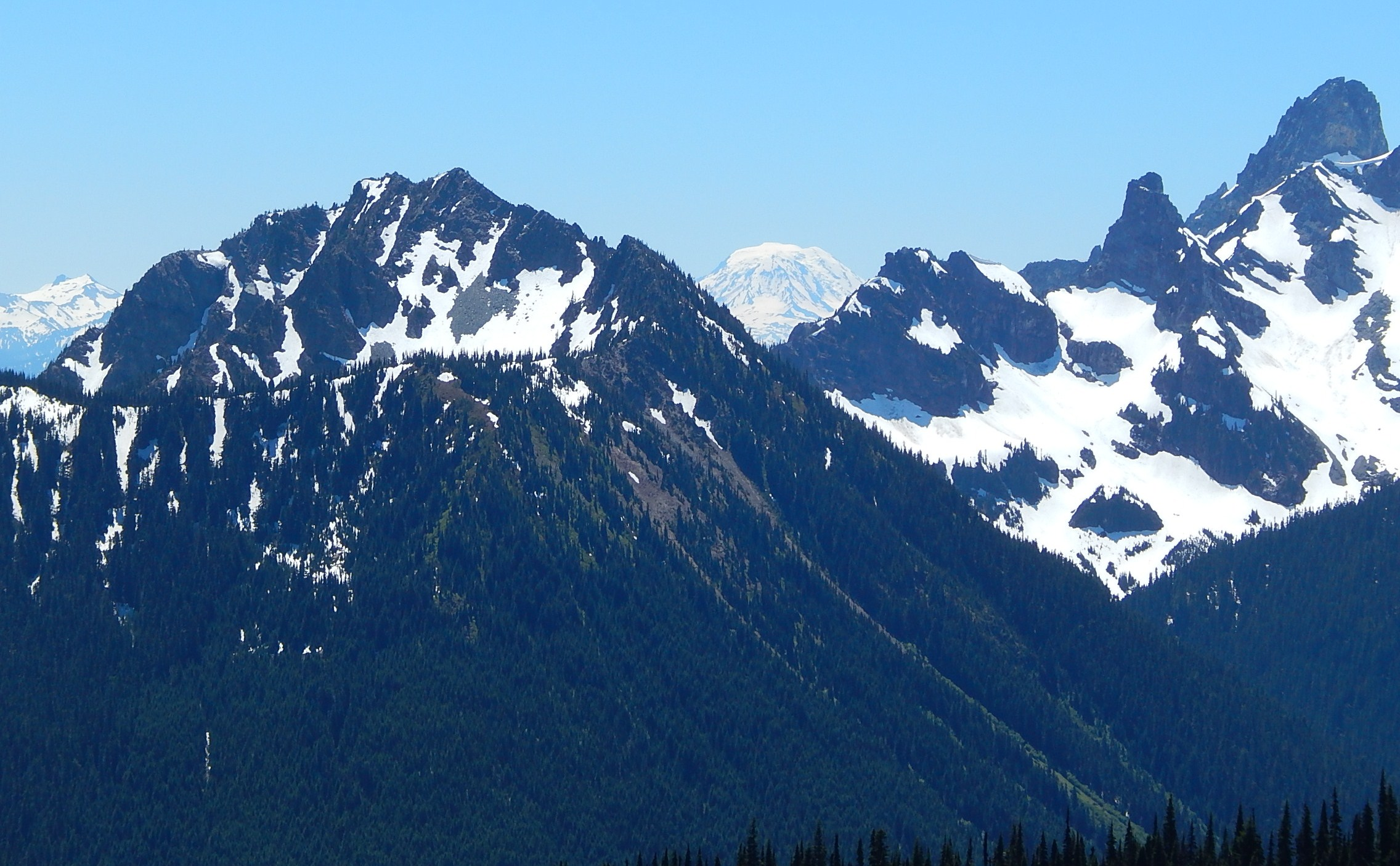
Tamanos (left), Mt. Adams, Cowlitz Chimneys (right) from Sourdough Ridge

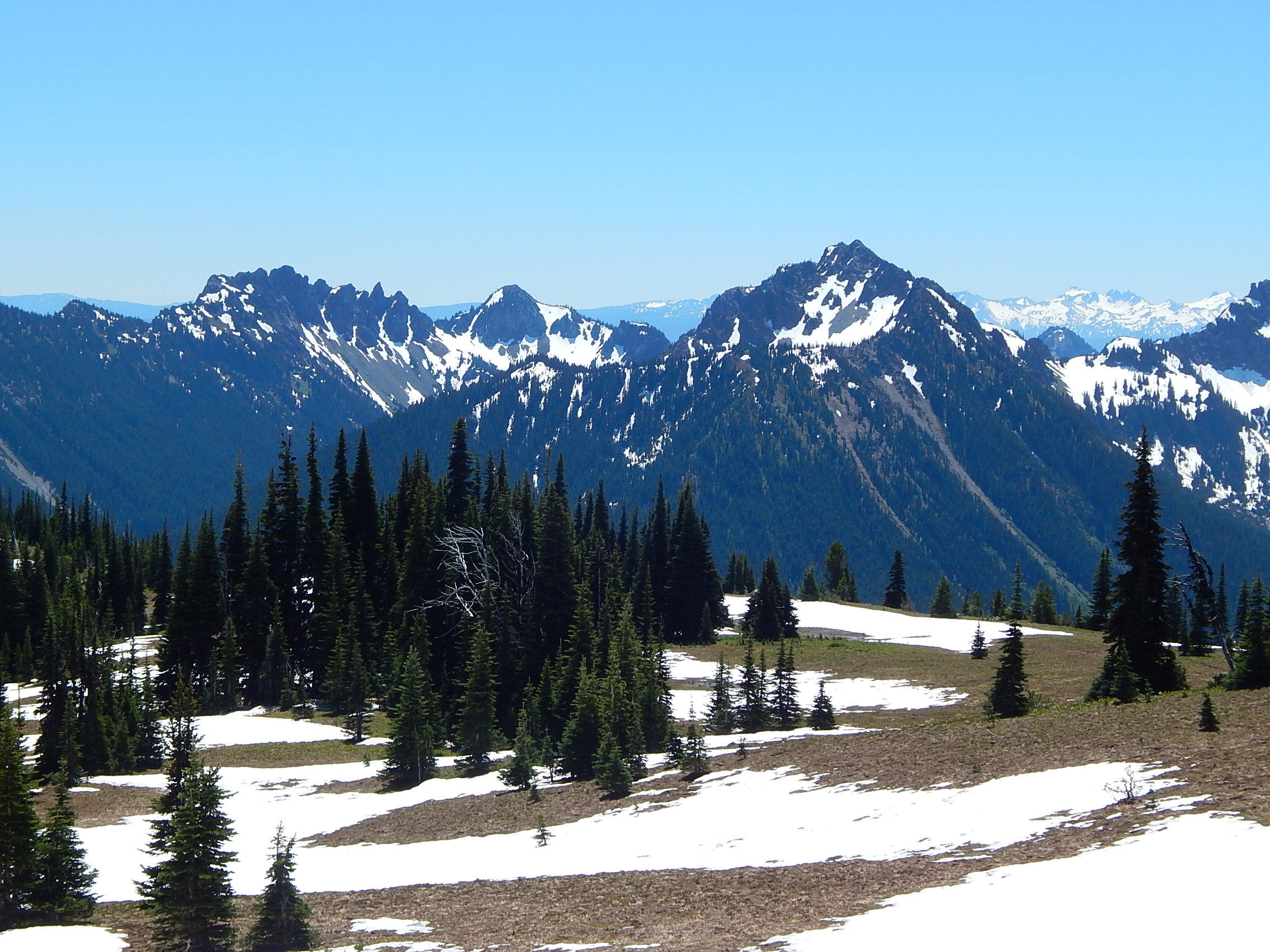
Tamanos Mountain to right of center
