= National Register of Historic Places listings in Mount Rainier National Park =

This is a list of the National Register of Historic Places listings in Mount Rainier National Park.

This is intended to be a complete list of the properties and districts on the National Register of Historic Places in Mount Rainier National Park, Washington, United States. The locations of National Register properties and districts for which the latitude and longitude coordinates are included below, may be seen in a Google map.

There are 44 properties and districts listed on the National Register in the park, four of which are National Historic Landmarks. The entire park has been designated a National Historic Landmark District.

This National Park Service list is complete through NPS recent listings posted August 21, 2026.

== Current listings ==
	Name on the Register	Image	Date listed	Location	City or town	Description
1	Camp Muir	Camp Muir	March 13, 1991 (#91000176)	Paradise; 46°50′07″N 121°43′58″W	Mount Rainier National Park	Also known as Cloud Camp, is on the southeast slope of the mountain, at 10,062 feet (3,067 m). Named for John Muir.
2	Chinook Pass Entrance Arch	Chinook Pass Entrance Arch	March 13, 1991 (#91000202)	Chinook Pass; 46°52′20″N 121°30′52″W	Mount Rainier National Park	
3	Christine Falls Bridge	Christine Falls Bridge	March 13, 1991 (#91000196)	Paradise; 46°46′51″N 121°46′47″W	Mount Rainier National Park	
4	Edith Creek Chlorination House	Edith Creek Chlorination House	March 13, 1991 (#91000201)	Paradise; 46°47′38″N 121°43′54″W	Mount Rainier National Park	
5	Gobbler's Knob Fire Lookout	Gobbler's Knob Fire Lookout	March 13, 1991 (#91000191)	Nisqually Entrance; 46°47′39″N 121°54′48″W	Mount Rainier National Park	
6	Huckleberry Creek Patrol Cabin		March 13, 1991 (#91000178)	Sunrise; 46°59′41″N 121°37′03″W	Mount Rainier National Park	
7	Indian Bar Trail Shelter	Indian Bar Trail Shelter	March 13, 1991 (#91000179)	Paradise; 46°49′33″N 121°38′19″W	Mount Rainier National Park	
8	Indian Henry's Patrol Cabin	Indian Henry's Patrol Cabin	March 13, 1991 (#91000180)	Longmire; 46°47′39″N 121°50′20″W	Mount Rainier National Park	The structure was stabilized in 1978 with 300 lb (140 kg). footings.
9	Ipsut Creek Patrol Cabin	Ipsut Creek Patrol Cabin	March 13, 1991 (#91000181)	Carbon River Entrance; 46°58′40″N 121°49′54″W	Mount Rainier National Park	
10	Lake George Patrol Cabin	Lake George Patrol Cabin	March 13, 1991 (#91000182)	Longmire; 46°47′36″N 121°54′07″W	Mount Rainier National Park	
11	Longmire Buildings	Longmire Buildings	May 28, 1987 (#87001338)	Longmire; 46°45′06″N 121°48′42″W	Mount Rainier National Park	National Historic Landmark.
12	Longmire Campground Comfort Station No. L-302	Longmire Campground Comfort Station No. L-302	March 13, 1991 (#91000209)	Longmire; 46°44′47″N 121°48′41″W	Mount Rainier National Park	
13	Longmire Campground Comfort Station No. L-303	Longmire Campground Comfort Station No. L-303	March 13, 1991 (#91000210)	Longmire; 46°44′41″N 121°48′41″W	Mount Rainier National Park	
14	Longmire Campground Comfort Station No. L-304		March 13, 1991 (#91000211)	Longmire; 46°44′36″N 121°48′44″W	Mount Rainier National Park	
15	Longmire Historic District	Longmire Historic District	March 13, 1991 (#91000173)	Longmire; 46°44′59″N 121°48′45″W	Mount Rainier National Park	
16	Mount Rainier National Park	Mount Rainier National Park	February 18, 1997 (#97000344)	Longmire; 46°52′59″N 121°53′04″W	Mount Rainier National Park	The park is a National Historic Landmark District, which includes 165 contributing structures and buildings.
17	Mt. Fremont Fire Lookout	Mt. Fremont Fire Lookout	March 13, 1991 (#91000193)	Sunrise; 46°56′03″N 121°40′30″W	Mount Rainier National Park	
18	Mowich Lake Patrol Cabin	Mowich Lake Patrol Cabin	March 13, 1991 (#91000183)	Carbon River Entrance; 46°56′05″N 121°51′40″W	Mount Rainier National Park	
19	Narada Falls Bridge	Narada Falls Bridge	March 13, 1991 (#91000197)	Paradise; 46°46′31″N 121°44′43″W	Mount Rainier National Park	
20	Narada Falls Comfort Station	Narada Falls Comfort Station	March 13, 1991 (#91000208)	Paradise; 46°46′33″N 121°44′40″W	Mount Rainier National Park	
21	Nisqually Entrance Historic District	Nisqually Entrance Historic District	March 13, 1991 (#91000172)	Nisqually Entrance; 46°44′27″N 121°55′09″W	Mount Rainier National Park	
22	North Mowich Trail Shelter		March 13, 1991 (#91000184)	Mowich Lake Entrance; 46°54′55″N 121°53′34″W	Mount Rainier National Park	
23	Ohanapecosh Comfort Station No. O-302	Ohanapecosh Comfort Station No. O-302	March 13, 1991 (#91000203)	Ohanapecosh; 46°44′13″N 121°33′53″W	Mount Rainier National Park	
24	Ohanapecosh Comfort Station No. O-303	Ohanapecosh Comfort Station No. O-303	March 13, 1991 (#91000204)	Ohanapecosh; 46°44′10″N 121°34′01″W	Mount Rainier National Park	
25	Paradise Historic District	Paradise Historic District	March 13, 1991 (#91000174)	Paradise; 46°47′10″N 121°44′07″W	Mount Rainier National Park	
26	Paradise Inn	Paradise Inn	May 28, 1987 (#87001336)	Paradise; 46°47′13″N 121°43′57″W	Mount Rainier National Park	Opened in 1917, and built in the National Park Service Rustic style of architecture. National Historic Landmark.
27	Shriner Peak Fire Lookout	Shriner Peak Fire Lookout	March 13, 1991 (#91000194)	Ohanapecosh; 46°48′50″N 121°31′46″W	Mount Rainier National Park	
28	South Puyallup River Bridge	South Puyallup River Bridge	March 13, 1991 (#91000198)	Nisqually Entrance; 46°48′29″N 121°53′26″W	Mount Rainier National Park	Built in 1931.
29	St. Andrews Creek Bridge	St. Andrews Creek Bridge	March 13, 1991 (#91000199)	Nisqually Entrance; 46°50′10″N 121°54′15″W	Mount Rainier National Park	Built in 1931.
30	St. Andrews Patrol Cabin	St. Andrews Patrol Cabin	March 13, 1991 (#91000188)	Nisqually Entrance; 46°50′10″N 121°54′10″W	Mount Rainier National Park	
31	Summerland Trail Shelter	Summerland Trail Shelter	March 13, 1991 (#91000185)	Sunrise; 46°51′55″N 121°39′28″W	Mount Rainier National Park	
32	Sunrise Comfort Station		March 13, 1991 (#91000207)	Sunrise; 46°54′40″N 121°39′32″W	Mount Rainier National Park	
33	Sunrise Historic District	Sunrise Historic District	March 13, 1991 (#91000175)	Sunrise; 46°54′53″N 121°38′32″W	Mount Rainier National Park	
34	Sunset Park Patrol Cabin	Sunset Park Patrol Cabin	March 13, 1991 (#91000186)	Mowich Lake Entrance; 46°52′58″N 121°53′54″W	Mount Rainier National Park	
35	Sunset Park Trail Shelter		March 13, 1991 (#91000187)	Mowich Lake Entrance; 46°52′59″N 121°53′49″W	Mount Rainier National Park	
36	Tahoma Vista Comfort Station		March 13, 1991 (#91000205)	Nisqually Entrance; 46°47′43″N 121°52′51″W	Mount Rainier National Park	
37	Three Lakes Patrol Cabin	Three Lakes Patrol Cabin	March 13, 1991 (#91000189)	Mt. Rainier National Park; 46°45′51″N 121°28′21″W	Ohanapecosh	
38	Tipsoo Lake Comfort Station	Tipsoo Lake Comfort Station	March 13, 1991 (#91000206)	Chinook Pass; 46°52′13″N 121°31′09″W	Mount Rainier National Park	
39	Tolmie Peak Fire Lookout	Tolmie Peak Fire Lookout	March 13, 1991 (#91000195)	Mowich Lake Entrance; 46°57′28″N 121°52′49″W	Mount Rainier National Park	
40	White River Bridge	White River Bridge	March 13, 1991 (#91000200)	White River Entrance; 46°53′53″N 121°37′04″W	Mount Rainier National Park	
41	White River Entrance	White River Entrance	March 13, 1991 (#91000177)	White River Entrance; 46°54′09″N 121°33′16″W	Mount Rainier National Park	District consists of 49 acres (20 ha) and three buildings.
42	White River Mess Hall and Dormitory	White River Mess Hall and Dormitory	March 13, 1991 (#91000328)	White River Entrance; 46°54′08″N 121°33′16″W	Mount Rainier National Park	
43	White River Patrol Cabin	White River Patrol Cabin	March 13, 1991 (#91000190)	White River Entrance; 46°54′10″N 121°38′15″W	Mount Rainier National Park	
44	Yakima Park Stockade Group	Yakima Park Stockade Group	May 28, 1987 (#87001337)	Sunrise (Yakima Park); 46°54′49″N 121°38′32″W	Mount Rainier National Park	Founded c. 1935, the district consists of 35 acres (14 ha), three buildings, one structure, and one object. National Historic Landmark.

== See also ==
- National Register of Historic Places listings in Lewis County, Washington
- National Register of Historic Places listings in Pierce County, Washington
- List of National Historic Landmarks in Washington (state)
- National Register of Historic Places listings in Washington
