= South Puyallup River Bridge =

- U.S. National Register of Historic Places
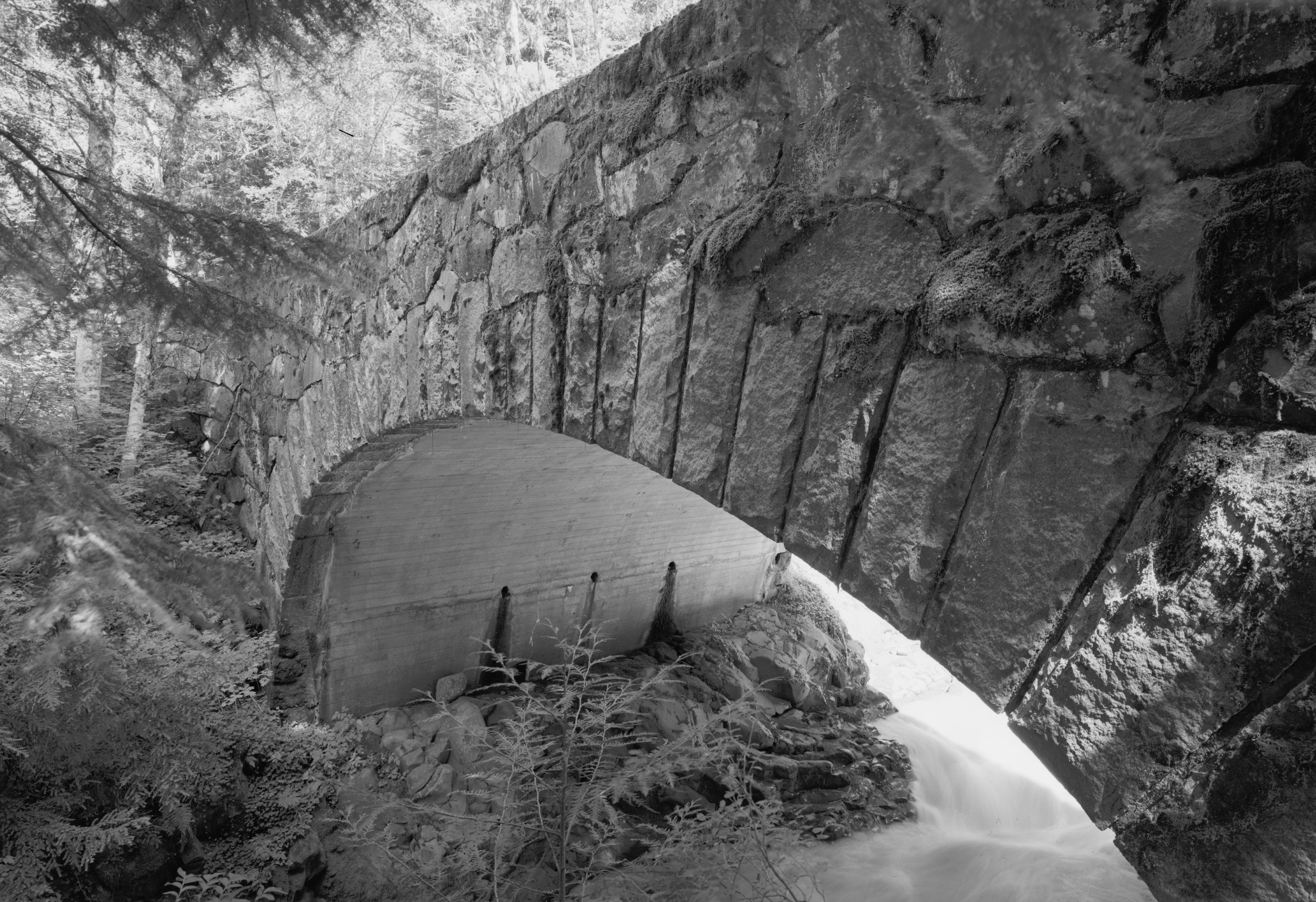

- Location within Washington (state)
- Nearest city: Nisqually Entrance, Washington
- Coordinates: 46°48′29″N 121°53′31″W
- Area: less than one acre
- Built: 1931
- Architectural style: Rustic style
- MPS: Mount Rainier National Park MPS
- NRHP reference No.: 91000198
- Added to NRHP: March 13, 1991

The South Puyallup River Bridge was built in 1930–31 in Mount Rainier National Park as part of the West Side Road project, planned to link the park's Nisqually and Carbon River entrances. The stone-faced reinforced concrete bridge was designed by the National Park Service and the Bureau of Public Roads. It spans 42 feet (13 m) and is almost 35 feet (11 m) wide, carrying two lanes of traffic.

The bridge was placed on the National Register of Historic Places on March 13, 1991. It is part of the Mount Rainier National Historic Landmark District, which encompasses the entire park and which recognizes the park's inventory of Park Service-designed rustic architecture.

== See also ==
- List of bridges documented by the Historic American Engineering Record in Washington (state)
