= Tahoma Vista Comfort Station =

- U.S. National Register of Historic Places
- Location within Washington (state)
- Nearest city: Nisqually Entrance, Washington
- Coordinates: 46°47′43″N 121°52′51″W
- Area: less than one acre
- Built: 1931
- Architectural style: Rustic style
- MPS: Mt. Rainier National Park MPS
- NRHP reference No.: 91000205
- Added to NRHP: March 13, 1991

The Tahoma Vista Comfort Station was designed by the National Park Service Branch of Plans and Designs in the National Park Service Rustic style and built in Mount Rainier National Park by the Civilian Conservation Corps in 1931. The design was supervised by Park Service Chief Architect Thomas Chalmers Vint, and site selection and development were undertaken by Park Service landscape architect Ernest A. Davidson. The comfort station serves the Tahoma Vista Overlook, also designed by Davidson. The 14-foot (4.3 m) by 30-foot (9.1 m) public toilet facility features rough stonework to window sill level, with a framed wall above and a log-framed roof with cedar shingles.

The Tahoma Vista Comfort Station was placed on the National Register of Historic Places on March 13, 1991. It is part of the Mount Rainier National Historic Landmark District, which encompasses the entire park and which recognizes the park's inventory of Park Service-designed rustic architecture.
