= St. Andrews Patrol Cabin =

- U.S. National Register of Historic Places
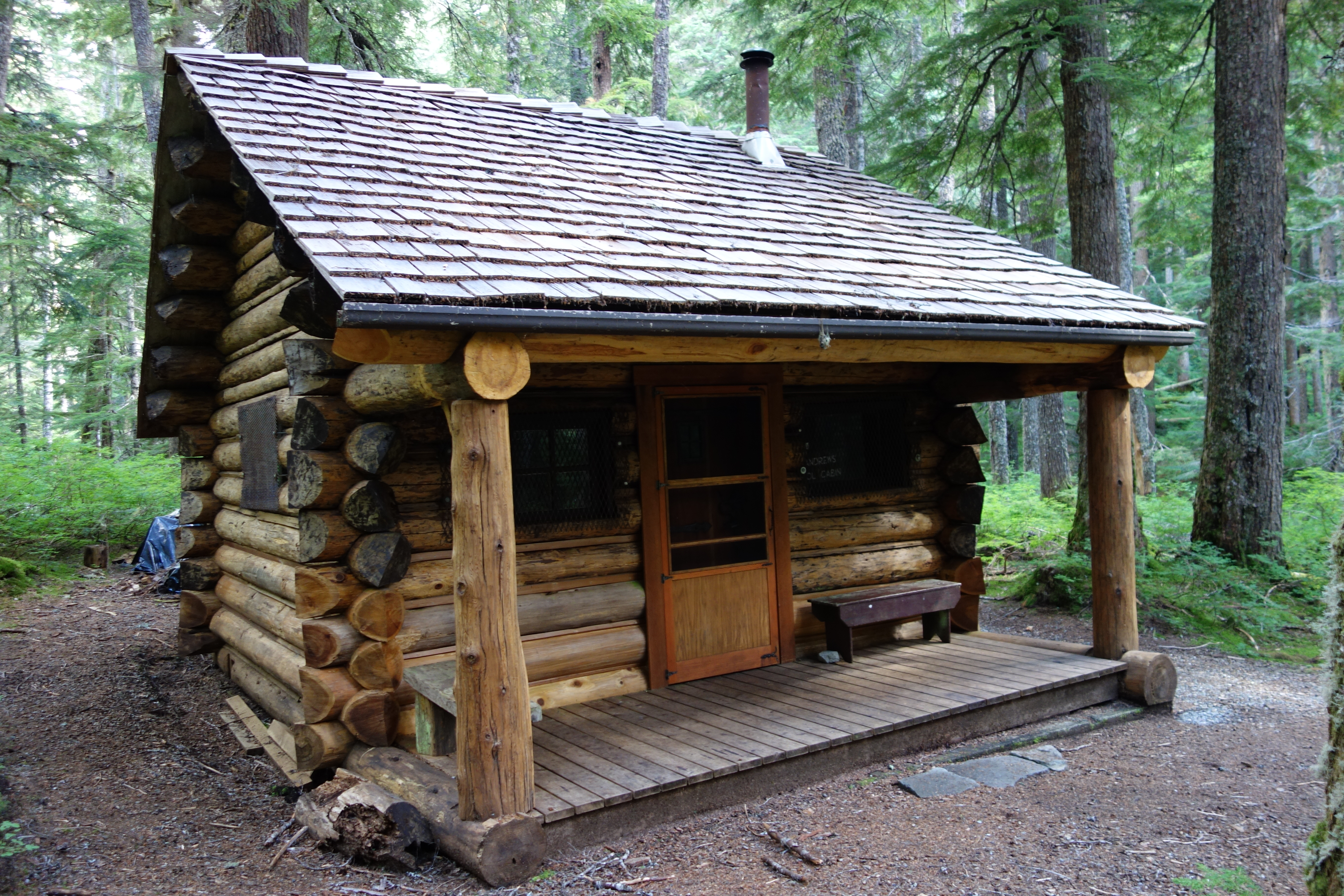

- Location within Washington (state)
- Nearest city: Nisqually Entrance, Washington
- Coordinates: 46°50′10″N 121°54′10″W
- Area: less than one acre
- Built: 1922
- Architectural style: Rustic style
- MPS: Mt. Rainier National Park MPS
- NRHP reference No.: 91000188
- Added to NRHP: March 13, 1991

The St. Andrews Patrol Cabin was built by the National Park Service in 1922 as part of a network of stations near the boundaries of Mount Rainier National Park for rangers on patrol. The one-room log structure stands along St. Andrews Creek and St. Andrews Creek Trail near the Westside Road and the western boundary of the national park. The exterior of the cabin features a porch to the front. The interior is finished with varnished logs and tongue and groove flooring. The cabin was placed on the National Register of Historic Places on March 13, 1991. It is part of the Mount Rainier National Historic Landmark District, which encompasses the entire park and which recognizes the park's inventory of Park Service-designed rustic architecture.
