= Sydney Falls =

Waterfall in Washington (state), United States

Coordinates: 46°50′25″N 121°33′32″W

- Interactive map of Sydney Falls
- Location: Mount Rainier National Park, Pierce County, Washington, United States
- Type: Tiered
- Total height: 200 feet (61 m)
- Number of drops: 2
- Total width: 75 feet (23 m)
- Watercourse: Kotsuck Creek

Sydney Falls, more commonly called Kotsuck Creek Falls or Kotsuck Falls, is a waterfall in the Mount Rainier National Park in the U.S. state of Washington.

The falls is formed as Kotsuck Creek, a tributary of the Cowlitz River, thunders 200 feet (61 m) into a steep and rugged canyon in a plume 75 feet (23 m) wide. The falls start with a small tier of 30 feet (9.1 m), then splits into three streams and plunges over a sheer cliff face, joining at the bottom.

The name of the falls comes from a 1912 article that mentions that "Sydney Falls is along the Wonderland Trail". The name "Kotsuck" comes from a Chinook Indian word meaning "middle". However, the name "Kotsuck Creek Falls" may be inaccurate, as the names of Kotsuck Creek and Chinook Creek may have been switched at some time in the past.
