= White River Entrance =

- U.S. National Register of Historic Places
- U.S. Historic district
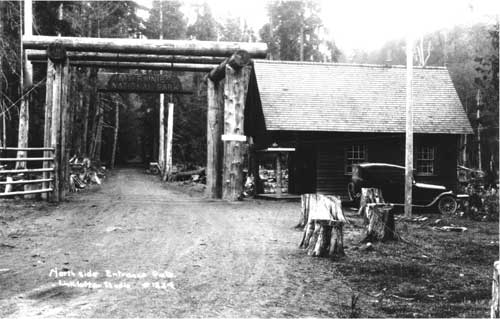

- Location within Washington (state)
- Location: White River Entrance, Mount Rainier National Park, Washington
- Coordinates: 46°54′8″N 121°33′14″W
- Area: 4.9 acres (2.0 ha)
- Architectural style: Rustic style
- MPS: Mt. Rainier National Park MPS
- NRHP reference No.: 91000177
- Added to NRHP: March 13, 1991

The White River Entrance to Mount Rainier National Park is a complex of buildings built between 1929 and 1931 to accommodate visitors arriving on the Yakima Park Highway, in the northeastern portion of the park. Like most of the structures in Mount Rainier, the buildings are designed in the National Park Service Rustic style, using natural stone and log materials. The historic district includes the 1933 Men's Mess Hall and Dormitory, believed to be the only surviving camp structure built by the Civilian Conservation Corps in the park.

The Ranger and Checking Station was built starting in 1929. Access was difficult, since Yakima Park Highway construction had not yet reached the area. Work was not entirely completed until 1931. Design was by the National Park Service Branch of Plans and Design, under the supervision of Thomas Chalmers Vint. The station is a one-story T-shaped log structure of seven rooms, with a porte-cochere extending over the road. It follows the prototype of the Nisqually Entrance Station, although the Nisqually station was remodeled to incorporate the porte-cochere first used at White River. The building provided living and working quarters for a ranger, with two bedrooms, a dining room, kitchen bathroom and living room.

Men's and women's "comfort stations," or public toilets, were built nearby in 1931 in a similar style. The district was listed on the National Register of Historic Places on March 13, 1991. It is part of the Mount Rainier National Historic Landmark District, which encompasses the entire park and which recognizes the park's inventory of Park Service-designed rustic architecture.
