= St. Andrews Creek Bridge =

- U.S. National Register of Historic Places
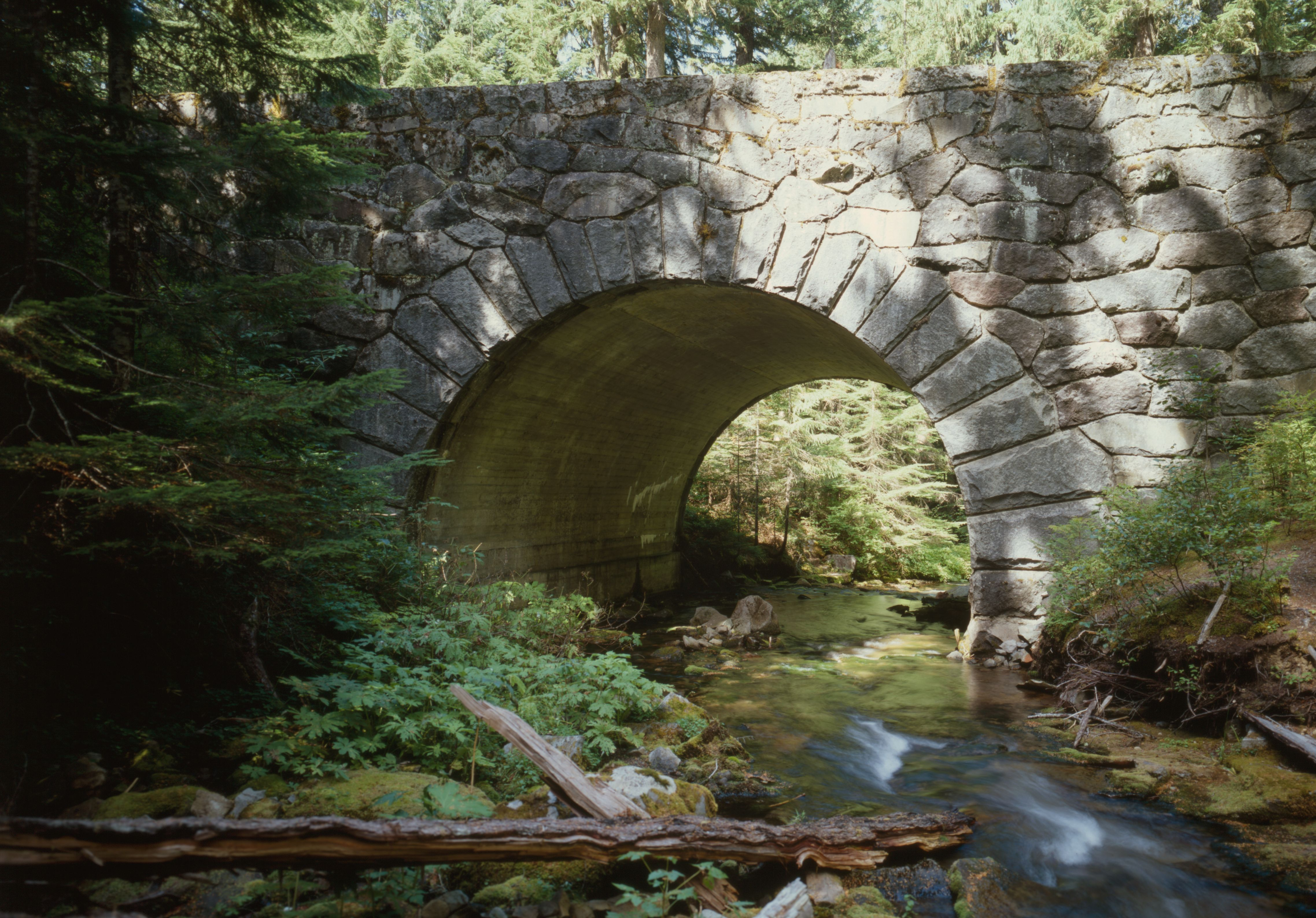

- Location within Washington (state)
- Nearest city: Nisqually Entrance, Washington
- Coordinates: 46°50′07″N 121°54′21″W
- Area: less than one acre
- Built: 1931
- Architectural style: Rustic style
- MPS: Mount Rainier National Park MPS
- NRHP reference No.: 91000199
- Added to NRHP: March 13, 1991

The St. Andrews Creek Bridge was built in 1930-31 as part of the West Side Road in Mount Rainier National Park. The bridge spans 26 feet (7.9 m) and is almost 34 feet (10 m) wide, carrying a two-lane road on a stone-faced concrete bridge. The West Side Road was planned to link the Nisqually and Carbon River entrances to the park, but only 13 miles (21 km) were completed in six years.

The bridge was placed on the National Register of Historic Places on March 13, 1991. It is part of the Mount Rainier National Historic Landmark District, which encompasses the entire park, and which recognizes the park's inventory of Park Service-designed rustic architecture.

== See also ==
- List of bridges documented by the Historic American Engineering Record in Washington (state)
