= Ipsut Creek Patrol Cabin =

United States historic place

- U.S. National Register of Historic Places
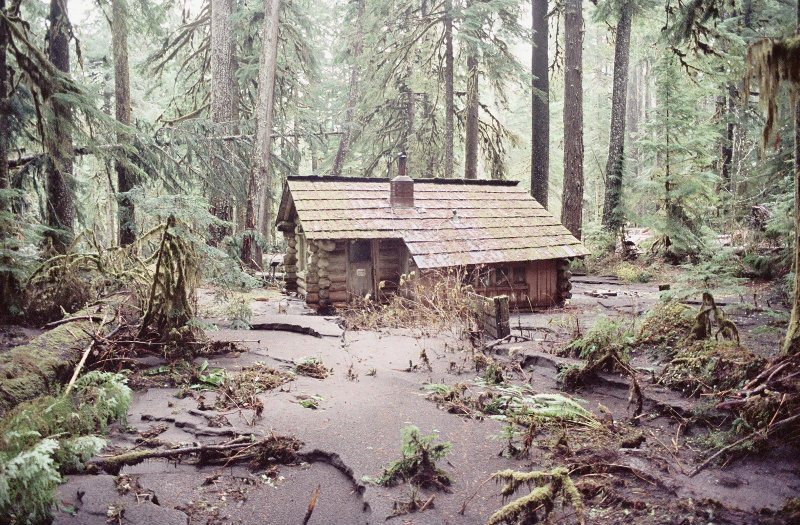
- Ipsut Creek Patrol Cabin following the flood of 2006

- Location within Washington (state) Location within the United States
- Nearest city: Carbon River Entrance, Washington
- Coordinates: 46°58′40″N 121°49′54″W
- Area: less than one acre
- Built: 1933
- Architectural style: Rustic style
- MPS: Mt. Rainier National Park MPS
- NRHP reference No.: 91000181
- Added to NRHP: March 13, 1991

The Ipsut Creek Patrol Cabin was built by the United States National Park Service in 1933 in Mount Rainier National Park to house backcountry rangers. The log cabin resembles other cabins at Huckleberry Creek, Lake James and Three Lakes, all built to standard plans from the Park Service Branch of Plans and Designs, supervised by Acting Chief Architect W. G. Carnes. The cabin is approximately 24 feet (7.3 m) by 14 feet (4.3 m), with a lean-to storage shed to the rear.

The cabin was added to the National Register of Historic Places on March 13, 1991. It is part of the Mount Rainier National Historic Landmark District, which encompasses the entire park and which recognizes the park's inventory of Park Service-designed rustic architecture.
