= Lake George Patrol Cabin =

- U.S. National Register of Historic Places
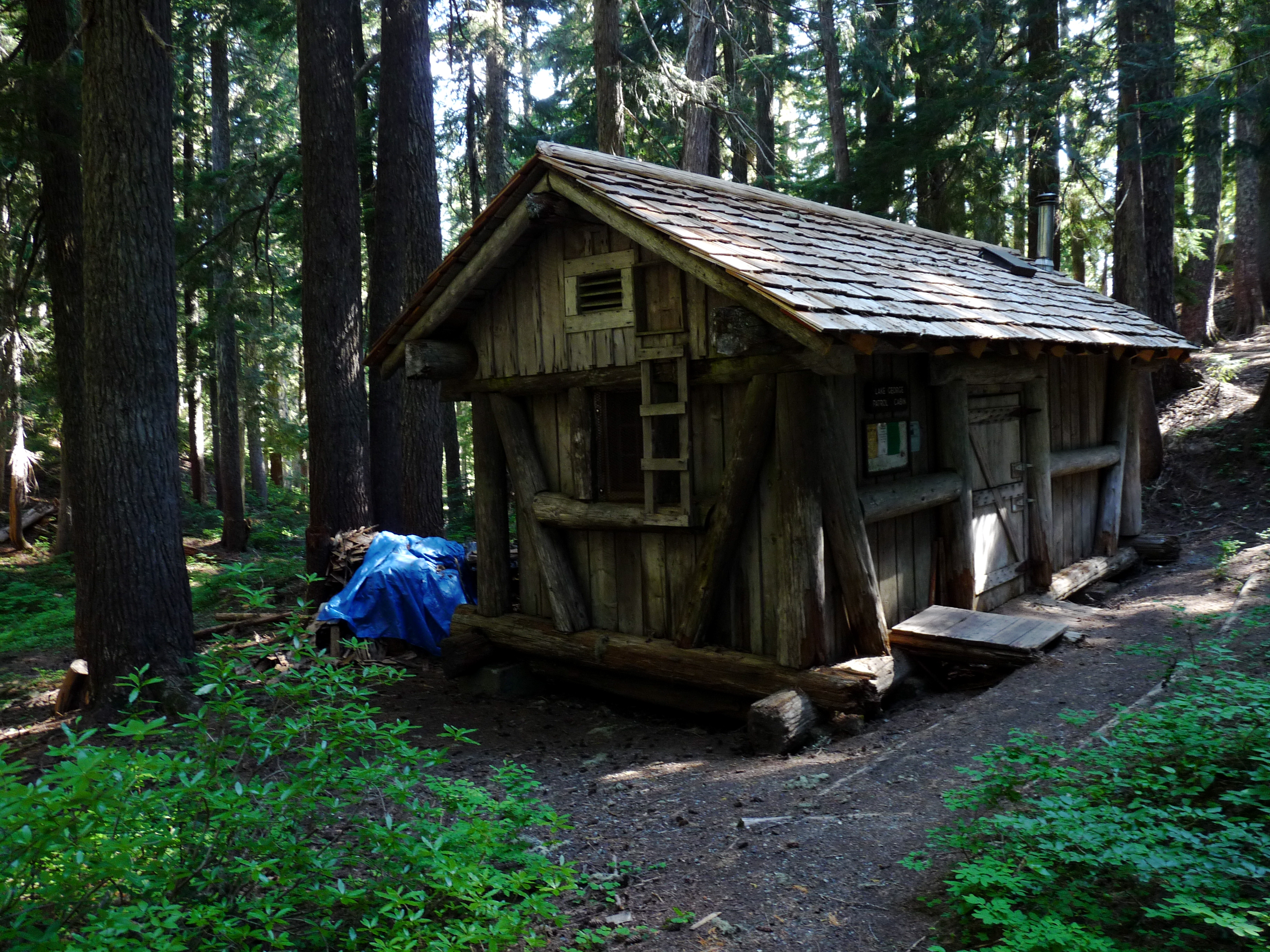

- Location within Washington (state)
- Nearest city: Longmire, Washington
- Coordinates: 46°47′36″N 121°54′7″W
- Area: less than one acre
- Built: 1921
- Architectural style: Rustic style
- MPS: Mt. Rainier National Park MPS
- NRHP reference No.: 91000182
- Added to NRHP: March 13, 1991

The Lake George Patrol Cabin was built in 1934 by the National Park Service in Mount Rainier National Park as a backcountry patrol station and hiker's shelter. The single-story wood-frame building measures about 26.5 feet (8.1 m) by 12 feet (3.7 m). Initially intended as a horse barn, it was converted for ranger accommodation, replacing a 1921 structure. The first cabin survived until 1969, when it was destroyed by a falling tree.

The cabin was listed on the National Register of Historic Places on March 13, 1991. It is part of the Mount Rainier National Historic Landmark District, which encompasses the entire park and which recognizes the park's inventory of Park Service-designed rustic architecture.
