= Edith Creek Chlorination House =

- U.S. National Register of Historic Places
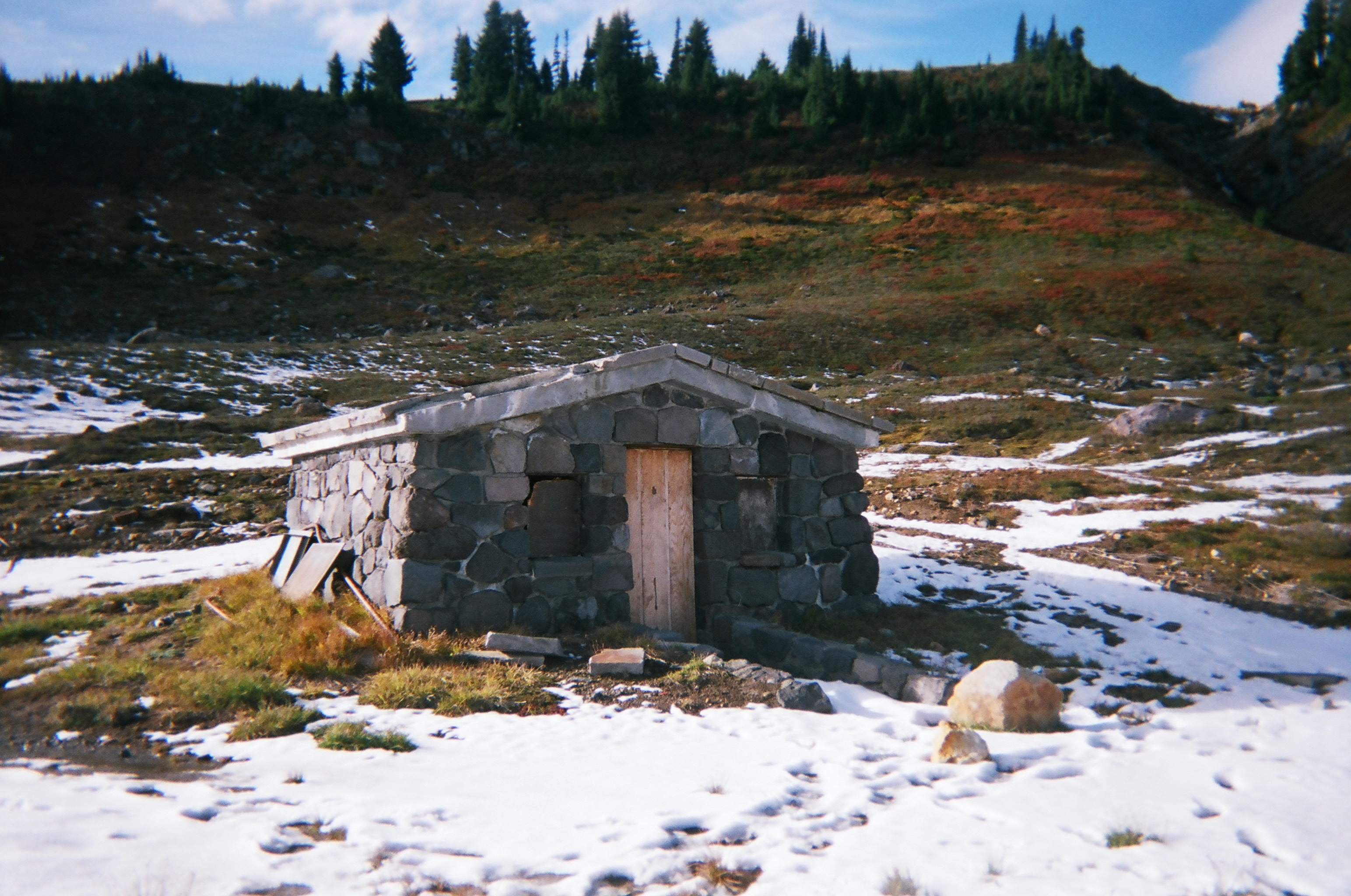

- Location within Washington (state)
- Nearest city: Paradise, Washington
- Coordinates: 46°47′38″N 121°43′54″W
- Area: less than one acre
- Built: 1930
- Architectural style: Rustic style
- MPS: Mt. Rainier National Park MPS
- NRHP reference No.: 91000201
- Added to NRHP: March 13, 1991

The Edith Creek Chlorination House is a historic structure in Mount Rainier National Park, built by the National Park Service in 1930. The rustic structure was built as part of the water supply system to the Paradise area. The low concrete building with stone veneer cladding was built to withstand very heavy snow loads. It was fed by a small dam on Edith Creek, which was replaced in 1970. The chlorination house contained equipment to chlorinate the water from this source and to regulate the level of the reservoir.

The Edith Creek Chlorination House was placed on the National Register of Historic Places on March 13, 1991. It is part of the Mount Rainier National Historic Landmark District, which encompasses the entire park and which recognizes the park's inventory of Park Service-designed rustic architecture.
