= Indian Henry's Patrol Cabin =

- U.S. National Register of Historic Places
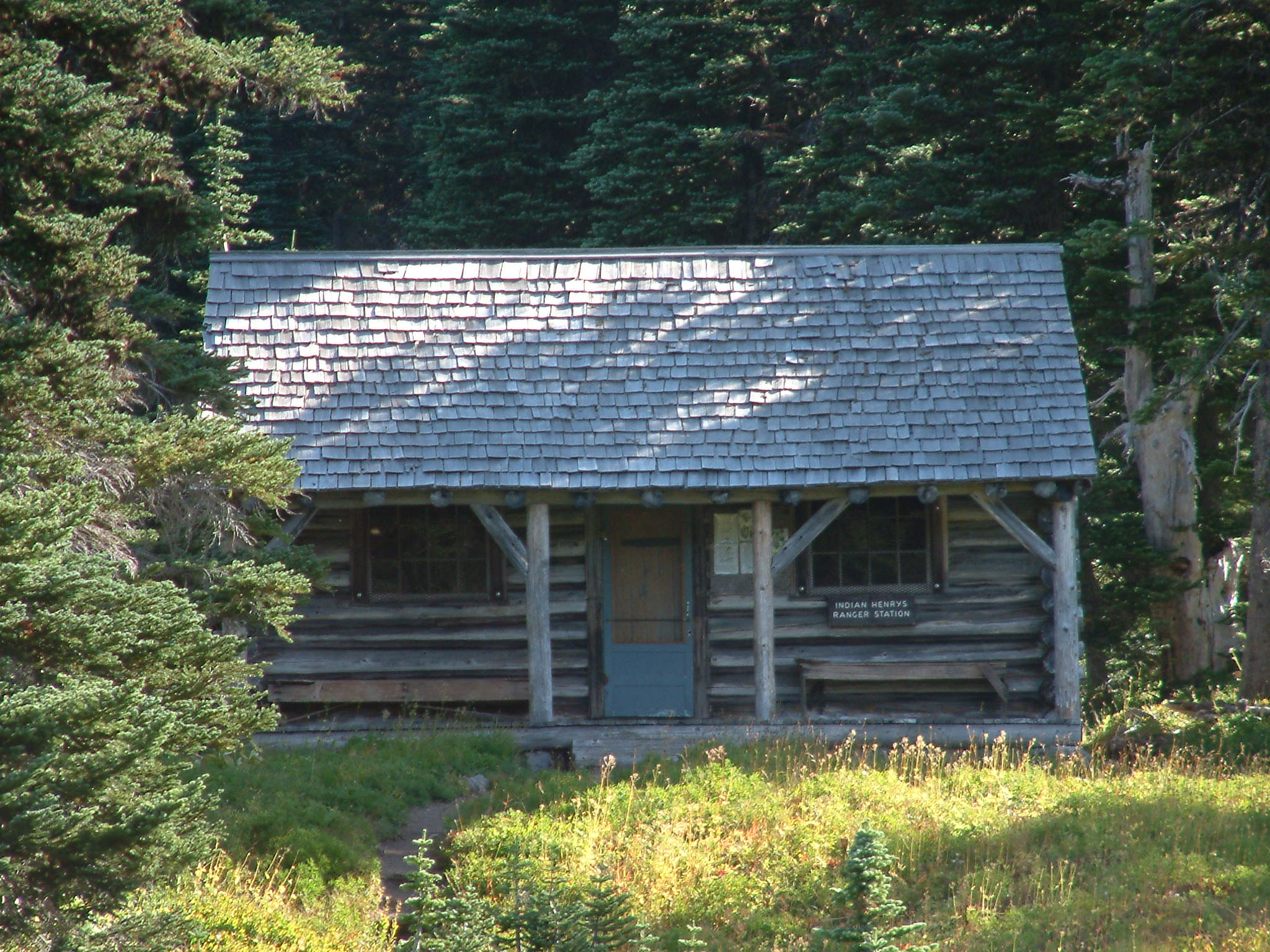

- Location within Washington (state) Location within the United States
- Nearest city: Longmire, Washington
- Coordinates: 46°47′39″N 121°50′20″W
- Area: less than one acre
- Built: 1916
- Architectural style: Rustic style
- MPS: Mt. Rainier National Park MPS
- NRHP reference No.: 91000180
- Added to NRHP: March 13, 1991

Indian Henry's Patrol Cabin is an early National Park Service patrol cabin in Mount Rainier National Park. The cabin was built in 1915–1916 at an elevation of 5,300 feet (1,600 m) in an area of the park known as "Indian Henry's Hunting Ground," which had been used in the 19th century by the Cowlitz and Nisqually tribes. "Indian Henry" was an Indian guide who accompanied James Longmire in his explorations of the area. The Indian Henry's area became a tourist destination with the 1908 establishment of the "Wigwam Camp," a tent camp which was abandoned in 1918. The area remained as a headquarters for backcountry patrols; the cabin was the first such facility in the park.

The cabin is a one-story log structure with a broad front porch. The cabin measures 25 feet (7.6 m) by 15.5 feet (4.7 m). It was placed on the National Register of Historic Places on March 13, 1991. It is part of the Mount Rainier National Historic Landmark District, which encompasses the entire park and which recognizes the park's inventory of Park Service-designed rustic architecture.
