= Bibliography of Mount Rainier National Park =

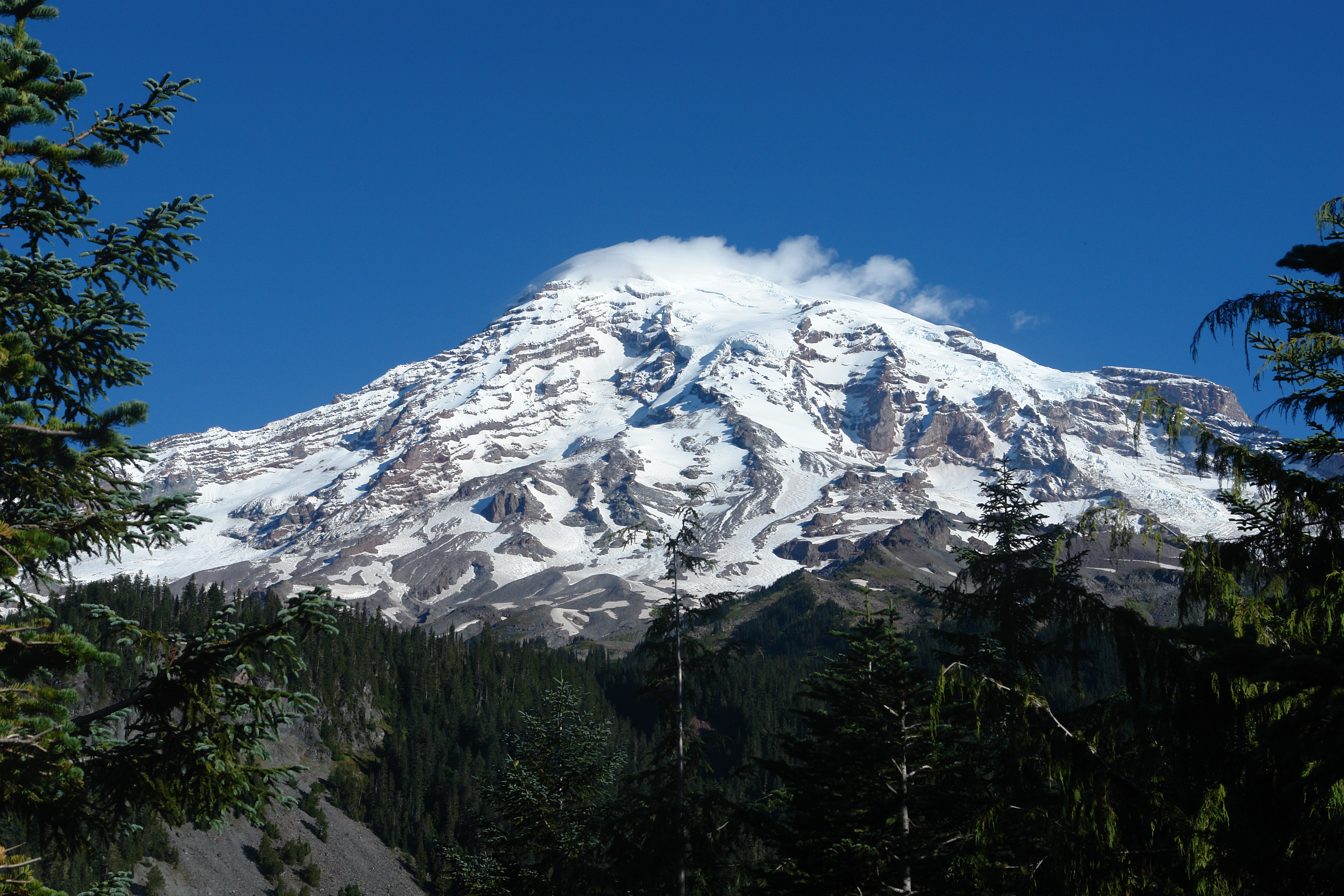
Mount Rainier

The List of Mount Rainier National Park references identifies English language historic, scientific, ecological, cultural, tourism, social, and advocacy books, journals and studies on the subject of Mount Rainier National Park topics published since 1899 and documented in Mount Rainier related bibliographies and other related references.

== History ==
- James Wickersham (February 1893). "Is it Mount Tacoma, or Rainier?" (PDF). Proceedings of the Tacoma Academy of Sciences, Tacoma, Wa. Tacoma Academy of Sciences.
- Edmond S. Meany, ed. (1916). Mount Rainier: A Record of Exploration (PDF). New York: The Macmillan Company.
- Hartman, J. P. (1935). Creation of Mount Rainier National Park.
- Robert N. McIntrye (1952). Short History of Mount Rainier National Park (PDF). National Park Service. Archived from the original (PDF) on July 3, 2007.
- A. D. Martinson (1986). Wilderness above the sound: The story of Mount Rainier National Park (Western Horizons Book). Northland Press. ISBN 9780873583985.
- Haines, Aubrey L. (1962). Mountain fever, historic conquests of Rainier. Portland, OR: Oregon Historical Society.
- H. E. Rensch (1935). Mount Rainier, Its Human History Associations. National Park Service. Archived from the original on July 3, 2007.
- Greg C. Burtchard (1998). Environment, Prehistory & Archaeology of Mount Rainier National Park, Washington. National Park Service. Archived from the original on August 31, 2009.
- Ruth Kirk (1999). Sunrise to Paradise: The Story of Mount Rainier National Park. University of Washington Press. ISBN 9780295977713.

== Park management ==
- Stagner, Howard Ralph (1947). Behind the scenery of Mount Rainier National Park. Longmire, WA: Mount Rainier National Park Natural History Association.
- Mount Rainier National Park, Washington Preliminary Master Plan. National Park Service. 1973. Archived from the original on July 13, 2007.
- Shader, Nancy; Coen, Reid (1998). Finding Aid-Records of Mount Rainier National Park (PDF) (Report). National Park Service.

== Wildlife ==
- F. E. Matthes (1922). Features of the Flora of Mount Rainier National Park. National Park Service. Archived from the original on July 13, 2007.
- G. F. Allen (1922). Forests of Mount Rainier National Park. National Park Service. Archived from the original on July 3, 2007.
- Taylor, Walter P.; William T. Shaw (1927). Mammals and Birds of Mount Rainier National Park (PDF). National Park Service.
- C. Frank Brockman (1941). Flora of Mount Rainier National Park (PDF). National Park Service.
- Jerry F. Franklin; William H. Moir; Miles A. Hemstrom; Sarah E. Greene; Bradley G. Smith (1988). The Forest Communities of Mount Rainier National Park. National Park Service. Archived from the original on November 2, 2007.
- Ronald A. Nussbaum; Edmund D. Brodie (1983). Amphibians and Reptiles of the Pacific Northwest. Idaho Research Foundation. ISBN 9780893010867.
- Lawrence L. C. Jones; William P. Leonard; Deanna H. Olson, eds. (2005). Amphibians of the Pacific Northwest. Seattle Audubon Society. ISBN 9780914516163.
- Corkran, Charlotte C.; Thoms, Chris (2006). Amphibians of Oregon, Washington, and British Columbia. Lone Pine Publishing. ISBN 9781551055664.

== Geology and geography ==
- F. E. Matthes (1928). Mount Rainier and Its Glaciers. National Park Service. Archived from the original on July 15, 2007.
- Crandell, Dwight (1969). Surficial Geology of Mount Rainier National Park, Washington (PDF). U.S. Geological Survey.
- Crandell, Dwight (1983). The Geologic Story of Mount Rainier. Pacific Northwest National Parks & forests Association.
- Ferguson, Sue A. (1992). Glaciers of North America: A Field Guide. Fulcrum Publishing.

== Historic structures ==
- Eastman, Leslie W. (1951). Appraisal of Rainier National Park Company and Inventory Mt. Rainier National Park, Washington. National Park Service.
- Snow, David E. (1979). Historic Structure Report: Paradise Inn, Mount Rainier National Park, Washington. National Park Service.
- Thompson, Erwin N. (1981). Mount Rainier National Park, Washington: Historic Resource Study. National Park Service.

== Tourism and recreation ==
- F. W. Schmoe (1925). Our Greatest Mountain-A Handbook For Mt Rainier National Park. Putnam.
- Driedger, Carolyn (1986). A Visitors Guide to the Mt. Rainier Glacier. Longmire, WA: Pacific Northwest National Parks and Forests Association.
- Ira Spring; Harvey Manning (1988). 50 Hikes in Mount Rainier National Park. Mountaineers Books. ISBN 9780898861754.
- Jeffery L. Smoot (1991). Adventure Guide to Mount Rainier: Hiking, Climbing and Skiing in Mt. Rainier National Park. ISBN 9780934641401.
- Jerry Rohde; Gisela Rohde (1994). Mount Rainier National Park: Tales, Trails, & Auto Tours. ISBN 9780964026117.
- Bette Filley (1998). Discovering the Wonders of the Wonderland Trail: Encircling Mount Rainier. Dunamis House. ISBN 9781880405086.
- Sharlene Nelson; Ted Nelson (1998). Mount Rainier National Park (True Books: National Parks). Scholastic Library Publishing. ISBN 9780516206240.
- George Wuerthner; Douglas W. Moore (2000). Mount Rainier A Visitor's Companion. Stackpole Books. ISBN 9780811728560.
- Heidi Schneider (2005). Best Easy Day Hikes Mount Rainier National Park, 2nd (Best Easy Day Hikes Series). Falcon Guides. ISBN 9780762736270.
- Dan Nelson (2008). Day Hiking Mount Rainier: National Park Trails. Mountaineers Books. ISBN 9781594850608.
- Mount Rainier National Park, WA - #217 (National Geographic Maps: Trails Illustrated) (Map). National Geographic Society. 2009. ISBN 9781566953450.
- Tami Asars (2012). Hiking the Wonderland Trail: The Complete Guide to Mount Rainier's Premier Trail. Mountaineers Books. ISBN 9781594856549.
- Doug Lorain (2012). One Best Hike: Mount Rainier's Wonderland Trail. Wilderness Press. ISBN 9780899976556.

=== Mountaineering ===
- Fred Beckey; George Sainsbury (1961). Climber's Guide to the Cascade and Olympic Mountains of Washington. American Alpine Club.
- Dee Molenaar (1979). The Challenge of Rainier: A Record of the Explorations and Ascents, Triumphs and Tragedies, on the Northwest's Greatest Mountain. Mountaineers Books. ISBN 9780916890704.

== Photography ==
- Samuel Wilson (1909). Scenic Wonders from the Mt Rainier National Park, Washington-The Wonderland of the Cascades. General Freight and Passenger Department Tacoma Eastern Railroad Company, Tacoma, WA.
- Tim McNulty; Pat O'Hara (1998). Washington's Mount Rainier National Park: A Centennial Celebration. Mountaineers Books. ISBN 9780898865820.
- Charles Gurche; Bob McIntyre (2003). Mount Rainier National Park Impressions. Farcountry Press. ISBN 9781560372400.
