= Wonderland Trail Shelters =

- U.S. National Register of Historic Places
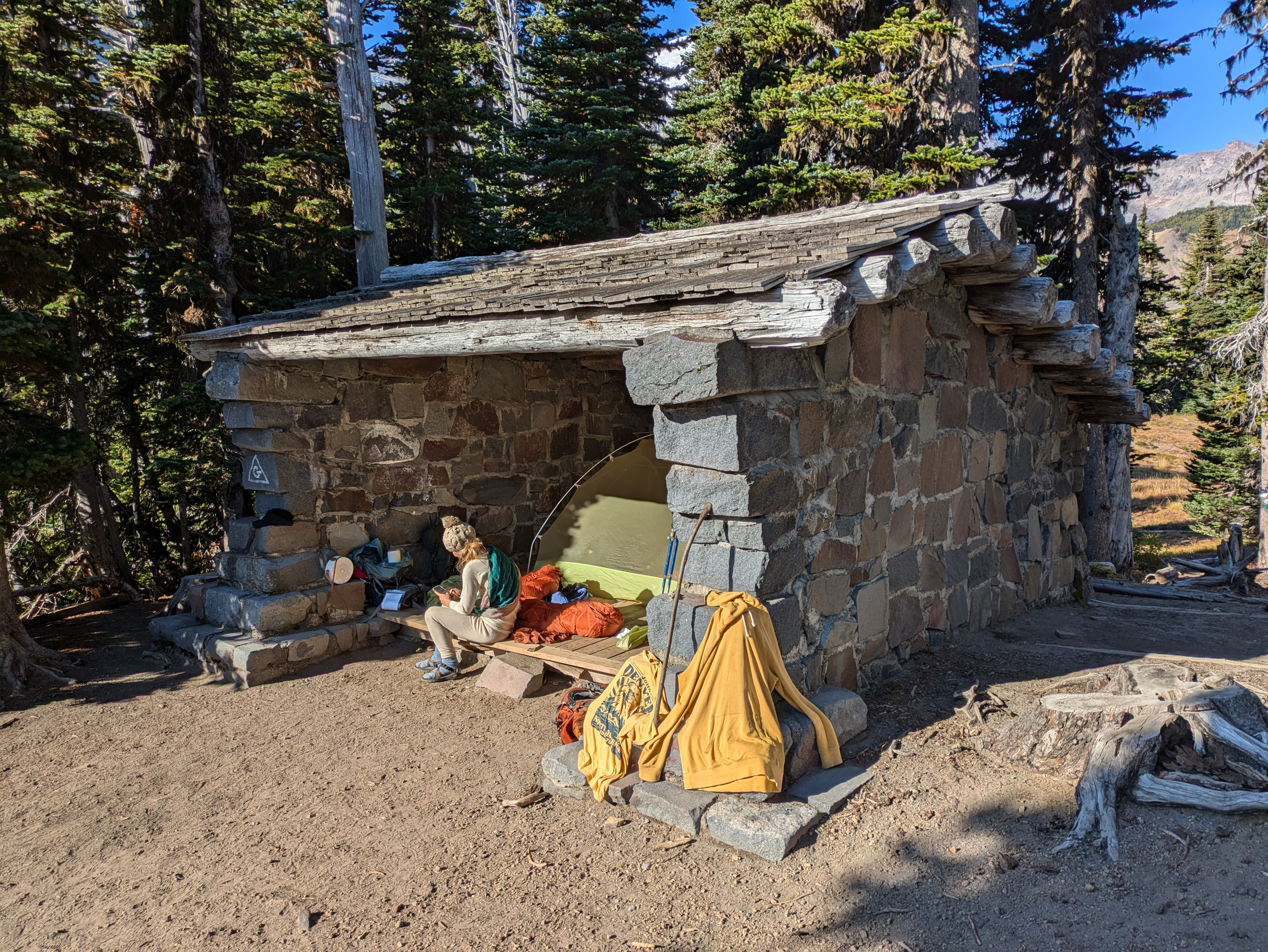
- The Summerland shelter occupied by backpackers, 13 October 2024

- Location within Washington (state)
- Area: less than one acre
- Built: 1934
- Architectural style: Rustic style
- MPS: Mt. Rainier National Park MPS
- NRHP reference No.: 91000185
- Added to NRHP: March 13, 1991

The Wonderland Trail is an approximately 93-mile (150 km) hiking trail that circumnavigates Mount Rainier in Mount Rainier National Park, Washington, United States. Built in 1915, it traverses many ridges for 22,000 feet (6,700 m) of cumulative elevation gain.

The shelters are part of the notable rustic architectural theme that is particularly consistent at Mount Rainier in both frontcountry and backcountry, having all been built at the height of the NPS Rustic design trend. Since its founding in 1916, the NPS sought to design and build visitor facilities without visually interrupting the natural or historic surroundings. The shelters are part of the Mount Rainier National Historic Landmark District, which encompasses the entire park and which recognizes the park's inventory of Park Service-designed rustic architecture.

== Built by Civilian Conservation Corps ==
The Summerland Trail Shelter, the Indian Bar Trail Shelter, and North Mowich Trail Shelter are the three CCC shelters remaining on the trail. Both were designed by the National Park Service Branch of Plans and Design, under the supervision of Edwin A. Nickel.

=== Summerland Trail Shelter ===
The Summerland Trail Shelter in Mount Rainier National Park is a rustic shelter on the Wonderland Trail, built by the Civilian Conservation Corps in 1934. The shelter features stone walls and a log roof structure, in a saltbox shape. It Measures about 15 feet (4.6 m) by 16 feet (4.9 m). According to the supervising landscape architect, "The workmen were inexperienced in stone work and the shelter was not too good in appearance, but it was in harmony with its location." The shelter was listed on the National Register of Historic Places on March 13, 1991.

- North Mowich Trail Shelter
- U.S. National Register of Historic Places
- Nearest city: Mowich Lake Entrance, Washington
- Built: 1934
- NRHP reference No.: 91000184
- Added to NRHP: March 13, 1991

=== North Mowich Trail Shelter ===
The North Mowich Trail Shelter is one of a series of shelters designed to provide simple shelter to hikers on the Wonderland Trail in Mount Rainier National Park. The North Mowich shelter was built in 1934 by Civilian Conservation Corps workers. The log structure, open to the front, measures 14 feet (4.3 m) by 14 feet (4.3 m). The shelter was listed on the National Register of Historic Places on March 13, 1991.

- Indian Bar Trail Shelter
- U.S. National Register of Historic Places
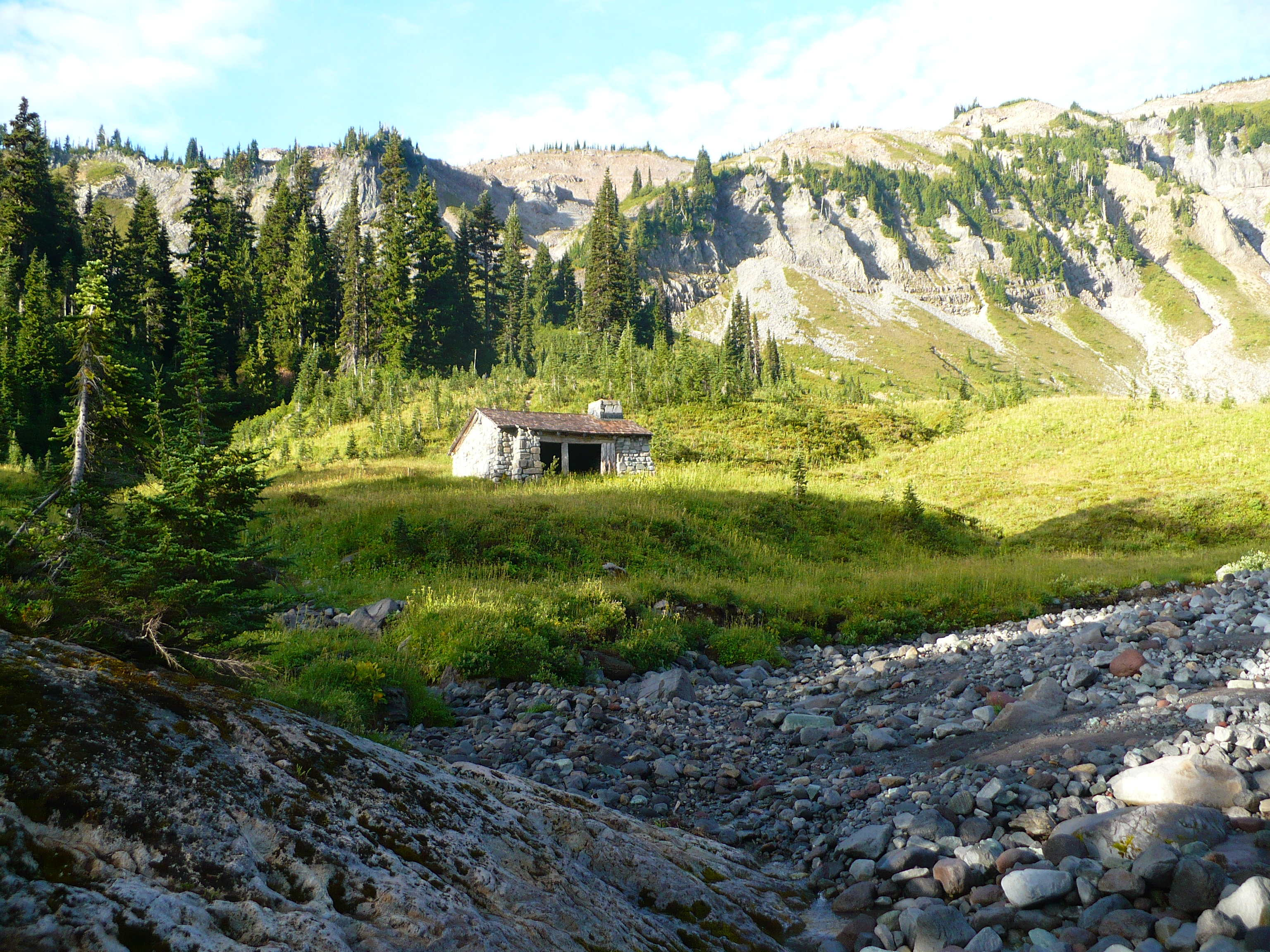
- Indian Bar Trail Shelter
- Built: 1940
- NRHP reference No.: 91000179
- Added to NRHP: March 13, 1991

=== Indian Bar Trail Shelter ===
The Indian Bar Trail Shelter in Mount Rainier National Park is a rustic shelter on the Wonderland Trail, built by the Civilian Conservation Corps in 1940. The shelter features stone walls and a log roof structure, to a design by the National Park Service Branch of Plans and Design, under the supervision of Edwin A. Nickel. Measuring about 23 feet (7.0 m) by 26 feet (7.9 m), it is one of two CCC shelters remaining on the trail, with the earlier Summerland Trail Shelter. The Indian Bar shelter features a stone fireplace, and replaced an earlier ranger-built shelter. The shelter was listed on the National Register of Historic Places on March 13, 1991.

In 2008, renovations were made to the Indian Bar Shelter to make repairs and correct drainage problems. Funding provided by the Mount Rainier National Park Associates was matched under the federal NPS Centennial Project.

== Other historic shelters ==
- Sunset Park Patrol Cabin
- U.S. National Register of Historic Places
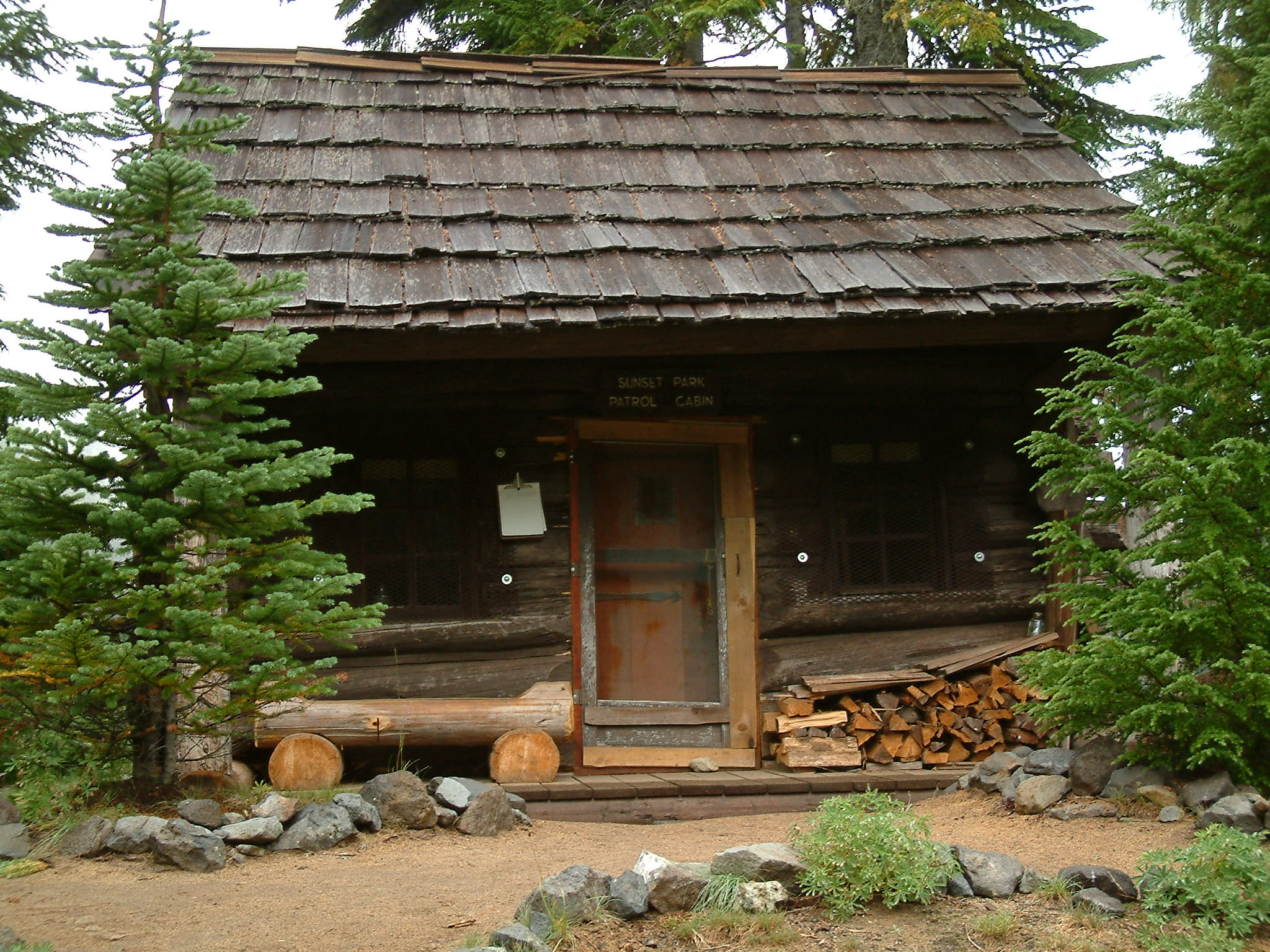
- Nearest city: Mowich Lake Entrance, Washington
- Built: 1922
- NRHP reference No.: 91000186
- Added to NRHP: March 13, 1991

=== Sunset Park Patrol Cabin ===
The Sunset Park Patrol Cabin was built in 1922 to shelter park rangers and hikers on the Wonderland Trail in Mount Rainier National Park. The cabin, at Golden Lakes, is a log structure about 16 feet (4.9 m) by 18 feet (5.5 m) with a low porch (included in the dimensions) across the front. The interior is finished with varnished logs and a wood floor. It was one of several such cabins built in 1922. The cabin was placed on the National Register of Historic Places on March 13, 1991.

=== White River Patrol Cabin ===
- White River Patrol Cabin
- U.S. National Register of Historic Places
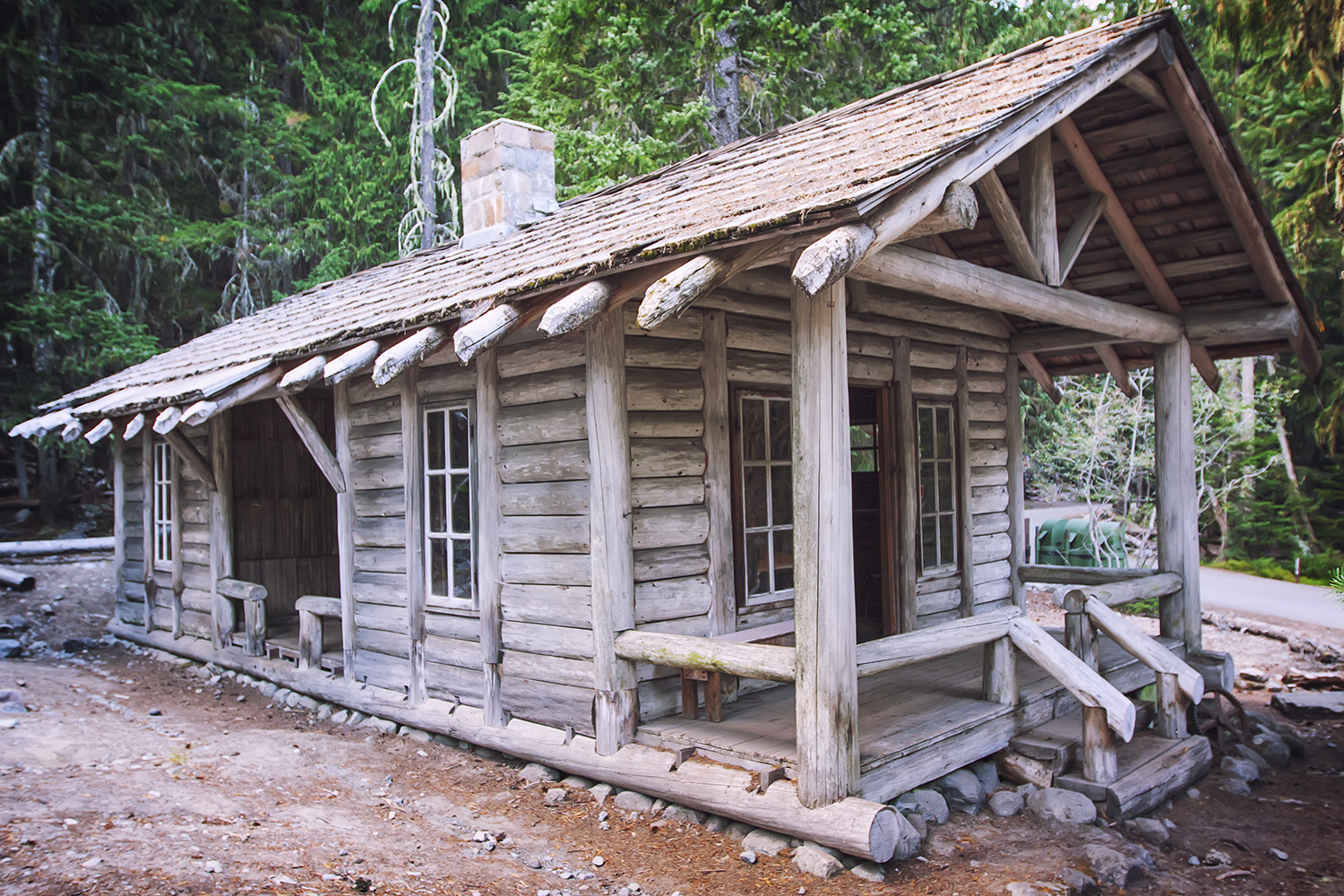
- Nearest city: White River Entrance, Washington
- Built: 1927
- NRHP reference No.: 91000190
- Added to NRHP: March 13, 1991

The White River Patrol Cabin was built in 1927 by the National Park Service at the White River Campground in Mount Rainier National Park, as the White River Campground Ranger Station. The rustic cabin functioned as a patrol cabin because of its location on the Wonderland Trail. Construction is post and beam frame with log roof framing. The three-room cabin was remodeled in 1949. The cabin was placed on the National Register of Historic Places on March 13, 1991.

In 1998 White River Patrol Cabin underwent rehabilitation. This historic back country cabin serves as a mini-museum about the park's extensive trail system, including the Wonderland Trail.

- Sunset Park Trail Shelter
- U.S. National Register of Historic Places
- Built: 1931
- NRHP reference No.: 91000187
- Added to NRHP: March 13, 1991

=== Sunset Park Trail Shelter ===
The Sunset Park Trail Shelter was built in 1931 at Golden Lakes in the Sunset Park portion of Mount Rainier National Park. The rustic log structure provides shelter for hikers on the Wonderland Trail that encircles Mount Rainier. The Sunset Park shelter is built in a saltbox shape, with a porch spanning the width of the front. It was listed on the National Register of Historic Places on March 13, 1991.

== See also ==
- Wonderland Trail
- National Park Service rustic
