= White River Mess Hall and Dormitory =

- U.S. National Register of Historic Places
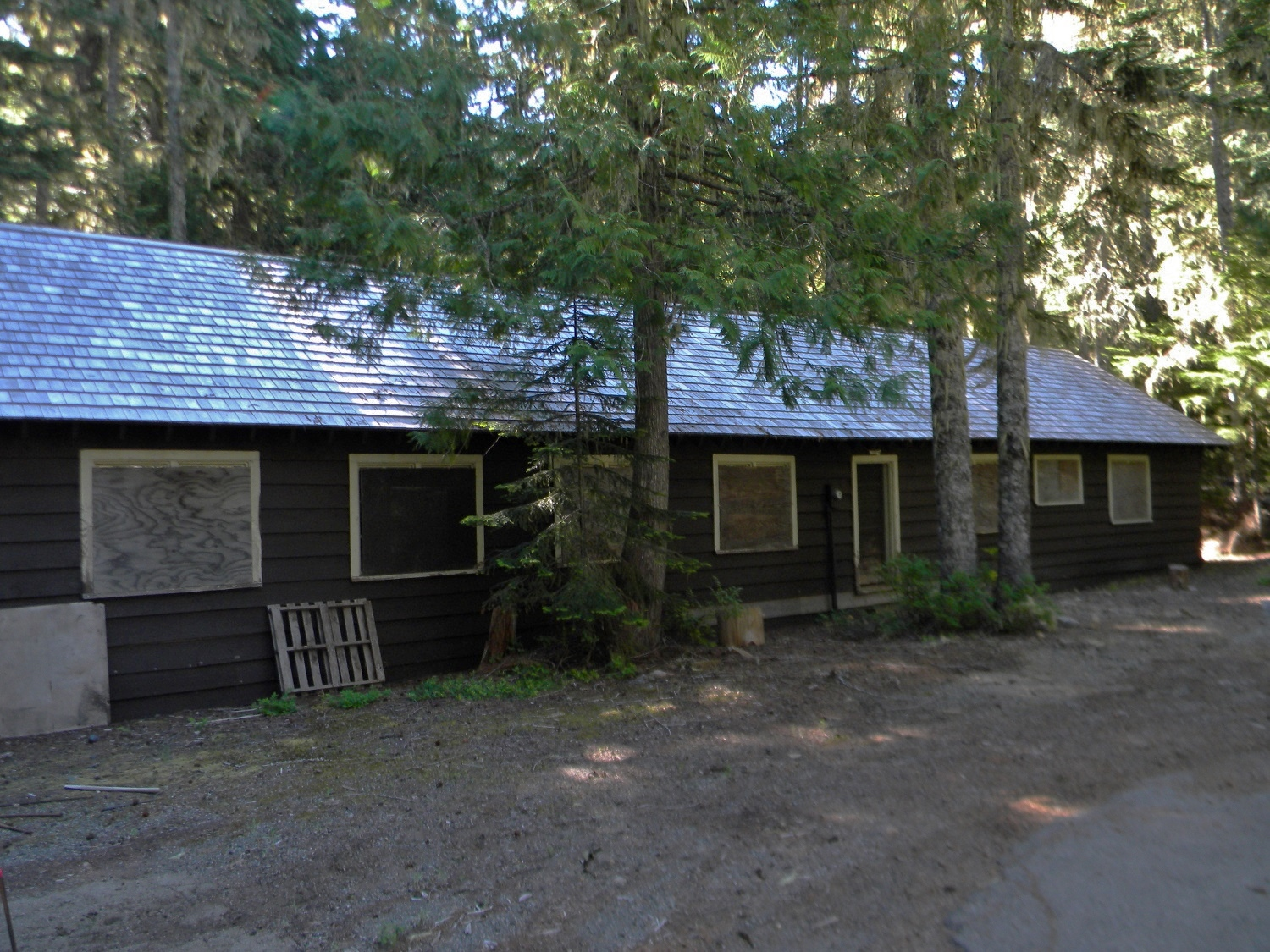

- Location within Washington (state)
- Location: Mt. Rainier National Park, White River Entrance, Washington
- Coordinates: 46°54′8″N 121°33′16″W
- Area: 2,185 square feet (203.0 m^{2})
- Built: 1933
- Architectural style: Rustic style
- MPS: Mt. Rainier National Park MPS
- NRHP reference No.: 91000328
- Added to NRHP: March 13, 1991

The White River Mess Hall and Dormitory is the only remaining Civilian Conservation Corps camp structure remaining in Mount Rainier National Park, Washington, United States. The wood-framed building was built in 1933, and comprising 2,185 square feet (203.0 m^{2}), originally containing a kitchen dining room, living room, two bathrooms, a bedroom and a bunkroom, as well as a service porch. The building no longer serves as a residence and is used for storage. It is located at the White River entrance to the park, part of a complex of service buildings.

The mess hall was listed on the National Register of Historic Places on March 13, 1991. It is included in the White River Entrance Historic District. It is part of the Mount Rainier National Historic Landmark District, which encompasses the entire park and which recognizes the park's inventory of Park Service-designed rustic architecture.
