= Mowich Lake Patrol Cabin =

- U.S. National Register of Historic Places
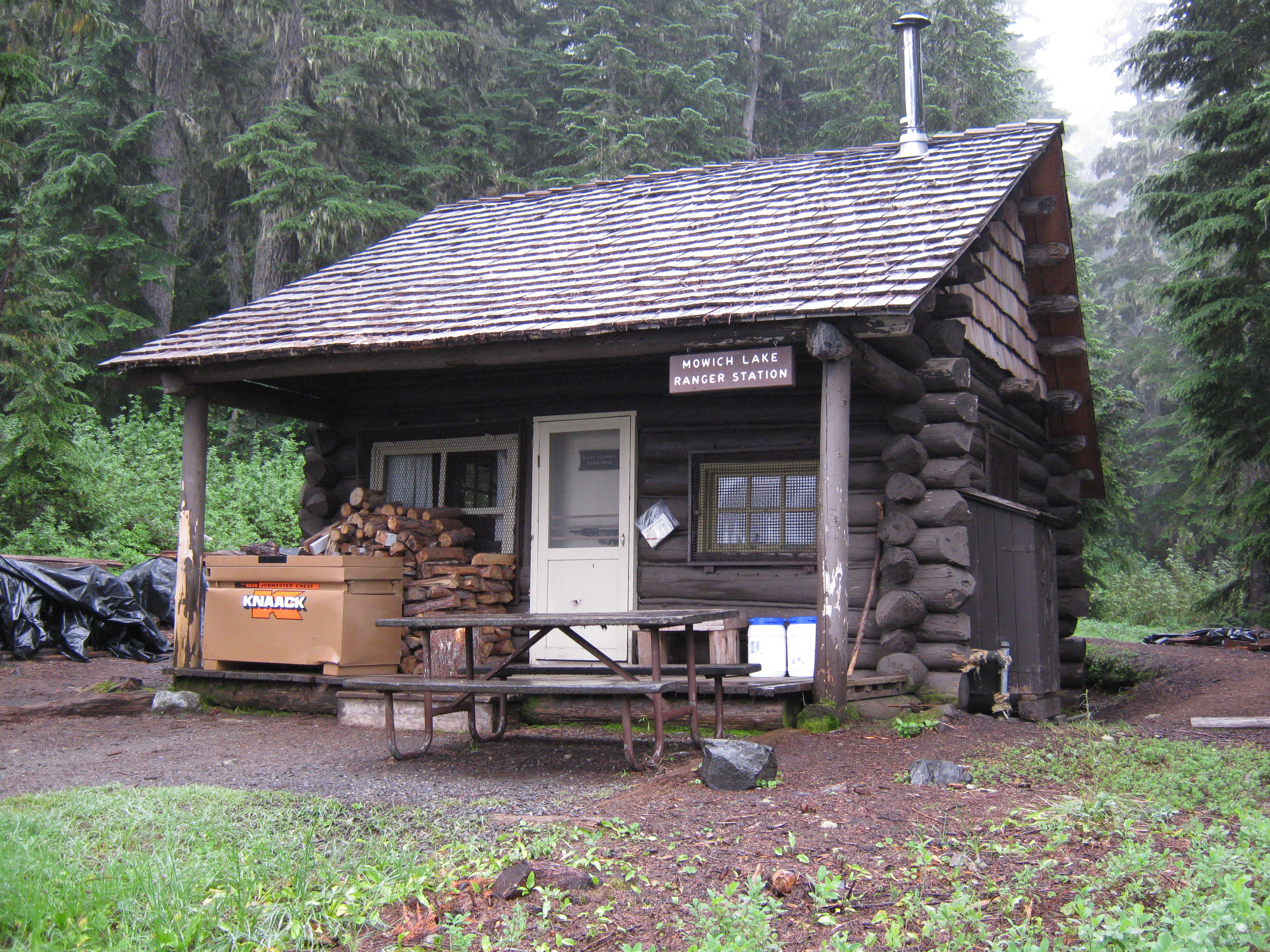

- Location within Washington (state)
- Nearest city: Carbonado, Washington
- Coordinates: 46°56′5″N 121°51′40″W
- Area: less than one acre
- Built: 1922
- Architectural style: Rustic style
- MPS: Mt. Rainier National Park MPS
- NRHP reference No.: 91000183
- Added to NRHP: March 13, 1991

The Mowich Lake Patrol Cabin is one of the oldest backcountry ranger stations in Mount Rainier National Park. Built in 1922, it is located in the western portion of the park and is adjacent to the largest lake in the park. It was used by rangers on boundary patrol, and is located on the Wonderland Trail. The log cabin encloses a 15.5-foot (4.7 m) by 17.5-foot (5.3 m) area, with porch projecting 5.75 feet (1.75 m) to the front. The design was influential in the development of patrol cabin designs in the 1930s. The original foundation logs were replaced in 1974 by a crew of high school age volunteers of the Student Conservation Association.

The cabin serves as a cache point for hikers on the Wonderland Trail.

The cabin was added to the National Register of Historic Places on March 13, 1991. It is part of the Mount Rainier National Historic Landmark District, which encompasses the entire park and which recognizes the park's inventory of Park Service-designed rustic architecture.
