= Shriner Peak Fire Lookout =

- U.S. National Register of Historic Places
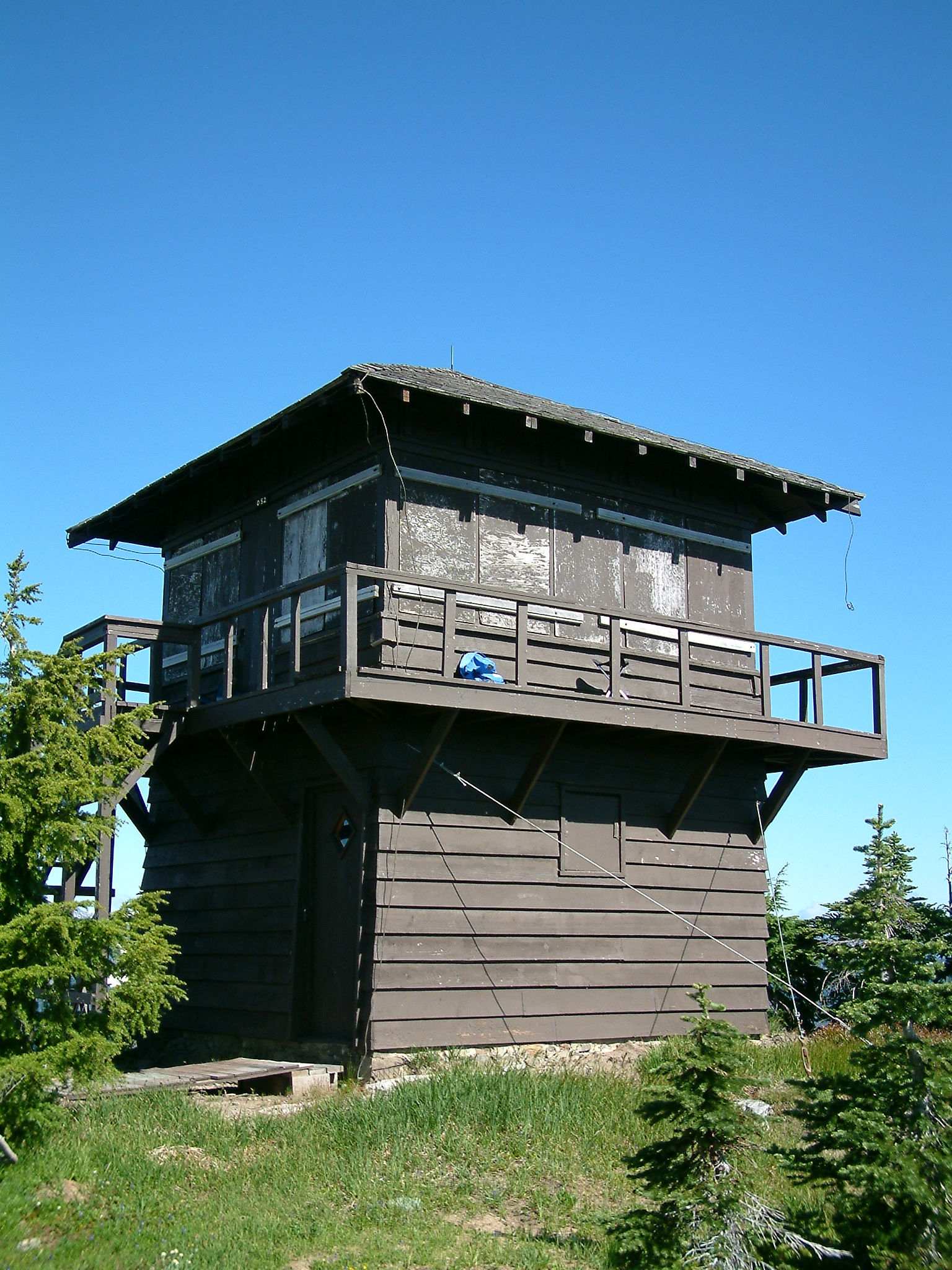

- Location within Washington (state) Location within the United States
- Nearest city: Ohanapecosh, Washington
- Coordinates: 46°48′50″N 121°31′46″W
- Area: less than one acre
- Built: 1932
- Architectural style: Rustic style
- MPS: Mt. Rainier National Park MPS
- NRHP reference No.: 91000194
- Added to NRHP: March 13, 1991

The Shriner Peak Fire Lookout is a fire lookout tower in Mount Rainier National Park. Built in 1932 to a standard design by the National Park Service Branch of Plans and Designs, the wood-frame lookout features a ground-floor storage room and an upper-level lookout and living space with windows on all four sides. A balcony extended around the perimeter of the upper level. The Shriner Peak Lookout is one of four surviving lookout stations in the park.

The lookout was placed on the National Register of Historic Places on March 13, 1991. It is part of the Mount Rainier National Historic Landmark District, which encompasses the entire park and which recognizes the park's inventory of Park Service-designed rustic architecture.
