= Glacier View Wilderness =

Wilderness area in Washington, United States

- IUCN category Ib (wilderness area)
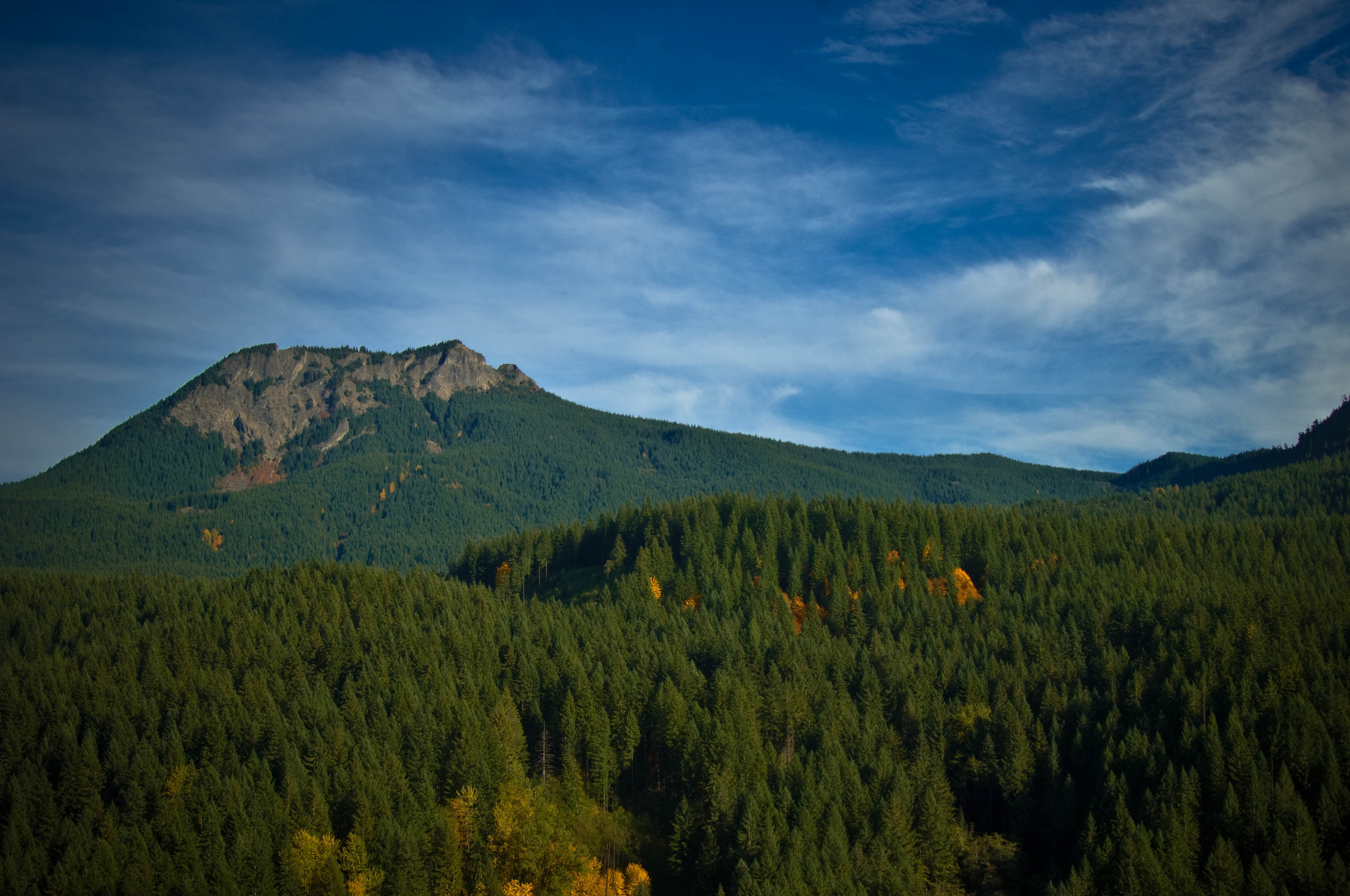

- Location within the United States
- Location: Pierce County, Washington, USA
- Nearest city: Eatonville, WA
- Coordinates: 46°47′52″N 121°55′50″W
- Area: 3,073 acres (1,244 ha)
- Established: 1984
- Governing body: U.S. Forest Service
- Website: Glacier View Wilderness

Glacier View Wilderness is a 3,073-acre (1,244 ha) wilderness adjacent to the west side of Mount Rainier National Park in Washington state. It was designated as wilderness in 1984. Glacier View Wilderness has views of the glaciated slopes of Mount Rainier which lies to the east. This includes viewing points from Mt. Belijica (5,476 feet) and Glacier View Point (5,507 feet). Glacier View Point is the former site of a fire lookout built in 1934. The wilderness is administered by the Gifford Pinchot National Forest through the Cowlitz Valley Ranger district with headquarters located in Randle, Washington.

== Recreation ==
The wilderness is accessible from SR 706 3 miles (5 km) east of Ashford, Washington through Forest Service Road 59. Primitive camping sites are located on several wilderness hiking trails. The Lake Christine/Mount Beljica #249 trail is a popular destination for hikers and backpackers. Lake Christine is approximately a mile one way and Mount Beljica is another three miles (5 km) from the lake off of FR 5920. Glacier View Trail #267 is farther down on FR 59 and is 3 miles (5 km) one way with a Mount Rainier viewpoint at the end. The Puyallup Trail #248 leads to Goat Lake and can be used to hike into Mount Rainier National Park and is also reached on FR 5920.
