= Tolmie Peak Fire Lookout =

- U.S. National Register of Historic Places
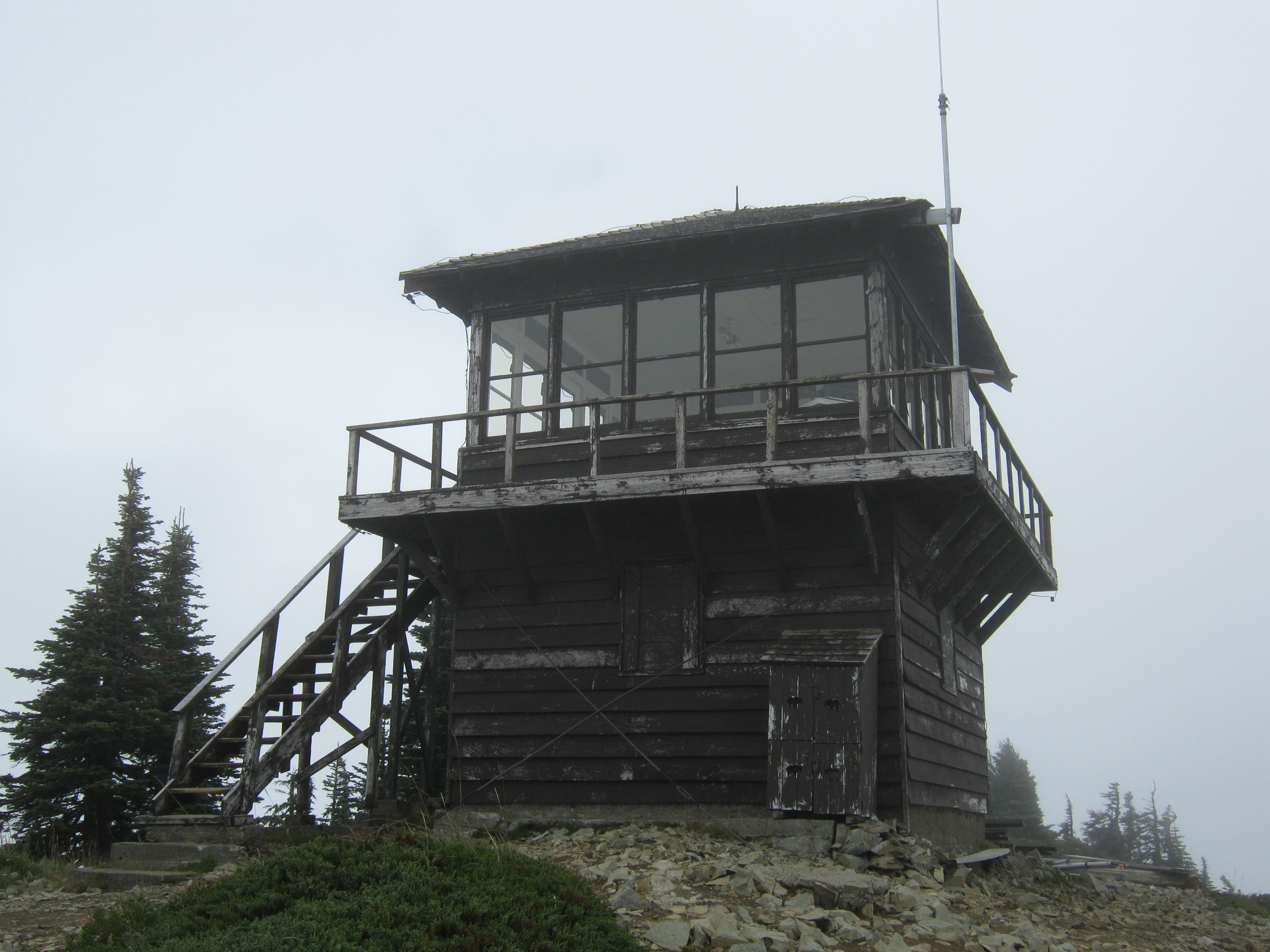

- Location within Washington (state)
- Nearest city: Mowich Lake Entrance, Washington
- Coordinates: 46°57′28″N 121°52′49″W
- Area: less than one acre
- Built: 1933
- Architectural style: Rustic style
- MPS: Mt. Rainier National Park MPS
- NRHP reference No.: 91000195
- Added to NRHP: March 13, 1991

The Tolmie Peak Fire Lookout is one of four fire lookout stations built in Mount Rainier National Park by the United States National Park Service (NPS) between 1932 and 1934. The two-story structure houses a lookout station on the upper level and storage at ground level. The design was prepared under the supervision of Edwin A. Nickel of the NPS Branch of Plans and Designs. The newly completed structure lost its roof to a windstorm and had to be repaired. It is secured against strong winds by cables attached to deadmen. The wood-frame structure is used as a visitor contact point on weekends.

The Tolmie Peak Lookout was placed on the National Register of Historic Places on March 13, 1991. It is part of the Mount Rainier National Historic Landmark District, which encompasses the entire park and which recognizes the park's inventory of Park Service-designed rustic architecture.
