= Huckleberry Creek Patrol Cabin =

- U.S. National Register of Historic Places
- Location within Washington (state)
- Nearest city: Sunrise, Washington
- Coordinates: 46°59′41″N 121°37′3″W
- Area: less than one acre
- Built: 1934
- Architectural style: Rustic style
- MPS: Mt. Rainier National Park MPS
- NRHP reference No.: 91000178
- Added to NRHP: March 13, 1991

The Huckleberry Creek Patrol Cabin is located in the northern portion of Mount Rainier National Park, Washington, United States. It was built around 1934 to house rangers on patrol within the park. The log cabin's design resembles the "Standard Plan for Patrol Cabins" prepared by the Western Division of the National Park Service, with the addition of a full-width front porch. Civilian Conservation Corps labor may have been used in the construction of the cabin.

The cabin was placed on the National Register of Historic Places on March 13, 1991. It is part of the Mount Rainier National Historic Landmark District, which encompasses the entire park and which recognizes the park's inventory of Park Service-designed rustic architecture.
