= Nisqually Entrance Historic District =

Historic district in Washington, United States

- U.S. National Register of Historic Places
- U.S. Historic district
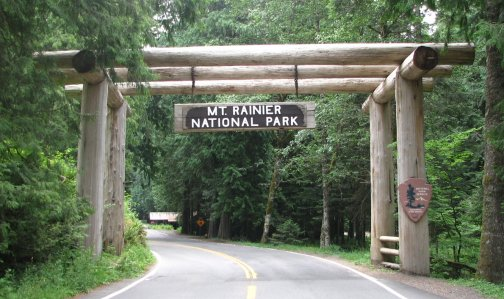
- Nisqually Gate

- Location within Washington (state)
- Location: Mt. Rainier National Park, Nisqually Entrance, Washington
- Coordinates: 46°44′28″N 121°54′56″W
- Area: 15 acres (6.1 ha)
- Architectural style: Rustic
- MPS: Mt. Rainier National Park MPS
- NRHP reference No.: 91000172
- Added to NRHP: March 13, 1991

The Nisqually Entrance Historic District comprises the first public entrance to Mount Rainier National Park. The district incorporates the log entrance arch typical of all Mount Rainier entrances, a log frame ranger station and checking station, a comfort station and miscellaneous service structures, all built around 1926, as well as the 1915 Superintendent's Residence and the 1908 Oscar Brown Cabin, the oldest remaining structure in the park. The buildings in the district conform to the principles of the National Park Service Rustic style that prevailed in park design of the 1920s and 1930s.

The district was added to the National Register of Historic Places on March 13, 1991. It is part of the Mount Rainier National Historic Landmark District, which encompasses the entire park and which recognizes the park's inventory of Park Service-designed rustic architecture.

== Features ==
The Nisqually Entrance Ranger Station was designed by National Park Service architect Daniel R. Hull and built in 1926, replacing the Oscar Brown Cabin as the first point of visitor contact upon entry to the park. The one-story L-shaped log cabin contained an office space and residences for two rangers. The front extension adjoins the road and functions as a checking station for entering cars. The station was featured in Thomas Chalmers Vint's Park and Recreation Structures publication, illustrating the principles of rustic park architecture. It was renovated by Civilian Conservation Corps workers in 1936, with a porte-cochere addition over the inbound traffic lane added in 1937. The porte-cochere's checking booth was destroyed in 1946 by a bus. A new, free-standing booth was built on an island in 1962. Interior renovations in 1937, 1966 and 1973 altered original interior details.

The Superintendent's Residence is a 1 1/2-story timber-framed structure, built as winter quarters for the park's superintendent. Between 1915 and 1923 the superintendents lived at Longmire in the summer. From 1924 Superintendent O.A. Tomlinson made the Nisqually residence the permanent superintendent's home. It has continued in that use. The house was built by DeWitt Reaburn, and originally measured 30 feet (9.1 m) by 45 feet (14 m) with an 8-foot (2.4 m) by 30-foot (9.1 m) porch across the front. An extensive renovation in 1965 added a carport and covered walkway joining it to the house. he original double-hung window sashes were replaced with sliding units and the interior was remodeled. The porch's log posts were replaced with heavy dimension lumber at some point.

The Ranger's Residence is a 1 1/2-story frame house in a split-level plan, built in 1915 by the Park Service.

The Oscar Brown Cabin was named after its first occupant, a park ranger who was of the first permanent rangers in the park. Built in 1908, the cabin functioned as a checking station for visitors entering the park and was the park's headquarters until 1916. The log house features an elaborate two-story front porch in varying sizes of logs. The upper level features an arched log from which small logs radiate to the roof gable, forming a sort of sunburst screen. A small lean-to bay was added in 1909, with another addition to the rear in 1910 that may have functioned as the superintendent's office. The cabin was the superintendent's winter quarters until 1915.

Other buildings in the district include an equipment building and men's and women's comfort stations (1927).
