= Mount Rainier National Park =

National park in Washington, United States

- IUCN category II (national park)
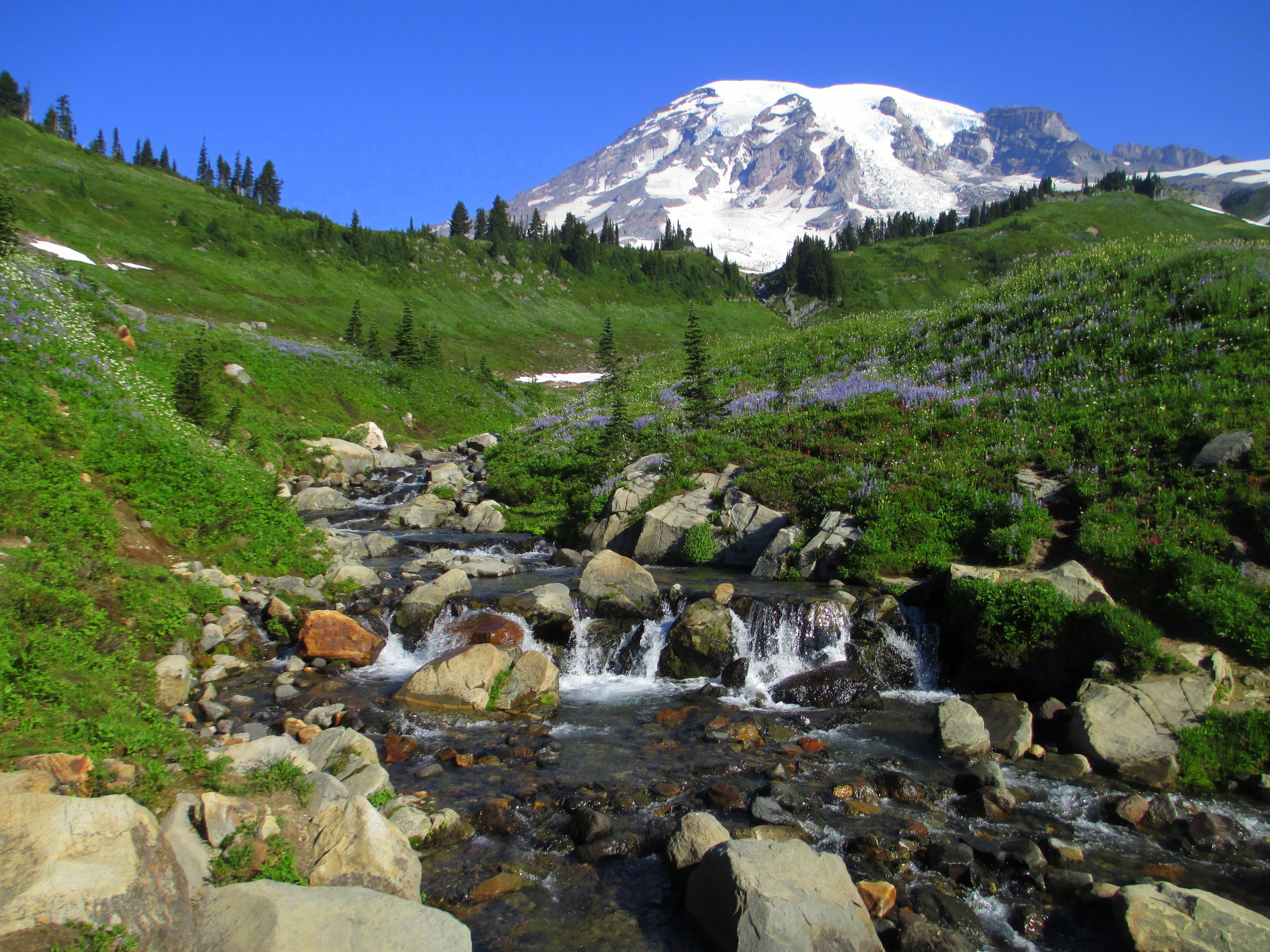
- Mount Rainier from above Myrtle Falls
- Interactive map of Mount Rainier National Park
- Location: Pierce County and Lewis County, Washington, United States
- Nearest city: Tacoma
- Coordinates: 46°51′N 121°45′W
- Area: 236,381 acres (956.60 km^{2})
- Established: March 2, 1899; 127 years ago
- Visitors: 1,620,006 (in 2024)
- Governing body: National Park Service
- Website: www.nps.gov/mora/index.htm

Mount Rainier National Park (/reɪ.ˈnɪər/ ray-NEER) is a national park of the United States located in southeast Pierce County and northeast Lewis County in the U.S. state of Washington. The park was established on March 2, 1899, as the fourth national park in the United States, preserving 236,381 acres (369.3 sq mi; 956.6 km^{2}) including all of Mount Rainier, a 14,406-foot (4,391 m) stratovolcano. The mountain rises abruptly from the surrounding land with elevations in the park ranging from 1,600 feet to over 14,000 feet (490–4,300 m). The highest point in the Cascade Range, Mount Rainier is surrounded by valleys, waterfalls, subalpine meadows, and 91,000 acres (142.2 sq mi; 368.3 km^{2}) of old-growth forest. More than 25 glaciers descend the flanks of the volcano, which is often shrouded in clouds that dump enormous amounts of rain and snow.

The park has several entrances that lead to three general areas: Paradise, the Carbon River and Mowich Lake area, and Sunrise. It had over 1.6 million visitors in 2024. Mount Rainier is circled by the Wonderland Trail and is covered by glaciers and snowfields totaling about 35 square miles (91 km^{2}). Carbon Glacier is the largest glacier by volume in the contiguous United States, while Emmons Glacier is the largest glacier by area. Mount Rainier is a popular peak for mountaineering with some 10,000 attempts per year, with approximately 50% making it to the summit.

== Park purpose ==
As stated in the foundation document:

The purpose of Mount Rainier National Park is to protect and preserve unimpaired the majestic icon of Mount Rainier, a glaciated volcano, along with its natural and cultural resources, values, and dynamic processes. The park provides opportunities for people to experience, understand, and care for the park environment, and also provides for wilderness experiences and sustains wilderness values.

== History ==
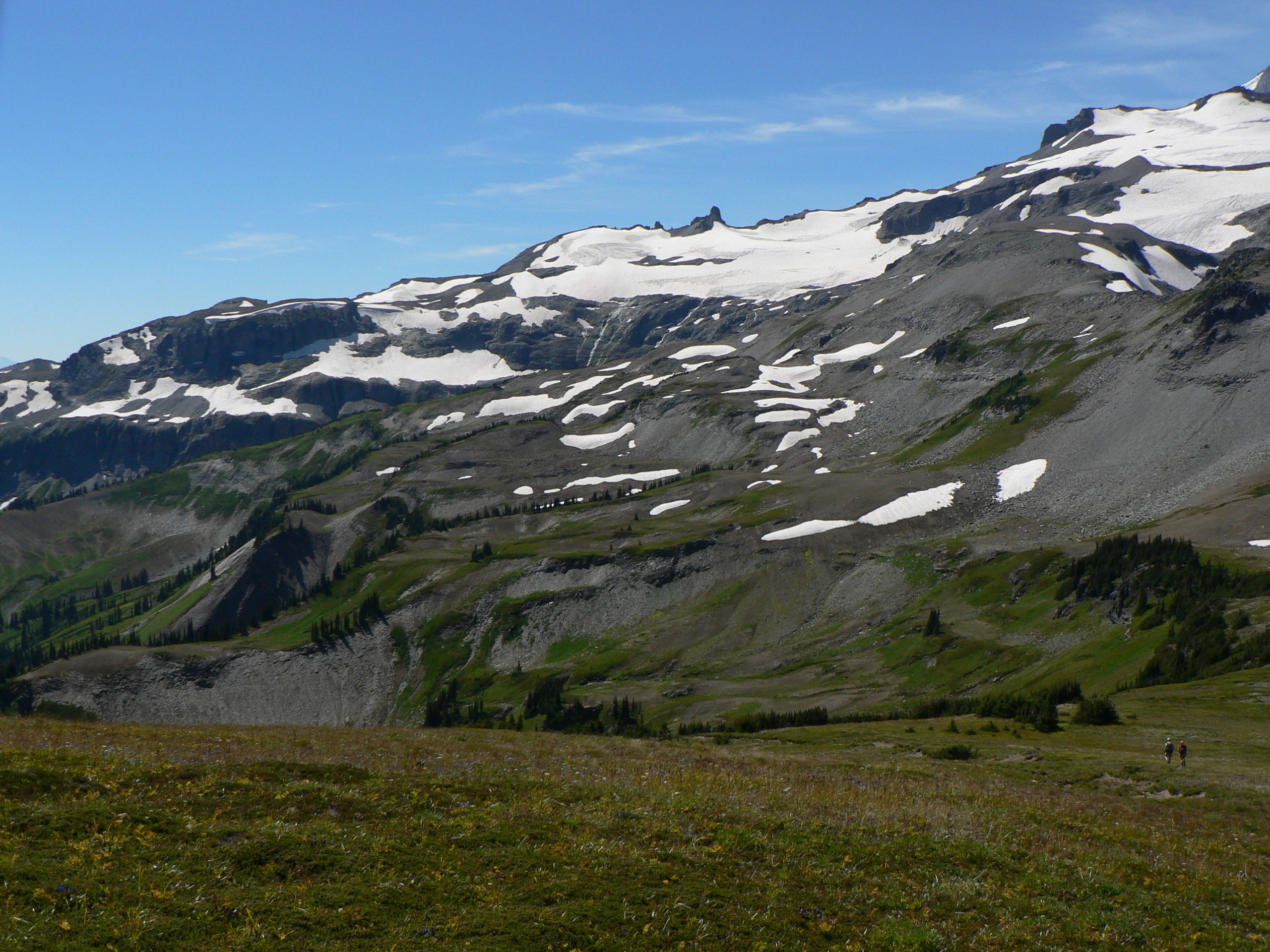
Ohanapecosh Glacier, as seen from the Wonderland Trail

Ninety-seven percent of the park is preserved as wilderness under the National Wilderness Preservation System as Mount Rainier Wilderness, a designation it received in 1988. It is abutted by the Tatoosh, Clearwater, Glacier View, and William O. Douglas Wildernesses. The park was designated a National Historic Landmark on February 18, 1997, as a showcase for the National Park Service rustic-style architecture of the 1920s and 1930s, exemplified by the Paradise Inn and a masterpiece of early NPS master planning. As a Historic Landmark district, the park was administratively listed on the National Register of Historic Places.

=== Native Americans ===
The name of the mountain itself in Lushootseed is "Tacoma" (pronounced "Taquoma"), the same as a nearby city in the Puget Sound region.

The earliest evidence of human activity in the area which is now Mount Rainier National Park is a projectile point dated to circa 4,000–5,800 BP (before present) found along Bench Lake Trail (the first section of Snow Lake Trail).

A more substantial archeological find was a rock shelter near Fryingpan Creek, east of Goat Island Mountain. Hunting artifacts were found in the shelter. The shelter would not have been used all year round. Cultural affinities suggest the site was used by Columbia Plateau Tribes from 1000 to 300 BP.

In 1963, the National Park Service contracted Washington State University to study Native American use of the Mount Rainier area. Richard D. Daugherty led an archeological study of the area and concluded that prehistoric humans used the area most heavily between 8000 and 4500 BP. Allan H. Smith interviewed elderly Native Americans and studied ethnographic literature. He found no evidence of permanent habitation in the park area. The park was used for hunting and gathering and for occasional spirit quests. Smith also came to tentative conclusions that the park was divided among five tribes along watershed boundaries: the Nisqually, Puyallup, Muckleshoot, Yakama, and Taidnapam (Upper Cowlitz). Subsequent studies cast doubt on Smith's theory that the tribes had agreed upon boundaries before they entered into treaties with the United States in 1854–55.

=== Park creation ===
The Mount Rainier Forest Preserve should be made a national park and guarded while yet its bloom is on; for if in the making of the West Nature had what we call parks in mind—places for rest, inspiration, and prayers—this Rainier region must surely be one of them.

— John Muir

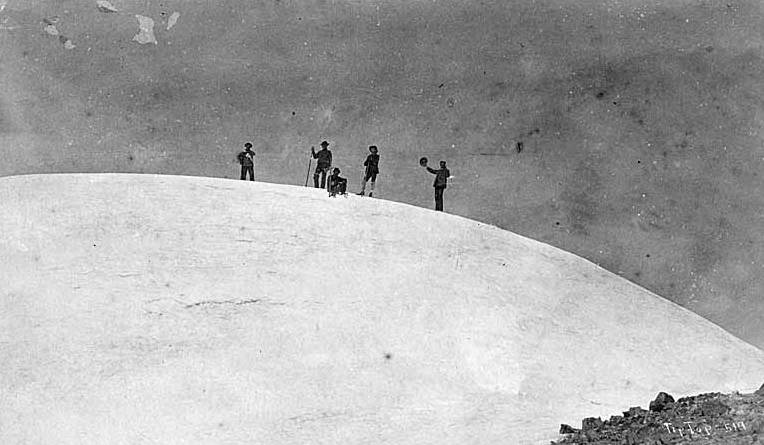
At the summit of Mount Rainier, 1888. Left to right: D. W. Bass, P. B. Van Trump, John Muir, N. O. Booth, Edward Sturgis Ingraham

On March 2, 1899, President William McKinley signed a bill passed by Congress authorizing the creation of Mount Rainier National Park, the nation's fifth national park. It was the first national park created from a national forest. The Pacific Forest Reserve had been created in 1893 and included Mount Rainier. It was enlarged in 1897 and renamed Mount Rainier Forest Reserve. John Muir had visited Mount Rainier in 1888. Muir and nine others, including Edward Sturgis Ingraham, Charles Piper, and P. B. Van Trump, climbed to the summit in what became the fifth recorded ascent.

The trip to Mount Rainier had played a role in reinvigorating Muir and convincing him to rededicate his life to the preservation of nature by establishing national parks. At the time, national forests, called forest reserves at first, were being created throughout the American West, under the utilitarian "conservation-through-use" view of Gifford Pinchot. Muir came to be known as a "preservationist". He wanted nature preserved under the more protected status of national parks. But during the 1890s, there was more public support for creating national forests than national parks. During that decade, Muir and his supporters were only able to protect one national forest as a national park. When the Pacific Forest Reserve was created in 1893, Muir quickly persuaded the newly formed Sierra Club to support a movement to protect Rainier as a national park. Other groups soon joined, such as the National Geographic Society and scientific associations wanting Mount Rainier preserved as a place to study volcanism and glaciology. Commercial leaders in Tacoma and Seattle were also in support, as was the Northern Pacific Railway. The effort lasted over five years and involved six different attempts to push a bill through Congress. Congress eventually agreed, but only after acquiring assurances that none of the new park was suitable for farming or mining and that no federal appropriations would be necessary for its management.

=== 2006 flooding ===
Mount Rainier National Park closed because of extensive flooding as a result of the November 6, 2006 Pineapple Express rainstorm when 18 inches (460 mm) of rain fell in 36 hours. Campsites and roads throughout the park were washed away. Power to Paradise and Longmire were disrupted. Sunshine Point Campground, just inside the Nisqually Entrance, was destroyed and has not reopened. Parts of the Carbon River Road, once a vehicle-accessible entrance to the park, also washed out. The road has since remained closed to vehicle traffic. On May 5, 2007, the park reopened to automobile traffic via State Route 706 at the Nisqually Entrance.

=== Closures and reservations ===
In November 2022, the National Park Service announced that access to the south side of the park beyond Longmire would be closed on weekdays due to inadequate staffing. Several recreation areas, including a sledding hill, were also closed for the rest of the winter season. The closure was unpopular with recreation groups. It was modified in 2023 to allow winter access to Paradise from Thursdays through Mondays.

Beginning in 2024, timed entry reservations will be required for vehicles using entrances on the Paradise and Sunrise corridors during daylight hours in the peak summer months. The system was implemented due to increased crowding at the park between July and September, when 70 percent of the annual 1.6 million patrons visit and cause traffic congestion. NPS also considered using parking permits and bus shuttles from a remote parking lot similar to systems at other national parks. For the 2025 season, reservations were only required in the Sunrise corridor from July to September on all days and from September to October for weekends and holidays. Access to the Paradise corridor returned to being first-come, first-served; the Mowich entrance was closed due to the state's decision to prohibit traffic on the Fairfax Bridge, which carries State Route 165 over the Carbon River near the entrance.

== Biology ==
=== Flora ===
According to the A. W. Kuchler U.S. Potential natural vegetation types, Mount Rainier National Park has an Alpine Meadows & Barren, or Alpine tundra (52) potential vegetation type with an Alpine Meadow (11) potential vegetation form. The park's vegetation is diverse, reflecting the varied climatic and environmental conditions encountered across the park's 12,800-foot elevation gradient. More than 960 vascular plant species and more than 260 nonvascular plant species have been identified in the park.

=== Fauna ===
Mammals that inhabit this national park include cougar, black bear, raccoon, coyote, bobcat, snowshoe hare, weasel, mole, beaver, red fox, porcupine, skunk, marmot, deer, marten, shrew, pika, elk, and mountain goat. The common birds of this park including raptors are the thrush, chickadee, kinglet, northern goshawk, willow flycatcher, spotted owl, steller's jay, Clark's nutcracker, bald eagle, ptarmigan, harlequin duck, grouse, peregrine falcon, Canada jay, golden eagle, grosbeak and finch.

Fish that inhabit the lakes, rivers, and streams within the park include bull trout, cutthroat trout, rainbow trout, mountain whitefish, and sculpins. Anadromous fish enter the park during migratory cycles. Chinook salmon and coho salmon, although rare within the park boundary, can be found spawning in the White, West Fork, Puyallup, Mowich, and Carbon watersheds. Pink salmon spawn on odd-numbered years in heavy numbers up the White River near the park boundary. Due to historical stocking and damming of rivers in and around the park, native numbers of most salmonoids are unknown.

== Climate ==
According to the Köppen climate classification system, the best definition for Mount Rainier National Park is Mediterranean-influenced humid continental climate (Dsb) or subarctic climate (Dsc), depending on the elevation. According to the United States Department of Agriculture, the Plant Hardiness zone at Sunrise Visitor Center (6,398 feet (1,950 m) elevation) is 6a with an average annual extreme minimum temperature of -5.5 °F (-20.8 °C).

The National Park Service says that "Paradise is the snowiest place on Earth where snowfall is measured regularly." During the 1971/72 year, 93.5 ft (28,500 mm) of snow fell, setting a world record for that year. Subsequently, in the 1998/99 year, Mount Baker Ski Area received 95 ft (28,956 mm). Paradise holds the Cascade Range record for most snow on the ground with 30.583 feet (9,321.7 mm) on March 10, 1956.

Climate data for Longmire Rainier NPS, Washington, 1991–2020 normals, extremes 1909–present
Month	Jan	Feb	Mar	Apr	May	Jun	Jul	Aug	Sep	Oct	Nov	Dec	Year
Record high °F (°C)	63 (17)	69 (21)	73 (23)	87 (31)	95 (35)	105 (41)	105 (41)	101 (38)	101 (38)	88 (31)	72 (22)	60 (16)	105 (41)
Mean maximum °F (°C)	46.3 (7.9)	50.4 (10.2)	60.6 (15.9)	70.3 (21.3)	81.5 (27.5)	86.4 (30.2)	91.8 (33.2)	91.3 (32.9)	87.4 (30.8)	72.7 (22.6)	54.6 (12.6)	45.7 (7.6)	94.7 (34.8)
Mean daily maximum °F (°C)	37.2 (2.9)	40.2 (4.6)	44.6 (7.0)	50.5 (10.3)	59.9 (15.5)	65.9 (18.8)	75.3 (24.1)	75.6 (24.2)	68.6 (20.3)	54.5 (12.5)	42.5 (5.8)	36.4 (2.4)	54.3 (12.4)
Daily mean °F (°C)	31.6 (−0.2)	33.0 (0.6)	36.2 (2.3)	40.6 (4.8)	48.4 (9.1)	53.7 (12.1)	60.8 (16.0)	60.9 (16.1)	55.1 (12.8)	44.8 (7.1)	35.9 (2.2)	30.8 (−0.7)	44.3 (6.9)
Mean daily minimum °F (°C)	25.9 (−3.4)	25.9 (−3.4)	27.7 (−2.4)	30.8 (−0.7)	36.8 (2.7)	41.5 (5.3)	46.3 (7.9)	46.1 (7.8)	41.6 (5.3)	35.2 (1.8)	29.3 (−1.5)	25.1 (−3.8)	34.4 (1.3)
Mean minimum °F (°C)	15.9 (−8.9)	16.3 (−8.7)	20.4 (−6.4)	24.9 (−3.9)	29.2 (−1.6)	35.3 (1.8)	40.2 (4.6)	39.4 (4.1)	34.0 (1.1)	25.6 (−3.6)	20.3 (−6.5)	15.0 (−9.4)	9.6 (−12.4)
Record low °F (°C)	−9 (−23)	−5 (−21)	−1 (−18)	12 (−11)	21 (−6)	27 (−3)	32 (0)	33 (1)	24 (−4)	15 (−9)	3 (−16)	−6 (−21)	−9 (−23)
Average precipitation inches (mm)	11.45 (291)	8.60 (218)	7.55 (192)	5.93 (151)	4.75 (121)	3.70 (94)	1.22 (31)	1.49 (38)	3.50 (89)	9.00 (229)	12.96 (329)	12.42 (315)	82.57 (2,098)
Average snowfall inches (cm)	32.7 (83)	19.2 (49)	25.4 (65)	9.7 (25)	2.1 (5.3)	0.1 (0.25)	0.0 (0.0)	0.0 (0.0)	0.0 (0.0)	0.9 (2.3)	18.6 (47)	34.3 (87)	143.0 (363)
Average extreme snow depth inches (cm)	27.5 (70)	27.8 (71)	28.0 (71)	16.6 (42)	4.5 (11)	0.1 (0.25)	0.0 (0.0)	0.0 (0.0)	0.0 (0.0)	0.6 (1.5)	9.0 (23)	19.5 (50)	37.5 (95)
Average precipitation days (≥ 0.01 in)	20.8	17.3	20.2	18.5	16.7	14.3	6.8	6.5	9.9	17.0	20.1	20.2	188.3
Average snowy days (≥ 0.1 in)	8.5	8.2	8.7	4.1	1.0	0.0	0.0	0.0	0.0	0.5	5.5	10.5	47.0
Source: NOAA

Climate data for Paradise Ranger Station, 1991–2020 normals, extremes 1916–present
Month	Jan	Feb	Mar	Apr	May	Jun	Jul	Aug	Sep	Oct	Nov	Dec	Year
Record high °F (°C)	65 (18)	63 (17)	70 (21)	78 (26)	83 (28)	90 (32)	92 (33)	92 (33)	89 (32)	88 (31)	78 (26)	63 (17)	92 (33)
Mean maximum °F (°C)	48.9 (9.4)	49.9 (9.9)	52.2 (11.2)	59.5 (15.3)	68.4 (20.2)	72.1 (22.3)	78.6 (25.9)	78.9 (26.1)	75.6 (24.2)	65.6 (18.7)	54.4 (12.4)	48.0 (8.9)	81.4 (27.4)
Mean daily maximum °F (°C)	34.5 (1.4)	34.1 (1.2)	35.7 (2.1)	40.0 (4.4)	48.2 (9.0)	53.6 (12.0)	62.2 (16.8)	63.6 (17.6)	57.4 (14.1)	46.4 (8.0)	37.0 (2.8)	32.6 (0.3)	45.4 (7.5)
Daily mean °F (°C)	29.2 (−1.6)	28.3 (−2.1)	29.7 (−1.3)	33.2 (0.7)	40.6 (4.8)	45.2 (7.3)	53.1 (11.7)	54.4 (12.4)	49.3 (9.6)	39.6 (4.2)	31.5 (−0.3)	27.3 (−2.6)	38.5 (3.6)
Mean daily minimum °F (°C)	23.8 (−4.6)	22.6 (−5.2)	23.6 (−4.7)	26.4 (−3.1)	33.0 (0.6)	36.8 (2.7)	43.9 (6.6)	45.2 (7.3)	41.2 (5.1)	32.8 (0.4)	26.0 (−3.3)	22.0 (−5.6)	31.4 (−0.3)
Mean minimum °F (°C)	11.8 (−11.2)	9.6 (−12.4)	12.3 (−10.9)	16.0 (−8.9)	21.2 (−6.0)	26.3 (−3.2)	32.1 (0.1)	33.3 (0.7)	29.9 (−1.2)	19.6 (−6.9)	13.6 (−10.2)	9.4 (−12.6)	3.4 (−15.9)
Record low °F (°C)	−13 (−25)	−18 (−28)	−2 (−19)	2 (−17)	10 (−12)	13 (−11)	15 (−9)	22 (−6)	18 (−8)	2 (−17)	−11 (−24)	−20 (−29)	−20 (−29)
Average precipitation inches (mm)	17.22 (437)	12.93 (328)	13.21 (336)	8.35 (212)	5.08 (129)	3.84 (98)	1.41 (36)	1.64 (42)	4.43 (113)	11.25 (286)	18.16 (461)	18.92 (481)	116.44 (2,959)
Average snowfall inches (cm)	118.7 (301)	91.6 (233)	90.6 (230)	67.5 (171)	26.1 (66)	5.6 (14)	0.3 (0.76)	0.0 (0.0)	1.4 (3.6)	24.1 (61)	120.9 (307)	124.0 (315)	670.8 (1,702.36)
Average extreme snow depth inches (cm)	135.2 (343)	159.7 (406)	184.9 (470)	187.4 (476)	164.6 (418)	113.2 (288)	44.8 (114)	5.2 (13)	0.8 (2.0)	12.0 (30)	48.4 (123)	99.0 (251)	195.2 (496)
Average precipitation days (≥ 0.01 in)	21.1	17.8	21.5	18.8	15.4	12.8	7.3	6.6	9.6	15.0	21.7	21.1	188.7
Average snowy days (≥ 0.1 in)	18.5	15.9	19.5	14.4	7.9	2.5	0.2	0.0	0.7	6.2	16.6	19.0	121.4
Source 1: National Weather Service
Source 2: NOAA (average snowfall/snowy days and precip days 1981–2010)

Climate data for Sunrise Visitor Center, Mount Rainier National Park. (Elev: 6309 ft / 1923 m) 1981–2010
Month	Jan	Feb	Mar	Apr	May	Jun	Jul	Aug	Sep	Oct	Nov	Dec	Year
Mean daily maximum °F (°C)	30.5 (−0.8)	32.1 (0.1)	35.2 (1.8)	39.8 (4.3)	46.4 (8.0)	51.9 (11.1)	60.8 (16.0)	61.8 (16.6)	56.1 (13.4)	44.7 (7.1)	33.8 (1.0)	29.6 (−1.3)	43.6 (6.4)
Daily mean °F (°C)	24.9 (−3.9)	25.3 (−3.7)	27.5 (−2.5)	31.4 (−0.3)	37.6 (3.1)	43.0 (6.1)	50.7 (10.4)	51.6 (10.9)	46.9 (8.3)	37.3 (2.9)	28.2 (−2.1)	24.1 (−4.4)	35.8 (2.1)
Mean daily minimum °F (°C)	19.4 (−7.0)	18.5 (−7.5)	19.9 (−6.7)	23.0 (−5.0)	28.8 (−1.8)	34.1 (1.2)	40.6 (4.8)	41.3 (5.2)	37.7 (3.2)	29.8 (−1.2)	22.6 (−5.2)	18.6 (−7.4)	27.9 (−2.3)
Average precipitation inches (mm)	11.84 (301)	8.73 (222)	8.12 (206)	5.52 (140)	3.80 (97)	4.08 (104)	1.83 (46)	1.22 (31)	2.93 (74)	5.29 (134)	12.38 (314)	13.19 (335)	78.93 (2,005)
Average relative humidity (%)	80.0	74.7	69.4	72.6	68.6	68.1	69.0	66.7	65.7	68.0	79.6	80.3	71.9
Average dew point °F (°C)	19.6 (−6.9)	18.4 (−7.6)	18.8 (−7.3)	23.6 (−4.7)	28.2 (−2.1)	33.2 (0.7)	40.9 (4.9)	40.9 (4.9)	36.0 (2.2)	27.7 (−2.4)	22.7 (−5.2)	18.9 (−7.3)	27.5 (−2.5)
Source: PRISM Climate Group

== Major attractions ==
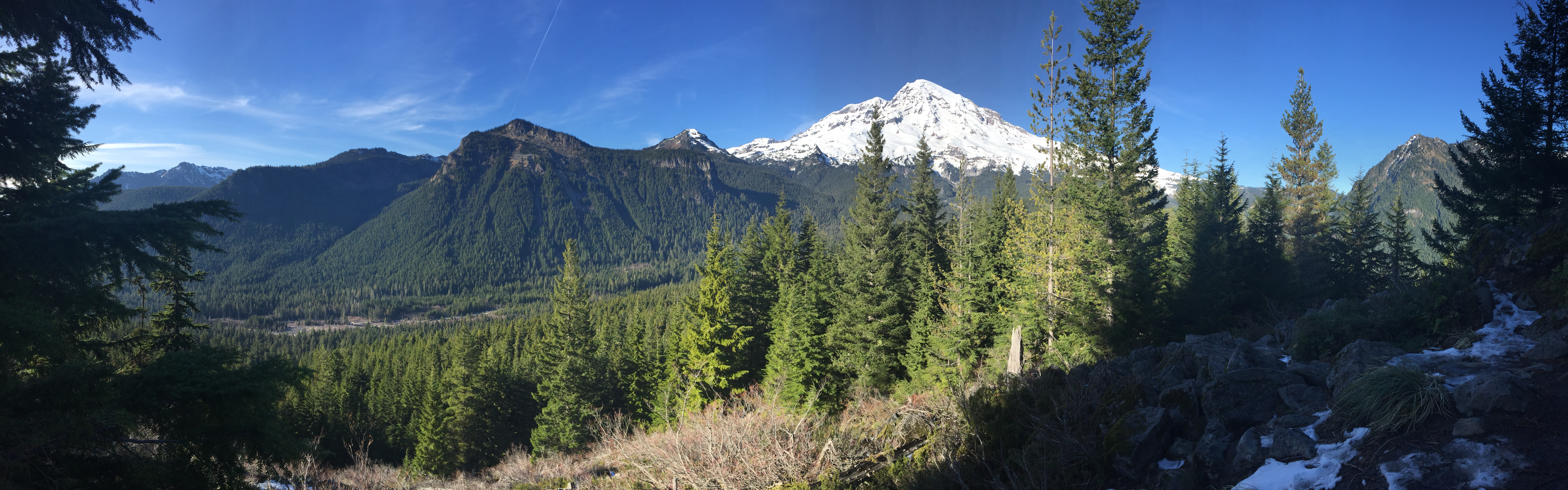
Mount Rainier National Park panorama

The entire park was designated a National Historic Landmark District on February 18, 1997, in recognition of the consistently high standard of design and preservation of the park's National Park Service rustic-style architecture. The park contains 42 locations designated on the National Register of Historic Places, including four National Historic Landmarks.

The park's most popular natural features vary based on the season. During the spring, the remaining snow and waterfalls are visible from many trails and other portions of the park; a summertime wildflower bloom in July and August also attracts many visitors.

From 2008 to 2019, over 10,000 people per year have attempted to climb to the summit of Mount Rainier; a fee is levied by the National Park Service to fund ranger station and camp staffing as well as search-and-rescue services. As of 2024, three companies are authorized to operate commercial mountain guide services in the national park for the entire year; single-trip guides are also available through 15 services that the National Park Service authorizes. From 1967 to 1997, RMI Expeditions was the sole company authorized to organize commercial guided climbs to the summit until the program was opened to other companies to encourage competition.

=== Paradise ===
View of the south face of Mount Rainier from the Skyline Trail in Paradise

Paradise (46.79°N 121.74°W) is the name of an area at approximately 5,400 feet (1,600 m) on the south slope of Mount Rainier in the national park. Paradise is the most popular destination for visitors to Mount Rainier National Park. 62% of the over 1.3 million people who visited the park in 2000 went to Paradise. Paradise, near the subalpine valley of the Paradise River, is the location of the historic Paradise Inn, built in 1916; Paradise Guide House, built in 1920; and Henry M. Jackson Visitor Center, built in 1966 rebuilt in 2008.

=== Longmire ===
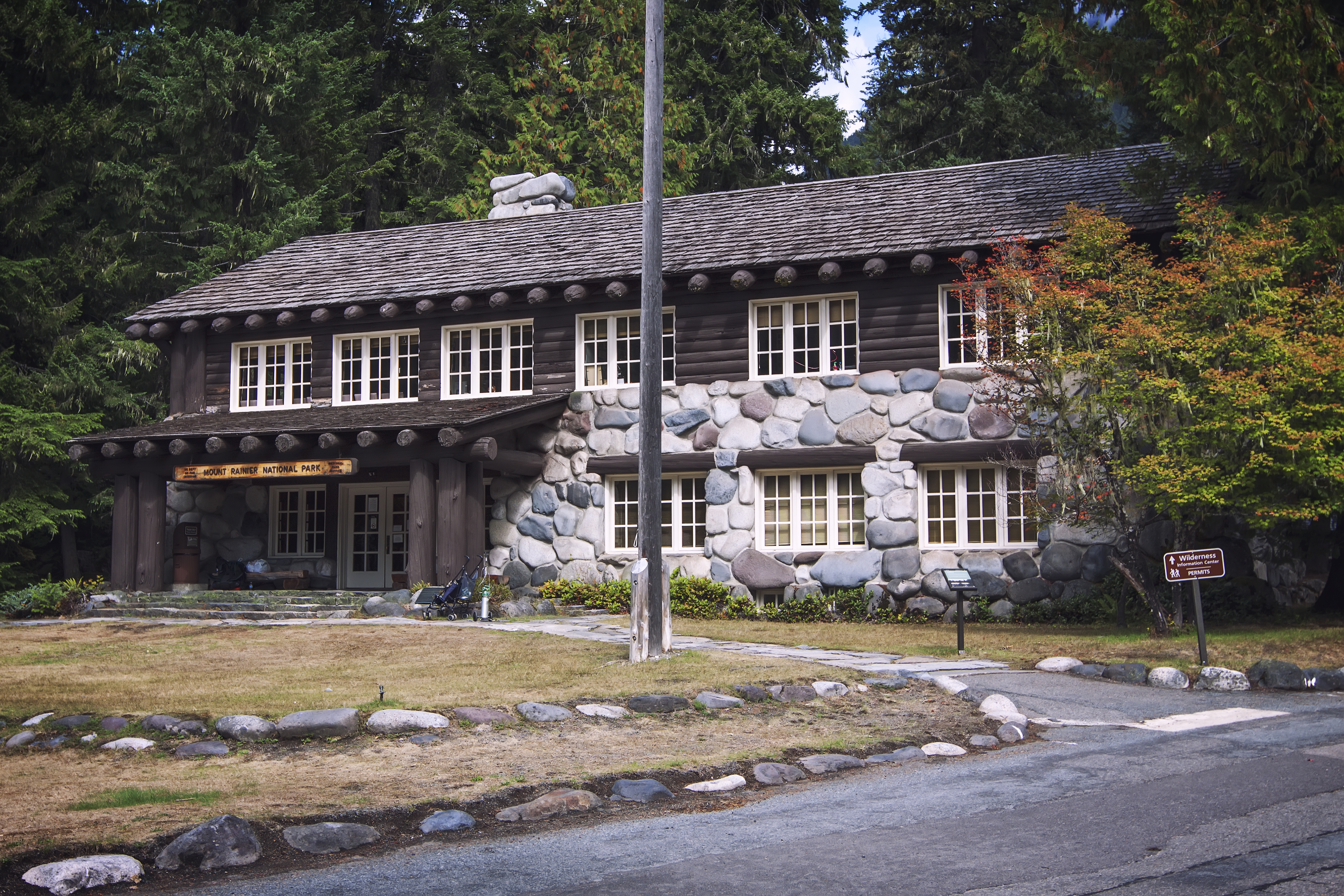
National Park Service 1928 Administration Building at Longmire

Longmire (46.75°N 121.81°W) is a visitor center in Mount Rainier National Park, located 6.5 miles (10.5 km) east of the Nisqually Entrance. The area is named after James Longmire, an early settler in Puget Sound. The area is in the Nisqually River valley at an elevation of 2,761 feet (842 m) between The Ramparts Ridge and the Tatoosh Range. Longmire is surrounded by old-growth Douglas fir, western red cedar, and western hemlock.

Longmire is the location of Mount Rainier's National Park Inn, the Longmire Museum, and the 1928 National Park Service Administration Building, which is now a Wilderness Information Center. The National Park Inn is the only accommodation in the park open all year round.

Longmire is the second most popular destination for visitors to Mount Rainier National Park after Paradise. Of the more than 1.3 million people who visited the park in 2000, 38% visited Longmire. The Cougar Rock Campground is about 2 miles (3.2 km) north west of Longmire with 173 individual campsites and 5 group sites and open from late May through late September. Longmire is one of the starting points of the Wonderland Trail.

=== Sunrise ===
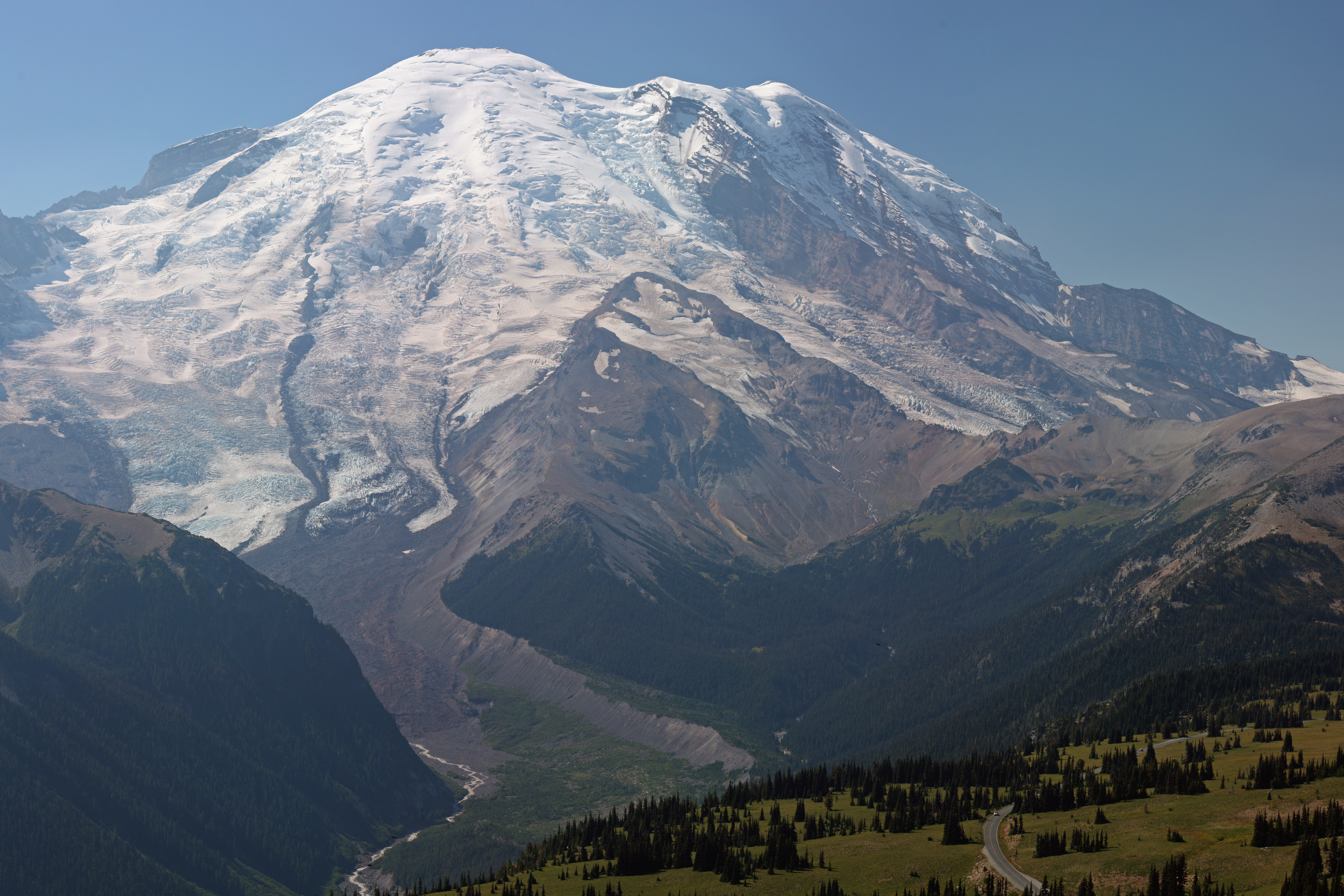
The Emmons Glacier (upper left) dominates the northeast face of Mount Rainier in the view from the subalpine meadows of Sunrise (lower right).

Sunrise (46.91°N 121.64°W) is a lodge and visitor center located in the northeastern part of the park. At an elevation of 6,400 feet (1,950 m), it is the highest point in the park that is accessible by vehicle. There are miles of trails located all around Sunrise, such as Mount Fremont, Burroughs Mountain, and Sourdough Ridge. The lodge is reachable via a 10-mile (16 km) turnoff from State Route 410 near the White River entrance.

=== Other developed areas ===
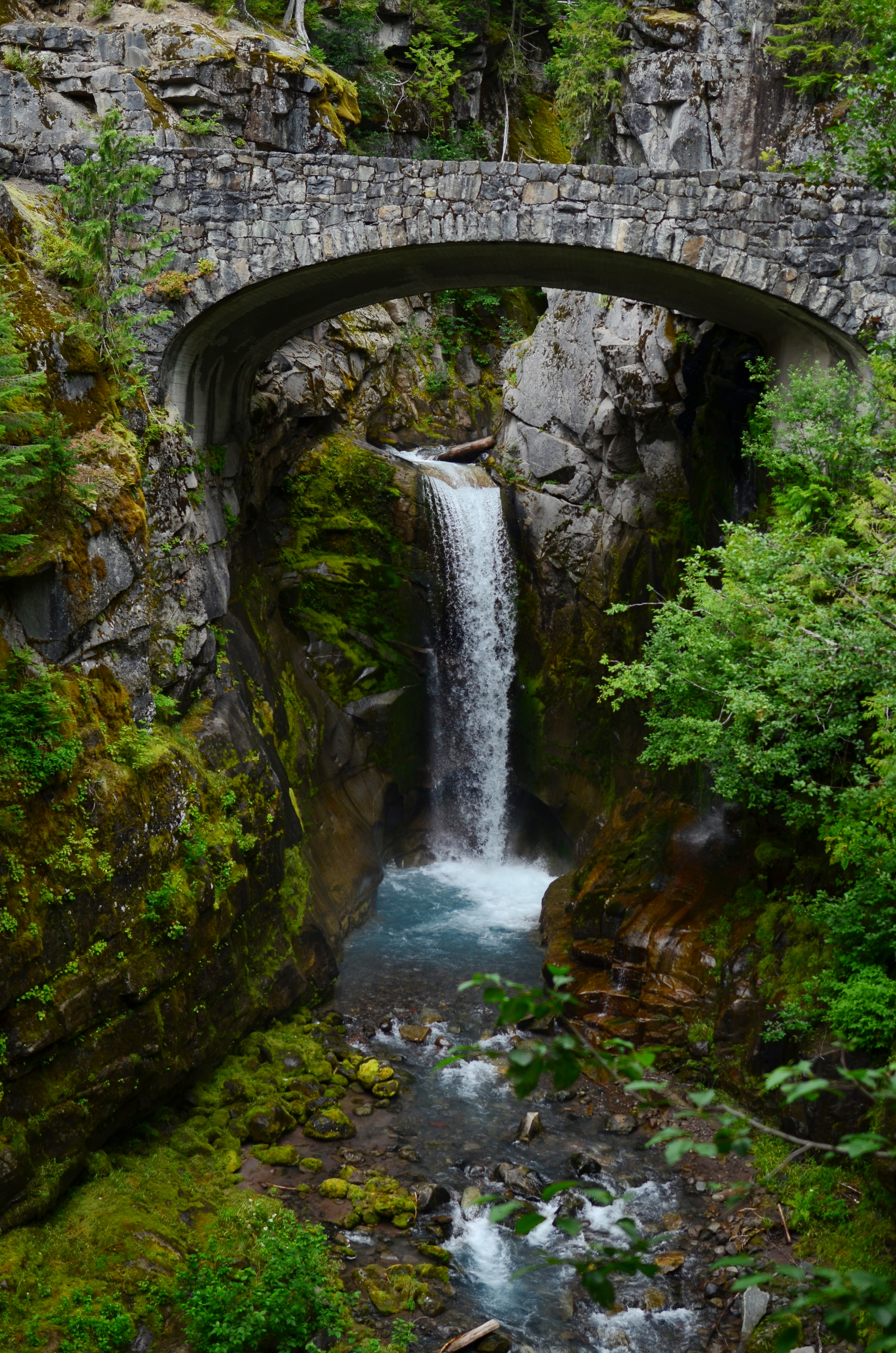
Christine Falls, one of many waterfalls visible after a short walk from the main road

Ohanapecosh /oʊˈhænəpɪkɔːʃ/ is a campground (with 188 individual sites and 2 group sites, open from late May through late September), visitor center (closed during the 2013 season), and ranger station located in the southeastern portion of the park, approximately 3 miles (4.8 km) from the park boundary off State Route 123. Located in a deep valley among old-growth forest at an elevation below 2,000 feet (610 m), it is the only developed area of the park without a view of Mount Rainier. The Ohanapecosh Hot Springs, Grove of the Patriarchs, and Silver Falls are all located in the Ohanapecosh area.

The Carbon River Entrance Station is located in the northwest corner of the park off State Route 165 and is the site of the only rainforest at Mount Rainier. There is a campground and a short trail through the rainforest, as well as a trail to the Carbon Glacier, one of the lowest glaciers in the contiguous United States.

Mowich Lake is the largest and deepest lake in the park, located south of Carbon at the south end of State Route 165. A campground, picnic area, and hiking trail are located near the lake.

The two major roads into the northwest quadrant of the Park were severely damaged by the floods of 2006. The ranger station at the Carbon River entrance is staffed during the summer. No motor vehicles are permitted beyond that point.

== Transportation ==
The park is primarily accessed by vehicles; in 2021, over 1 million vehicles carried the majority of the 2.4 million visitors to Mount Rainier National Park. The Nisqually Entrance is served by State Route 706, while State Route 410 cuts across the northeast corner of the park. State Route 123 connects the southeastern side of the park to State Route 410 and U.S. Route 12.

A regional airport was proposed for several sites in southern Pierce County that would be 17 to 23 miles (27 to 37 km) from the park. The park superintendent and environmental groups opposed its development due to the potential effects of noise pollution and air pollution on wildlife, as well as traffic impacts around the park entrances.

== See also ==
- Bibliography of Mount Rainier National Park
- Amphibians and reptiles of Mount Rainier National Park
- List of national parks of the United States
