= National Register of Historic Places listings in Pierce County, Washington =

Location of Pierce County in Washington

This is intended to be a complete list of the properties and districts on the National Register of Historic Places in Pierce County, Washington, United States. Latitude and longitude coordinates are provided for many National Register properties and districts; these locations may be seen together in an online map.

There are 194 properties and districts listed on the National Register in the county. 98 of these properties and districts are located in the city of Tacoma, while the remaining 96 properties and districts are listed separately. Another 2 properties were once listed but have been removed.

This National Park Service list is complete through NPS recent listings posted November 6, 2026.

== Pierce County (exclusive of Tacoma) ==
	Name on the Register	Image	Date listed	Location	City or town	Description
1	Alderton School	Alderton School	July 15, 1987 (#87001171)	9512 Orting Hwy., E. 47°10′12″N 122°13′43″W	Alderton	Along with a separate gymnasium, Alderton School was constructed in 1915. The brick buildings were last used as a school facility in 1958. The schoolhouse was partially demolished in 2026.
2	Anderson Island School	Anderson Island School	July 15, 1987 (#87001165)	Eckenstam-Johnson Rd. 47°09′32″N 122°42′14″W	Anderson Island	Built in 1904, this is the oldest one-room schoolhouse in Pierce County. Rural Public Schools of Washington State MPS
3	Arletta School	Arletta School	September 28, 1987 (#87001163)	3507 Ray Nash Drive NW; 47°17′23″N 122°39′44″W	Gig Harbor	This former school was built by the Works Progress Administration in 1938, and is now used as a community center. Rural Public Schools of Washington State MPS
4	Ashford Mansion	Ashford Mansion	August 30, 1984 (#84003560)	Off I-5; 46°45′36″N 122°01′26″W	Ashford	Built by Walter and Cora Ashford in a Colonial-Revival style.
5	William Bisson House	William Bisson House	February 19, 1982 (#82004276)	206 Emery Ave, corner of Washington Street; 47°08′24″N 122°05′54″W	South Prairie	
6	Boatman-Ainsworth House	Boatman-Ainsworth House	February 19, 1982 (#82004277)	6000 112th St., SW; 47°09′21″N 122°31′03″W	Lakewood	The oldest surviving home in Lakewood.
7	Camp Muir	Camp Muir	March 13, 1991 (#91000176)	Paradise; 46°50′07″N 121°43′58″W	Mount Rainier National Park	Also known as Cloud Camp, is on the southeast slope of the mountain, at 10,062 feet (3,067 m). Named for John Muir.
8	Chinook Pass Entrance Arch	Chinook Pass Entrance Arch	March 13, 1991 (#91000202)	Chinook Pass; 46°52′20″N 121°30′52″W	Mount Rainier National Park	
9	Christ Episcopal Church	Christ Episcopal Church	December 15, 1994 (#94001440)	210 Fifth St. SW. 47°11′27″N 122°17′53″W	Puyallup	Built in 1927 to replace a smaller church.
10	Christine Falls Bridge	Christine Falls Bridge	March 13, 1991 (#91000196)	Paradise; 46°46′51″N 121°46′47″W	Mount Rainier National Park	
11	Coke Ovens	Coke Ovens	June 10, 1974 (#74001976)	Southeast of Wilkeson at RR tracks 47°06′09″N 122°02′21″W	Wilkeson	These 12-foot (4 m) tall ovens began being built in 1885 for cooking coal into coke. Of the original 160 ovens, 40 still remain.
12	Charles and Mary Louise Curran House	Charles and Mary Louise Curran House	March 7, 2012 (#12000088)	4009 Curran Ln. 47°13′18″N 122°33′43″W	University Place	
13	Custer School	Custer School	July 15, 1987 (#87001162)	7700 Steilacoom Blvd. SW; 47°10′52″N 122°32′17″W	Lakewood	Also known as the "Little Red Schoolhouse"; Rural Public Schools of Washington State MPS
14	David Dadisman House	David Dadisman House	March 31, 1995 (#95000305)	1814 A St., Key Peninsula N 47°16′28″N 122°45′33″W	Home	
15	Davidson House	Davidson House	March 27, 1973 (#73001884)	1802 Commercial Street; 47°10′27″N 122°35′47″W	Steilacoom	Also known as the Philip Keach House.
16	Emma Smith DeVoe House	Emma Smith DeVoe House	May 6, 1993 (#93000369)	208 E. 133rd Street; 47°08′10″N 122°25′44″W	Parkland	
17	Dieringer School	Dieringer School	April 14, 1997 (#97000324)	1808 E. Valley Hwy. 47°14′28″N 122°13′33″W	Sumner	This Georgian Revival style building served as a school until 1992, when it turned into a corporate office. Rural Public Schools of Washington State MPS
18	DuPont Village Historic District	DuPont Village Historic District	September 10, 1987 (#87001542)	Roughly bounded by Santa Cruz, Brandywine, DuPont, and Penniman; 47°05′49″N 122°37′50″W	Dupont	
19	Edith Creek Chlorination House	Edith Creek Chlorination House	March 13, 1991 (#91000201)	Paradise; 46°47′38″N 121°43′54″W	Mount Rainier National Park	
20	Elbe Evangelical Lutheran Church	Elbe Evangelical Lutheran Church	October 8, 1976 (#76001899)	I-5; 46°45′52″N 122°11′39″W	Elbe	The land and lumber to build the church were donated by German immigrants Henry and Clara Lutken. The main building of the church is 24 feet (7.3 m) by 18 feet (5.5 m), but the steeple rises 55 feet (17 m), and is topped with an iron cross.
21	Ezra Meeker Mansion	Ezra Meeker Mansion	August 26, 1971 (#71000879)	321 Pioneer Ave., E. 47°11′29″N 122°17′23″W	Puyallup	Built in 1875, this 17-room house was the home of Oregon Trail migrant Ezra Meeker.
22	Fairfax Bridge	Fairfax Bridge	July 16, 1982 (#82004273)	Spans Carbon River, south of Wilkeson; 47°02′31″N 122°02′28″W	Melmont	This bridge's deck sits 250 feet (76 m) above the Carbon River, which made it the tallest structure in Washington at the time it was built. Historic Bridges and Tunnels in Washington TR
23	Fort Nisqually Site	Fort Nisqually Site	October 16, 1974 (#74001971)	Northwest of Dupont off I-5; 47°06′33″N 122°39′45″W	Dupont	The first European trading post on Puget Sound, established in 1833, the Granary and Factor's house were moved to Point Defiance Park in the 1930s.
24	Fort Steilacoom	Fort Steilacoom	November 25, 1977 (#77001350)	Northeast of Steilacoom; 47°10′48″N 122°33′58″W	Steilacoom	Only operating as a fort from 1849 to 1868, the fort was then turned into the Western State Hospital. Today four officer's quarters built around 1858 remain from the original fort.
25	Fox Island School	Fox Island School	July 15, 1987 (#87001167)	Gway Drive and Ninth Street; 47°15′15″N 122°37′13″W	Fox Island	This former school was built in 1934 by the Works Progress Administration, and has served as a community center since 1961, when the island began busing its students to nearby Gig Harbor. Rural Public Schools of Washington State MPS
26	John Galbraith House	John Galbraith House	March 19, 1982 (#82004271)	140 Oak St., E. 46°51′51″N 122°15′48″W	Eatonville	Also known as Mill House and Eatonville Lumber Company House.
27	Glencove Hotel	Glencove Hotel	May 22, 1978 (#78002767)	West of Gig Harbor off SR 302. 47°20′49″N 122°43′49″W	Gig Harbor	Built in 1897, the building still serves as a hotel.
28	Gobbler's Knob Fire Lookout	Gobbler's Knob Fire Lookout	March 13, 1991 (#91000191)	Nisqually Entrance; 46°47′39″N 121°54′48″W	Mount Rainier National Park	
29	Peter L. and Emma Hershey Homestead	Peter L. and Emma Hershey Homestead	August 15, 2007 (#07000833)	33514 Mount Tahoma Canyon Rd. 46°45′40″N 121°59′24″W	Ashford	A cabin built in 1888 in the Upper Nisqually Valley.
30	Holy Trinity Orthodox Church	Holy Trinity Orthodox Church	September 28, 1989 (#89001606)	433 Long Street; 47°06′27″N 122°02′42″W	Wilkeson	Built in 1913, this church features a Russian-style onion dome.
31	Home School	Home School	April 12, 1982 (#82004272)	6th and C Streets; 47°16′30″N 122°45′51″W	Home	
32	Huckleberry Creek Patrol Cabin		March 13, 1991 (#91000178)	Sunrise; 46°59′41″N 121°37′03″W	Mount Rainier National Park	
33	Indian Bar Trail Shelter	Indian Bar Trail Shelter	March 13, 1991 (#91000179)	Paradise; 46°49′33″N 121°38′19″W	Mount Rainier National Park	
34	Indian Henry's Patrol Cabin	Indian Henry's Patrol Cabin	March 13, 1991 (#91000180)	Longmire; 46°47′39″N 121°50′20″W	Mount Rainier National Park	The structure was stabilized in 1978 with 300 lb (140 kg). footings.
35	Ipsut Creek Patrol Cabin	Ipsut Creek Patrol Cabin	March 13, 1991 (#91000181)	Carbon River Entrance; 46°58′40″N 121°49′54″W	Mount Rainier National Park	
36	Lake George Patrol Cabin	Lake George Patrol Cabin	March 13, 1991 (#91000182)	Longmire; 46°47′36″N 121°54′07″W	Mount Rainier National Park	
37	Lakewold	Lakewold	December 16, 2014 (#14001055)	12317 Gravelly Lake Dr. 47°08′45″N 122°32′19″W	Lakewood	
38	Longbranch School Gymnasium	Longbranch School Gymnasium	September 28, 1987 (#87001164)	Gig Harbor-Longbranch Road; 47°13′05″N 122°45′34″W	Lakebay	Rural Public Schools of Washington State MPS
39	Longmire Buildings	Longmire Buildings	May 28, 1987 (#87001338)	Longmire; 46°45′06″N 121°48′42″W	Mount Rainier National Park	Extends into Lewis County
40	Longmire Historic District	Longmire Historic District	March 13, 1991 (#91000173)	Longmire; 46°44′59″N 121°48′45″W	Mount Rainier National Park	Extends into Lewis County
41	J. H. Lotz House	J. H. Lotz House	March 10, 1980 (#80004401)	1004 2nd Ave., NW; 47°11′34″N 122°18′22″W	Puyallup	
42	McMillin Bridge	McMillin Bridge	July 16, 1982 (#82004275)	Spans Puyallup River on State Route 162; 47°07′49″N 122°14′07″W	McMillin	Also known as the Puyallup River Bridge, the bridge was thought to be the longest concrete truss in the country. Historic Bridges and Tunnels in Washington MPS
43	McMillin School	McMillin School	July 15, 1987 (#87001172)	State Route 162; 47°08′29″N 122°14′05″W	McMillin	This building served as the McMillin School from 1926 to 1963, and now serves as the McMillin Grange. Rural Public Schools of Washington State MPS
44	Midway School	Midway School	July 15, 1987 (#87001166)	5115 Thirty-eighth Ave. NW; 47°18′18″N 122°35′15″W	Gig Harbor	This one-room building functioned as a schoolhouse from when it was built in 1893 until 1941. Rural Public Schools of Washington State MPS; Moved in 2009 to 4121 Harborview Drive.
45	Mt. Fremont Fire Lookout	Mt. Fremont Fire Lookout	March 13, 1991 (#91000193)	Sunrise; 46°56′03″N 121°40′30″W	Mount Rainier National Park	
46	Mount Rainier National Park	Mount Rainier National Park	February 18, 1997 (#97000344)	Longmire; 46°52′59″N 121°53′04″W	Mount Rainier National Park	The park is a National Historic Landmark District, which includes 165 contributing structures and buildings.
47	Mowich Lake Patrol Cabin	Mowich Lake Patrol Cabin	March 13, 1991 (#91000183)	Carbon River Entrance; 46°56′05″N 121°51′40″W	Mount Rainier National Park	
48	Herbert and Barbara Munson House	Herbert and Barbara Munson House	August 27, 2019 (#100004345)	12711 Gravelly Lake Dr. SW; 47°08′37″N 122°31′57″W	Lakewood	
49	Nisqually Entrance Historic District	Nisqually Entrance Historic District	March 13, 1991 (#91000172)	Nisqually Entrance; 46°44′27″N 121°55′09″W	Mount Rainier National Park	
50	North Mowich Trail Shelter		March 13, 1991 (#91000184)	Mowich Lake Entrance; 46°54′55″N 121°53′34″W	Mount Rainier National Park	
51	Old Main	Old Main	January 27, 1984 (#84003570)	Park Avenue, S. and Garfield Street; 47°08′46″N 122°26′21″W	Parkland	Now known as Harstad Hall
52	Nathaniel Orr House and Orchard	Nathaniel Orr House and Orchard	November 21, 1972 (#72001280)	1807 Rainier Street; 47°10′24″N 122°35′42″W	Steilacoom	Also known as Orrmount, when this home was built in 1857, the first included a wagon shop, which was subsequently moved next door.
53	Charles W. Orton House	Charles W. Orton House	July 28, 1983 (#83003350)	7473 Riverside Rd., E 47°11′23″N 122°13′08″W	Sumner	
54	Paradise Historic District	Paradise Historic District	March 13, 1991 (#91000174)	Paradise; 46°47′10″N 121°44′07″W	Mount Rainier National Park	
55	Paradise Inn	Paradise Inn	May 28, 1987 (#87001336)	Paradise; 46°47′13″N 121°43′57″W	Mount Rainier National Park	Opened in 1917, and built in the National Park Service Rustic style of architecture, the Inn was closed in 2005 to undergo major remodeling to conform to safety standards, and scheduled to reopen in 2008.
56	Parkland Lutheran Children's Home	Parkland Lutheran Children's Home	August 7, 1996 (#96000838)	12123 A Street; 47°08′40″N 122°25′48″W	Parkland	
57	Purdy Bridge	Purdy Bridge	July 16, 1982 (#82004274)	Spans Henderson Bay; 47°23′03″N 122°37′41″W	Purdy	Historic Bridges and Tunnels in Washington TR
58	Puyallup Fish Hatchery	Puyallup Fish Hatchery	January 2, 2013 (#12001139)	1416 14th St., SW. 47°10′40″N 122°18′50″W	Puyallup	
59	Red Shield Inn	Red Shield Inn	February 14, 1979 (#79002552)	Main Street; 47°05′50″N 122°36′02″W	Fort Lewis	Now housing the Fort Lewis Military Museum, the 150-room building was originally built in 1919 by the Salvation Army.
60	Rhodesleigh	Rhodesleigh	January 27, 1983 (#83003352)	10815 Greendale Dr., SW; 47°09′34″N 122°32′03″W	Lakewood	Built in 1922
61	Ryan House	Ryan House	June 30, 1976 (#76001900)	1228 Main Street; 47°12′12″N 122°14′19″W	Sumner	Originally a one-room cabin built in the 1860s, Sumner's first mayor added onto the house in 1875 and 1885. The building housed the Sumner Public Library from 1926 to 1979, and now houses the Sumner Historical Society.
62	St. Andrews Creek Bridge	St. Andrews Creek Bridge	March 13, 1991 (#91000199)	Nisqually Entrance; 46°50′10″N 121°54′15″W	Mount Rainier National Park	Built in 1931.
63	St. Andrews Patrol Cabin	St. Andrews Patrol Cabin	March 13, 1991 (#91000188)	Nisqually Entrance; 46°50′10″N 121°54′10″W	Mount Rainier National Park	
64	Sequalitchew Archeological Site	Sequalitchew Archeological Site	February 14, 1979 (#79002551)	Address restricted.	Dupont	
65	Shriner Peak Fire Lookout	Shriner Peak Fire Lookout	March 13, 1991 (#91000194)	Ohanapecosh; 46°48′50″N 121°31′46″W	Mount Rainier National Park	
66	Silver Creek Ranger Station	Silver Creek Ranger Station	June 7, 1991 (#91000707)	State Route 410 on eastern border of Mt. Rainier National Park; 46°59′21″N 121°32′04″W	Crystal Mountain	Also known as Silver Creek Work Center.
67	Andrew and Bertha Skansie Net Shed and House	Andrew and Bertha Skansie Net Shed and House	August 31, 2011 (#11000627)	3207 Harborview Dr. 47°19′51″N 122°34′52″W	Gig Harbor	Owned by the City of Gig Harbor.
68	Peter Smith Farm-Donation Land Claim	Peter Smith Farm-Donation Land Claim	March 9, 1995 (#95000194)	12504 Spanaway Loop Road; 47°08′38″N 122°27′35″W	Parkland	Also known as Lakeview Dairy and Schibig Farm.
69	South Puyallup River Bridge	South Puyallup River Bridge	March 13, 1991 (#91000198)	Nisqually Entrance; 46°48′29″N 121°53′26″W	Mount Rainier National Park	Built in 1931.
70	Steilacoom Catholic Church	Steilacoom Catholic Church	July 30, 1974 (#74001972)	1810 Nisqually Street; 47°10′16″N 122°35′37″W	Steilacoom	Also known as the Church of the Immaculate Conception, this church was originally built in 1855 near Fort Steilacoom, but was moved to its present location in Steilacoom in 1864. It was the first Catholic church built in Washington.
71	Steilacoom Historic District	Steilacoom Historic District	November 24, 1975 (#75001865)	Between Nisqually Street and Puget Sound. 47°10′18″N 122°35′56″W	Steilacoom	Steilacoom was the first incorporated community in Washington in 1853. The Historic District consists of 1,500 acres (6.1 km^{2}) and 38 buildings.
72	Summerland Trail Shelter	Summerland Trail Shelter	March 13, 1991 (#91000185)	Sunrise; 46°51′55″N 121°39′28″W	Mount Rainier National Park	
73	Sunrise Comfort Station		March 13, 1991 (#91000207)	Sunrise; 46°54′40″N 121°39′32″W	Mount Rainier National Park	
74	Sunrise Historic District	Sunrise Historic District	March 13, 1991 (#91000175)	Sunrise; 46°54′53″N 121°38′32″W	Mount Rainier National Park	
75	Sunset Park Patrol Cabin	Sunset Park Patrol Cabin	March 13, 1991 (#91000186)	Mowich Lake Entrance; 46°52′58″N 121°53′54″W	Mount Rainier National Park	
76	Sunset Park Trail Shelter		March 13, 1991 (#91000187)	Mowich Lake Entrance; 46°52′59″N 121°53′49″W	Mount Rainier National Park	
77	Suntop Lookout	Suntop Lookout	July 14, 1987 (#87001192)	White River Ranger District on Suntop Mountain. 47°02′29″N 121°35′37″W	Enumclaw	Built in 1933, this fire lookout was also used in the Army Aircraft Warning Service during World War II.
78	Tahoma Vista Comfort Station		March 13, 1991 (#91000205)	Nisqually Entrance; 46°47′43″N 121°52′51″W	Mount Rainier National Park	
79	Thornewood	Thornewood	March 18, 1982 (#82004283)	8601 and 8307 N. Thorne Lane, SW and 4 Thornewood Lane, SW; 47°07′47″N 122°32′54″W	Lakewood	Consists of three buildings, including Thornewood Castle, which was built from the brick of a dismantled 15th century house imported from England. The Castle was used as a set for the Stephen King film Rose Red.
80	Tipsoo Lake Comfort Station	Tipsoo Lake Comfort Station	March 13, 1991 (#91000206)	Chinook Pass; 46°52′13″N 121°31′09″W	Mount Rainier National Park	
81	Tolmie Peak Fire Lookout	Tolmie Peak Fire Lookout	March 13, 1991 (#91000195)	Mowich Lake Entrance; 46°57′28″N 121°52′49″W	Mount Rainier National Park	
82	Walker Cut Stone Company	Walker Cut Stone Company	June 7, 1978 (#78002770)	East of Wilkeson; 47°06′15″N 122°01′54″W	Wilkeson	District consists of 400 acres (1.6 km^{2}), two buildings, five structures, and eight objects.
83	White River Bridge	White River Bridge	March 13, 1991 (#91000200)	White River Entrance; 46°53′53″N 121°37′04″W	Mount Rainier National Park	
84	White River Entrance	White River Entrance	March 13, 1991 (#91000177)	White River Entrance; 46°54′08″N 121°33′14″W	Mount Rainier National Park	District consists of 49 acres (20 ha) and three buildings.
85	White River Mess Hall and Dormitory	White River Mess Hall and Dormitory	March 13, 1991 (#91000328)	White River Entrance; 46°54′08″N 121°33′16″W	Mount Rainier National Park	
86	White River Patrol Cabin	White River Patrol Cabin	March 13, 1991 (#91000190)	White River Entrance; 46°54′10″N 121°38′15″W	Mount Rainier National Park	
87	Wilkeson Arch	Wilkeson Arch	August 10, 2000 (#00000973)	State Route 165, Church St. and Brierhill Blvd. 47°06′38″N 122°03′03″W	Wilkeson	Built in 1925 by the town booster club, the arch was damaged in the 2001 Nisqually earthquake.
88	Wilkeson Community House	Wilkeson Community House	July 17, 2013 (#13000507)	540 Church St. 47°06′15″N 122°02′46″W	Wilkeson	
89	Wilkeson School	Wilkeson School	October 8, 1976 (#76001905)	640 Railroad Ave. 47°06′06″N 122°02′33″W	Wilkeson	Also known as Wilkeson Elementary School, it is the oldest used elementary school in Washington.
90	Herbert Williams House	Herbert Williams House	October 18, 1984 (#84000172)	1711 Elm Street; 47°12′39″N 122°13′51″W	Sumner	Also known as Perfield House.
91	Sidney Williams House	Sidney Williams House	October 18, 1984 (#84000179)	15003 E. Elm Street; 47°12′40″N 122°13′44″W	Sumner	Also known as the Moser House.
92	Winnifred Street Bridge	Winnifred Street Bridge	March 28, 1995 (#95000259)	Winnifred St. over the Burlington Northern RR tracks. 47°17′52″N 122°30′43″W	Ruston	Originally built in 1941, it was rebuilt in 2003. Bridges of Washington State MPS
93	Wollochet-Point Fosdick School		July 15, 1987 (#87001168)	3409 E. Bay Drive; 47°16′08″N 122°34′59″W	Gig Harbor	Was used as a private residence until it burned to the ground in a wood stove accident. Building is no longer in existence. Address listed is of the property owner, not the location of the school property. Lat-long listed are correct for the school property. Rural Public Schools of Washington State MPS
94	Woodbrook Hunt Club	Woodbrook Hunt Club	August 29, 1997 (#97001083)	6122 150th St. SW; 47°07′11″N 122°31′17″W	Lakewood	Established in 1924.
95	Woolrey–Koehler Hop Kiln	Woolrey–Koehler Hop Kiln	October 13, 1983 (#83004260)	176th Street, E. (Leach Rd.); 47°05′52″N 122°13′27″W	Orting vicinity	Building no longer exists.
96	Yakima Park Stockade Group	Yakima Park Stockade Group	May 28, 1987 (#87001337)	Sunrise (Yakima Park); 46°54′49″N 121°38′32″W	Mount Rainier National Park	Founded c. 1935, the district consists of 35 acres (14 ha), three buildings, one structure, and one object.

=== Tacoma ===
	Name on the Register	Image	Date listed	Location	Neighborhood	Description
1	Adjutant General's Residence		May 1, 1991 (#91000537)	Camp Murray; 47°06′59″N 122°33′51″W	Camp Murray	Also known as Building 118, once housed the Washington National Guard Museum.
2	Albers Brothers Mill	Albers Brothers Mill	March 19, 2002 (#02000247)	1821 Dock Street; 47°14′42″N 122°26′01″W		Built in 1904, with additions in 1912, this building served as a mill until 1944. Now houses apartments.
3	American Lake Veterans Hospital	American Lake Veterans Hospital	May 19, 2009 (#09000218)	9600 Veterans Dr. SW; 47°08′04″N 122°34′40″W		
4	Annobee Apartments	Annobee Apartments	July 28, 1999 (#99000919)	319–323 North I Street; 47°15′41″N 122°27′14″W		This Italianate style building was built in 1925.
5	Nettie J. and Henry J. Asberry House	Nettie J. and Henry J. Asberry House	October 31, 2024 (#100010930)	1219 South 13th Street; 47°14′59″N 122°27′14″W		
6	Auditorium Dance Hall	Auditorium Dance Hall	January 23, 2008 (#07001458)	1308–1310 Fawcett Avenue; 47°15′02″N 122°26′33″W		Also known as the Crescent Ballroom, the auditorium was built in 1922 by architect Roland E. Borhek, and held concerts ranging from Rudolph Valentino in 1923, to Nirvana in 1990.
7	Balfour Dock Building	Balfour Dock Building	November 16, 2006 (#06001214)	705 Dock Street; 47°15′28″N 122°26′14″W		The building was built in 1900, and is home to the Working Waterfront Maritime Museum.
8	Conrad F. & Annie K. Beutel House	Conrad F. & Annie K. Beutel House	June 15, 2007 (#07001459)	701 N. 10th 47°16′04″N 122°27′42″W		Built in 1909.
9	Blue Mouse Theatre	Blue Mouse Theatre	January 13, 2010 (#09001235)	2611 N. Proctor St. 47°16′18″N 122°29′19″W		
10	Bowes Building	Bowes Building	November 23, 1979 (#79002553)	100 S. 9th Street; 47°15′20″N 122°26′15″W		Built in 1919.
11	Browns Point Lighthouse & Keeper's Cottage	Browns Point Lighthouse & Keeper's Cottage	March 29, 1989 (#89000208)	201 Tulalip, NE. 47°18′22″N 122°26′33″W		Built in 1933
12	Buckley's Addition Historic District	Buckley's Addition Historic District	December 20, 2016 (#16000882)	Roughly bounded by N. Steele, N. 8th, N. Pine & N. 21st Sts. 47°15′40″N 122°28′15″W		
13	Building at 1602 South G Street	Building at 1602 South G Street	March 16, 1995 (#95000222)	1602 S. G St. 47°14′51″N 122°26′38″W		Built in 1890, this building was originally built as the Hillside Grocery. Destroyed by fire in 2009.
14	Building at 712–716 Sixth Avenue	Building at 712–716 Sixth Avenue	March 16, 1995 (#95000226)	712–716 6th Ave. 47°15′27″N 122°26′45″W		Built in 1925, the building originally housed three separate business, the Hob Nob Restaurant now occupies the entire building.
15	Cabin No. 97	Cabin No. 97	December 13, 1977 (#77001354)	Northwest of Tacoma on Salmon Beach; 47°17′37″N 122°31′44″W	Salmon Beach	Also known as Walter Crooks Cabin.
16	Camp Six	Camp Six	March 7, 1973 (#73001885)	Point Defiance Park; 47°18′12″N 122°31′38″W	Point Defiance Park	Also known as Western Washington Forest Industries Museum, the museum is designed to look like an actual logging camp.
17	Central Elementary School	Central Elementary School	December 24, 2013 (#13000998)	601 S. 8th St. 47°15′21″N 122°26′44″W		Now home to Tacoma Public Schools headquarters
18	City Waterway Bridge	City Waterway Bridge	July 16, 1982 (#82004278)	11th Avenue, spans Thea Foss Waterway. 47°15′14″N 122°25′57″W		Built in 1911, it is also known as Murray Morgan Bridge. Historic Bridges and Tunnels in Washington TR
19	The Coffee Pot Restaurant	The Coffee Pot Restaurant	April 21, 2014 (#14000167)	2101 S. Tacoma Way; 47°13′55″N 122°27′52″W		Now known as Bob's Java Jive
20	College Park Historic District	College Park Historic District	October 10, 2017 (#100001723)	Roughly bounded by N. Union Ave., N. Pine, N. 21st, N. Alder, N. 8th & N. 18th Sts. 47°15′46″N 122°28′32″W		
21	Cushman Substation	Cushman Substation	December 29, 2014 (#14001108)	3713 N. 19th St. 47°16′00″N 122°29′13″W		
22	Henry Drum House	Henry Drum House	July 20, 1977 (#77001351)	9 St. Helens Street; 47°15′49″N 122°26′41″W		Built in 1888.
23	East 34th Street Bridge	East 34th Street Bridge	July 16, 1982 (#82004279)	East 34th Street from Pacific Avenue to A Street; 47°14′19″N 122°25′55″W		Built in 1937. Historic Bridges and Tunnels in Washington TR
24	Engine House No. 4	Engine House No. 4	October 18, 1984 (#84002425)	220–224 E. 26th Street; 47°14′19″N 122°25′45″W		Built in 1911. No longer in service as a fire station, today it is used by the City of Tacoma's traffic signal division.
25	Engine House No. 8	Engine House No. 8	May 2, 1986 (#86000968)	4301 S. L St; 47°13′06″N 122°26′52″W		Built in 1909. This station was replaced in 2006 with a larger facility, and is now a private residence.
26	Engine House No. 9	Engine House No. 9	July 30, 1975 (#75001866)	611 N. Pine Street; 47°15′23″N 122°28′20″W		Built in 1907. This station was replaced in the 1960s with a larger facility, and is now a private fire service-themed bar and grill.
27	Engine House No. 11	Engine House No. 11	May 2, 1986 (#86000965)	3802 McKinley Avenue; 47°13′23″N 122°25′11″W		Built in 1909, this is still an active fire station.
28	Engine House No. 13	Engine House No. 13	May 2, 1986 (#86000964)	3825 N. Twenty-fifth Street; 47°16′14″N 122°29′15″W		Built in 1907, this is still an active fire station.
29	Fire Alarm Station	Fire Alarm Station	May 2, 1986 (#86000980)	415 S. Tacoma Avenue; 47°15′34″N 122°26′41″W		Built in 1928, this facility is still as the fire alarm dispatch center today.
30	Fire Station No. 1	Fire Station No. 1	May 2, 1986 (#86000974)	425 S. Tacoma Avenue; 47°15′32″N 122°26′40″W		Built in 1919, this building has not served as a fire station in decades, but is still owned by the fire department and used for storage purposes. It is adjacent to the Fire Alarm Station.
31	Fire Station No. 2	Fire Station No. 2	May 2, 1986 (#86000972)	2701 S. Tacoma Avenue; 47°14′11″N 122°26′21″W		Built in 1907 and heavily remodeled in 1935, this is still an active fire station.
32	Fire Station No. 5	Fire Station No. 5	May 2, 1986 (#86000971)	1453 S. 12th Street; 47°15′03″N 122°27′19″W		Built in 1935, this is still an active fire station. It was renumbered as Fire Station No. 4 when the previous station 4 was closed.
33	Fire Station No. 10	Fire Station No. 10	May 2, 1986 (#86000966)	7247 S. Park Avenue; 47°11′26″N 122°26′25″W		Built in 1928, this is still an active fire station..
34	Fire Station No. 14	Fire Station No. 14	May 2, 1986 (#86000962)	4701 N. 41st Street; 47°17′10″N 122°29′56″W		Built in 1928, this is still an active fire station..
35	Fire Station No. 15	Fire Station No. 15	May 2, 1986 (#86000961)	3510 E. 11th Street; 47°16′31″N 122°23′47″W		This Mediterranean style fire station, built in 1928, was closed in 2006 when Engine 15 was relocated to southeast Tacoma. The building is still owned by the Fire Department and is used for storage.
36	Fireboat No.1	Fireboat No.1	December 2, 1983 (#83004254)	Marine Park on Ruston Way; 47°17′20″N 122°29′22″W		Built in 1929, retired from active duty in 1985.
37	Fireboat Station	Fireboat Station	May 2, 1986 (#86000978)	302 E. 11th Street; 47°15′16″N 122°25′51″W		Built in 1928 as part of a project that built three other stations, as well as the Fire Alarm Station. While the fireboats are still housed here, the station itself is no longer staffed.
38	Fort Nisqually Granary and Factor's House	Fort Nisqually Granary and Factor's House	April 15, 1970 (#70000647)	Point Defiance Park; 47°18′13″N 122°31′58″W	Point Defiance Park	Both buildings have been moved to Point Defiance Park, and a replica of the original Fort Nisqually as a living museum.
39	Ray Gibson Caballeros Club		November 2, 2026 (#100013563)	1516 S 28th Street; 47°14′07″N 122°27′13″W		
40	Haddaway Hall	Haddaway Hall	January 27, 1983 (#83003349)	4301 N. Stevens; 47°17′17″N 122°29′39″W		Originally built in 1922, for John Weyerhauser and his wife, the building now houses a Baptist seminary.
41	House at 1510 Tacoma Avenue South	House at 1510 Tacoma Avenue South	March 10, 1995 (#95000230)	1510 Tacoma Ave., S. 47°14′53″N 122°26′32″W		This Queen Anne Style home was built in 1902. It has since been subdivided to accommodate two residences.
42	House at 1610 South G Street	House at 1610 South G Street	March 10, 1995 (#95000223)	1610 S. G St. 47°14′50″N 122°26′38″W		Built in 1911, this house once served as the rectory for the Japanese Methodist Church on the same block.
43	House at 2314 South Ainsworth Avenue	House at 2314 South Ainsworth Avenue	March 10, 1995 (#95000220)	2314 S. Ainsworth Ave. 47°14′21″N 122°27′18″W		Built in 1926.
44	House at 2326 South L Street	House at 2326 South L Street	March 10, 1995 (#95000225)	2326 S. L St. 47°14′17″N 122°26′56″W		Built in 1904.
45	House at 605 South G Street	House at 605 South G Street	March 10, 1995 (#95000221)	605 S. G St. 47°15′28″N 122°26′44″W		A Stick Style home built in 1906, also called the James Agnew Residence.
46	House at 708–710 South 8th Street	House at 708–710 South 8th Street	March 10, 1995 (#95000224)	708 S. 8th St. 47°15′19″N 122°26′53″W		Built in 1908, it is also known as the Buren/Holden Apartments
47	House at 802–804 South G Street	House at 802–804 South G Street	March 10, 1995 (#95000229)	802–804 S. G St. 47°15′20″N 122°26′45″W		Built in 1890, it is also known as the Thomas Carroll Double House.
48	MV Kalakala (ferry)	MV Kalakala (ferry)	March 22, 2006 (#06000177)	Hylebos Creek Waterway, 1801 Taylor Way; 47°16′31″N 122°23′12″W		Built in 1926, it is an Art Deco styled ferry that served the Washington State Ferry System from 1935 to 1967.
49	Lord-Heuston House	Lord-Heuston House	November 2, 2007 (#07001385)	2902 N. Cedar Street; 47°16′26″N 122°28′34″W		NRHP ID# 07001385
50	C. O. Lynn, Co. Funeral Home	C. O. Lynn, Co. Funeral Home	November 30, 2005 (#05001352)	717 Tacoma Ave. S 47°15′29″N 122°26′42″W		This Classical Revival building, built in 1918, served as a funeral home until 2004.
51	Manley-Thompson Ford Agency	Manley-Thompson Ford Agency	November 2, 2007 (#07001386)	1302–1306 S. Fawcett Avenue; 47°15′02″N 122°26′33″W		Built in 1918, in 1942 the building was merged with the next door Auditorium Dance Hall to form a single venue.
52	Masonic Temple Building-Temple Theater	Masonic Temple Building-Temple Theater	April 29, 1993 (#93000357)	47 St. Helens Avenue; 47°15′43″N 122°26′39″W		Built in 1927, this Art Deco building houses Washington's largest dancefloor.
53	McChord Field Historic District	McChord Field Historic District	December 12, 2008 (#08001026)	McChord Air Force Base; 47°08′24″N 122°28′45″W		
54	McIlvaine Apartments	McIlvaine Apartments	March 16, 1995 (#95000227)	920 S. 9th Street; 47°15′15″N 122°27′02″W		Built in 1909.
55	Frederick H. Murray House	Frederick H. Murray House	August 23, 1985 (#85001810)	402 N. Sheridan Avenue; 47°15′32″N 122°27′25″W		Built in 1902, this Gothic style home became an alcoholism treatment center in the 1930s. It is now apartments.
56	National Bank of Tacoma	National Bank of Tacoma	August 2, 2006 (#06000671)	1123 Pacific Ave; 47°15′11″N 122°26′19″W		Built in 1922, the building is now home to the Tacoma Art Museum.
57	Nihon Go Gakko	Nihon Go Gakko	August 30, 1984 (#84003568)	1715 S. Tacoma Ave. 47°14′52″N 122°26′30″W		Also known as the Japanese Language School, the building was built in 1922, and used to gather Japanese residents during World War II, before sending them to internment camps. The building was demolished in 2004 after standing vacant since the 1940s.
58	Nisqually Power Substation	Nisqually Power Substation	April 25, 2001 (#01000429)	2416 S. C Street; 47°14′21″N 122°26′10″W		Built in 1911.
59	North 21st Street Bridge	North 21st Street Bridge	July 16, 1982 (#82004280)	Spans Buckley Gulch, N. Fife and Oakes; 47°16′03″N 122°28′11″W		Built in 1910. Historic Bridges and Tunnels in Washington TR
60	North 23rd Street Bridge	North 23rd Street Bridge	July 16, 1982 (#82004281)	Spans Buckley Gulch, N. Fife and Oakes; 47°16′40″N 122°28′14″W		Built in 1909. Historic Bridges and Tunnels in Washington TR
61	North Slope Historic District	North Slope Historic District	March 28, 2003 (#03000160)	Area bounded by Division Ave., N. Grant Ave, N. Steele St., and N. I St. 47°15′41″N 122°27′45″W		Consists of 2,280 acres (9.2 km^{2}), 698 buildings, and 211 structures.
62	Northern Pacific Office Building	Northern Pacific Office Building	May 4, 1976 (#76001901)	Northeastern corner of 7th St. and Pacific Ave. 47°15′27″N 122°26′17″W		Built in 1891, part of the building was demolished and turned into a park in 1920, when Northern Pacific's offices were transferred to Seattle.
63	Old City Hall	Old City Hall	May 17, 1974 (#74001973)	7th Avenue between Commerce and Pacific Avenue; 47°15′27″N 122°26′19″W		This Renaissance style building, designed by E.A. Hatherton, served as Tacoma's City Hall from 1893 to 1959.
64	Old City Hall Historic District	Old City Hall Historic District	December 23, 1977 (#77001352)	Roughly bounded by St. Helens Ave., Court C, freeway spur, 7th and 9th Streets. 47°15′22″N 122°26′30″W		Consists of 165 acres (0.67 km^{2}), 20 buildings, and one structure.
65	Pacific Brewing and Malting Company	Pacific Brewing and Malting Company	July 31, 1978 (#78002768)	S. 25th St. between C St. and Jefferson Avenue; 47°14′18″N 122°26′11″W		Founded in 1888, the brewery closed in 1916, after Washington passed laws prohibiting alcohol. The site consists of thirteen buildings.
66	Pacific National Bank Building	Pacific National Bank Building	March 7, 1980 (#80004008)	1302 Pacific Avenue; 47°15′05″N 122°26′12″W		Built in 1891, the building by Burnham and Root was also known as the Luzon Building. Demolished September 2009.
67	Pantages Theatre	Pantages Theatre	November 7, 1976 (#76001902)	901 and 909 Broadway; 47°15′19″N 122°26′22″W		Built in 1916, it is the oldest remaining of several theaters built for Alexander Pantages.
68	Perkins Building	Perkins Building	November 22, 2000 (#00001444)	1101 A Street; 47°15′46″N 122°26′05″W		Built in 1907.
69	Point Defiance Lodge	Point Defiance Lodge	August 28, 2017 (#100001518)	5715 Roberts Garden Rd. 47°18′18″N 122°31′02″W	Point Defiance Park	
70	Point Defiance Streetcar Station	Point Defiance Streetcar Station	January 8, 2014 (#13001060)	5801 Trolley Lane; 47°18′21″N 122°31′02″W	Point Defiance Park	
71	Pythian Temple	Pythian Temple	August 23, 1985 (#85001811)	924–926½ Broadway; 47°15′17″N 122°26′23″W		Built in 1906.
72	Rhodes Medical Arts Building	Rhodes Medical Arts Building	November 21, 1978 (#78002769)	740 St. Helens Avenue; 47°15′22″N 122°26′26″W		Built in 1930, this Art Deco building now houses the Tacoma City Hall.
73	Henry A. and Birdella Rhodes House	Henry A. and Birdella Rhodes House	August 2, 2006 (#06000670)	701 North J Street; 47°15′49″N 122°27′34″W		This Queen Anne Style home was built in 1901.
74	Rialto Theater	Rialto Theater	August 21, 1992 (#92001041)	310 9th Street; 47°15′18″N 122°26′24″W		Built in 1918, this is a Beaux-Arts style theater.
75	William Ross Rust House	William Ross Rust House	August 23, 1985 (#85001806)	1001 N. I Street; 47°15′59″N 122°27′41″W		Built in 1905 for William Ross Rust, then President of the Tacoma Smelter and Refining Company.
76	St. Peter's Episcopal Church	St. Peter's Episcopal Church	November 5, 1974 (#74001974)	Starr between 29th and 30th Streets; 47°16′28″N 122°27′45″W		Built in 1873, it is the oldest building in Tacoma.
77	Sandberg-Schoenfeld Buildings	Sandberg-Schoenfeld Buildings	August 12, 1999 (#99001008)	1411–1423 Pacific Avenue; 47°14′57″N 122°28′35″W		Built in 1907.
78	Schultz Apartments	Schultz Apartments	March 16, 1995 (#95000228)	1002 S. 12th Street; 47°15′04″N 122°26′57″W		Built in 1911.
79	Slavonian Hall	Slavonian Hall	November 7, 1976 (#76001903)	2306 N. 30th Street; 47°16′28″N 122°28′00″W		Built in 1901, as a fraternal lodge by the Slavonian Benevolent Society.
80	South J Street Historic District	South J Street Historic District	May 8, 1986 (#86001020)	Area bounded by west side of S. J St. between S. Seventh and S. Eighth Streets; 47°15′21″N 122°27′04″W		Includes less than 1-acre (4,000 m^{2}), and eight buildings, seven of which are in the Queene Anne style.
81	Sprague Building	Sprague Building	November 21, 1985 (#85002920)	1501–1505 Pacific Avenue; 47°14′57″N 122°26′09″W		Built in 1889.
82	Stadium-Seminary Historic District	Stadium-Seminary Historic District	May 26, 1977 (#77001353)	Roughly bounded by 1st, I, and 10th Streets and shoreline. 47°16′02″N 122°27′18″W		Encompasses 2,000 acres (8.1 km^{2}) and 402 buildings.
83	Sunset Telephone & Telegraph Building	Sunset Telephone & Telegraph Building	August 23, 1985 (#85001809)	1101 Fawcett Avenue; 47°15′11″N 122°26′28″W		Built in 1901.
84	Tacoma Building	Tacoma Building	October 22, 2001 (#01001162)	1015–1021 A Street; 47°15′46″N 122°26′05″W		Also known as the Weyerhaeuser Headquarters Building.
85	Tacoma Ice Company's Cold Storage Plant	Tacoma Ice Company's Cold Storage Plant	December 7, 2010 (#10000994)	2602 S. Holgate St. 47°14′16″N 122°26′15″W		
86	Tacoma Mausoleum	Tacoma Mausoleum	April 21, 2000 (#00000405)	5302 S. Junett Street; 47°12′33″N 122°28′28″W		Built in 1910.
87	Tacoma Narrows Bridge Ruins	Tacoma Narrows Bridge Ruins	August 31, 1992 (#92001068)	State Route 16 over the Tacoma Narrows; 47°16′02″N 122°33′02″W	Tacoma Narrows	Built in 1940, but collapsed just four months later during a windstorm.
88	U.S. Post Office – Tacoma Downtown Station – Federal Building	U.S. Post Office – Tacoma Downtown Station – Federal Building	May 30, 1991 (#91000657)	1102 S. A Street; 47°15′11″N 122°26′10″W		Built in 1910.
89	Union Depot – Warehouse Historic District	Union Depot – Warehouse Historic District	April 2, 1980 (#80004009)	Roughly bounded by railroad tracks, 15th, 23rd and Market Streets; 47°14′43″N 122°26′17″W		Consists of 26.5 acres (10.7 ha) and 34 buildings. The building shown here is The Swiss.
90	Union Passenger Station	Union Passenger Station	March 15, 1974 (#74001975)	1713 Pacific Avenue; 47°14′45″N 122°26′11″W		The station was completed in 1911 from a design by Reed and Stem, the same architects that designed Grand Central Station in New York City.
91	Walker Apartment Hotel	Walker Apartment Hotel	May 16, 1994 (#94000420)	405 6th Avenue; 47°15′31″N 122°26′32″W		Built in 1927.
92	Washington Building	Washington Building	June 29, 2009 (#09000508)	1019 Pacific Ave. 47°15′13″N 122°26′18″W		
93	Washington School	Washington School	August 23, 2006 (#06000729)	3701 N. 26th Street; 47°16′16″N 122°29′12″W		Also known as Washington-Hoyt Elementary School.
94	Wedge Historic District	Wedge Historic District	December 13, 2016 (#16000856)	Triangle area bounded by Division and 6th Aves., and South M St. 47°15′33″N 122°27′33″W		
95	Whitman Elementary School	Whitman Elementary School	December 26, 2012 (#12001100)	1120 S. 39th St. 47°13′18″N 122°26′54″W		
96	Wright Park and Seymour Conservatory	Wright Park and Seymour Conservatory	October 8, 1976 (#76001904)	Division Ave. to 6th Ave., between S. G and I Street; 47°15′37″N 122°26′57″W		Wright Park was established in 1886, the conservatory was added in 1907.
97	Y. M. C. A. Building	Y. M. C. A. Building	January 27, 1983 (#83003353)	714 Market Street; 47°15′26″N 122°26′29″W		Built in 1908.
98	John F. Yuncker House	John F. Yuncker House	August 23, 1985 (#85001807)	519 S. G Street; 47°15′31″N 122°26′45″W		Built in 1888.

== Former listings ==
	Name on the Register	Image	Date listed	Date removed	Location	City or town	Description
1	North 4th and Dock Street Bridge	North 4th and Dock Street Bridge	July 16, 1982 (#82004282)	March 13, 1984	Dock Street	Tacoma	Delisted due to procedural error during nomination.
2	Pacific Avenue Historic District	Pacific Avenue Historic District	April 14, 1983 (#83003351)	July 16, 1990	1302–1356 Pacific Ave.	Tacoma	
3	Samson Hotel		February 18, 1975 (#75001867)	July 16, 1990	1156 S. Fawcett St.	Tacoma	
4	Tacoma Light and Water Company Purifier Building		June 18, 1975 (#75002147)	December 13, 1976	2203 S. A St.	Tacoma	Demolished for construction of Interstate 705.

== See also ==
- List of National Historic Landmarks in Washington
- National Register of Historic Places listings in Washington state

== Sources ==
- Coulombe, Charles A. (2005). Haunted Castles of the World: Ghostly Legends and Phenomena from Keeps and Fortresses Around the Globe. Globe Pequot. ISBN 1-59228-534-1.
- Dunkelberger, Steve; Neary, Walter (2005). Lakewood. Arcadia. ISBN 0-7385-3045-X.
- Filley, Bette (1996). The Big Fact Book About Mount Rainier. Dunamis House. ISBN 1-880405-06-7.
- Galentine, Elizabeth (2006). Anderson Island. Arcadia. ISBN 0-7385-4854-5.
- Grau, Robert (1910). The Business Man in the Amusement World: A Volume of Progress in the Field of the Theatre. Broadway Publishing Co.
- Halliday, Jan; Chehak, Gail (2000). Native Peoples of the Northwest: A Traveler's Guide to Land, Art, and Culture. Sasquatch Books. ISBN 1-57061-241-2.
- Holstine, Craig; Hobbs, Richard (2005). Spanning Washington: Historic Highway Bridges of the Evergreen State. Washington State University Press. ISBN 0-87422-281-8.
- Kirk, Ruth; Alexander, Carmela (1995). Exploring Washington's Past: A Road Guide to History. University of Washington Press. ISBN 0-295-97443-5.
- Price, Lori; Anderson, Ruth (2002). Puyallup: A Pioneer Paradise. Arcadia. ISBN 0-7385-2374-7.
- Roberts, George; Roberts, Jan (1999). Discover Historic Washington State. Gem Guides. ISBN 1-889786-07-1.
- Samson, Karl (2006). Frommer's Washington State. Frommer's. ISBN 0-470-03684-2.
- Smith, Giselle (2004). Best Places Northwest: The Best Restaurants, Lodgings, and a Complete Guide to the Region, Sasquatch Books, ISBN 1-57061-417-2.
- Wootton, Sharon; Savage, Maggie (2007). You Know You're in Washington When...: 101 Quintessential Places, People, Events, Customs, Lingo, and Eats of the Evergreen State. Globe Pequot. ISBN 0-7627-4301-8.
