= Fire Station No. 14 =

Fire Station No. 14, and variations such as Engine House No. 14, may refer to:

- Fire Station No. 14 (Los Angeles, California), historic all-black segregated fire station
- Fire Station No. 14 (Denver, Colorado), a Denver Landmark
- Houston Heights Fire Station, Houston, Texas, known also as "Fire Station 14"
- Fire Station No. 14 (Tacoma, Washington)

== See also ==
- List of fire stations
