= Fire Station No. 15 =

Fire Station No. 15, and variations such as Engine House No. 10, may refer to:

- Fire Station No. 15 (Birmingham, Alabama)
- Fire Station No. 15 (Denver, Colorado), a Denver Landmark
- Fire Station No. 15 (Tacoma, Washington)

== See also ==
- List of fire stations
