= McMillin School =

- U.S. National Register of Historic Places
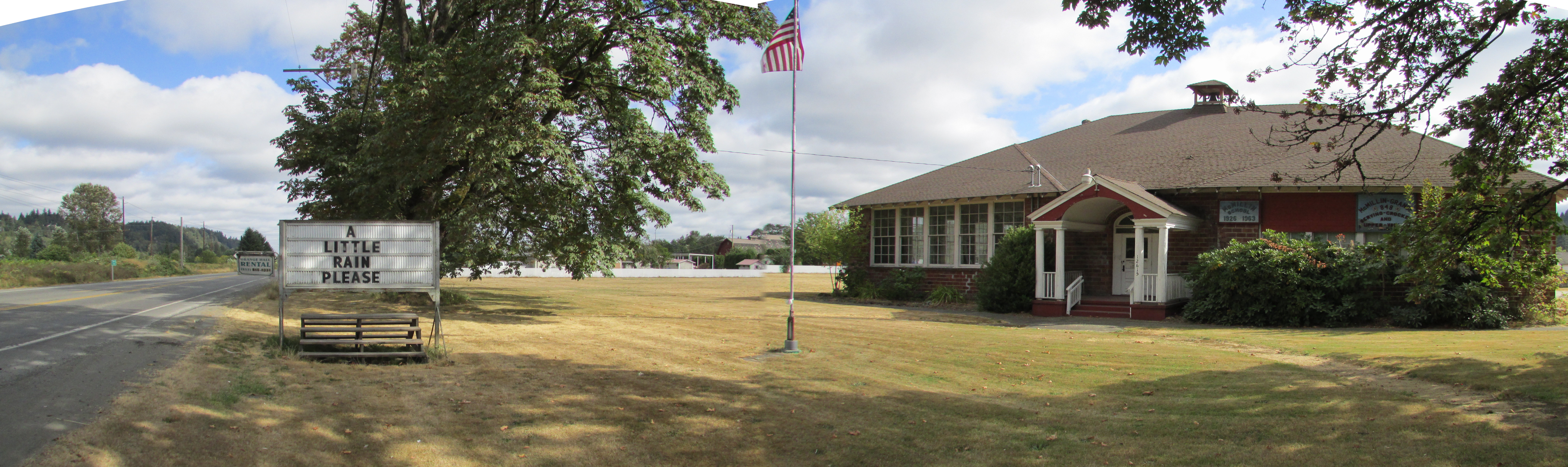
- McMillin School, 1922-1963

- Location within Washington (state) Location within the United States
- Location: WA 162, McMillin, Washington
- Coordinates: 47°08′29″N 122°14′05″W
- Area: less than one acre
- Architectural style: Hipped roof vernacular
- MPS: Rural Public Schools of Washington State MPS
- NRHP reference No.: 87001172
- Added to NRHP: July 15, 1987

The McMillin School is a historic school building in McMillin, Washington, United States. It was constructed in 1922 to replace a frame one-room schoolhouse and served the area until 1960. It is the only remaining structure from the community of McMillin. Along with the Alderton School, they are the last of the rural public schools in central Pierce County. The McMillin School remains in its original location in a setting similar to that of its active years. The building itself has not been changed and the materials reflect a rural public school of the early 20th century.

== History ==
During American settlement of Pierce County in the mid-to-late 19th century, small school districts were established for local communities. School buildings were usually the first and only public buildings in these communities, where they also served as social and cultural centers. Shortly after initial settlement, a one-room log, or frame schoolhouse was constructed on land usually donated by an early homesteader. These buildings were later replaced with larger schools, particularly those built by the Works Progress Administration during the 1930s.

== Bibliography ==
- Bonney, William Pierce, History of Pierce County, Chicago, Illinois; 1927.
- W.P.A. Writers Project Papers, Washington State Historical Society, Tacoma.
