= Fire Station No. 2 (Tacoma, Washington) =

- U.S. National Register of Historic Places
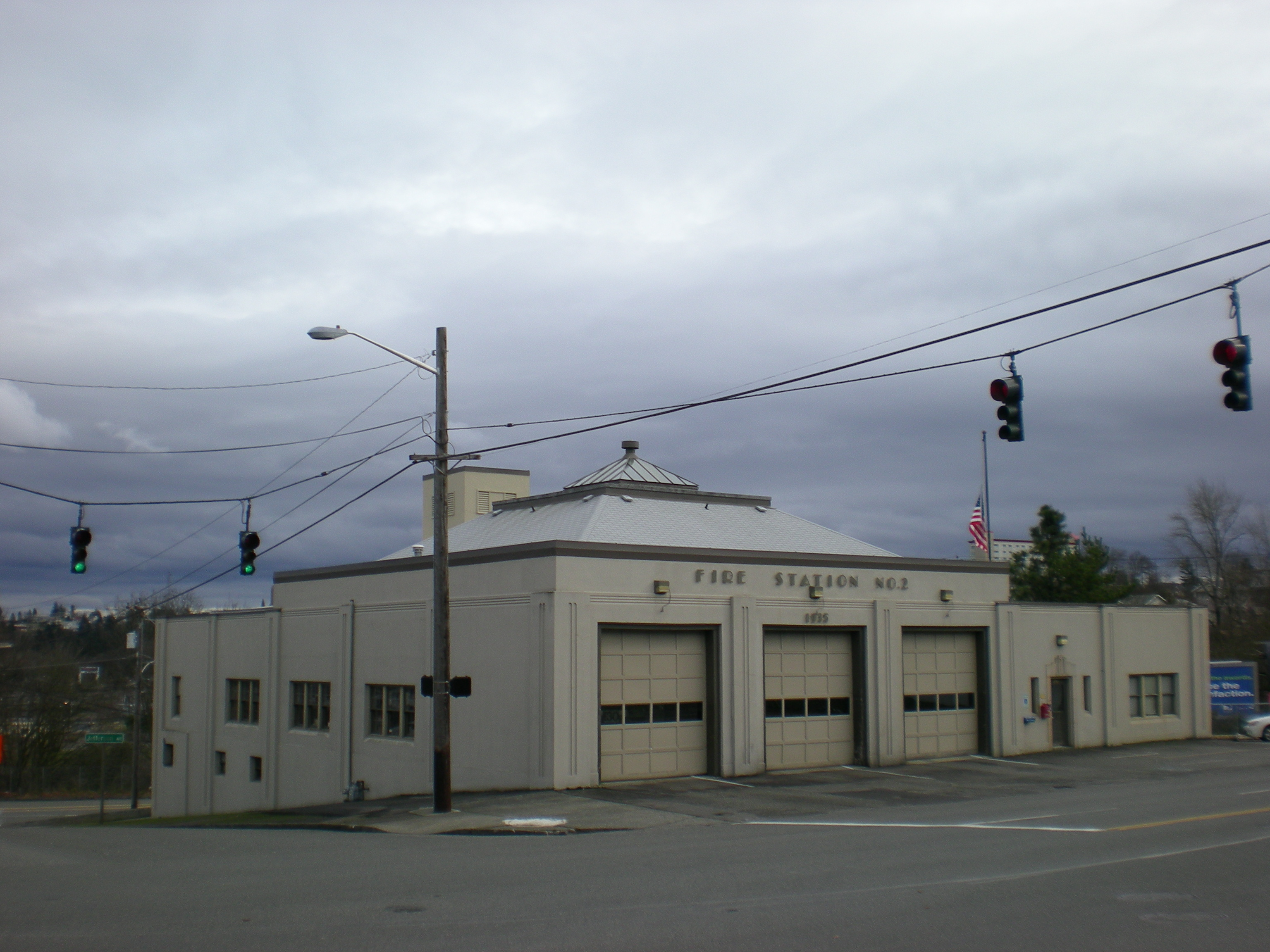
- The fire station in 2008

- Location within Washington (state) Location within the United States
- Location: 2701 S. Tacoma Ave., Tacoma, Washington
- Coordinates: 47°14′11″N 122°26′21″W
- Area: less than 1 acre (0.40 ha)
- Built: 1907
- Built by: Knoell Brothers
- Architect: Silas E. Nelsen
- Architectural style: Art Deco
- MPS: Historic Fire Stations of Tacoma, Washington TR (64000904)
- NRHP reference No.: 86000972
- Added to NRHP: 2 May 1986

Fire Station No. 2 is a fire station located at 2701 S Tacoma Avenue in Tacoma, Washington. The Art Deco building was designed by architect Salas E. Nelson and built by Knoell Brothers in 1907. It was listed on the National Register of Historic Places on May 2, 1986, as part of the thematic resource, "Historic Fire Stations of Tacoma, Washington".

== See also ==
- Historic preservation
- National Register of Historic Places listings in Pierce County, Washington
