= Fire Station No. 1 (Tacoma, Washington) =

- U.S. National Register of Historic Places
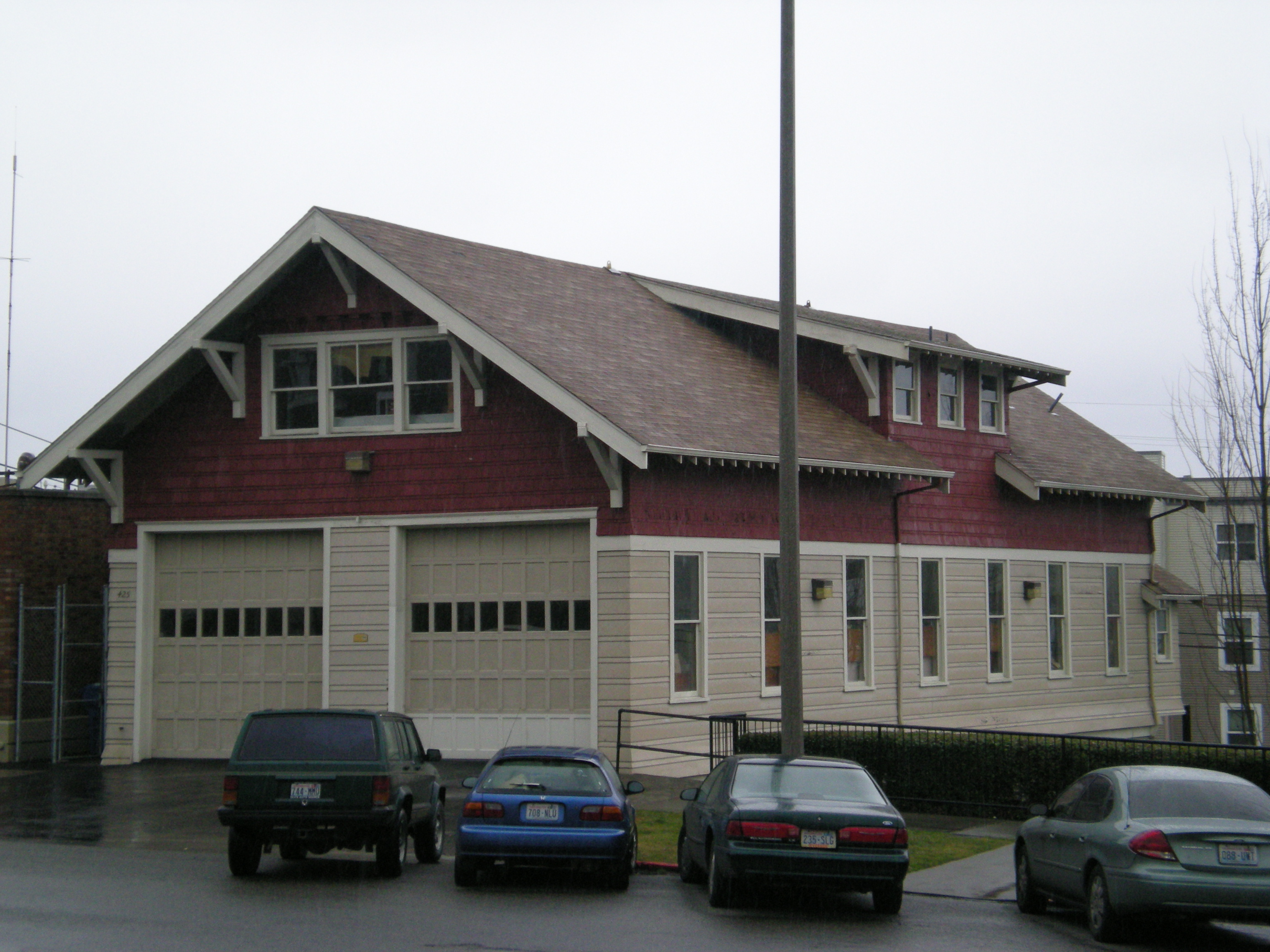
- Fire Station No. 1 in 2008

- Location within Washington (state) Location within the United States
- Location: 425 S. Tacoma Ave., Tacoma, Washington
- Coordinates: 47°15′32″N 122°26′40″W
- Area: less than 1 acre (0.40 ha)
- Built: 1919
- Built by: Chris Wick
- Architectural style: Bungalow/American craftsman
- MPS: Historic Fire Stations of Tacoma, Washington TR (64000904)
- NRHP reference No.: 86000974
- Added to NRHP: 2 May 1986

Fire Station No. 1 is a historic fire station located at 425 S Tacoma Avenue in Tacoma, Washington. It was listed on the National Register of Historic Places on May 2, 1986 as one of eleven properties in a thematic group, "Historic Fire Stations of Tacoma, Washington".

== See also ==
- Historic preservation
- National Register of Historic Places listings in Pierce County, Washington
