= Fire Station No. 5 (Tacoma, Washington) =

- U.S. National Register of Historic Places
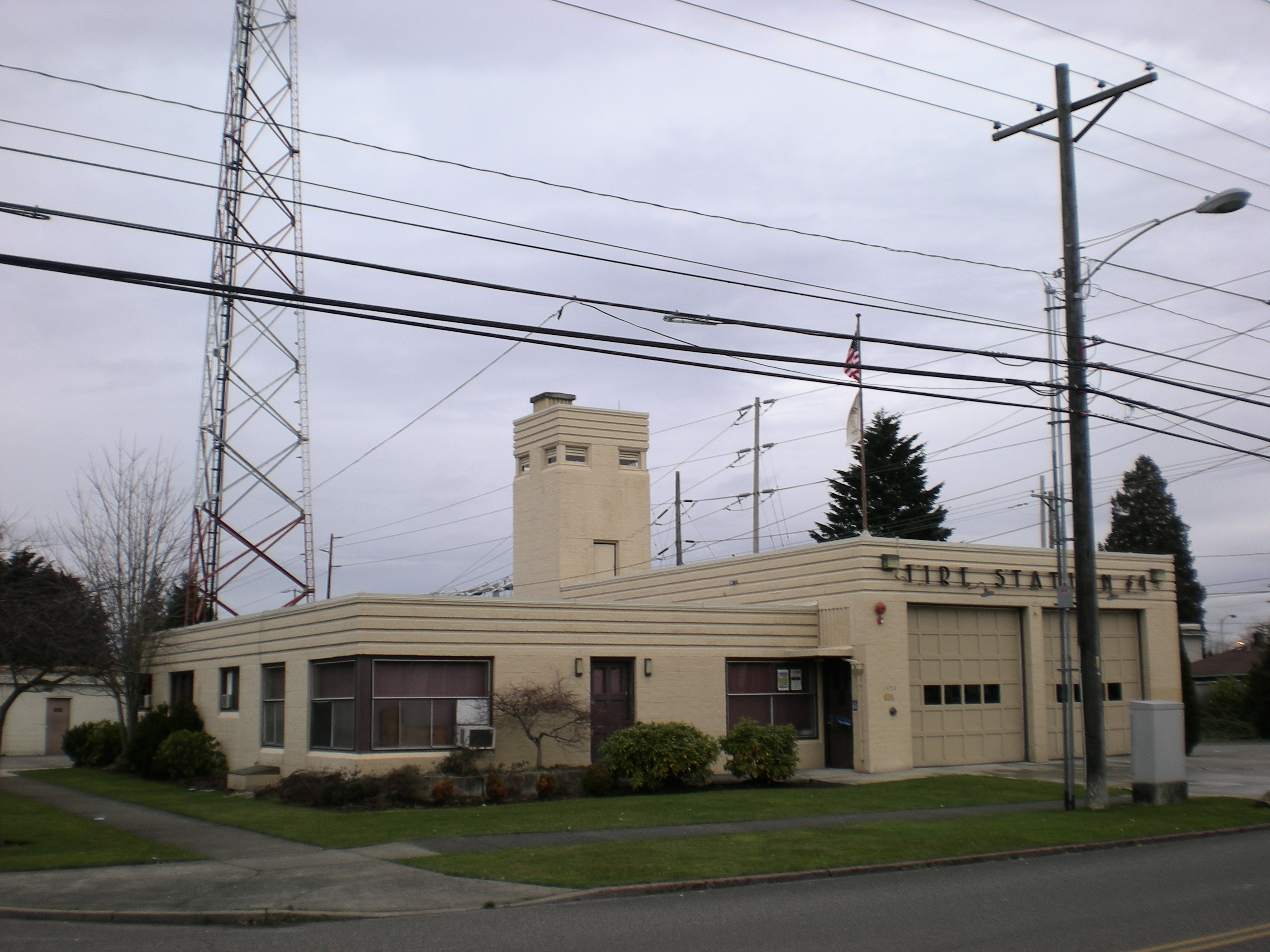
- Fire Station No. 5 in Tacoma, Washington

- Location within Washington (state)
- Location: 1453 S. Twelfth St., Tacoma, Washington
- Coordinates: 47°15′3″N 122°27′19″W
- Area: less than one acre
- Built: 1935
- Architect: Silas Nelsen
- Architectural style: Moderne, Art Deco
- MPS: Historic Fire Stations of Tacoma, Washington TR
- NRHP reference No.: 86000971
- Added to NRHP: May 2, 1986

Fire Station No. 5 is a fire station located in Tacoma, Washington listed on the National Register of Historic Places. It is currently still in active service, but was renamed Fire Station 4 when Tacoma's former Station 4 at 222 E 26th Street was closed.

Tacoma has since had two other Stations 5. Tacoma's second fireboat station, which opened in 1983 at 3301 Ruston Way but has since ceased fire operations, and Tacoma's former Station 15 at 3510 E 11th St., which was closed in 2012 when a new Station 15 opened in Tacoma's lower east side. The former Station 15 has since been considered for reopening and has been renamed Station 5.

== See also ==
- List of National Historic Landmarks in Washington (state)
