= Alderton School =

- U.S. National Register of Historic Places
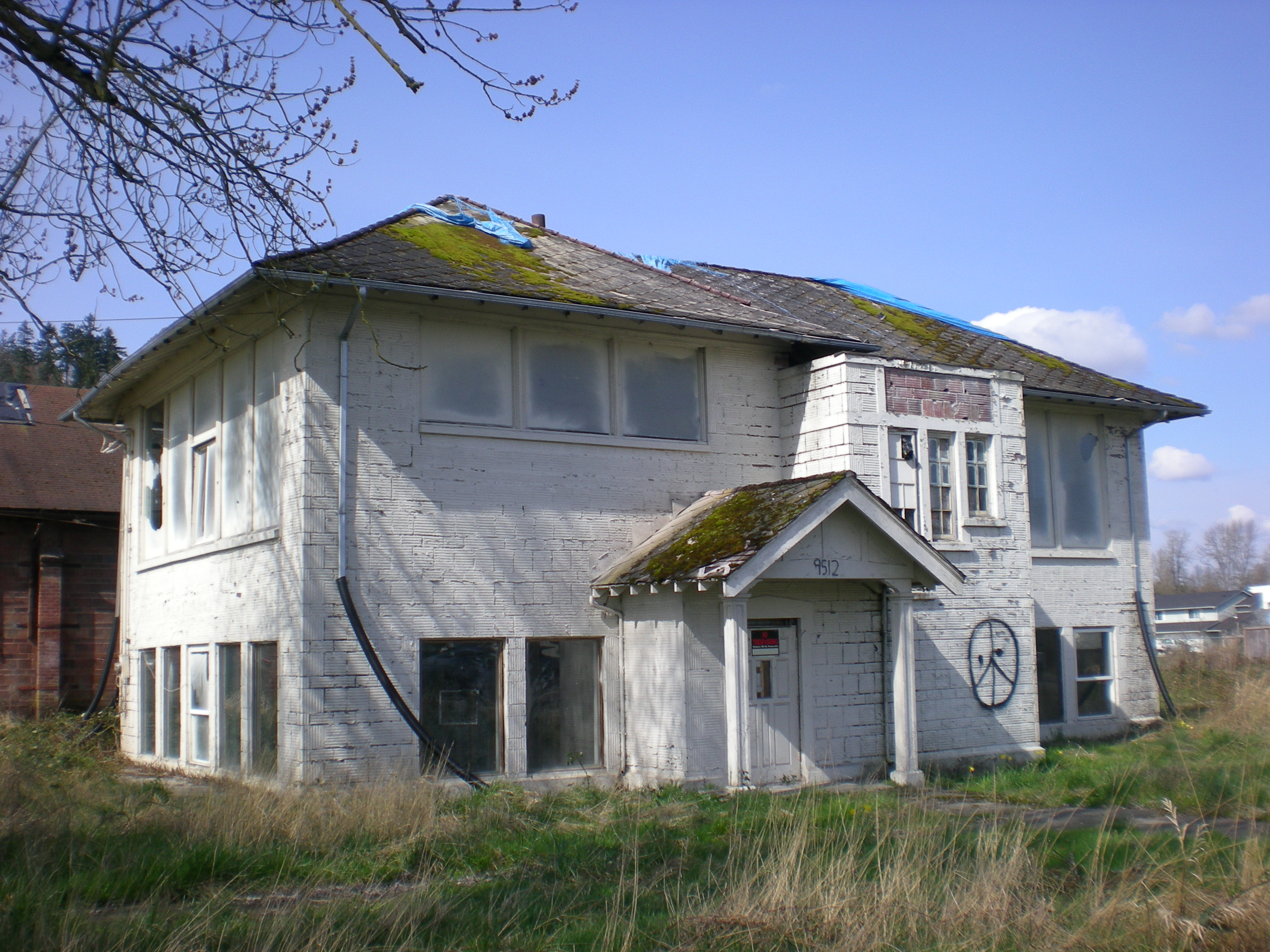
- The former Alderton School in Alderton, Washington.

- Location within Washington (state) Location within the United States
- Location: 9512 Orting Hwy., E., Alderton, Washington
- Coordinates: 47°10′12″N 122°13′43″W
- Area: less than one acre
- Architectural style: Hipped roof vernacular
- MPS: Rural Public Schools of Washington State MPS
- NRHP reference No.: 87001171
- Added to NRHP: July 15, 1987

The Alderton School is an historic schoolhouse located in Alderton, Washington. The two-story brick building was constructed in 1915, and along with an adjoining brick gymnasium, was part of a second period of rural school development in Pierce County. The school was listed to the National Register of Historic Places in 1987.

The Alderton School, but not the gymnasium, was partially demolished in May 2026 after the county mistakenly authorized a permit for its removal. The buildings were among the few extant properties associated with the development of Alderton, and one of only two rural school buildings remaining in Central Pierce County.

== History ==
=== Background ===
Pierce County was settled in the 19th century by families attracted by the area's vast forests, rich mineral deposits, fertile farmland, and saltwater harbors. In Alderton, the economy was dominated by extractive industries—principally logging and farming. Extractive economies lead to the creation of widely-scattered rural communities near the resources. They are often inaccessible to urban areas. While Tacoma had a diversified economy based on heavy industry, trade, and transportation, the sparsely-settled rural areas were dominated by a single economic mainstay.

=== Alderton School ===
The two-story Alderton School and an adjoining gymnasium were constructed in 1915. The brick structures replaced a wood-frame school that had existed on the property. The buildings were noted to be part of a "second period of rural school development" in Pierce County and the schoolhouse was one of two remaining rural schools in the central region of the county.

The elementary facility was last used as a school in 1958, and along with the gym, had remained vacant for some time up to 2026. The school and gym were reported to be covered in graffiti.

=== Demolition ===
The Alderton School was partially demolished beginning on May 18, 2026 after the Pierce County Planning and Public Works department erroneously issued a demolition permit to the property's owner for both the schoolhouse and gymnasium. A stop order was issued later that day which required further removal to be approved by an historic preservation officer along with consultation with the county's Landmarks and Historic Preservation Commission (LHPC). At the time of the stop order, over half of the school building had been razed but the gym structure remained standing and untouched. The error was due to a failure of an internal alert system to notice the building was listed on historic registers; a county employee caught the mistake.

At the time, demolition permits in the county did not require a reason for a structure's removal. While the school had acquired multiple historic designations, the listings are not able to prevent private ownership from alterations or removal of historic structures. Potential future use of the grounds after the demolition were unknown at the time as no further permits or submitted applications were found.

The school was described by a prior student as an "eyesore, a public nuisance", having deteriorated to a point where the building had not been of value to the area for decades. The owners of the grounds, Alderton School LLC under the Spooner family of Spooner Farms, also noted the eyesore nature, expressing worry for the safety of trespassers, as well as concerns for children who play on the property.

In June 2026, the LHPC authorized, by a 4-1 vote, the full demolition of Alderton School. As part of a mitigation agreement with the property owners, the commission included a recommendation that an historical essay of the school be written at HistoryLink. During a hearing on the matter, it was noted by the LHPC that the gymnasium's Clay City brick was rare in the county and questioned if a grant to save the building material had been instigated. An engineering report was released to the commission, listing both the schoolhouse and gymnasium to be "structurally unsound". Various issues included a sagging roof, a collapsed balcony, fallen stairways, and floor joists with water damage.

After the Spooner family purchased the property between the late-2000s and early 2010s, the gym was initially planned to be used as a "haunted house or something". Future plans after demolition includes the placement of gravel over the grounds, to be used to store the owner's farm equipment.

Deterioration

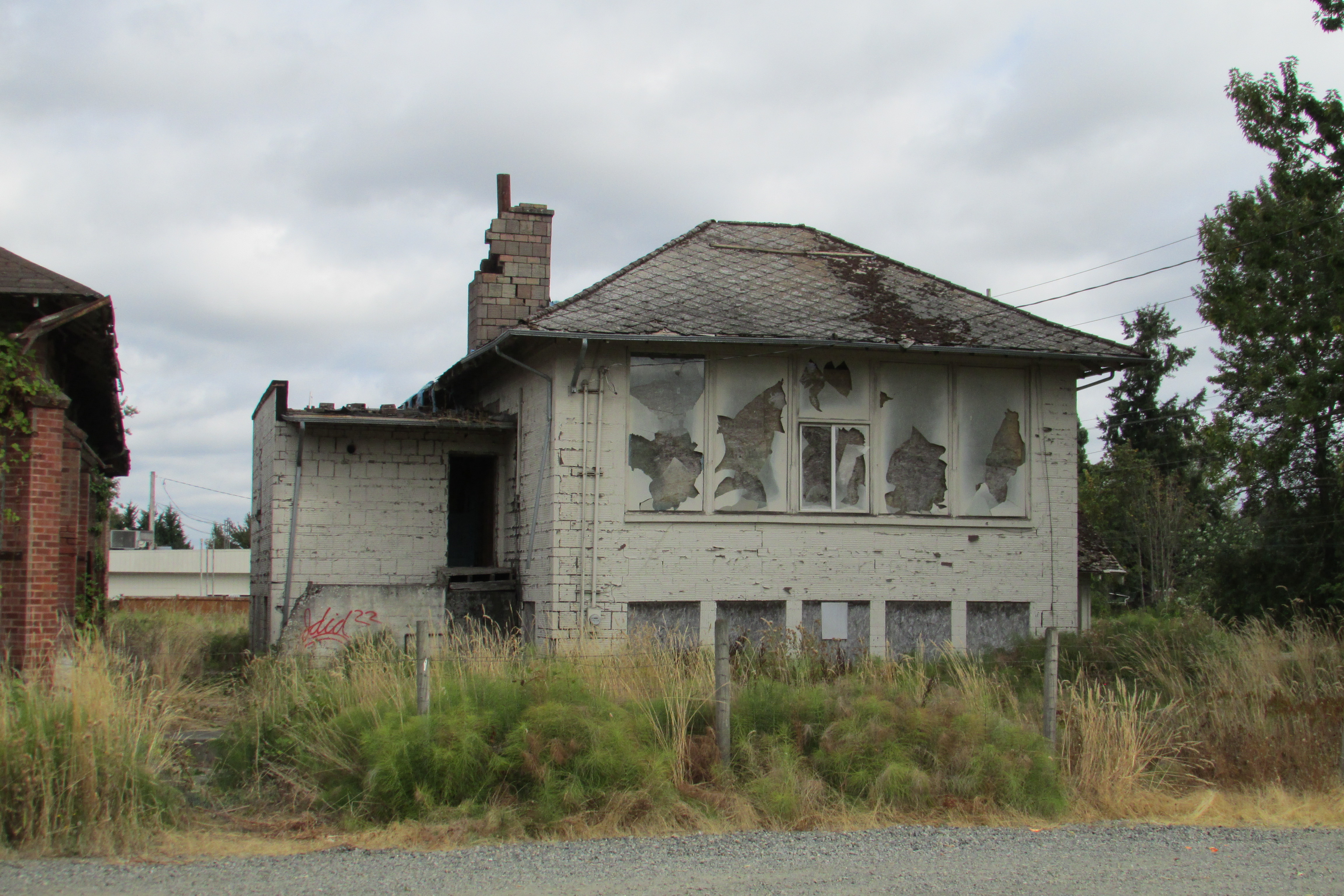
South façade, 2022

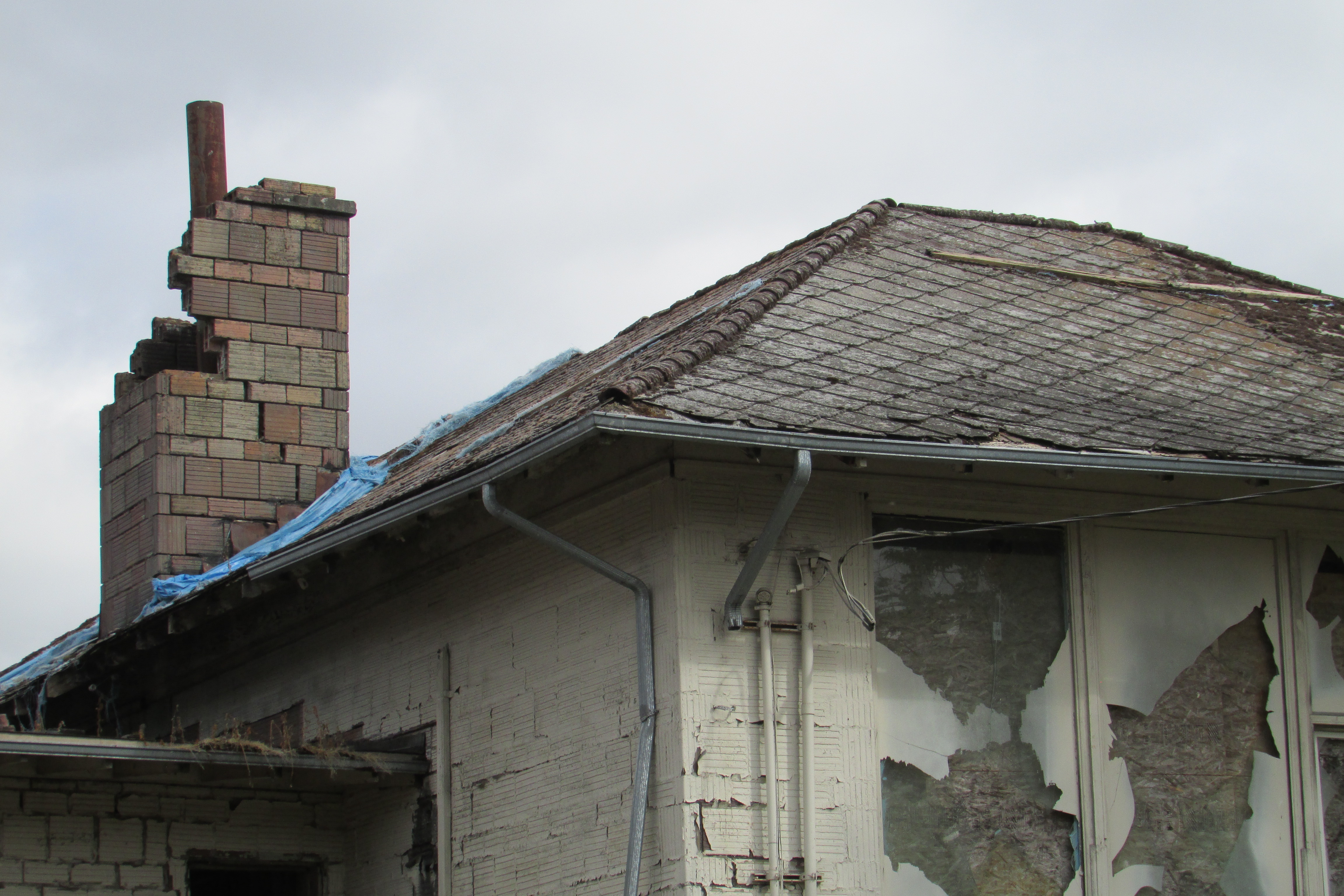
Chimney, detail, 2022

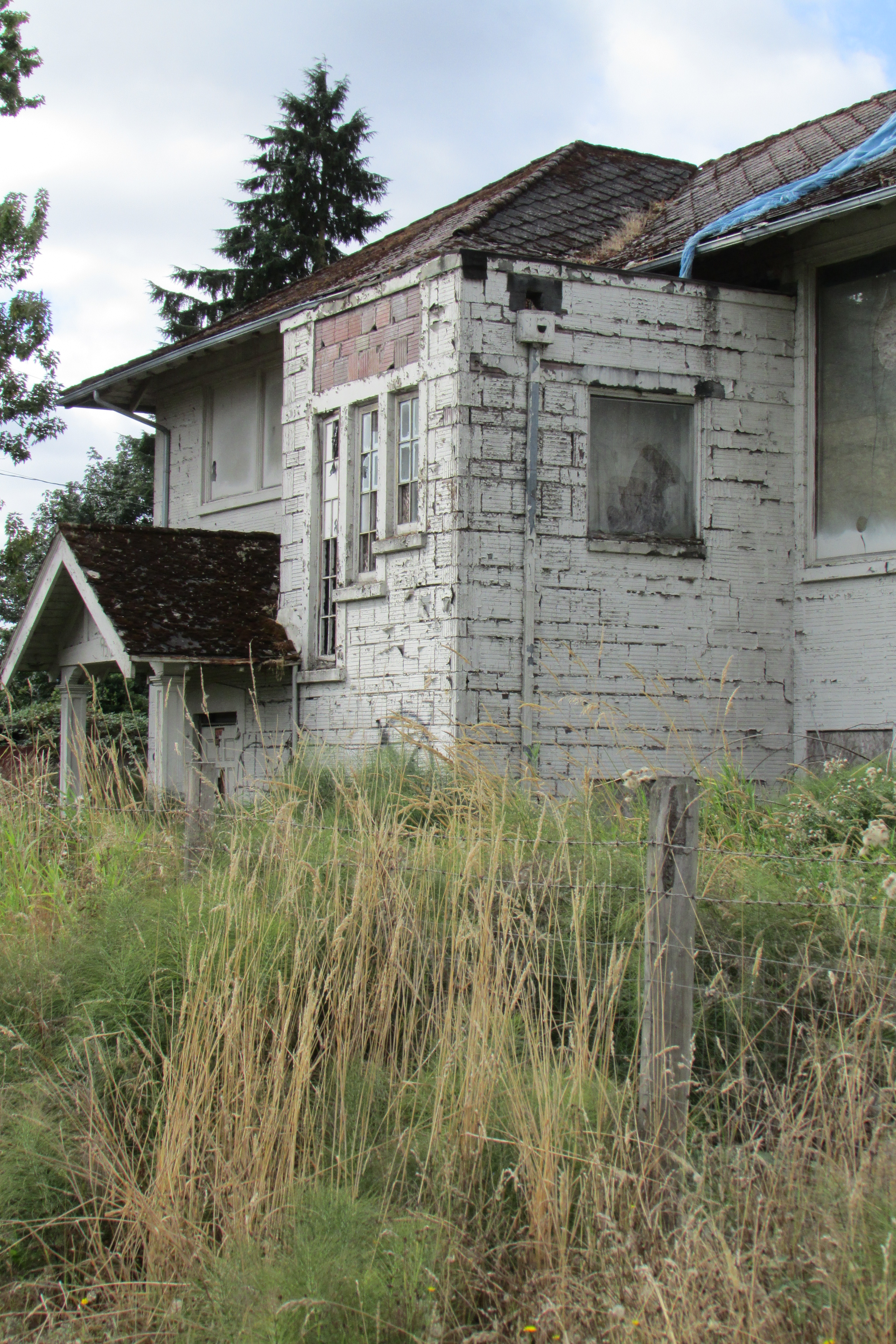
Front stairwell, 2022

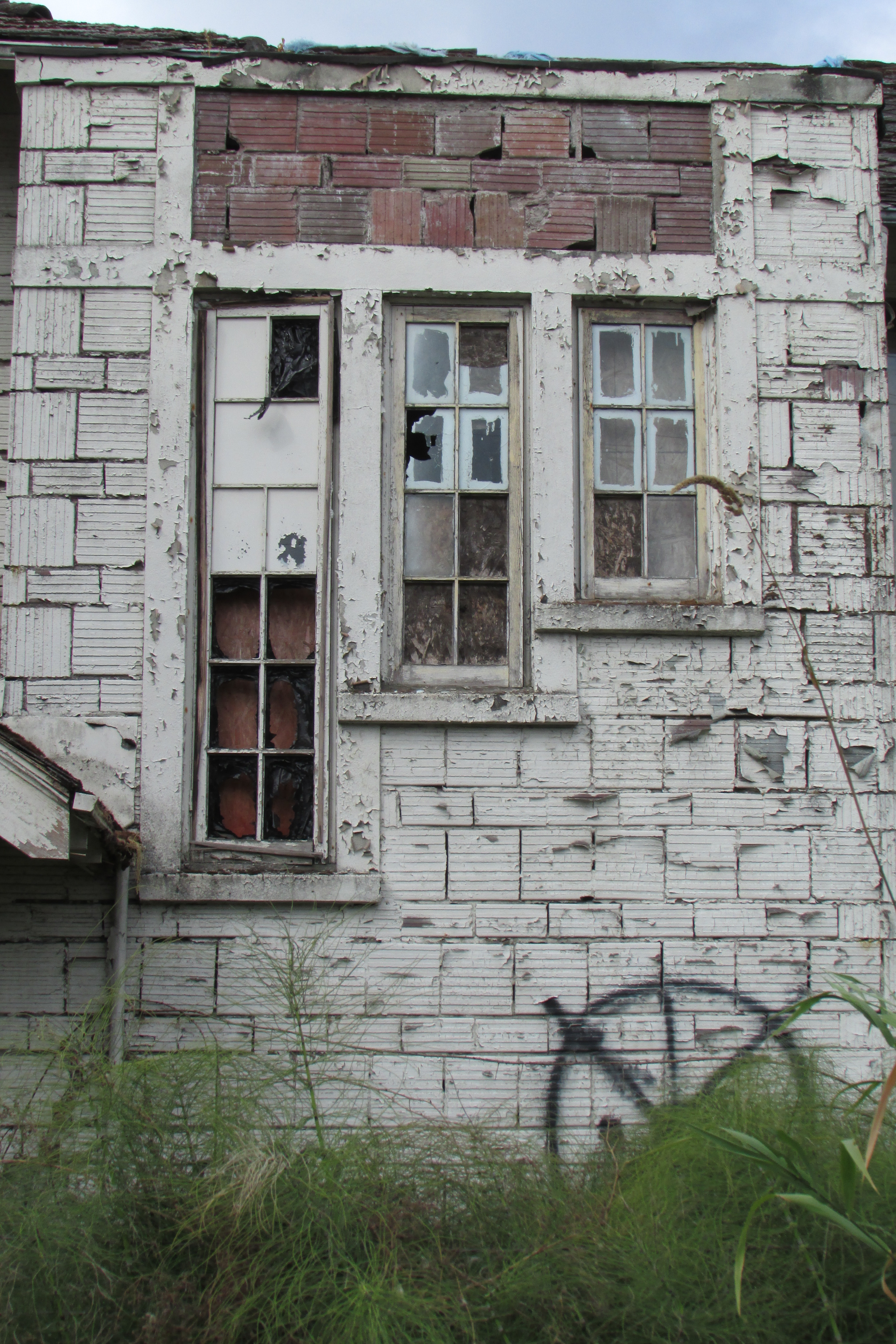
Stairwell, detail, 2022

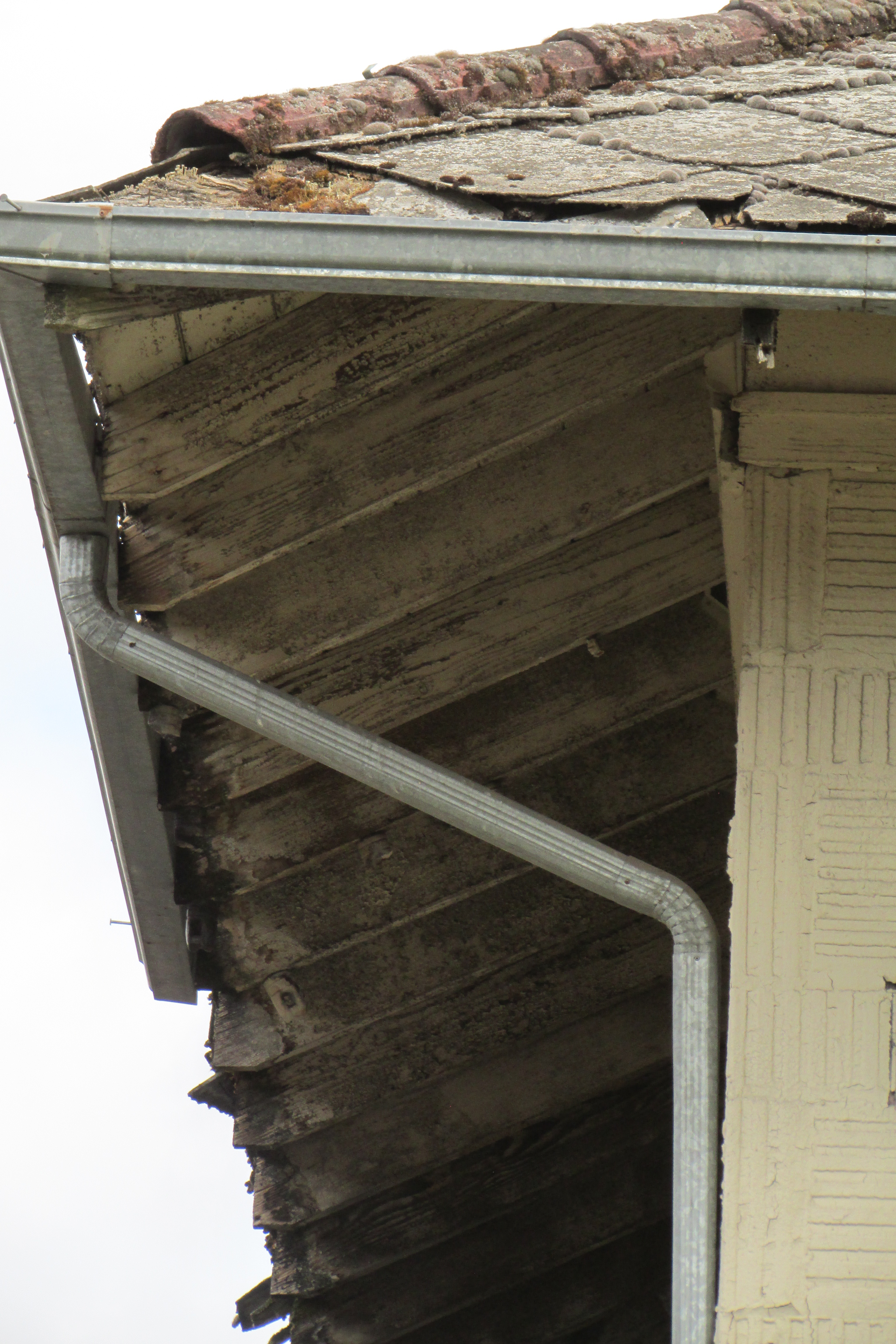
Eaves and rafters, 2022

== Architecture and features ==
The school was a two-story brick structure built in 1915. The school is located at the crossroad of Washington State Route 162 (Military Road) and N 96th E Street; the grounds are near the community founder's home and an older store. Next to the schoolhouse is a brick gymnasium.

The rectangular school building was constructed of Clay City brick that was locally produced. The truncated hip roof is considered irregular and a chimney with a metal hood was placed on the rear slope. The front and rear wings had flat roofs. The parapet over the front door once contained a school sign board. The schoolhouse had a front bay with an interior stairwell; a rear addition housed the furnace.

Schoolhouse and gymnasium

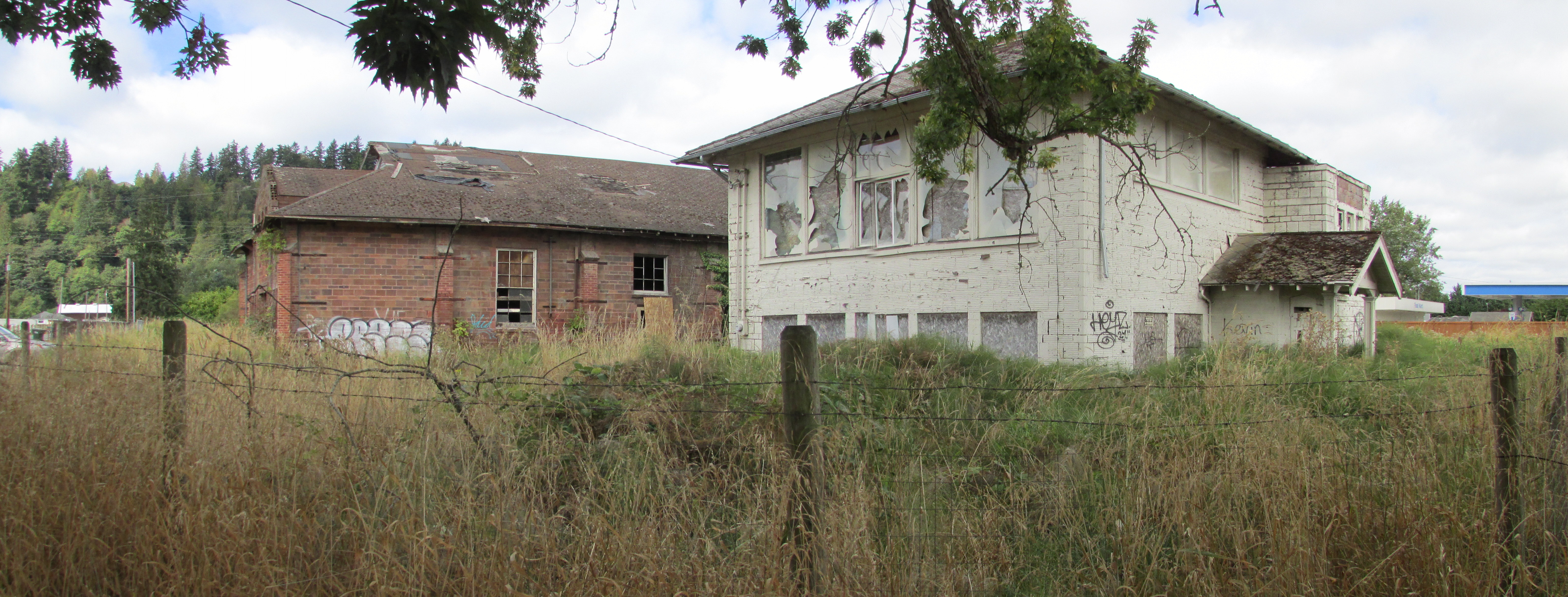
Schoolhouse and gymnasium, 2022

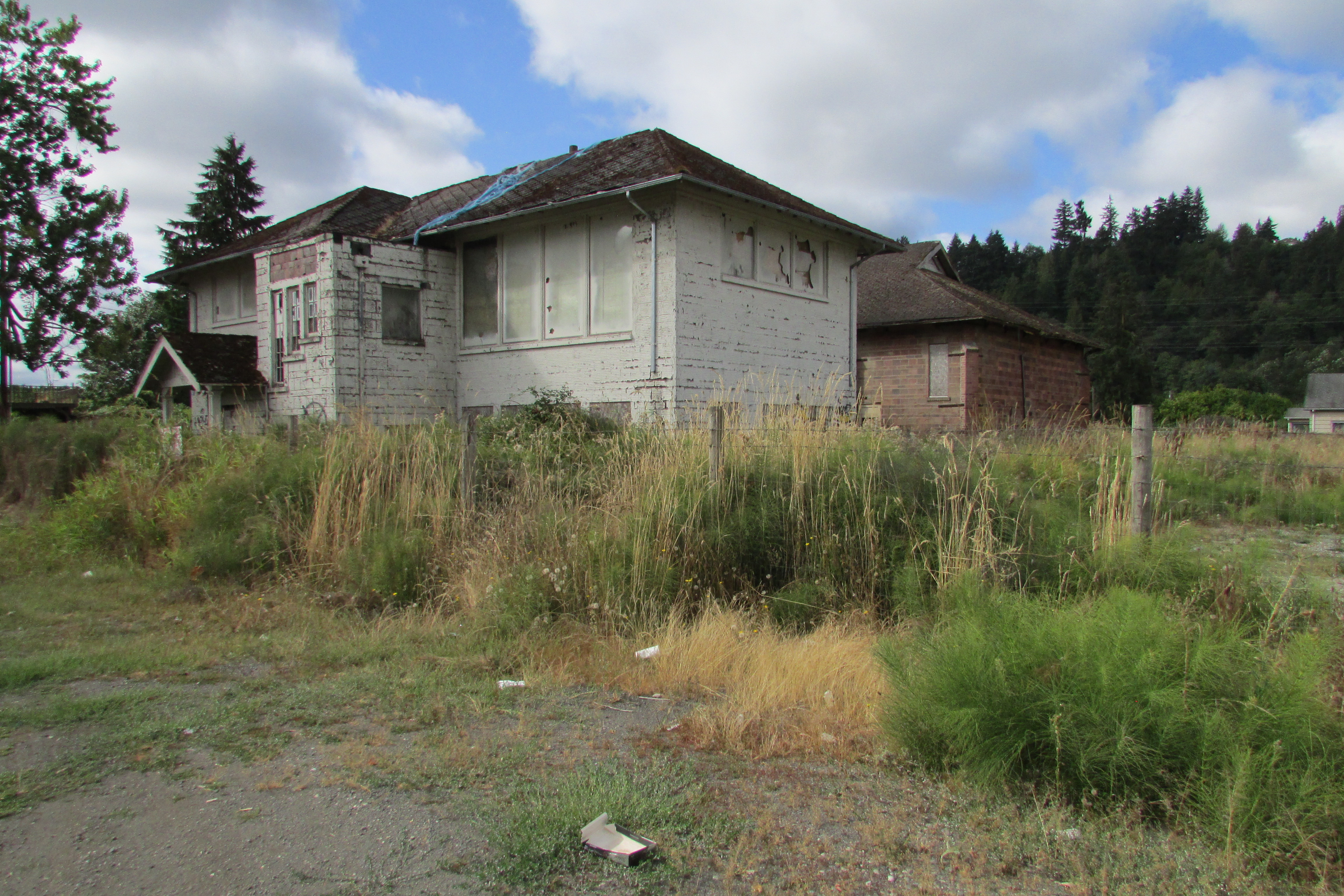
Alternate view, 2022

== Significance ==
Alderton School was added to the Pierce County Register of Historic Places in 1986. The following year, the schoolhouse was listed to the Washington Heritage Register and the National Register of Historic Places.
