= Silver Creek Ranger Station =

- U.S. National Register of Historic Places
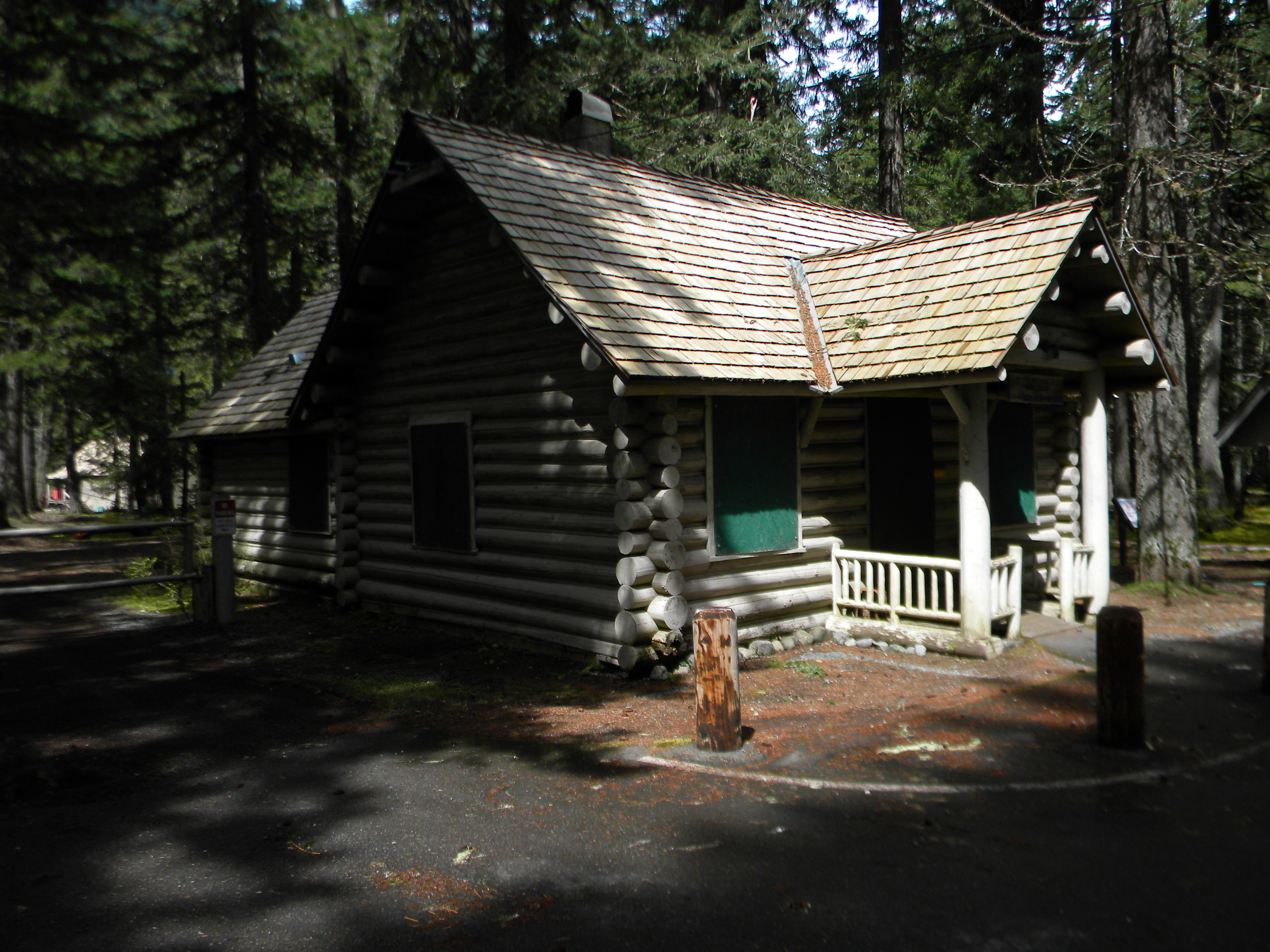
- Silver Creek Ranger Station.

- Location within Washington (state) Location within the United States
- Nearest city: Crystal Mountain, Washington
- Area: 24 acres (9.7 ha)
- Built: 1936
- Architect: Regional Office Architecture Group
- Architectural style: USDA Rustic
- MPS: USDA Forest Service Administrative Buildings in Oregon and Washington Built by the CCC MPS
- NRHP reference No.: 91000707
- Added to NRHP: June 7, 1991

The buildings of the Silver Creek Ranger Station typify Civilian Conservation Corps (CCC) and Economic Recovery Act (ERA). These relief programs employed local youth and experienced craftsmen. Building materials and camp supplies were obtained locally. The U.S. Forest Service's was the host agency and the facility was the headquarters for field operation The design of the buildings is an example of the rustic architectural style used by the Forest Service. Building 1362 (originally the office, converted to a bunkhouse) is rare. Only three log Depression-era offices are known in the Pacific Northwest Region.

== Description ==
The Silver Creek Ranger Station is located in a forest of Douglas-fir and Pacific silver fir. It is along Washington State Route 410 and the White River, and short distance north of the Northeast Entrance to Mount Rainier National Park. The historic site includes an office, a residence, a garage, a warehouse, and an equipment storage building. All were built the Great Depression. There are five additional buildings and structures which are not of historic interest. The Ranger Station was established after World War I, when a road was constructed to the area. The roadway became a popular Sunday trip from Seattle and Tacoma. It provided access to both a nearby towns to Silver Creek and to White River Camp in Mt. Rainier National Park. The Ranger Station was located to provided services to growing recreational use. It was used during the summer season. The first buildings were a three-sided woodshed/garage, and a frame structure. The frame structure contained a one-room office, a tool and warehouse room, a kitchen, and sleeping quarters plus an unfinished second floor. This building burned in 1930, and a new office was built the following year. That building is the front part of Building 1362. In 1941, winter operations were transferred from Tacoma to Enumclaw followed in 1943 by the move of the summer operations. The Silver Creek facility was turned into a work center.

== Bibliography ==
- McCullough, R. Nevan, 1970 Interpretive study of the White River drainage. Photocopy of typescript, on file, USDA Forest Service, Mt. Baker-Snoqualmie National Forest, Cultural Resource staff, Seattle.
- Throop, E. Gail, 1984 USDA Forest Service administrative buildings in the State [sic] of Oregon and Washington built by the Civilian Conservation Corps. USDA Forest Service, Pacific Northwest Region, Portland.
