= Charles W. Orton House =

- U.S. National Register of Historic Places
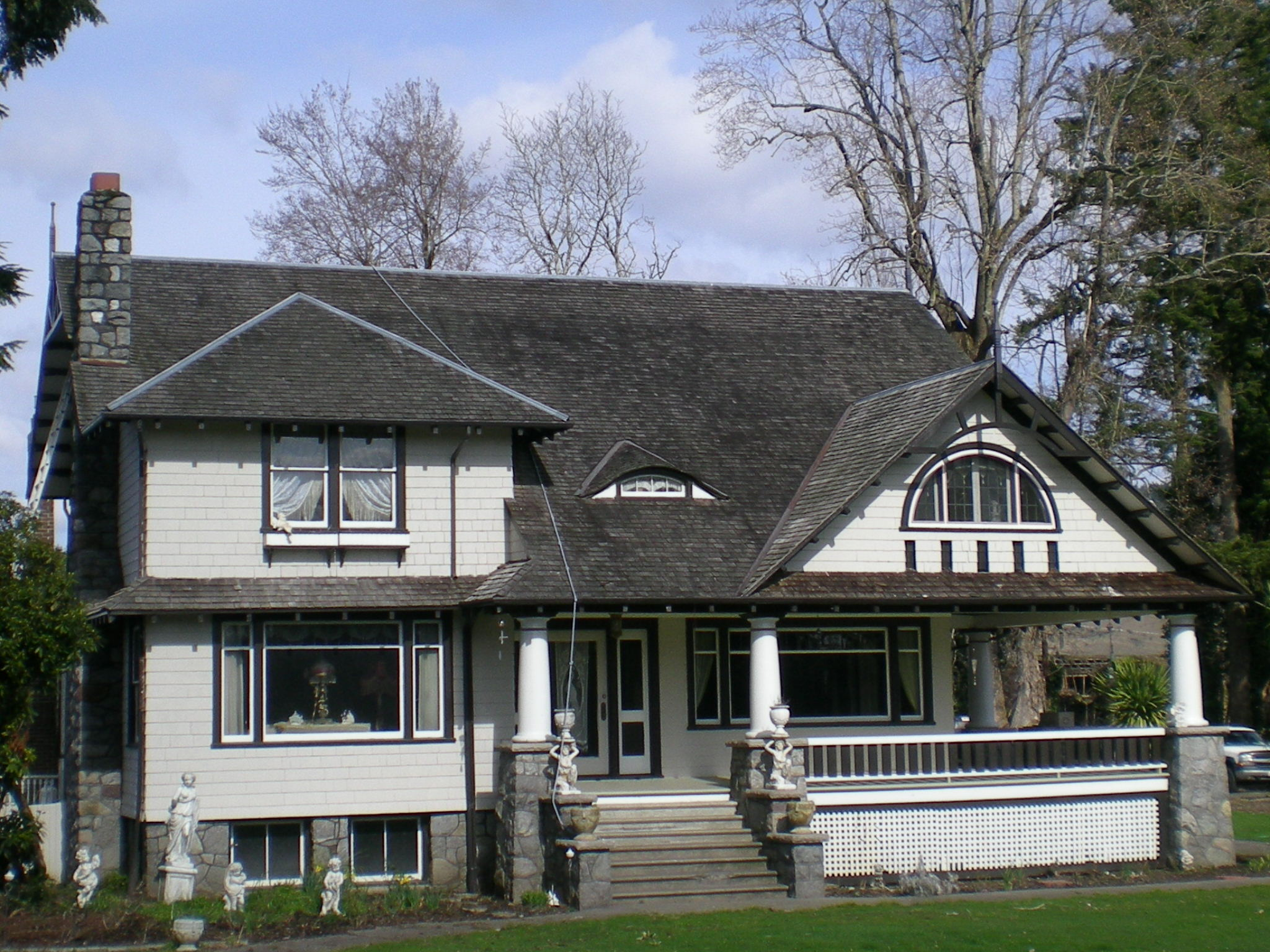

- Location within Washington (state)
- Location: 7473 Riverside Rd., E., Sumner, Washington
- Coordinates: 47°11′14″N 122°13′15″W
- Area: 1.5 acres (0.61 ha)
- Built: 1914
- Architectural style: Late Victorian
- NRHP reference No.: 83003350
- Added to NRHP: July 28, 1983

The Charles W. Orton House is a historic residential building in Sumner, Washington, United States. It was constructed in 1914 for Charles W. Orton, a local businessman who operated a dairy farm and grew plant bulbs in the Puyallup Valley.

== Bibliography ==
- America's Forgotten Architecture, National Trust for Historic Preservation, 1976.
- History of Pierce County, W.P. Bonney, 1927, Vol. 3, p. 650.
- "Million Dollar Northwest Industry," Great Northern Goat, Great Northern Railway Co., September 1947.
