= Fox Island School =

- U.S. National Register of Historic Places
- U.S. National Historic Landmark
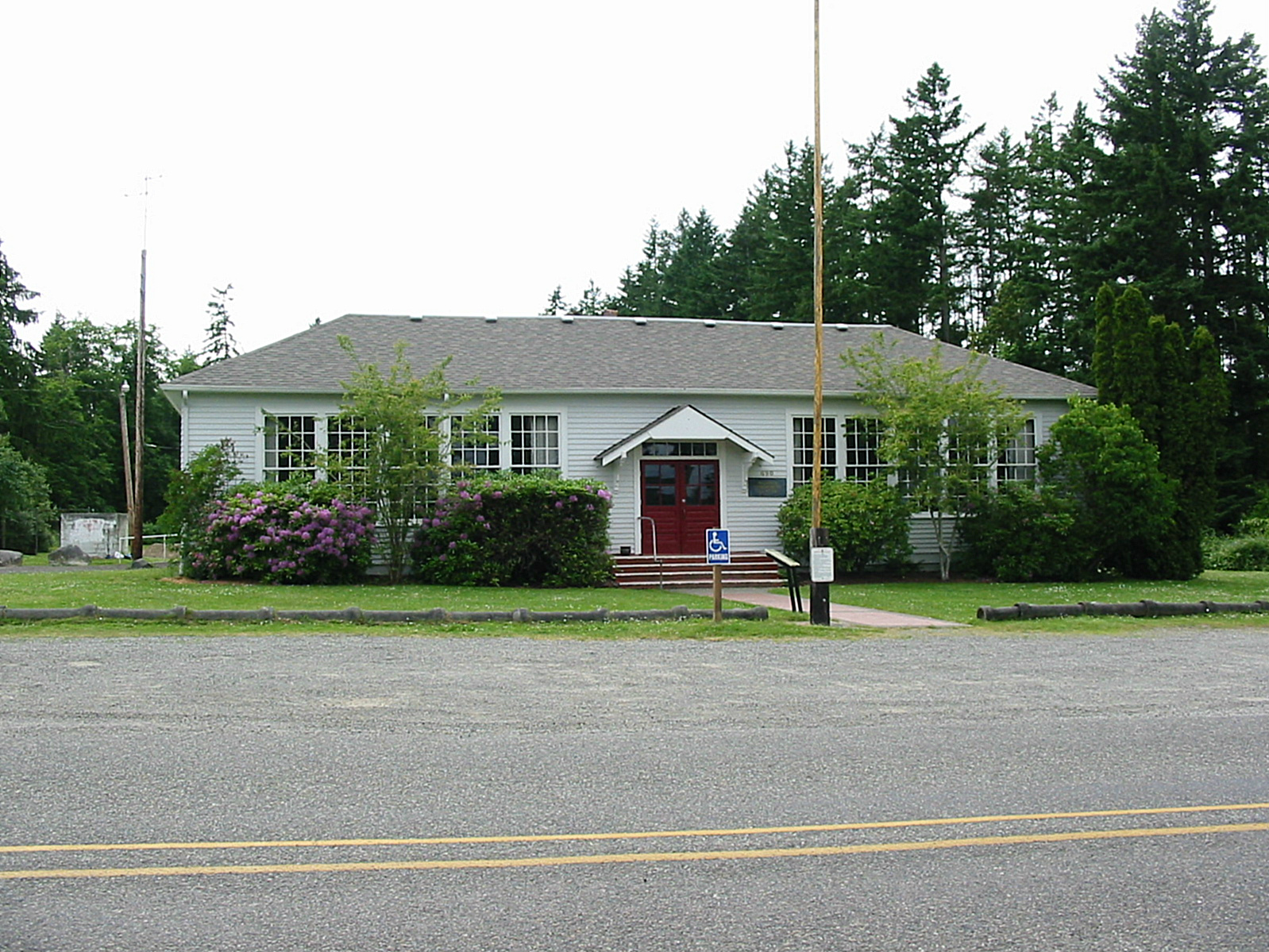
- The Fox Island School, now Nichols Community Center in 2011

- Location within Washington (state)
- Nearest city: Gig Harbor
- Coordinates: 47°15′14.41″N 122°37′17.14″W
- Built: 1934
- Built by: Works Progress Administration
- NRHP reference No.: 87001167
- Added to NRHP: July 15, 1987

The Fox Island School is a former public school in Fox Island, Washington. On 15. July 1987 the National Register of Historic Places listed the building under the reference number 87001167 as a historic building.

== Building ==
There were two classrooms for grades 1–4, and 5–8 on the first floor. The auditorium, which was used as a lunchroom also, has a stage on one side. Kitchen and restrooms are on the first floor also. The furnace, a play room, and storage were placed in the basement. The grounds were furnished with a baseball field, a playground, and a barn used to store the school bus.

== History ==
The school was built under aid of the Works Progress Administration in 1934. Between 1943 and 1948 the class sizes fluctuated so there were times when only one class was taught. The Fox Island School District #337 was integrated into the Peninsula School District #401 in 1959 and the Fox Island School was closed in 1961. First the Grange took possession and later the Fox Island Community and Recreation Association (FICRA) took over operating the Fox Island School as a Community Center. In honor of Col. Frederick Nichols the name Nichols Center was given to the Community Center in 1981.

== Literature ==
- LCCN /93/-72018 Fox Island - A History by G. L. Miller
