= Dieringer School =

- U.S. National Register of Historic Places
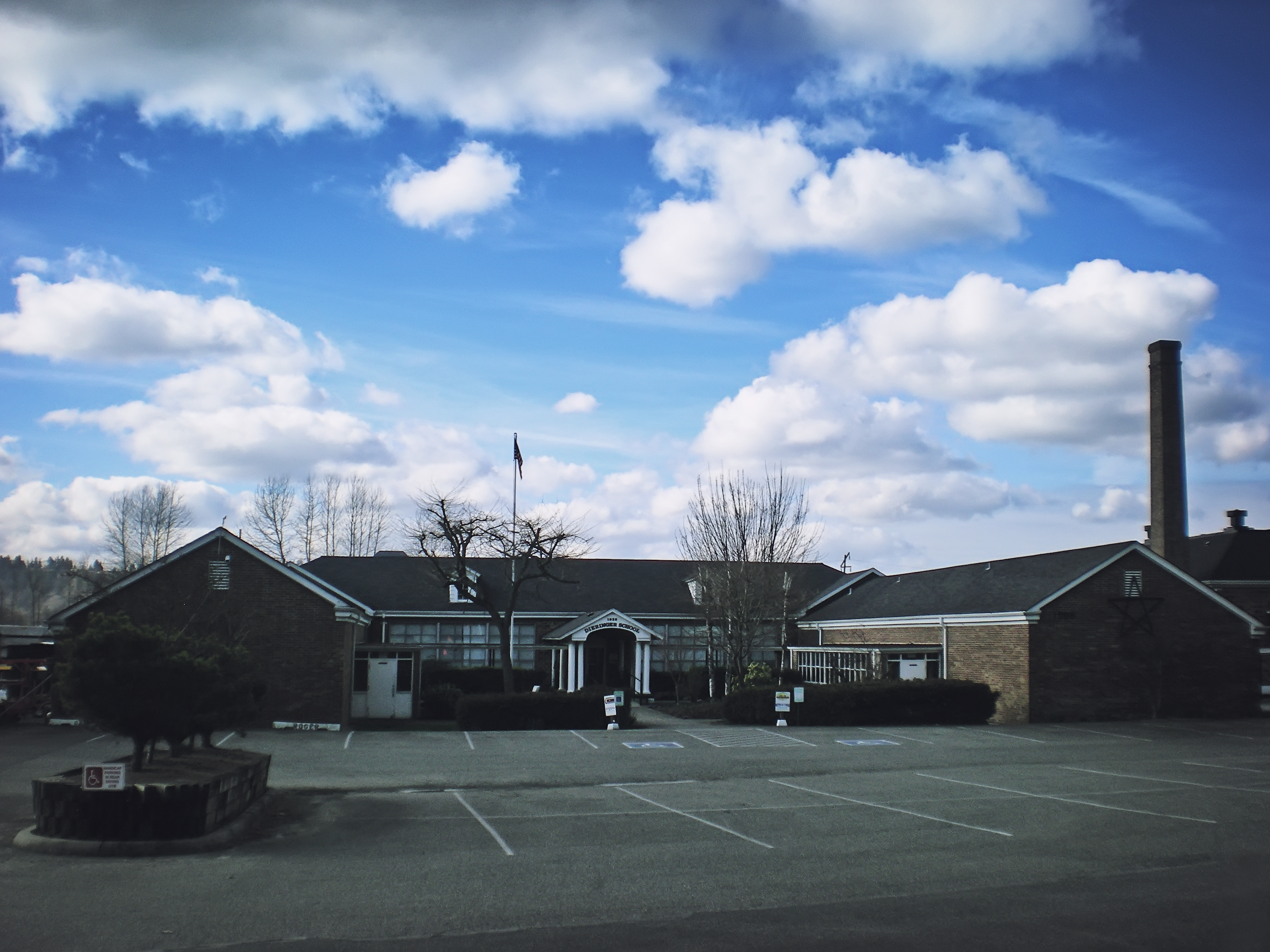
- The former Dieringer School in Sumner, Washington

- Location within Washington (state)
- Location: 1808 E. Valley Hwy., Sumner, Washington
- Coordinates: 47°14′28″N 122°13′33″W
- Area: less than one acre
- Built: 1921
- Architect: Emanuel J. Bresemann
- Architectural style: Colonial Revival
- MPS: Rural Public Schools of Washington State MPS
- NRHP reference No.: 97000324
- Added to NRHP: April 14, 1997

The Dieringer School buildings are the last remaining group associated with the Dieringer community. Constructed in 1921 and 1928 by Tacoma architect Emanuel J. Bresemann. As the community of Norwood, established on May 5, 1888, with Joseph C. Dieringer, its first postmaster. Dieringer, had a restaurant in Tacoma, before he moved to the Stuck River Valley in the 1880s. Dr. Charles H. Spinning, had been a physician in the 1860s at the Cushman Indian Agency on the Puyallup Reservation, provided the land for the Dieringer School. In 1892, the post office name was changed from Norwood to Dieringer to honor its first postmaster.

== History ==
Before 1907, Dieringer was an agricultural community. This changed after the 1906 floods which shifted the White River into the Stuck River and eliminated the community along the Northern Pacific (now Burlington Northern) Railroad line. After the floods, the area was dominated by the construction of the Pacific Coast Power Company] (now the Puget Sound Power and Light Company) hydroelectric power plant which was completed in 1912. During construction, the company had its main camp at Dieringer. Once again, the community expanded with the addition of a general store, hotel, and gas station, adjacent to the power company employees' residences and remaining farms.

The Community was focused on the school. Dieringer district was formed on December 6, 1890. In 1892, they purchased a storage shed and the land on which the school was built from Dr. Spinning. Beginning around 1910, a two-room structure and teacher's cottage were built. Various additions were made to expand the curriculum, providing skills in the domestic science and manual skills. The land around the school was a children's garden. The district let the Dieringer residents cultivate private gardens on the land not needed for educational purposes. The teacher's cottage became the home of the principal. It had been in front of the school building and was moved, the south of the school.)

A gymnasium, swimming pool, and auditorium were approved in 1918 and dedicated in September 1921. These buildings were made available for community use. With the purchase of a movie projector, the gymnasium became a community theater. "Gym Nights" were introduced in the 1920s and night courses in math, grammar, and manual training were available. By the end of the 1920s, the classroom building no longer meet the local needs. In 1927, the district hired Tacoma architect Emanuel J. Bresemann to design a new structure. The building was completed in 1928. The school had three classrooms, a playroom, a library, and rooms for domestic science and manual training.

In June 1936, the Dieringer and Lake Tapps communities chose to consolidate as the Dieringer School District. In January 1995, the Dieringer School campus was sold. The current owners restored the classroom building and gymnasium buildings as office and recreational space. The Dieringer School 1936 consolidation reflects the changes in the small communities in Pierce County as the urban centers expand, and improved roads and automobiles, make access to the larger towns, cities and markets easier. The Dieringer post office closed in 1957 and the community was incorporated into Sumner.

== Appearance ==
The Dieringer School is on the west side of East Valley Highway E north of Sumner. The school sits on the valley floor of the Stuck (White) River facing east towards a wooded bluff. The surrounding land has been developed along East Valley Highway E and remains as farm land or undeveloped. The main Burlington Northern Railroad line runs north to south along the western border. The yard was paved to accommodate parking and school buses. The Dieringer School is a group of three masonry buildings in the Georgian Revival style. The classroom building was built in 1928. It is a one-story masonry building with a symmetrical design and cross gables at each end. The building has a central entry with a small, covered portico, gabled roof and elliptical arched ceiling. The entry has been replaced with flat-roofed canopy on steel pipes. The walls are masonry using a running bond pattern. The design has alternating rows of brick and large structural clay tile units. The base is concrete, with a finished surface, two feet above grade. An addition to the classroom created a "U'-shape building. The roof is composition shingles with a gables. The classroom addition is also of brick laid in a simple running bond pattern.

The gymnasium was constructed in 1921 and is a one-story, masonry building with a truncated hipped roof. Its brick and tile masonry exterior are like the classroom building. The north end of the building has a central gable roof projection. It has a central roofed portico with paired columns. The portico is raised above the adjacent grade approximately two feet. The exterior walls are of alternating courses of brick and structural clay tile set in a running bond pattern. The base of the building has a concrete finish two feet above grade. The interior of the gymnasium building contains a gym floor with basketball court, a small stage opposite elevated bleachers, and a small swimming pool. The interior of the gymnasium building contains a gym floor with basketball court, a small stage opposite elevated bleachers, and a small swimming pool.

The third building is the boiler plant. It is a one-story masonry building located between the classroom building and the gymnasium and was built with the gymnasium. The building is like the other buildings with a hipped, composition shingle roof and boxed eaves. A brick smoke stack approximately 65 feet (20 m) tall. The smoke stack is in American bond, a pattern, with every seventh course being a header course. The smoke stack is capped with corbelled brick.

== Bibliography ==
- Bonney, William Pierce. History of Pierce County. Washington. Chicago, 1927.
- "Bresemann's Brochure: Selections From the Work of EJ. Bresemann, Architect." Tacoma, n.d. (Located in the clipping files of the Tacoma Public Library, 1102 Tacoma Avenue South, Tacoma, WA 98402.)
- "History of Dieringer District 68 and Lake Tapps District 29, 1890 to 1936, From the Time Each District Was Formed to the Time They Consolidated to Form the Dieringer School District No. 343." n.p., n.d. (Typescript chronology drawn from school board minutes located at North Tapps Middle School, 20029-12th Street East, Sumner, WA 98390.) Ramsey, Guy Reed. Postmarked Washington: Pierce County. Tacoma, 1981.
- "White River Development in the Puget Sound District of the State of Washington." Boston, 1912.
