= Fire Station No. 14 (Tacoma, Washington) =

- U.S. National Register of Historic Places
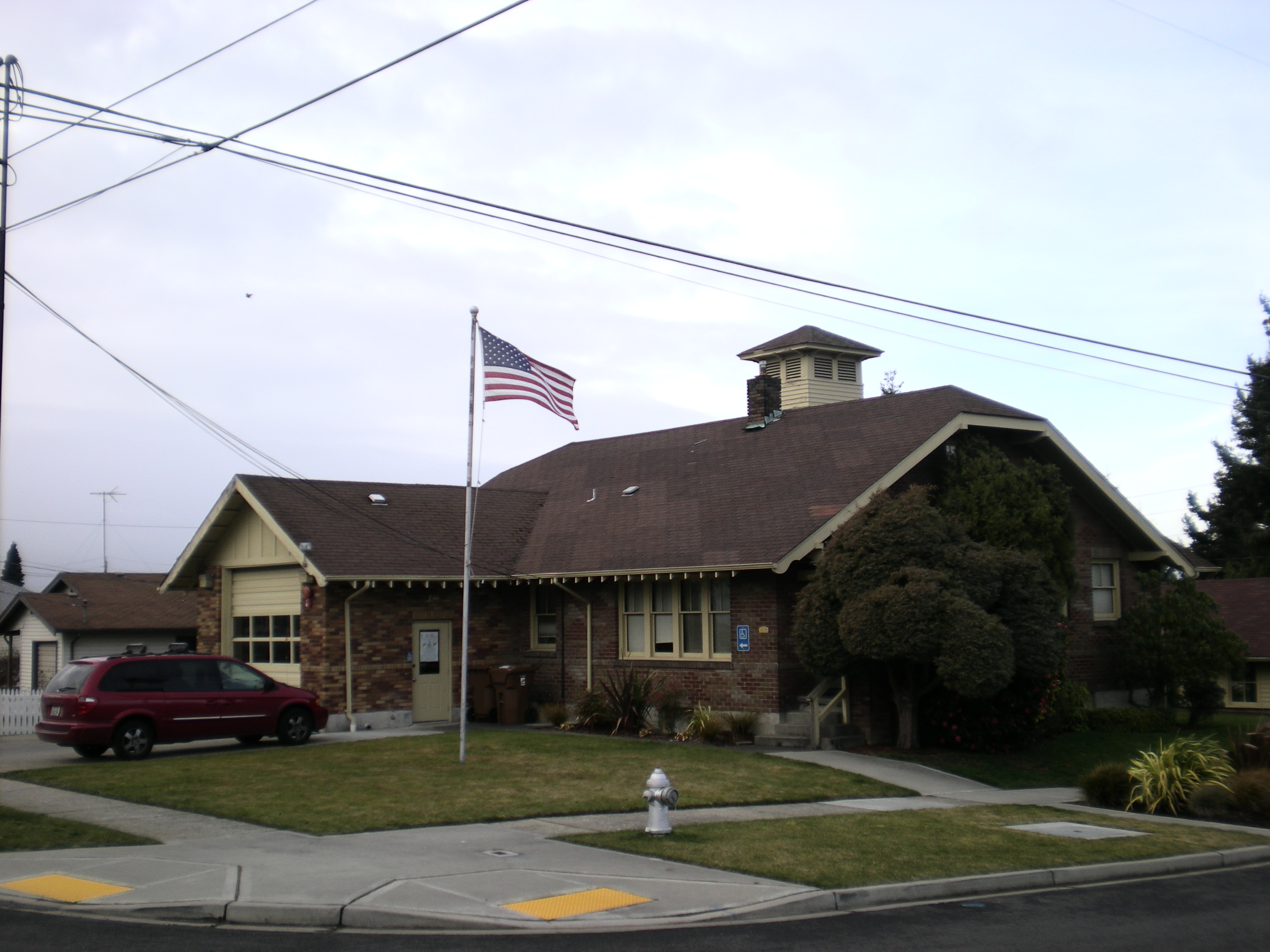
- Fire Station No. 14 in 2008

- Location within Washington (state) Location within the United States
- Location: 4701 N. Forty-first St., Tacoma, Washington
- Coordinates: 47°17′10″N 122°29′56″W
- Area: less than 1 acre (0.40 ha)
- Built: 1928
- Built by: Martin H. Marker
- Architect: Morton J. Nicholson
- Architectural style: Late 19th And 20th Century Revivals, Bungalow/American craftsman, Tudor Revival
- MPS: Historic Fire Stations of Tacoma, Washington TR (64000904)
- NRHP reference No.: 86000962
- Added to NRHP: 2 May 1986

Fire Station No. 14 is a fire station located at 4701 Forty–first Street in Tacoma, Washington. The architect was Morton J. Nicholson and the station was built in 1928 by Martin H. Marker. It was listed on the National Register of Historic Places on May 2, 1986, as part of a thematic group "Historic Fire Stations of Tacoma, Washington.

== Sister Station ==
Fire Station No. 14 shares an architectural and historical lineage with Fire Station No. 10, located at 7247 S. Park Avenue. Built concurrently in 1928, both stations were designed by the same architect, Morton J. Nicholson, and constructed by Martin H. Marker utilizing matching American Craftsman, Bungalow, and period revival design elements.

Intended to blend seamlessly into residential neighborhoods while accommodating modern motorized fire apparatus, Station No. 14 and its sister station, Station No. 10, stand as prime examples of Tacoma's municipal architectural expansion during the late 1920s. Both historic structures were simultaneously added to the National Register of Historic Places on May 2, 1986.

== See also ==
- Historic preservation
- National Register of Historic Places listings in Pierce County, Washington
- Fire Station No. 10 (Tacoma, Washington)

== See also ==
- Historic preservation
- National Register of Historic Places listings in Pierce County, Washington
