= Alderton, Washington =

- CDP
- Interactive map of Alderton, Washington
- Coordinates: 47°10′44″N 122°14′12″W
- Country: United States
- State: Washington
- County: Pierce

Area
  - Total: 5.46 sq mi (14.1 km^{2})
  - Land: 5.32 sq mi (13.8 km^{2})
  - Water: 0.14 sq mi (0.36 km^{2})
- Elevation: 79 ft (24 m)

Population (2010)
  - Total: 2,893
- Time zone: UTC-8 (Pacific (PST))
  - Summer (DST): UTC-7 (PDT)
- ZIP Code: 98374
- Area code(s): 360, 564
- GNIS feature ID: 2584942

Alderton is a census-designated place (CDP) in Pierce County, Washington, United States. As of the 2020 census, Alderton had a population of 3,274. The community is located in the Puyallup River Valley between the cities of Sumner and Orting.

== Geography ==
=== Mount Rainier ===
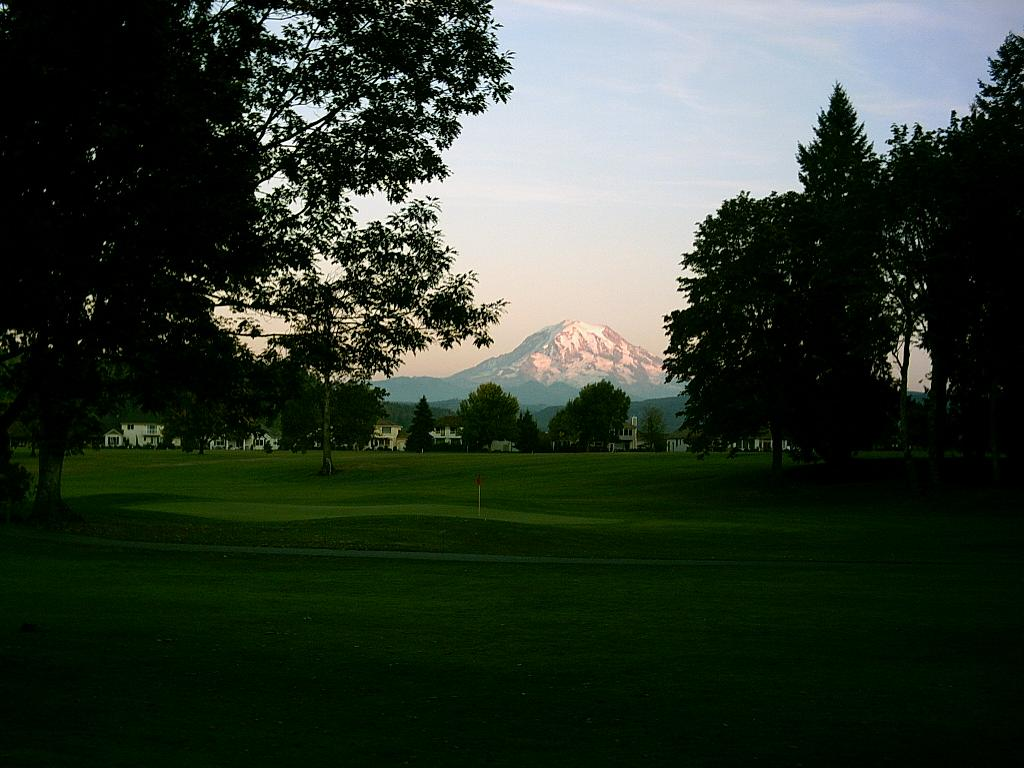
Mount Rainier as seen from the High Cedars Golf Course in Orting, bordering the Puyallup River

The city sits in a fertile valley by the Puyallup. It is built entirely on several layers of lahar deposits. Alderton is located about 30 mi (48 km) from Mount Rainier. Based on studies of past lahar flow and the mountain's structure, the Orting plains of the Puyallup River is designated an at-risk community from Mount Rainier's lahar activity; scientists predict that lahar could reach Orting in 30 minutes and Alderton in an hour. The Mount Rainier Volcano Lahar Warning System has installed sirens throughout the area, activated by sensors on Mount Rainier.

== History ==
The valley where Alderton is located is within the traditional lands of the Puyallup Tribe and the Muckleshoot Tribes. The Puyallup people are one of the Salish people who inhabited the Puget Sound lowlands. They lived by fishing, hunting, and gathering. Salmon are the most significant food source and are held in reverence and incorporated into the traditional ceremony. Permanent villages were located along the riverbank. The Puyallup River valley was an important trading center for many tribes.

The first emigrant wagons arrived in Pierce County in 1853. Some came by way of the Naches Pass trail, a short-cut of the Oregon Trail. Many settled in the Puyallup River valley area including the Woolery and Lane families. The Naches Trail, which led many early emigrants to Pierce County, passed through Alderton and McMillin along the Military Road. It split at Alderton, heading west towards Olympia or north towards Seattle. Homesteaders cleared the land and created subsistence farms which typically included fields where oats, rye, and barley, potatoes, peas, or other vegetables were planted, and pasture for livestock, and orchards with a variety of fruit trees were established. Orson M. Annis (1828-1900) settled in Alderton in 1969. The post office was established at Alderton on April 12, 1878 and closed on October 9, 1964. The vacant brick gymnasium and school building were built in 1915, visible along Military Road (Washington Route 162 at its junction with North 96th Street East. The old General Store stands across N 96th E, south of the school. Two historic farms continue to operate, the Spooner Farm since 1930 and the Cavelti Farm since 1938.

According to the United States Census Bureau, the CDP has a total area of 5.46 square miles (8.4 km^{2}), of which, 5.32 square miles (8.3 km^{2}) of it is land and 0.14 square miles (0.08 km^{2}) of it (2.55%) is water.

In February 2015, the Tacoma News Tribune reported two families, Sidhu and Alderton LLC, purchased 116 acres of Alderton farmland located near the Puyallup River and Ball Creek. While Alderton LLC grows mostly Christmas trees, Sidhu grows fruits and vegetables.

== Demographics ==
Historical population
Census	Pop.	Note	%±
2010	2,893		—
2020	3,274		13.2%
U.S. Decennial Census; 2000 2010

Alderton first appeared as a census designated place in the 2010 U.S. census.

=== Racial and ethnic composition ===
Alderton CDP, Washington – Racial and ethnic composition Note: the US Census treats Hispanic/Latino as an ethnic category. This table excludes Latinos from the racial categories and assigns them to a separate category. Hispanics/Latinos may be of any race.
Race / Ethnicity (NH = Non-Hispanic)	Pop 2010	Pop 2020	% 2010	% 2020
White alone (NH)	2,479	2,461	85.69%	75.17%
Black or African American alone (NH)	19	31	0.66%	0.95%
Native American or Alaska Native alone (NH)	26	23	0.90%	0.70%
Asian alone (NH)	62	88	2.14%	2.69%
Native Hawaiian or Pacific Islander alone (NH)	15	10	0.52%	0.31%
Other race alone (NH)	13	7	0.45%	0.21%
Mixed race or Multiracial (NH)	71	230	2.45%	7.03%
Hispanic or Latino (any race)	208	424	7.19%	12.95%
Total	2,893	3,274	100.00%	100.00%
