= Fire Station No. 15 (Tacoma, Washington) =

- U.S. National Register of Historic Places
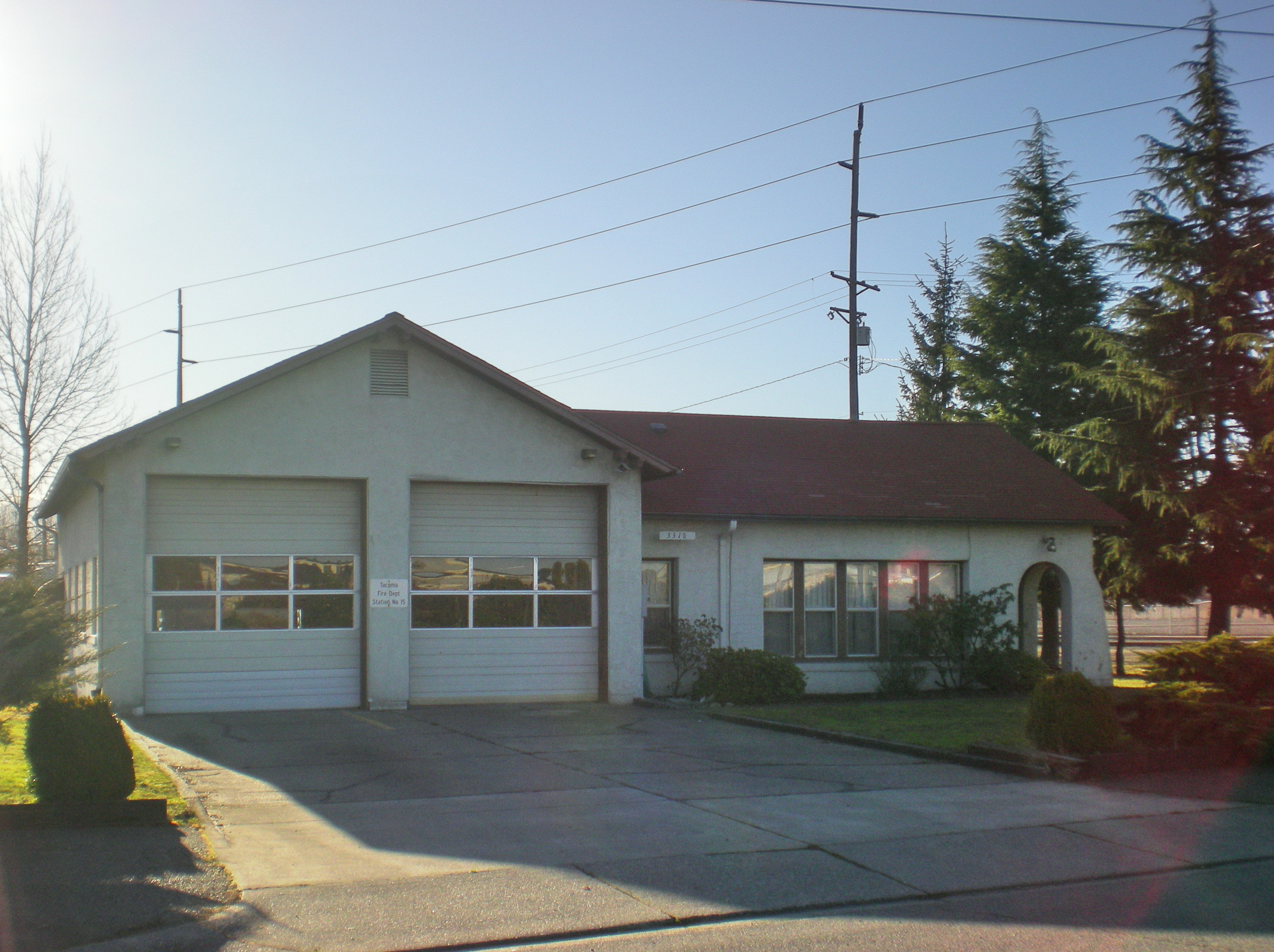
- Fire Station No. 15 in Tacoma, Washington

- Location within Washington (state)
- Location: 3510 E. Eleventh St., Tacoma, Washington
- Coordinates: 47°16′31″N 122°23′47″W
- Area: less than one acre
- MPS: Historic Fire Stations of Tacoma, Washington TR
- NRHP reference No.: 86000961
- Added to NRHP: May 2, 1986

Fire Station No. 15 is a fire station located in Tacoma, Washington listed on the National Register of Historic Places. It was designed by Tacoma architect, M. J. Nicholson, in 1928.

It is no longer in active service since being shuttered when Tacoma relocated Engine 15 to Tacoma's lower east side in 2012, but as of 2017 is being considered for renovation and reopening. Due to the fact that there is now a different active Station 15, this location has been renamed as Station 5 following the closure of the previous Station 5, a defunct fireboat facility.

== See also ==
- List of National Historic Landmarks in Washington (state)
