= Paradise River waterfalls =

Waterfalls in Washington (state), United States

The Paradise River in Washington state, United States, is known for having a total of eight major waterfalls.

== Paradise Falls ==
Paradise Falls
- Location: Mount Rainier, Pierce County, Washington
- Type: Segmented Block
- Total height: 30 feet (9.1 m)
- Number of drops: 1
- Total width: 30 feet (9.1 m)
- Watercourse: Paradise River

Paradise Falls, at 46°47′54″N 121°43′04″W, is the first waterfall on the Paradise River. The falls are a segmented block and are about 30 feet (9.1 m) high. The Skyline Trail crosses the river a mere 500 feet (150 m) downstream from the base of the falls, however, since off-trail travel isn’t allowed in the area, one has to settle with the mediocre views from the footbridge.

== Sluiskin Falls ==
Sluiskin Falls
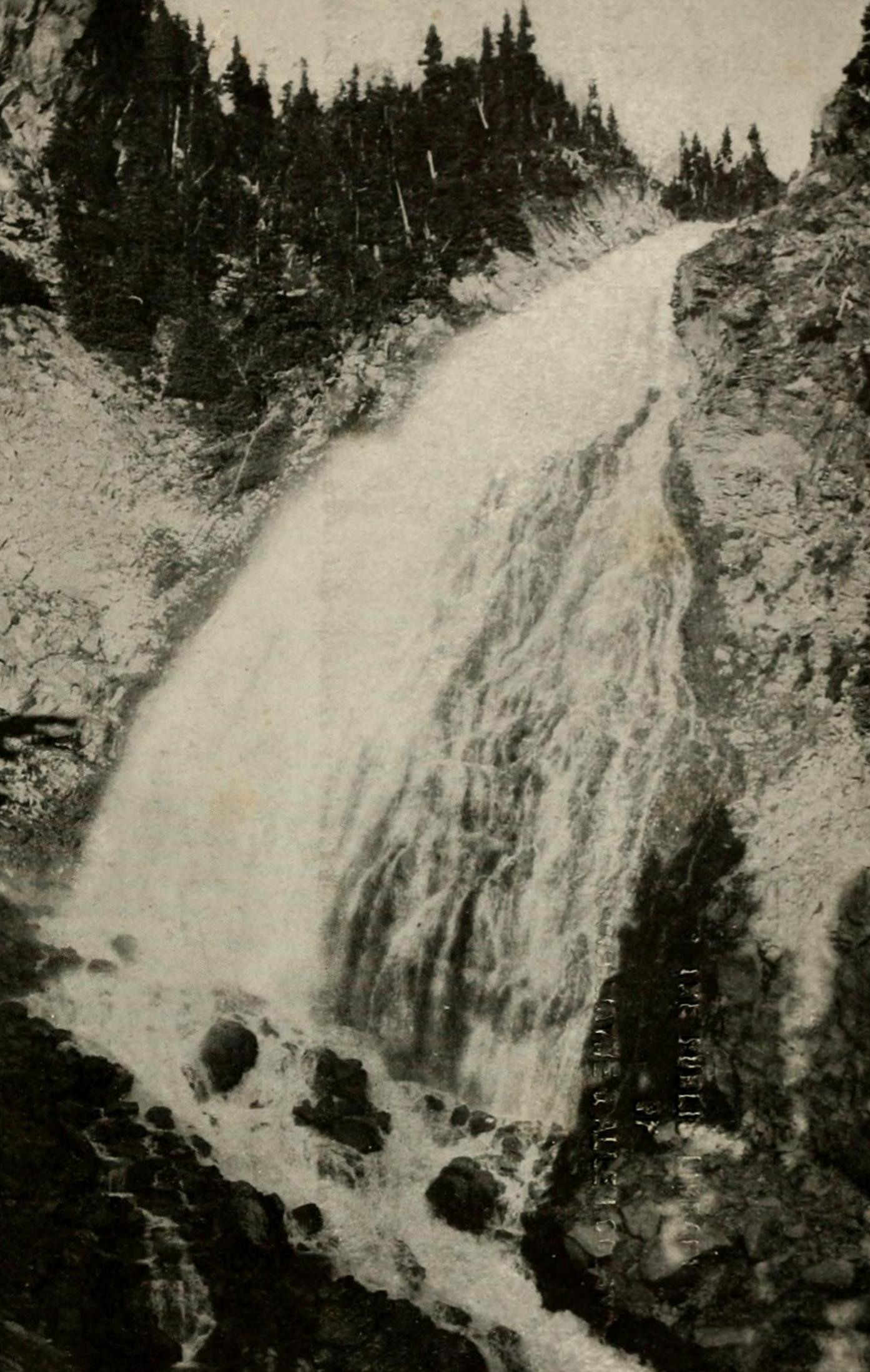
- Sluiskin Falls, c.1912
- Location: Mount Rainier, Pierce County, Washington
- Type: Fan
- Total height: 180 feet (55 m)
- Number of drops: 1
- Total width: 50 feet (15 m)
- Watercourse: Paradise River

Sluiskin Falls, at 46°47′36″N 121°43′02″W, is the second tallest waterfall on the Paradise. It is only 8 feet (2.4 m) shorter than Narada Falls. The falls occur where the river, still small at this point, drops into Paradise Valley. The falls are about 180 feet (55 m) high and about 50 feet (15 m) wide.

Like Paradise Falls, it would be very easy to reach the base of the falls however, since off trail travel isn’t allowed, one has to stick with long distance views from the trail.

General Hazard Stevens and Philemon Beecher Van Trump were the ones who named the falls. They named it after a local Indian named Sluiskin who guided them to the first ascent of Mount Baker in 1870.

== Ruby Falls ==
Ruby Falls
- Location: Mount Rainier, Lewis County, Washington
- Type: Tiered
- Total height: 30 feet (9.1 m)
- Number of drops: 2
- Total width: 20 feet (6.1 m)
- Watercourse: Paradise River

Ruby Falls, at 46°46′42″N 121°44′21″W, is the first major waterfall on the Paradise River after it exits Paradise Valley. One of the most forgotten waterfalls in the area, Ruby Falls consists of 2 major tiers, first a 15-foot (4.6 m) cascade and then a 15-foot (4.6 m) plunge. There is a bridge situated between the 2 tiers. The falls are located about 200 feet (61 m) upstream from the top of the Washington Cascades.

The upper tier can easily be seen from the bridge while one can get good views of the lower tier by walking about 100 feet (30 m) downstream from the bridge along the Narada Falls Trail.

== Washington Cascades ==
Washington Cascades
- Location: Mount Rainier, Lewis County, Washington
- Type: Cascade
- Total height: 100 feet (30 m)
- Number of drops: 5
- Total width: 10 feet (3.0 m)
- Watercourse: Paradise River

The Washington Cascades, at 46°46′41″N 121°44′26″W, are a series of cascades along the Paradise River that start about 200 feet (61 m) downstream from the base of Ruby Falls. The falls are a long series of cascades that drop about 100 feet (30 m) over the stretch of 100 yards. No single drop is higher than 30 feet.

Henry Schwargel named the falls in 1893 for the state of Washington. Some sources call the falls the "Washington Torrents" and one early postcard identified them as the "Seven Sisters Falls".

== Sidewinder Cascades ==
Sidewinder Cascades
- Location: Mount Rainier, Lewis County, Washington
- Type: Cascade
- Total height: 60 feet (18 m)
- Number of drops: 3
- Total width: 20 feet (6.1 m)
- Watercourse: Paradise River

The Sidewinder Cascades, at 46°46′24″N 121°44′58″W, are a series of cascades a short distance downstream from Narada Falls. The falls are about 60 feet (18 m) high and drop that in 3 tiers, the bottom one being the largest at about 25 feet (7.6 m), dropping into a bunch of boulders.

== Madcap Falls ==
Madcap Falls
- Location: Mount Rainier, Lewis County, Washington
- Type: Cascade
- Total height: 25 feet (7.6 m)
- Number of drops: 1
- Total width: 10 feet (3.0 m)
- Watercourse: Paradise River

Madcap Falls, at 46°45′55″N 121°46′02″W, is a small 25-foot (7.6 m) high cascade located a short distance downstream from the mouth of Tatoosh Creek.

Most topo maps have placed Madcap Falls at incorrect locations along the river. Some show the falls right at the mouth of Tatoosh Creek, however it has been proved there is no waterfall there. There is a possibility that the waterfall currently known as Carter Falls is actually Madcap Falls, and Carter Falls lies further downstream.

== Carter Falls ==
Carter Falls
- Location: Mount Rainier, Lewis County, Washington
- Type: Plunge
- Total height: 55 feet (17 m)
- Number of drops: 1
- Total width: 10 feet (3.0 m)
- Watercourse: Paradise River

Carter Falls, at 46°45′54″N 121°46′07″W, is the final of the 9 waterfalls along the Paradise River. It is about 55 feet (17 m) tall and occurs when the river simply plunges 55 feet (17 m) out of a narrow chute. There is a small upper tier of an unknown height just above the main drop.

There is a possibility that the actual Carter falls lies further downstream and that the waterfall currently known as Carter Falls is Madcap Falls.

Henry Carter, who built the first trail to the Paradise Valley, named the falls between 1889 and 1900.

== See also ==
- Nisqually River
