= Paradise Historic District =

Historic district in Washington, United States

- U.S. National Register of Historic Places
- U.S. Historic district
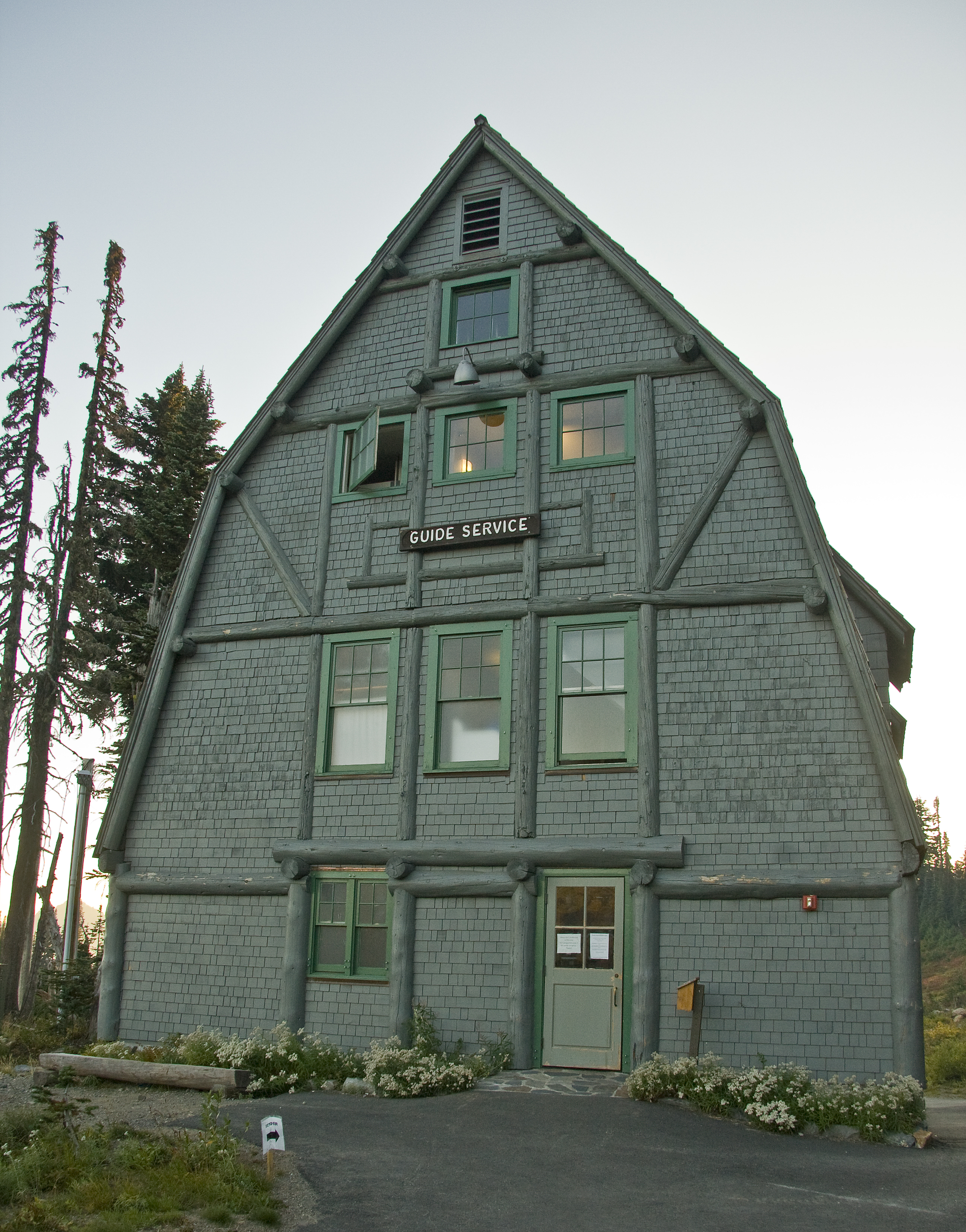
- The Guide Service Building at Paradise

- Location within Washington (state)
- Location: Mt. Rainier National Park, Paradise, Washington
- Coordinates: 46°47′11″N 121°44′4″W
- Area: 10 acres (4.0 ha)
- Architectural style: Rustic style
- MPS: Mt. Rainier National Park MPS
- NRHP reference No.: 91000174
- Added to NRHP: March 13, 1991

The Paradise Historic District comprises the historic portion of Paradise developed area of Mount Rainier National Park. The subalpine district surrounds its primary structure, the Paradise Inn, a rustic-style hotel built in 1917 to accommodate visitors to the park. The Paradise Inn is a National Historic Landmark. Five other buildings are included in the district. The district was placed on the National Register of Historic Places on March 13, 1991. It is part of the Mount Rainier National Historic Landmark District, which encompasses the entire park and which recognizes the park's inventory of Park Service-designed rustic architecture.

== District ==
The Paradise area had been burned by an 1885 forest fire that left a great deal of standing timber in a "silver forest", primarily Alaska Cedar. Much of this timber was harvested to build park structures, particularly the Paradise Inn. The area's chief attractions are the wildflower meadows above the built-up area. The development of the area was undertaken by the Rainier National Park Company, which built the Paradise Inn in 1917 and added the annex in 1920, as well as the Guide House the same year. Three other buildings were built by the National Park Service.

The Paradise area formerly included a group of 215 frame cabins built in 1930, served by the Paradise Lodge of 1931, which were open year-round. The cabins were sold in 1942 to be used to house defense workers. As part of the Mission 66 program, the Paradise area was proposed as a day-use area, with the inn to be demolished. Public pressure resulted in the preservation of the inn and its renovation. The Paradise Lodge was intentionally burned on June 3, 1965, to make room for parking for the new Paradise Visitor Center.

== Buildings ==
The 1917 Paradise Inn is a large hotel with a prominent dormered roof, built in an "alpine" variant of the National Park Service Rustic style. The inn's interior features exposed log structure, with a high lobby housing handcrafted log furniture. Fourteen doors open off the lobby to the northeast, flanked by log buttresses that follow the slope of the roof to the ground, carrying the local snow loads. The inn was designed by Heath, Grove and Bell, of Tacoma. Twenty-eight guest rooms were in an attached wing above the dining room, with a further wing housing suites and rooms.

The Paradise Inn Annex was built in 1920, slightly downhill from and parallel to the main inn's lobby. The 3 1/2-story timber-frame building is connected to the main inn by a multi-story bridge. Designed by Seattle architect Harlan Thomas, the version finally constructed was scaled down from the originally-proposed structure, which was to be 300 feet (91 m) long with a central stone pavilion and exposed log framing. The portion that was built was to have been the south wing, and construction was simplified to plain framed construction, measuring 44 feet (13 m) by 125 feet (38 m).

The Guide Service Building is a 3 1/2-story timber-frame structure opposite the Paradise Inn. It was built by the Rainier National Park Company in 1920 features a distinctive gambrel roof to house mountain climbing guides. The basement contains a small auditorium and stage, while the ground floor houses offices. The upper levels are dormitory spaces.

The Paradise Ranger Station is a small 1 1/2-story building with a steeply pitched cedar-shingle roof. The ranger station was completed in 1922 to a design by the National Park Service Landscape Engineering Division. The roof, supported on rubblestone walls, was designed to shed the heavy winter snowfall typical of the Paradise area. A system of cables anchored to the hillside resists the downhill pressure of the snow load.

The Paradise Comfort Station is a public toilet facility. It was built in 1928 to a design by the Park Service Western Region Branch of Plans and Designs, supervised by Thomas Chalmers Vint. In contrast to the ranger station, the comfort station features a strongly built low-pitched roof built in reinforced concrete. The walls were clad in stone veneer. The roof was designed to resist a 35 feet (11 m) snow load weighing 35 pounds per cubic foot, for a 1225-pound-per-square-foot loading.

The Paradise Ski-Tow Powerhouse was built to house a portable ski-tow system. Paradise was a significant skiing venue during the 1930s, but the Park Service did not permit a permanent ski lift facility. The ski-tow house was built in 1937 by the Civilian Conservation Corps with a steeply pitched roof similar to that of the ranger station.
