= Paradise Inn (Washington) =

- U.S. National Register of Historic Places
- U.S. National Historic Landmark
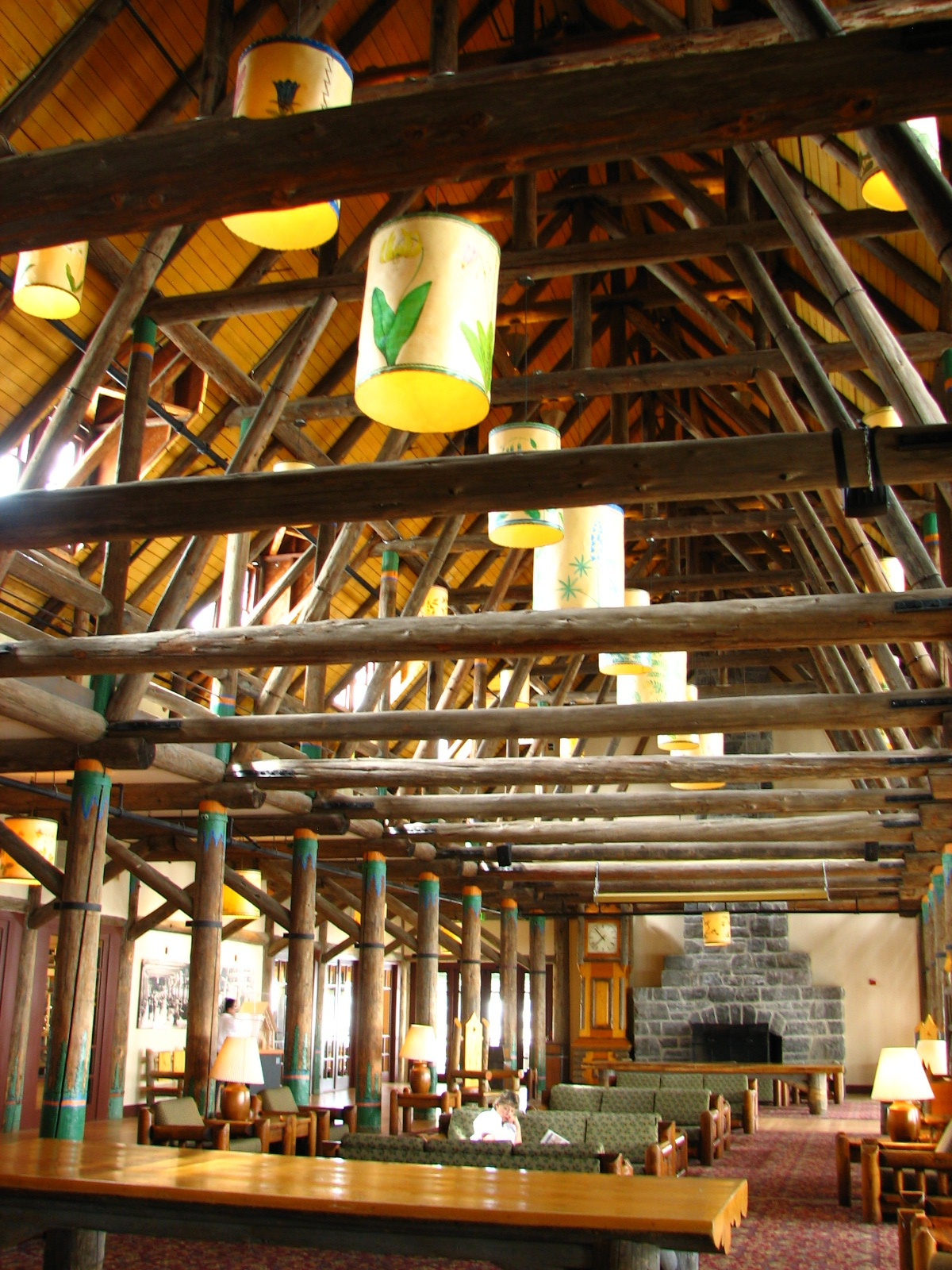
- The Paradise Inn's great room interior

- Location within Washington (state)
- Location: Mount Rainier National Park
- Coordinates: 46°47′5.93″N 121°43′57.51″W
- Built: 1916
- Architect: Grove & Bell Heath, Rainier National Park Co.
- NRHP reference No.: 87001336

Significant dates
- Added to NRHP: May 28, 1987
- Designated NHL: May 28, 1987

Paradise Inn is a historic hotel built in 1916 at 5,400-foot (1,600 m) on the south slope of Mount Rainier in Mount Rainier National Park in Washington, United States. The inn is named after Paradise, the area of the mountain in which it is located. The Henry M. Jackson Visitor Center and the 1920 Paradise Guide House are also at this location. The inn and guide house are where many climbers start their ascent of the mountain. The inn is listed in the National Register of Historic Places and is a major component of the Paradise Historic District. Additionally, it is part of the Mount Rainier National Historic Landmark District, which encompasses the entire park and which recognizes the park's inventory of National Park Service rustic architecture.

== History ==
The inn was designed by Frederick Heath of Heath, Gove & Bell in 1915. It was initially planned to be built at Longmire. The National Park Service moved the planned location to Paradise when the original financier, John Reese, backed away from the project. The inn was built by the Rainier National Park Company, founded by Steven T. Mather, assistant to the Secretary of the Interior.

Native building materials were used including cedar shingles, native rock and weathered timbers salvaged from a fire in 1885. After 30 years of aging the timbers had developed a silver sheen. The original plan called for a red roof but the Park Service vetoed this in favor of a green roof which blended in with the natural environment. This is in keeping with the National Park Service Rustic style of architecture. The inn opened on July 1, 1917 and cost between $90,000 and $100,000.

The lodge is built with exposed cedar logs that provide its structural framework. It includes French doors in 14 bays to "allow summer breezes to enter" and dormer windows for natural lighting to enter on the second story, "augmented by hanging lamps".

In 1920 a four-story Paradise Annex was added. It was designed by RNPC architect Harlan Thomas and contained 100 rooms (85 with private baths).

In 1931 a golf course was designed by Roy H. Dobell and built at the lodge and in 1936 a ski rope tow was installed.

In 1942 to 1943 the US Army used the inn to house troops training for winter mountain conditions.

The extreme elements took their toll on the inn. In 1952 the Rainier National Park Company sold the inn to the National Park Service who contracted with concessionaires to operate the inn. The Park Service considered demolishing the inn but relented after a public outcry. US$1.75 million was spent in 1979 to strengthen and restore the building.

The building was declared a National Historic Landmark in 1987.

== Architecture ==
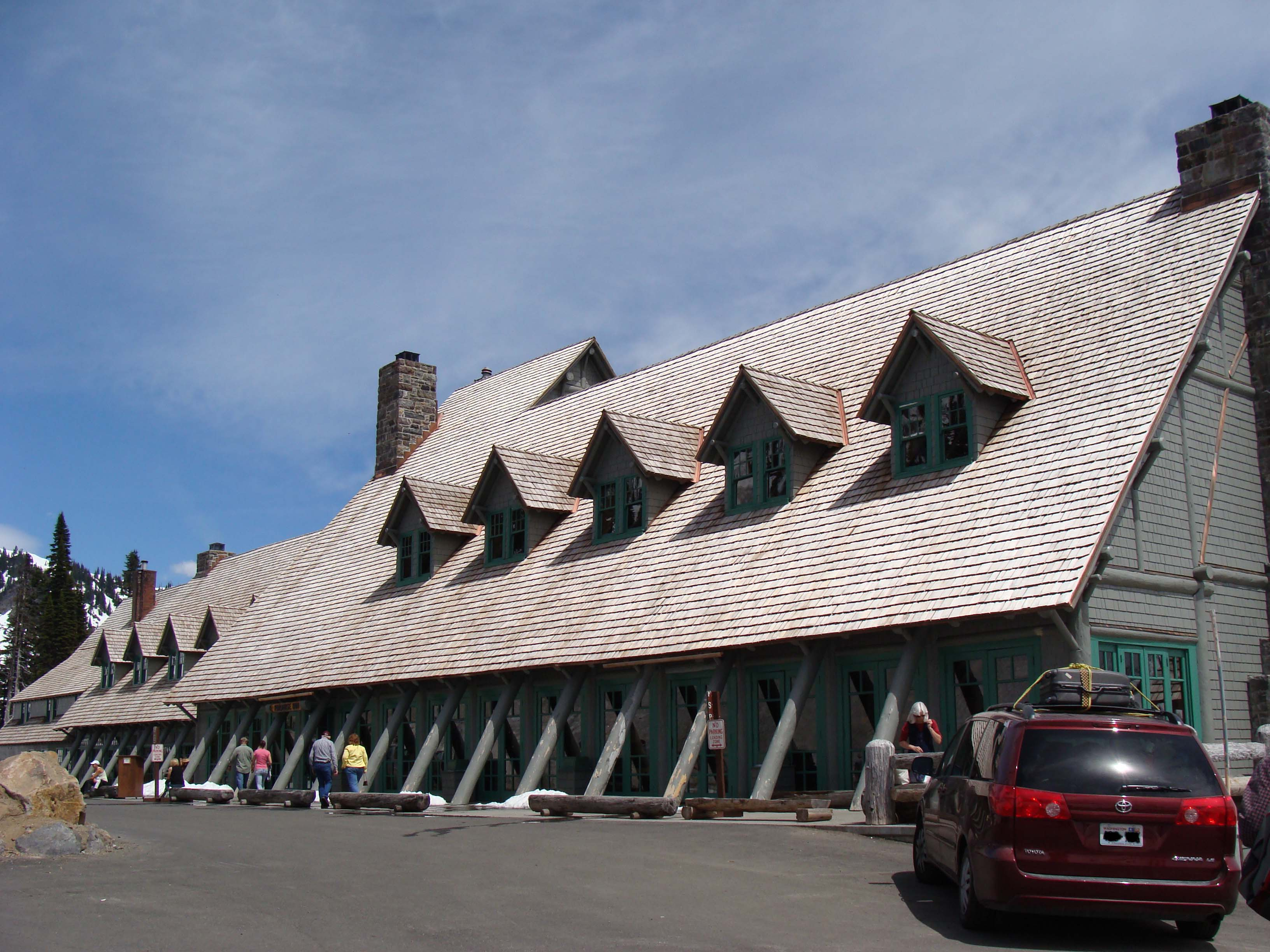
Paradise Inn in 2008 after renovations

The original building is two stories tall. Two rooms, the great hall and the dining room take up most of the ground floor. A three-story section on the building's east side makes the building a T-shape and contains additional guest rooms.

The great hall is 50 by 112 feet (15 m by 34 m) and has a wrap-around mezzanine level. There are 4-by-6 foot (1.2 m by 1.8 m) stone fireplaces at both ends of the room. The mezzanine level was added in 1925.

The dining room is 51 by 105 feet (15.5 m by 32 m) and has a 50 feet (15 m) high stone fireplace. The original guest rooms are above the dining room and are only 8 by 8 feet (2.4 m by 2.4 m). Each one fits between a set of rafters which support the roof.

Hans Fraehnke, a German-born carpenter created furniture from local materials for the inn including two 1,500 pound (680 kg) tables, a 14 feet (4 m) tall grandfather clock and a rustic piano which President Harry S. Truman played on during a visit to the inn in 1945. More tables and chairs are from the Old Hickory Company of Indiana.

== Two Year Closure ==
The inn was closed in 2006 for two years to perform renovations and structural work to allow the inn to withstand a large earthquake. This was done as part of a US$30 million project which also included the groundbreaking for a new visitor center at Paradise. The inn reopened in May 2008.

== Gallery ==
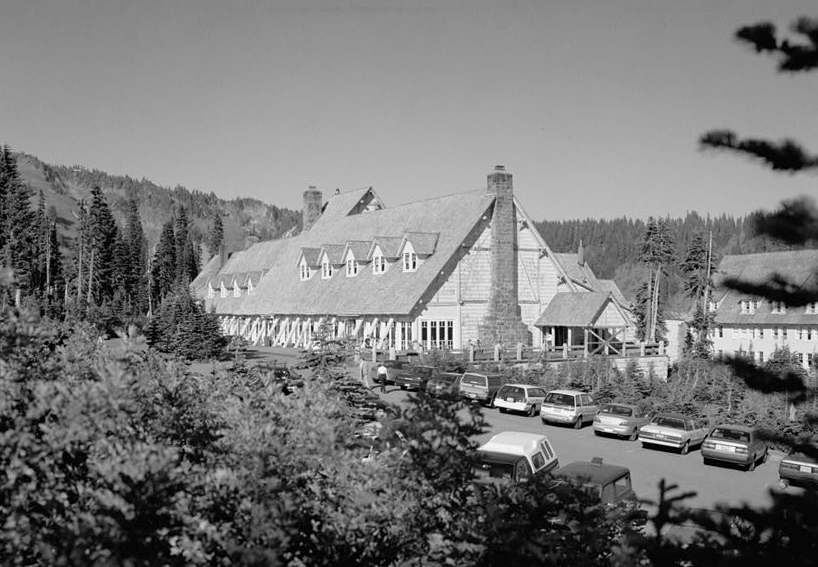

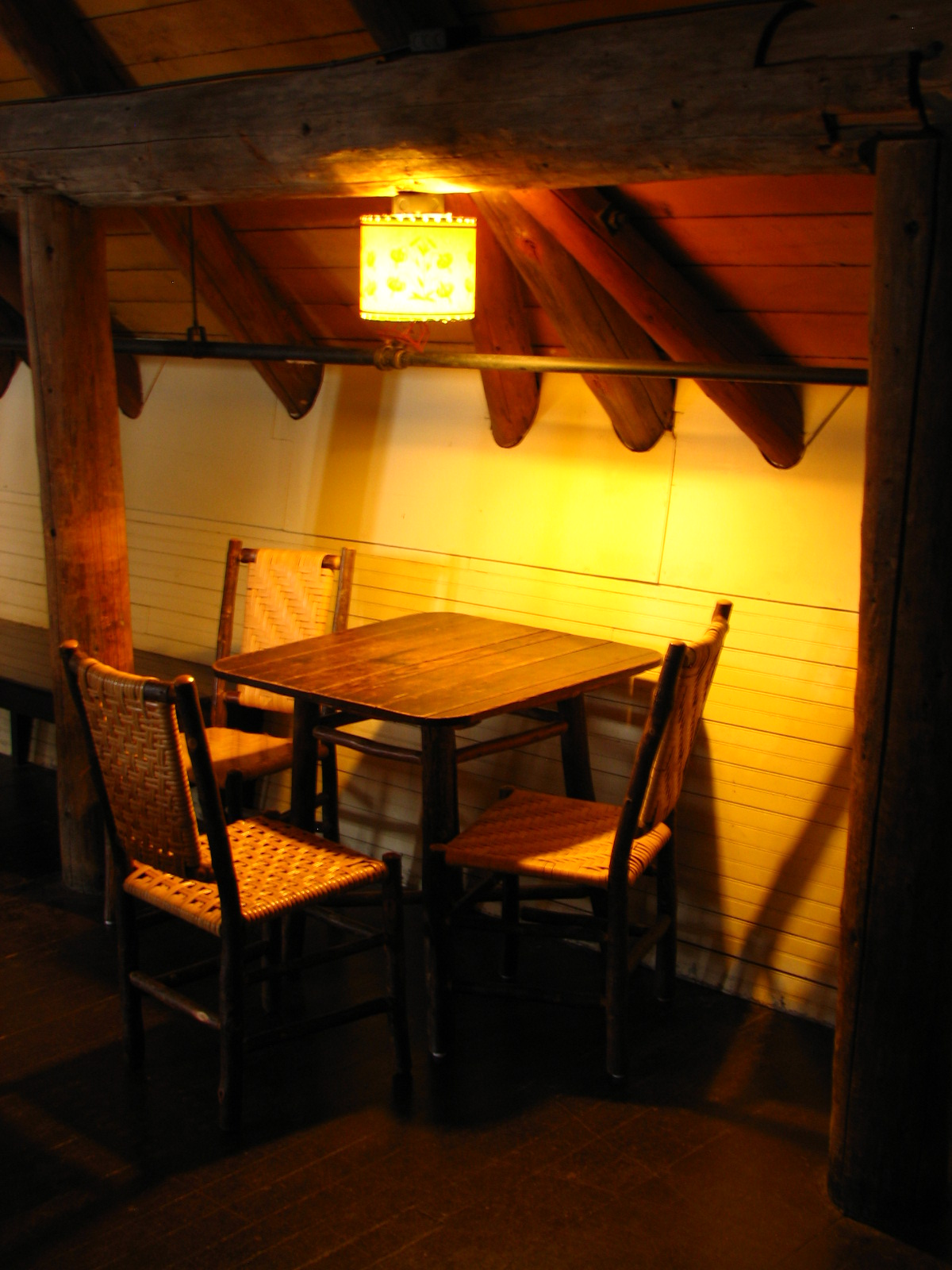

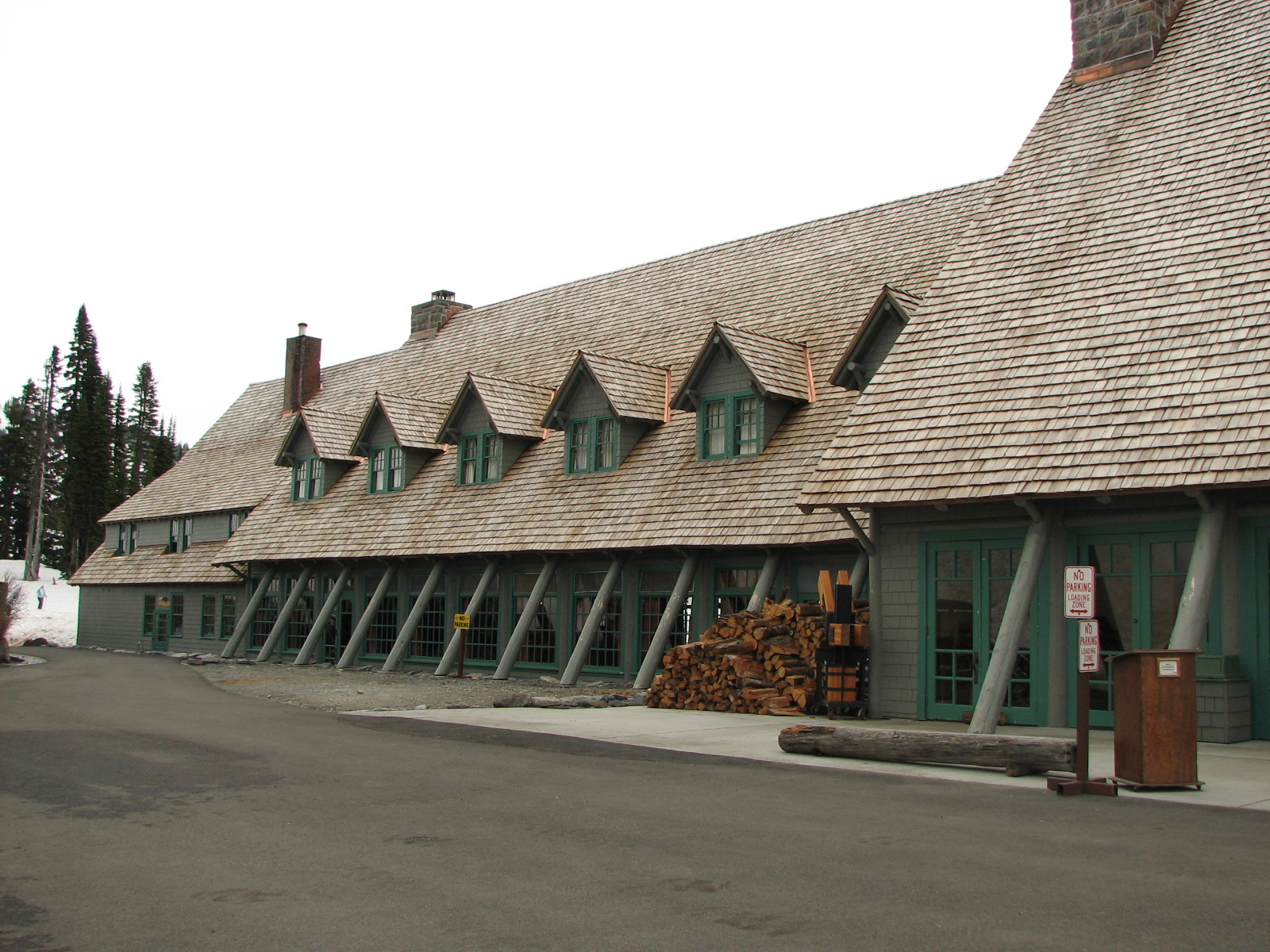

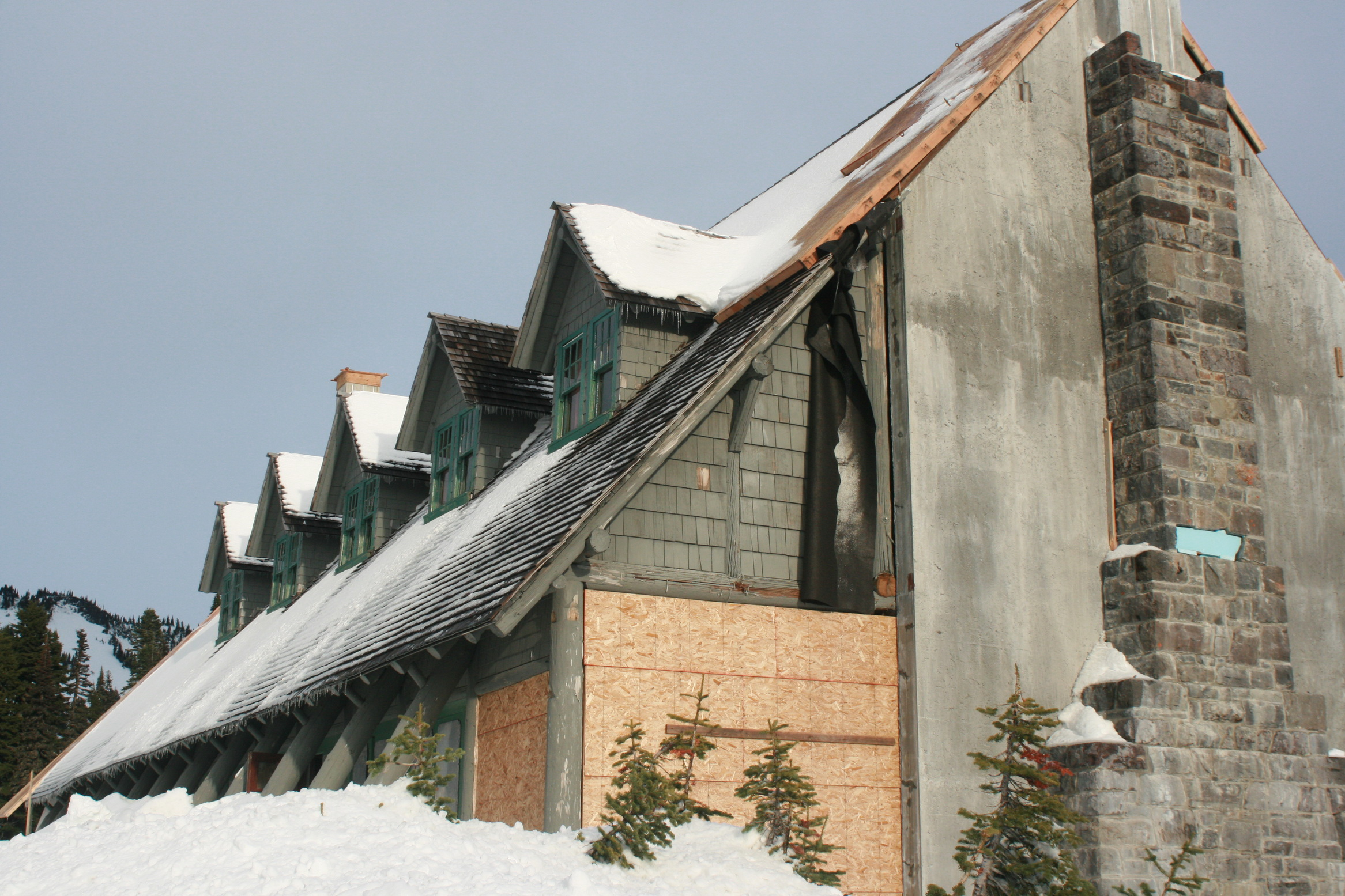

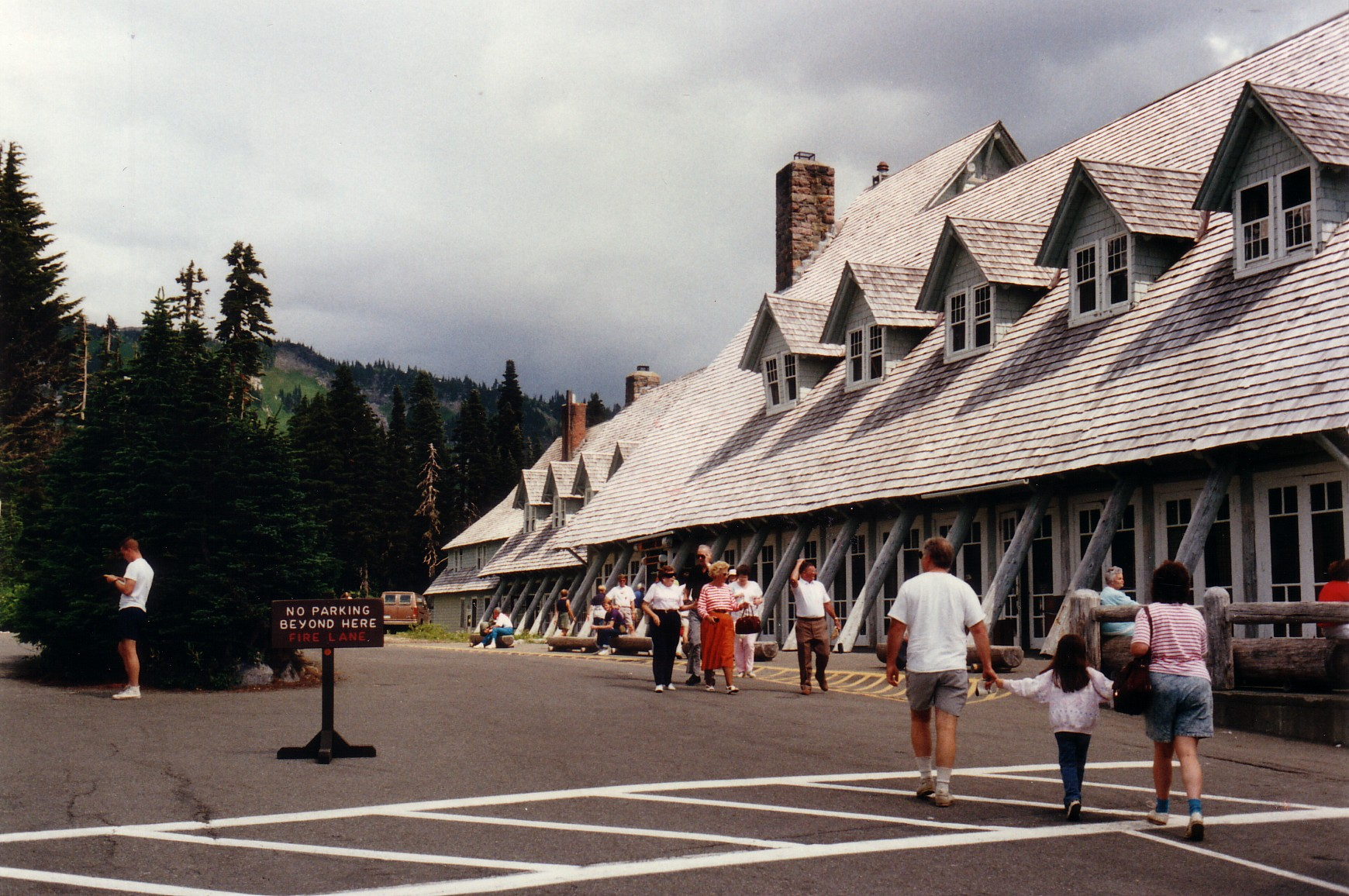
Paradise Inn at Mount Rainier
