= Narada Falls Comfort Station =

NRHP-listed site in Mt. Rainier National Park

- U.S. National Register of Historic Places
- Washington State Heritage Register
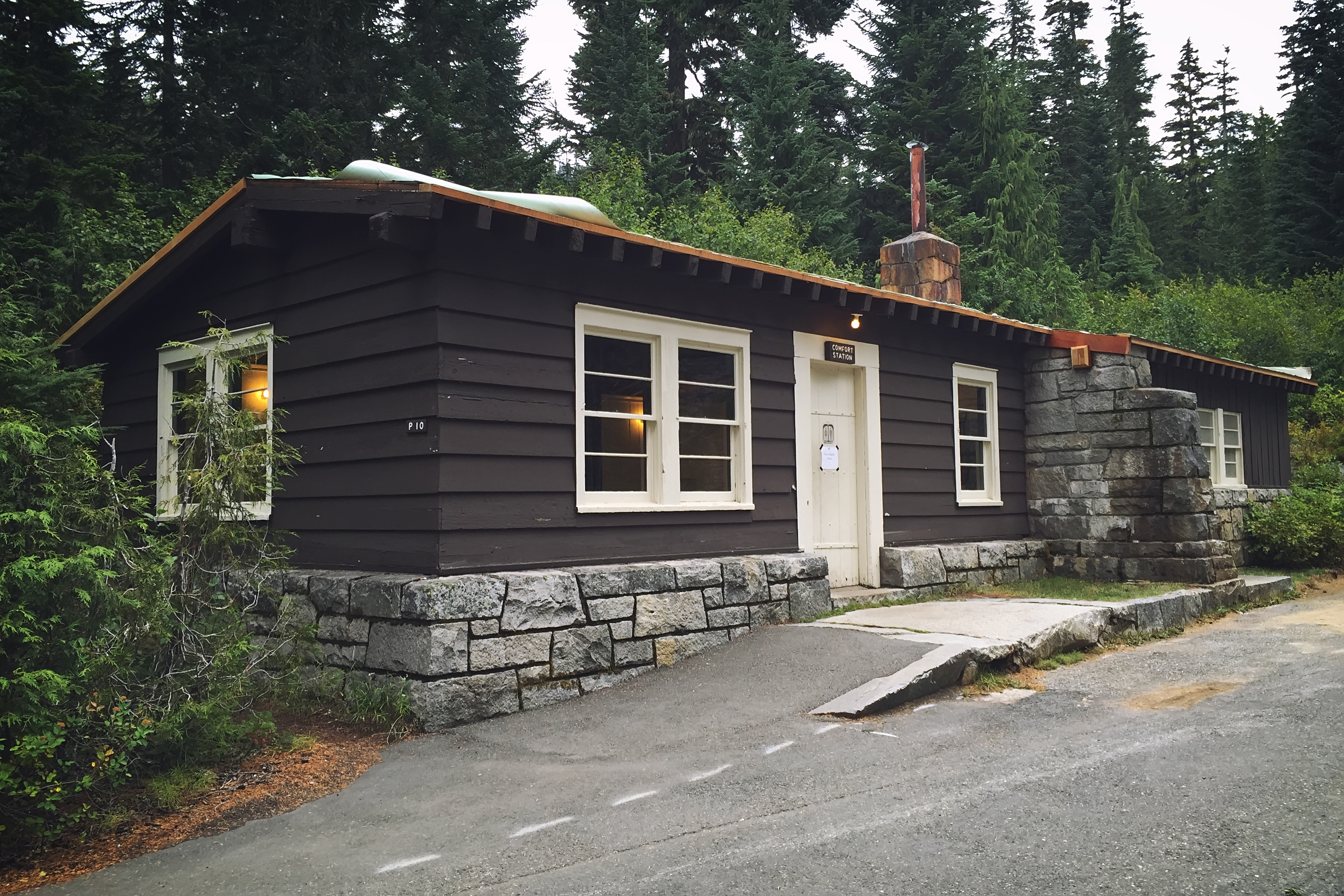
- Narada Falls Comfort Station, 2015

- Location within Washington (state)
- Location: Mt. Rainier National Park
- Nearest city: Paradise, Washington
- Coordinates: 46°46′31.47″N 121°44′44.65″W
- Area: less than one acre
- Built: 1941
- Built by: National Park Service, Civilian Conservation Corps
- Architect: Thomas Chalmers Vint
- Architectural style: National Park Service rustic
- Website: National Park Service - Historic Narada Falls Area
- MPS: Mt. Rainier National Park MPS
- NRHP reference No.: 91000208 (Note: As of 2025, the Narada Falls Comfort Station NRHP file has not been digitized at the National Park Service website. Please review the catalogued inventory form.)

Significant dates
- Added to NRHP: March 13, 1991
- Designated WSHR: March 13, 1991

The Narada Falls Comfort Station is a public restroom situated near Narada Falls in Mount Rainier National Park. Similar to nearby Narada Falls Bridge, the comfort station was added to the National Register of Historic Places in 1991.

Constructed between 1941 and 1942, cost overruns required the combined efforts of the National Park Service and Civilian Conservation Corps to complete the build of the structure. The National Park Service rustic style building, featuring stone masonry and Douglas fir siding, contains a restroom facility and an attached waiting room, known for its bench seating. At the time of the building's historic nomination, the comfort station was considered to be mostly unaltered.

== History ==
Narada Falls Comfort Station was constructed in conjunction with the National Park Service (NPS) and the Civilian Conservation Corps (CCC) between 1941 and 1942. Initial work by the NPS encountered substantial rock excavation with the subsequent cost overrun requiring the use of CCC labor to finish the project; the efforts were successful in completing the comfort station by the opening of the 1942 recreational season.

The design of the station was created under the Western Region Landscape Engineering Division, with plan approval by Thomas Chalmers Vint, NPS Chief of Planning.

== Geography ==
The comfort station is located north of Pinnacle Peak and Plummer Peak and south of Paradise. It lies east of the Nisqually River and northeast of Longmire. The public toilet building is close to Narada Falls in the south central portion of Mt. Rainier National Park.

== Architecture and features ==
The one-story, building was constructed in National Park Service rustic style over a concrete foundation and is split into two sections, a 22 ft × 24 ft (6.7 m × 7.3 m) restroom area and a 19 ft × 30 ft (5.8 m × 9.1 m) waiting room. The structure features stone masonry walls to the window sill level, wood framed upper walls, and a slight-pitched timber framed gable roof with extended eaves. Timber posts support the ridge beam of the station. A stone chimney with a stove pipe flue projects from the roof line; the flue is the only noted alteration of the structure. Siding is lapped Douglas fir, laid horizontal at the entrance section and vertical to the right of a stone break. The partition marks the separation of the toilet facilities and the waiting area. The waiting room section contains windows that are double-hung sashes.

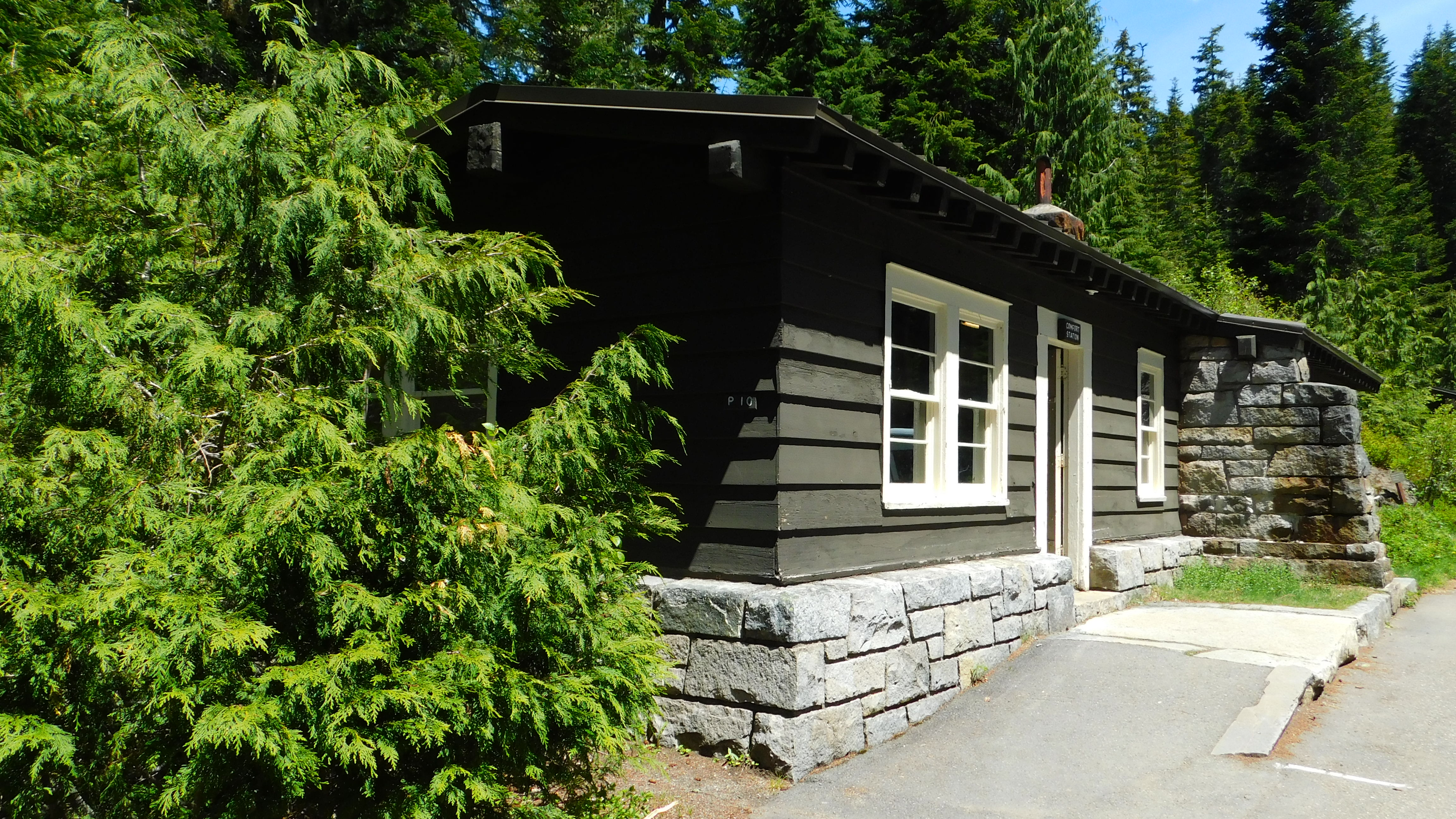
Exterior, 2026

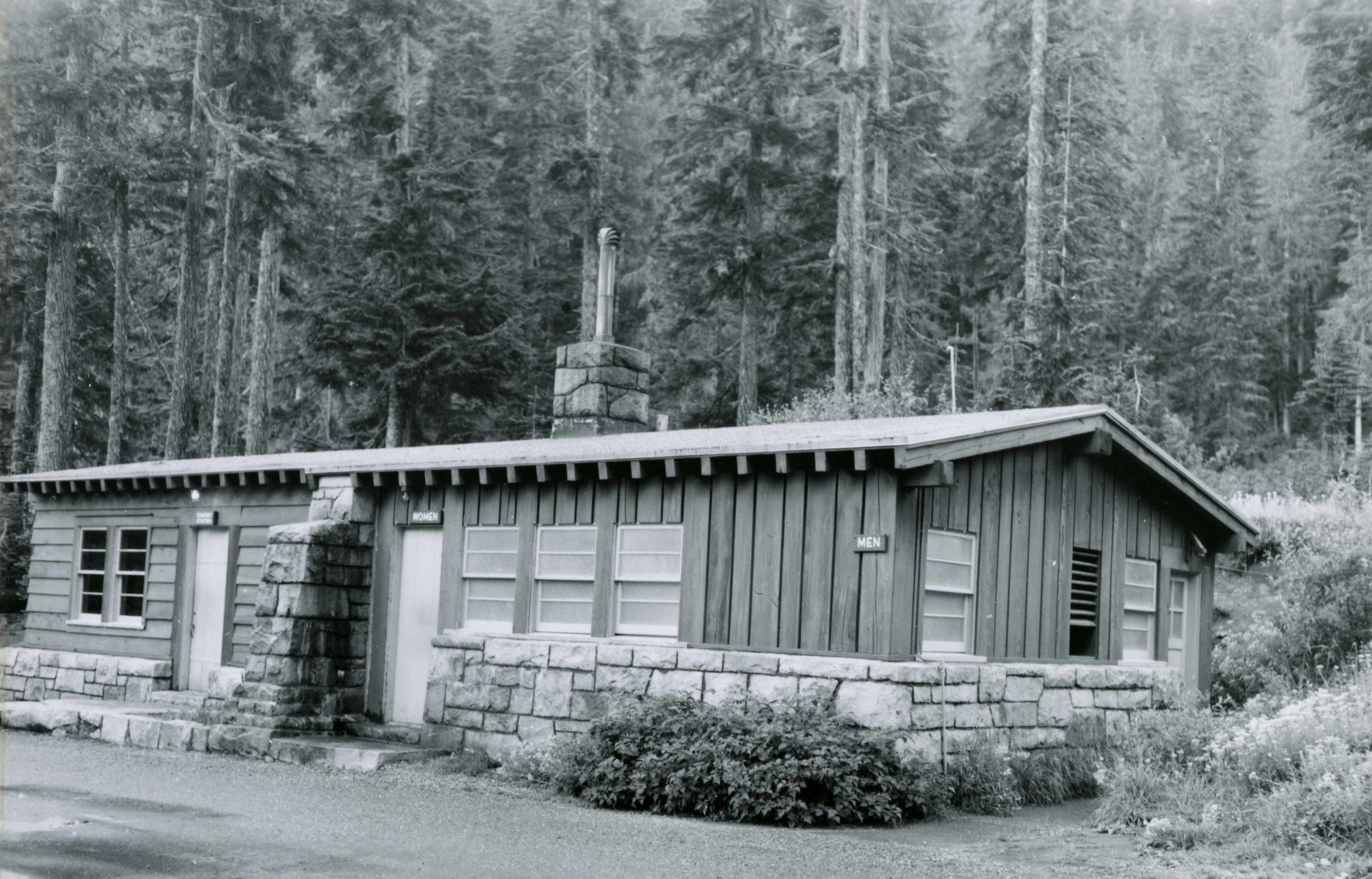
Exterior, 2023

The interior comprises a waiting room and a toilet facility separated by the stone chimney. The floor is concrete and the ceiling is exposed, showcasing thick timber rafters made necessary to carry extensive weight loads from snow accumulation. The walls are tongue-and-groove planks, reported as varnished at the time of the NRHP nomination. A continuous wood bench lines the waiting area walls; individual benches are situated within the floor space.

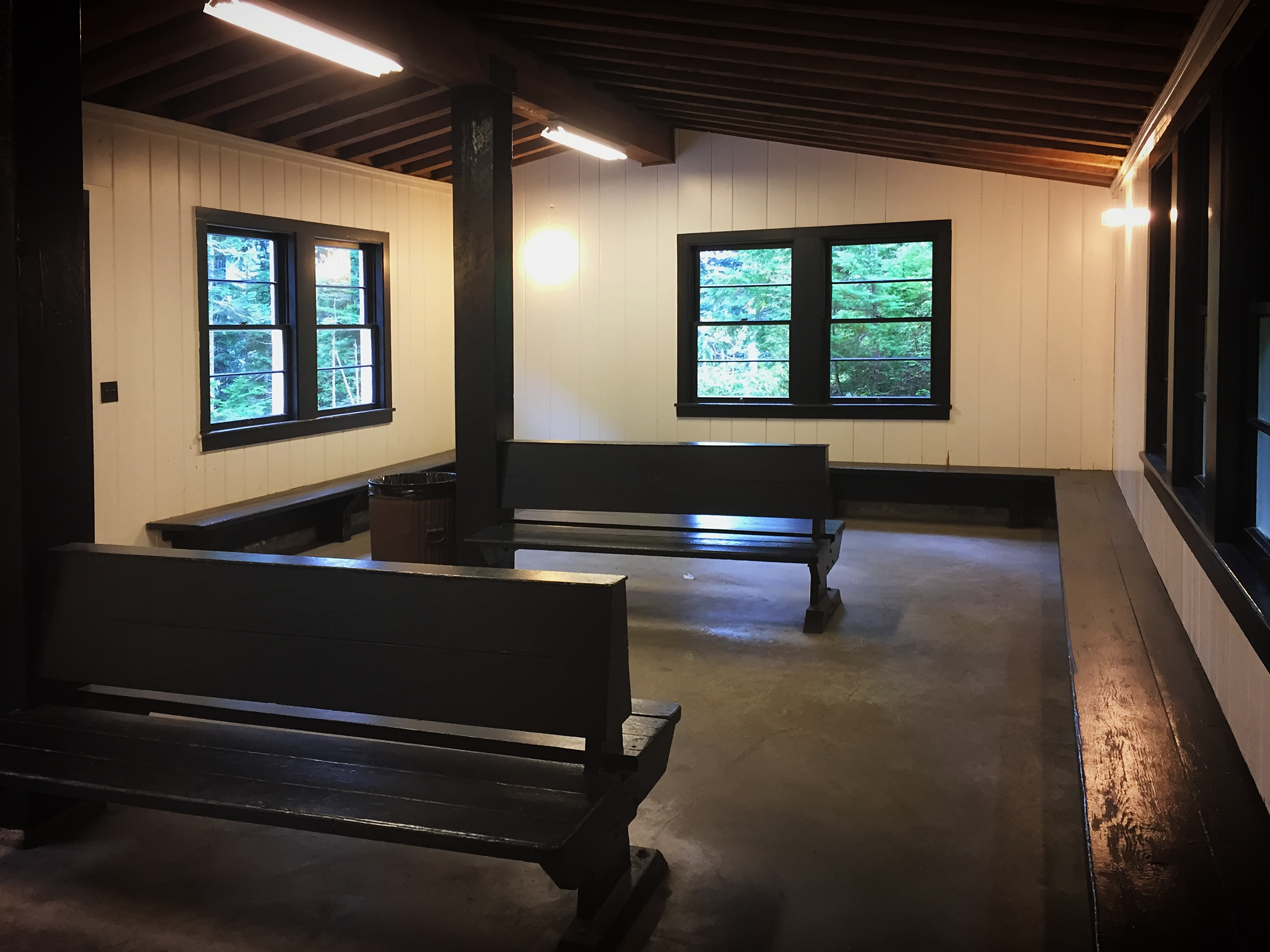
Interior, 2015

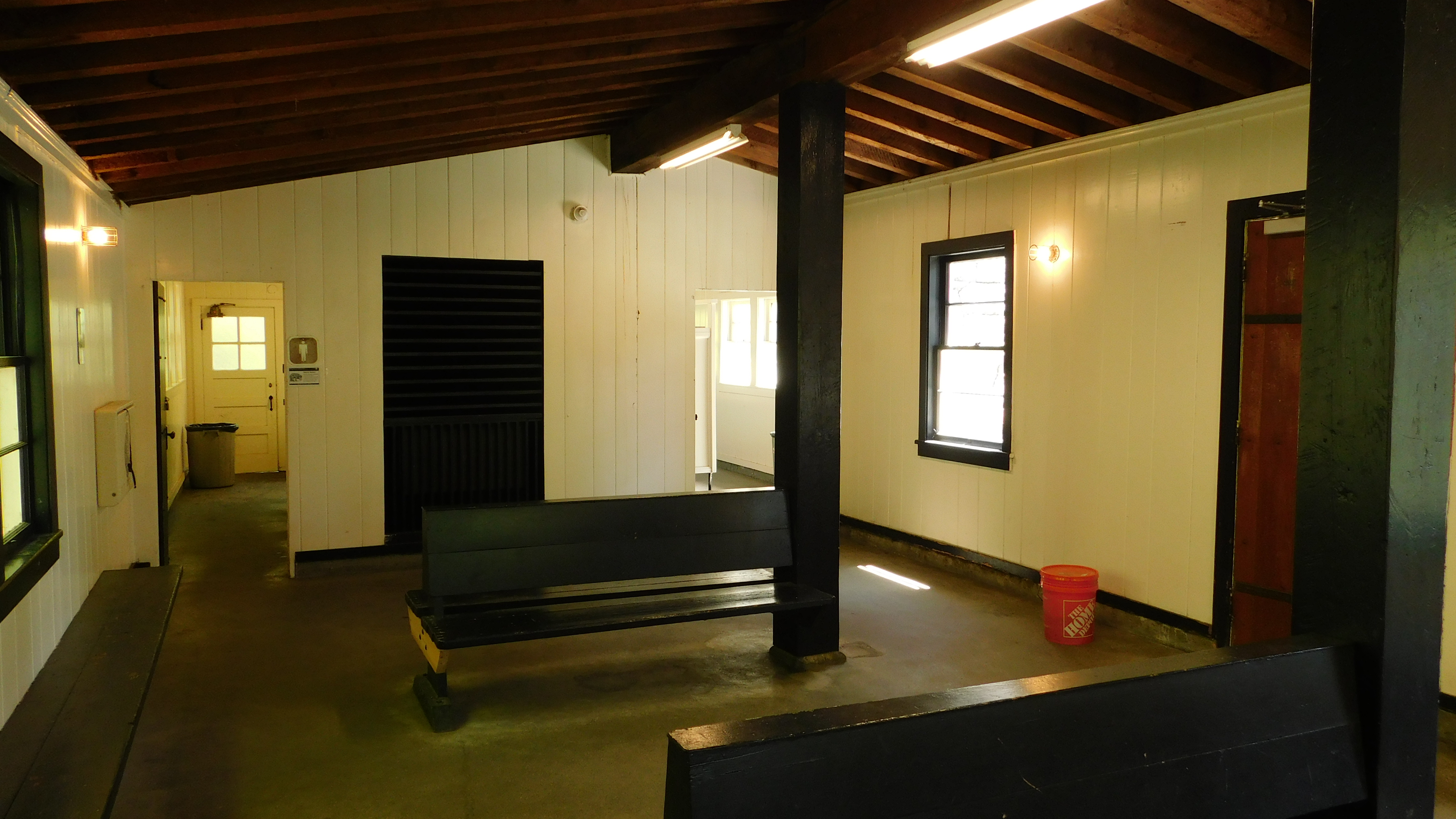
Interior, 2026

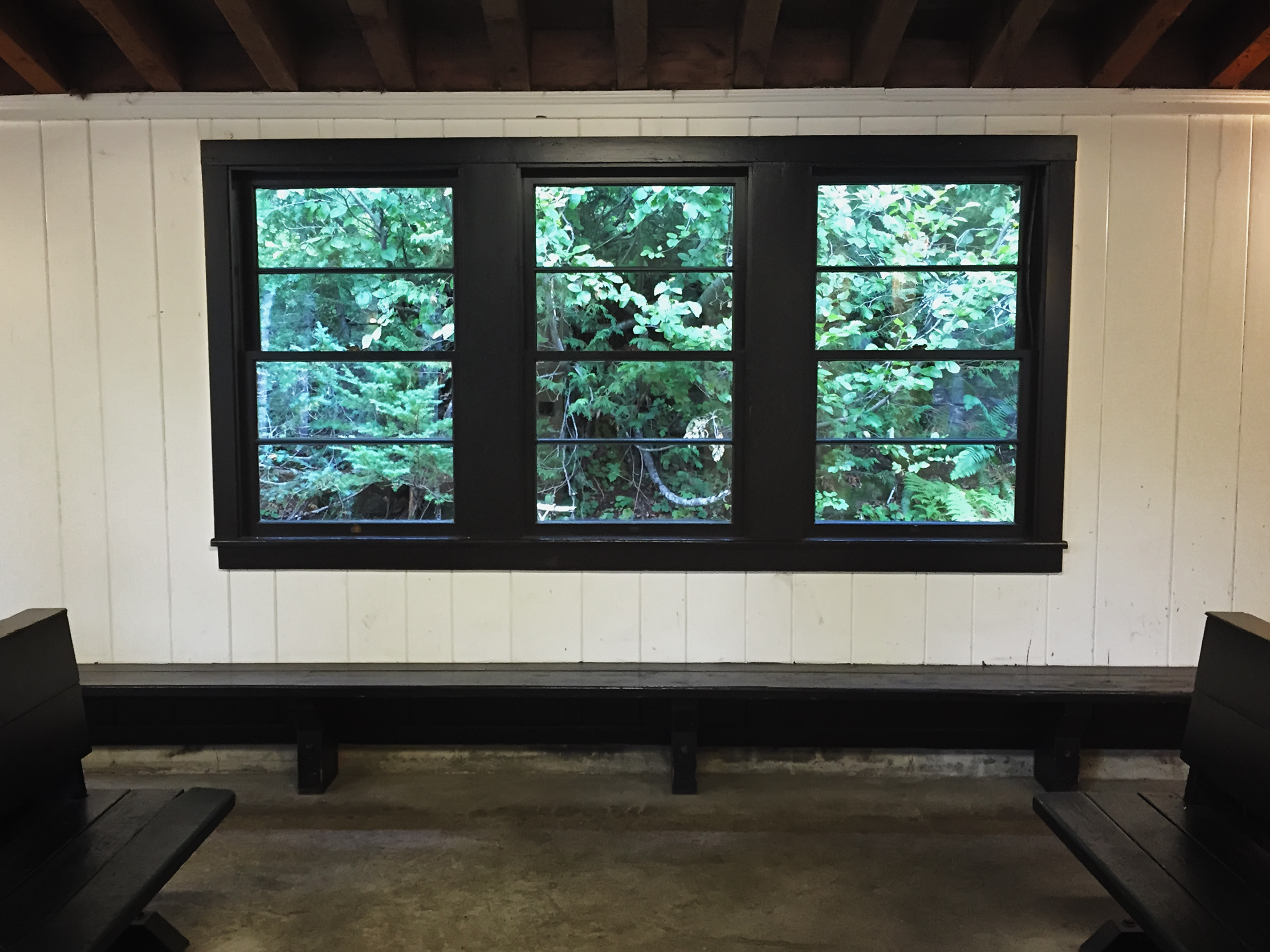
Northwest facing window, 2015

== Recreation ==
The Reflection Lake Snowshoe Trail begins between the comfort station and a nearby maintenance garage. The 4-mile (6.4 km) round-trip hike to the lake usually requires gear such as snowshoes or skis during the winter season.

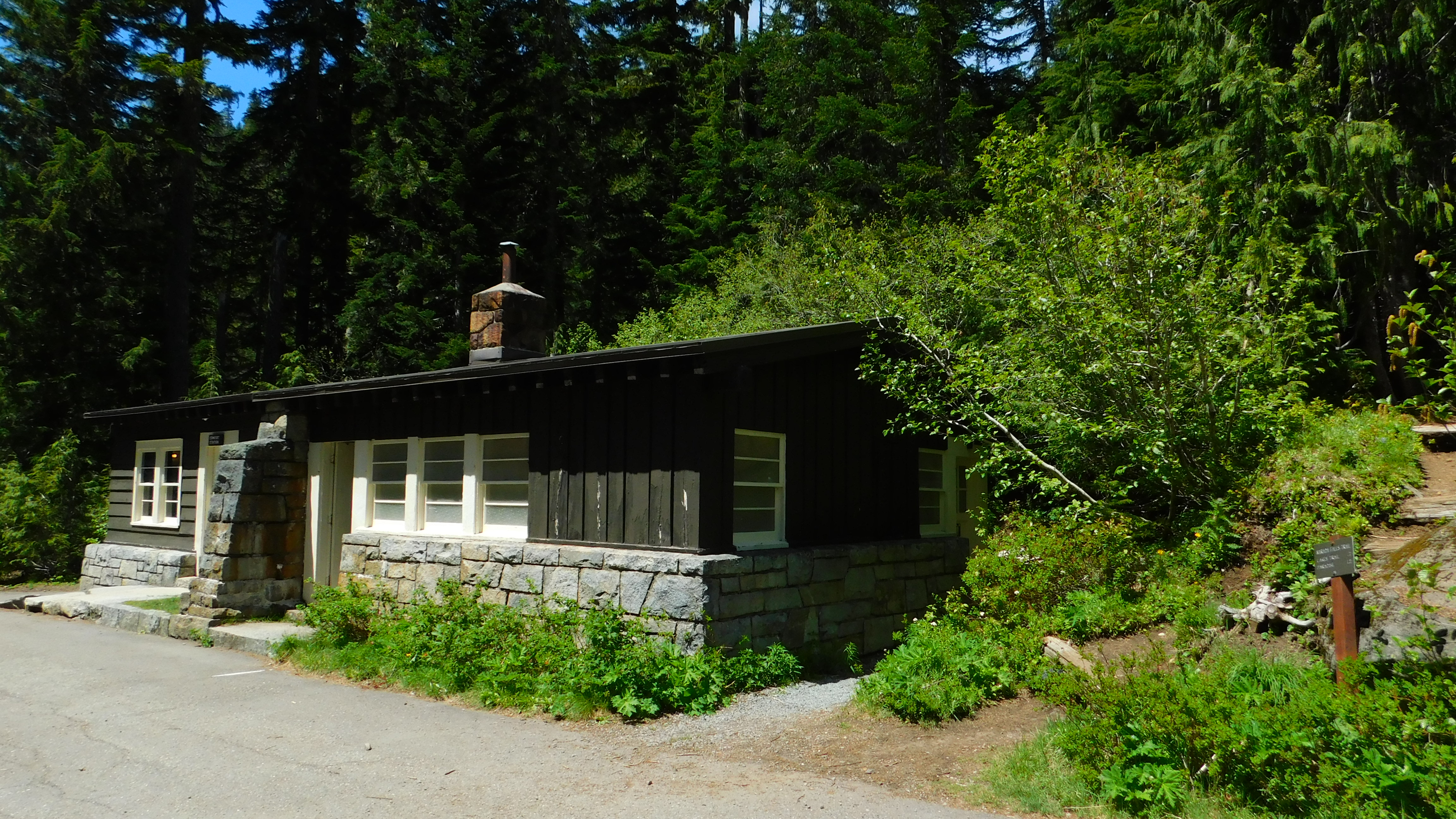
Exterior and trailhead, 2026

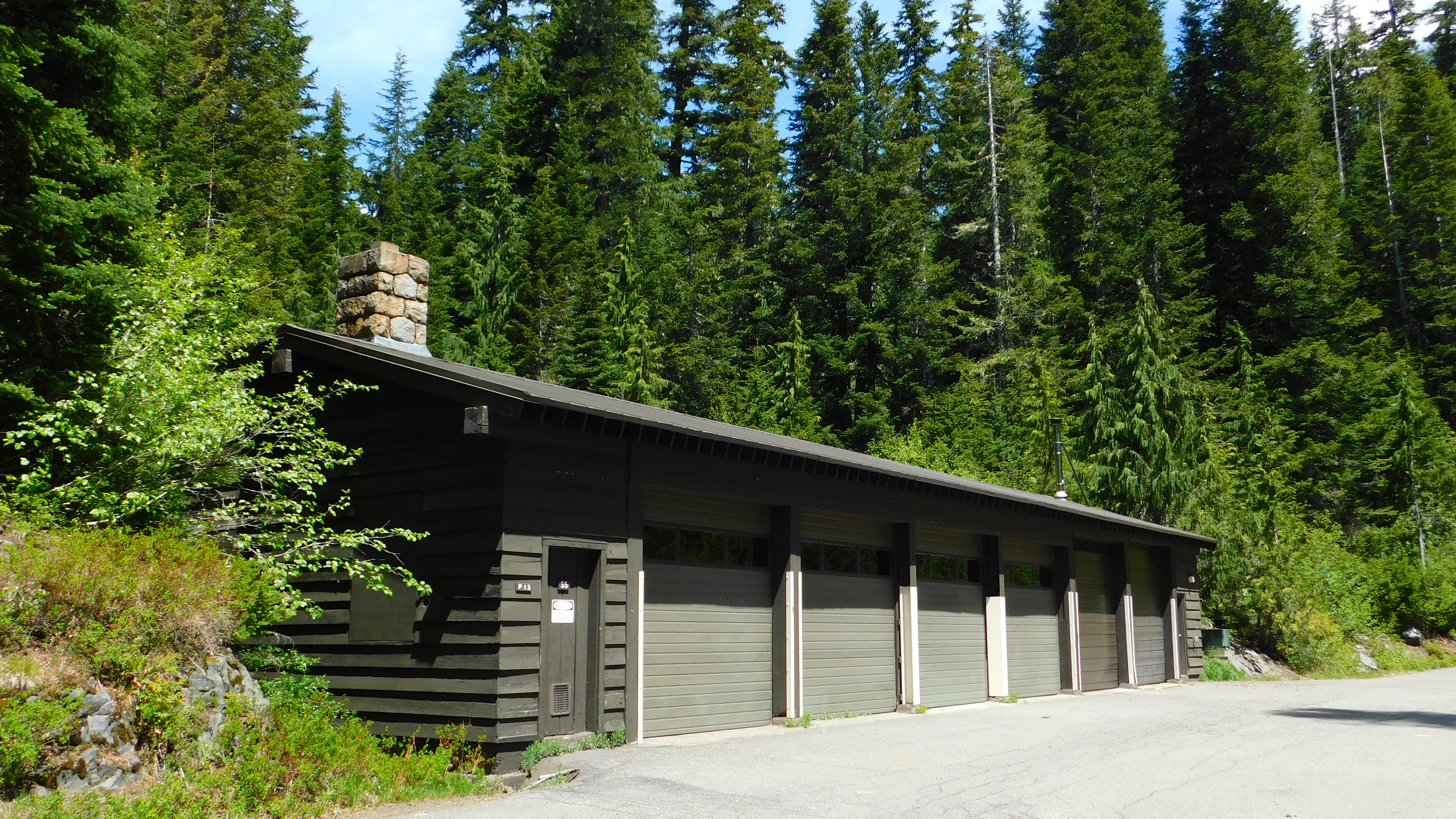
Maintenance garage, 2026

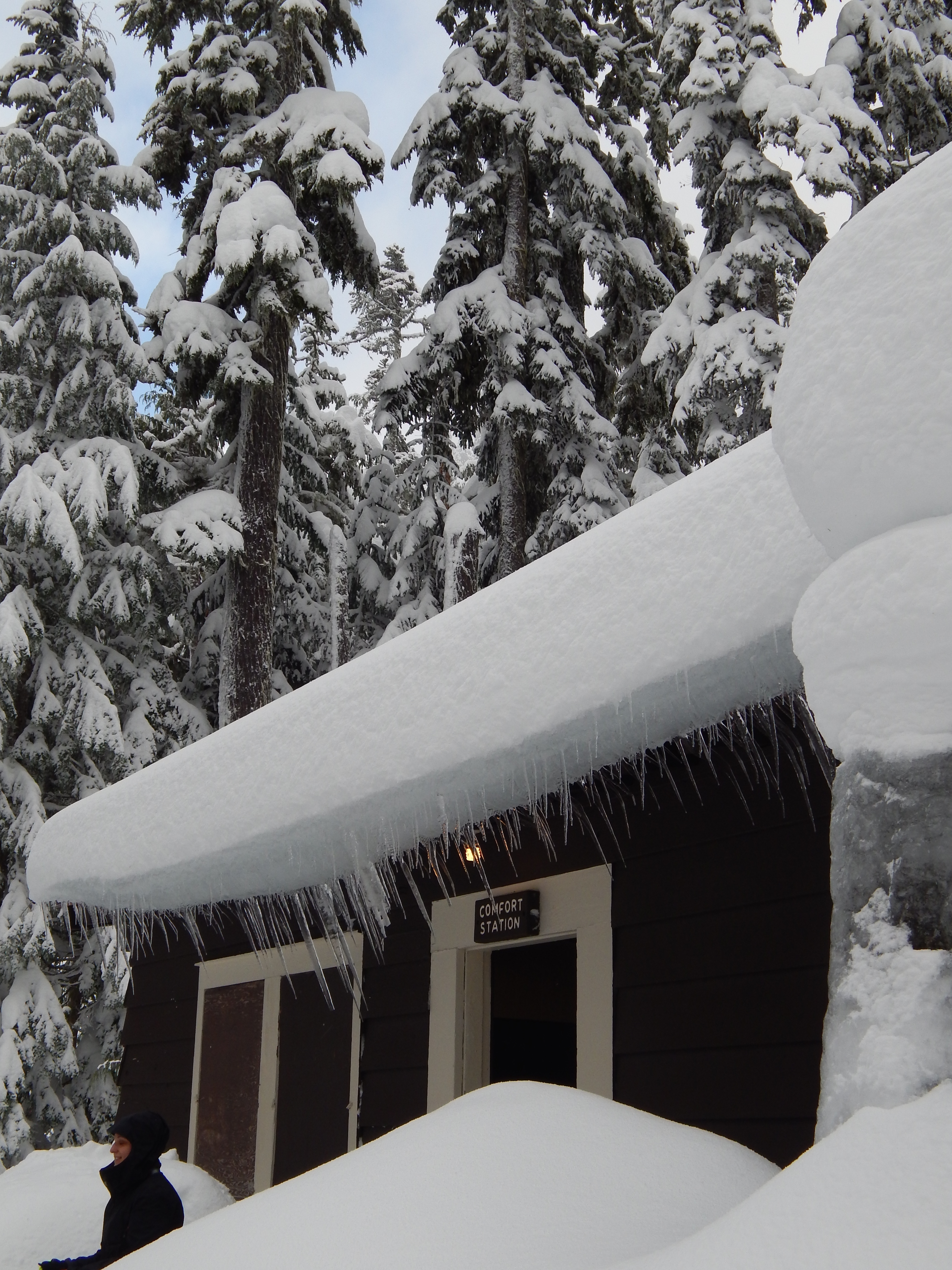
Exterior, 2015

== Significance ==
The Narada Falls Comfort Station was placed on the National Register of Historic Places (NRHP) on March 13, 1991. The building is part of the Mount Rainier National Historic Landmark District that encompasses the entire park; the landmark designation and the comfort station's NRHP nomination recognizes the park's inventory of National Park Service-designed rustic architecture.

The comfort station was also listed with the Washington State Heritage Register on the same date.
