= Narada Falls Bridge =

NRHP-listed bridge in Washington state

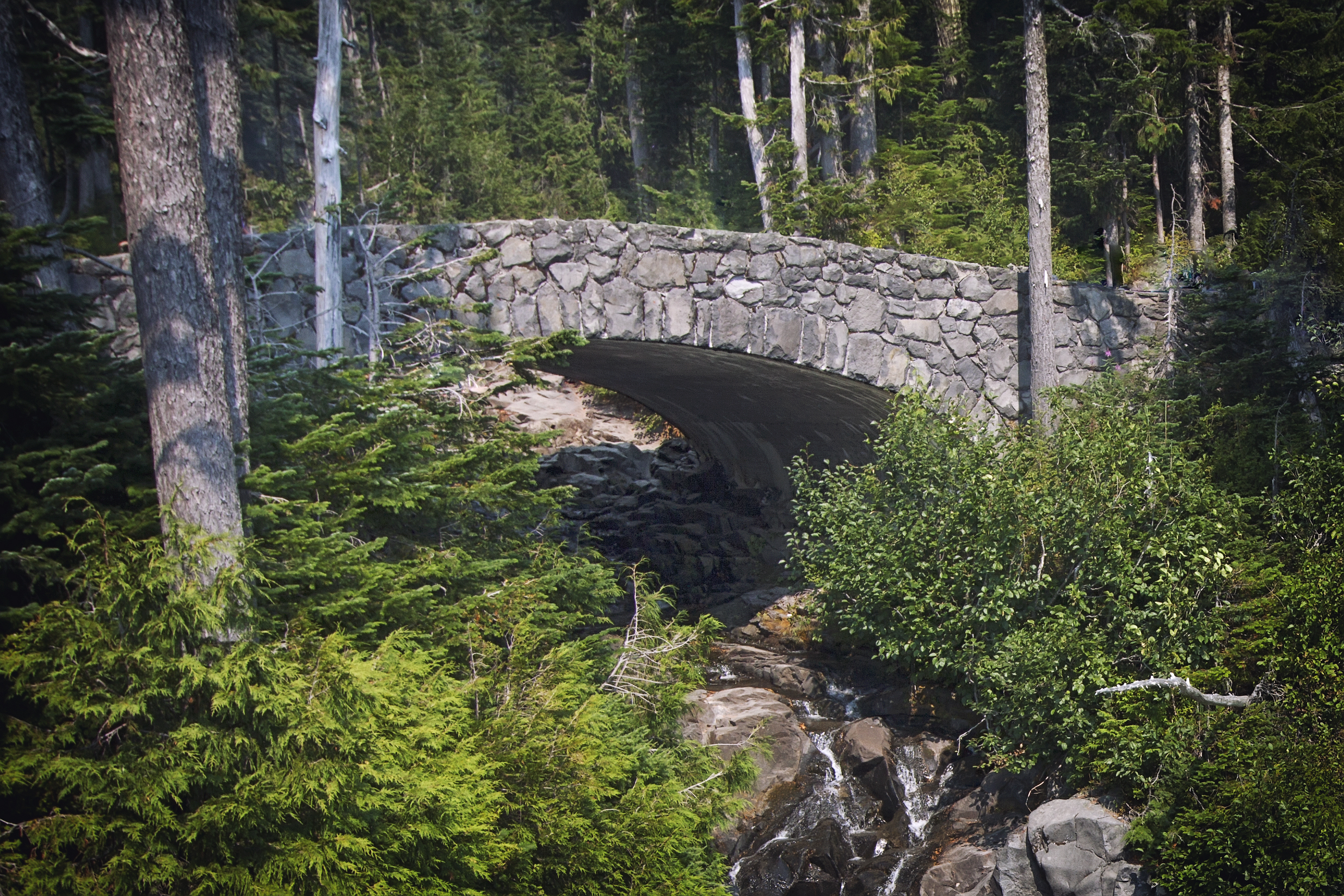
- Narada Falls Bridge, 2015
- Coordinates: 46°46′31″N 121°44′43″W
- Carries: Paradise Road
- Crosses: Narada Falls
- Locale: Paradise, Washington
- Preceded by: Narada Falls Bridge, built 1908, destroyed 1916

Characteristics
- Design: Deck arch
- Total length: 36 feet (11 m)
- Width: 20 feet (6.1 m)

History
- Constructed by: J. D. Tobin
- Construction start: 1927
- Construction end: 1928
- Narada Falls Bridge
- U.S. National Register of Historic Places
- Washington State Heritage Register
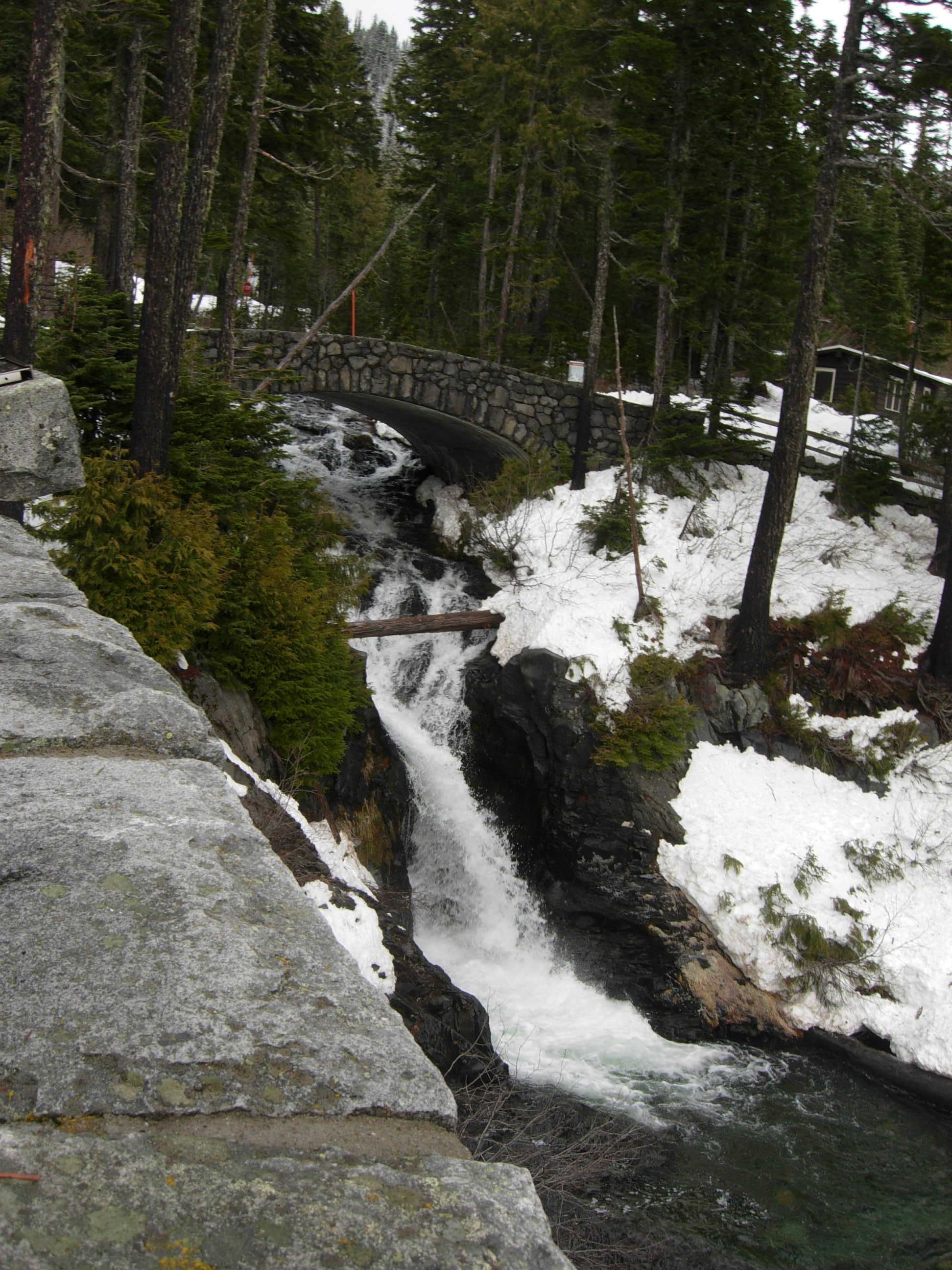
- Alternate view, 2007

- Location within Washington (state)
- Nearest city: Paradise, Washington
- Area: less than one acre
- Architect: E.A. Davidson
- Architectural style: National Park Service rustic
- Website: National Park Service - Historic Narada Falls Area
- MPS: Mt. Rainier National Park MPS
- NRHP reference No.: 91000197 (Note: As of 2025, the Narada Falls Bridge NRHP file has not been digitized. Please review the catalogued inventory form.)
- Added to NRHP: March 13, 1991

Location
- Interactive map of Narada Falls Bridge

The Narada Falls Bridge is an arch bridge in Mount Rainier National Park, spanning Paradise River above Narada Falls. The bridge was placed on the National Register of Historic Places (NRHP) on March 13, 1991. It is part of the Mount Rainier National Historic Landmark District, which both encompasses the entire park and recognizes Mt. Rainier's inventory of National Park Service rustic architecture.

The 36 foot (11 m) long reinforced concrete span was built beginning in 1927, replacing an earlier crossing that was destroyed by 1916. Constructed in conjunction with the NRHP-listed Christine Falls Bridge, it was known as the "First Crossing of the Paradise River". The flat-deck overpass features stone rubble masonry meant to blend in with the surrounding landscape. Pedestrians are able to cross the bridge on foot, accessing a viewpoint of the falls and other trailheads, as well as access to the Narada Falls Comfort Station, an NRHP-listed public restroom.

== History ==
During a trip to Mt. Rainier in 1893, the moniker of Narada Falls was designated by the Narada Branch of the Theosophical Society of Western Washington. Narada comes from the Hindu word meaning "pure" or "uncontaminated". The word is also a Chinook term translated as "peace".

An early road leading to the waterfall was begun in late-August 1904, but plans for a bridge were not determined at the time. The first Narada Falls bridge was constructed in 1908. During the winter of 1915-1916, the original overpass was destroyed due to heavy snowfall and melt. Until a replacement span was built, visitors to the area traversed a 1.5-mile (2.4 km) trail on foot and horseback to access Paradise from Narada Falls.

The existing Narada Falls Bridge was built between 1927 and 1928. The new structure was known as the "First Crossing of the Paradise River". The span was constructed in conjunction with Christine Falls Bridge and was part of an effort in the 1920s to improve Paradise Road which led between Longmire and Paradise.

The contractor was J.D. Tobin out of Portland, Oregon; (Note: Christine Falls Bridge was also constructed by Tobin. See that article for more information.) Tobin was the lowest bidder for the contract and work began in August 1927. Detour bridges were built during the project but despite quick work, including the pouring of concrete by October, difficulties in obtaining quality, local stones for veneer masonry waylaid the project. By November, the efforts were considered to be "98% complete". The Branch of Plans and Designs, Western Division of the National Park Service, suggested the stone masonry. Landscape architect E.A. Davidson supervised the stonework. Road improvements were managed under the Bureau of Public Roads.

== Geography ==
The bridge is part of Nisqaully-Paradise Road located within the Mount Rainier Historic Landmark District. The structure spans over Paradise River and the Narada Falls to a utility area, which is home to another NRHP-listed site, the Narada Falls Comfort Station. Per the NRHP form, the bridge is known as the "first crossing" of the river and described as part of a "utility road". The water feature, at 150 feet (45.7 m) in height, is the tallest such waterfall accessible by automobile in the park. Visitors to the site walk over the bridge to a viewpoint of the waterfall.

== Architecture and features ==
The Narada Falls Bridge is considered by the National Register of Historic Places form to be constructed in National Park Service rustic-style and is of use for pedestrians and vehicles, though closed for public automobiles. The single span structure is 36 feet (11.0 m) in length with a top deck width of 20 feet (6.1 m). The flat, two-lane passage features bordering sidewalks 3.5 feet (1.1 m) wide. The arch bridge was constructed of reinforced concrete and features parapet walls; the face of the bridge is sheathed in stone rubble masonry.

The bridge was built larger than necessary, constructed in a fashion to provide a "sense of bulk and strength" in comparison to the surrounding natural environment. By 1991, the bridge was rated to hold up to 30 tons.

The Narada Falls Bridge, along with Christine Falls Bridge, was one of the first spans in Mt. Rainier National Park to follow the curve of the existing road, to contain guardrails, and have architectural features such as buttresses, spandrels, and an arch. The style, specifically the masonry, was intended to blend in with the natural environment, free of decorative designs or elements. The rocks, as well as the mortar pattern, followed an engineered specificity that was standard in other such bridges being built in the park at the time. The landscape architect was Ernest Davidson; he had "unsatisfactory" stone work removed and redone if the appearance did not follow his guidelines for a "unified naturalistic appearance".

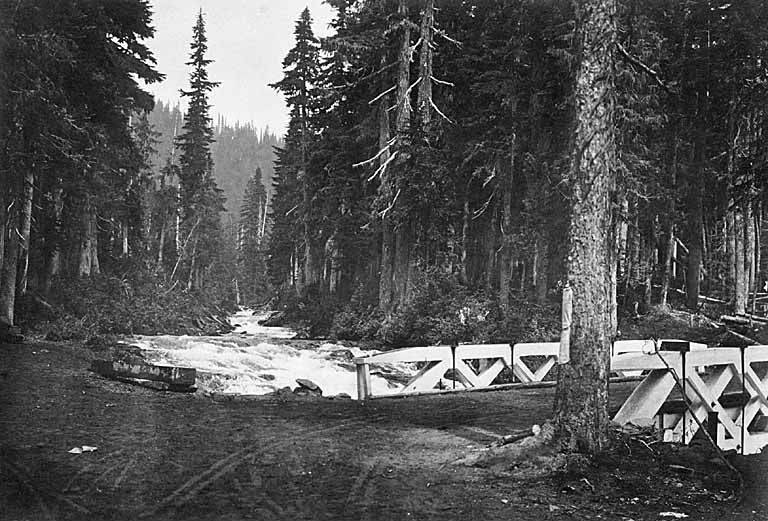
Original bridge, c. 1913

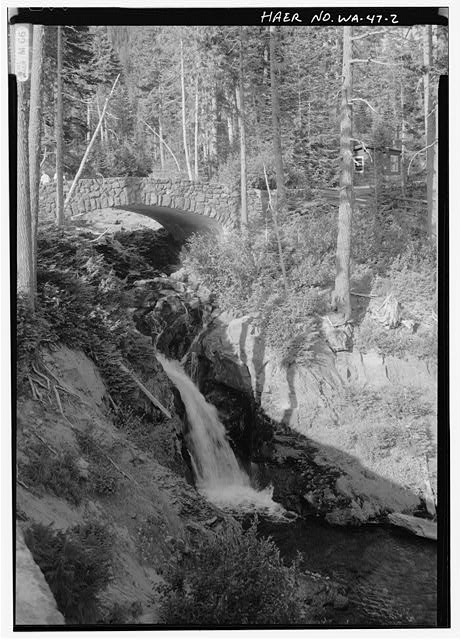
Bridge and falls, 1992

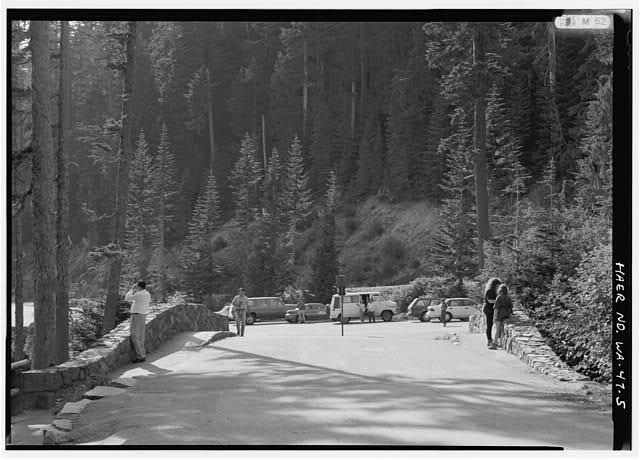
View across deck, 1992

== Recreation ==
A 0.1-mile (0.16 km) trail leads to the waterfall viewpoint; the Wonderland Trail is accessed 0.2-mile (0.32 km) further on the path. Skiers and snowshoe hikers can access slopes at Tatoosh Range, including Reflection Lakes Basin, near the Narada Falls Comfort Station by crossing over the bridge from the nearby parking lot.

== Significance ==
The Narada Falls Bridge was added to the National Register of Historic Places on March 13, 1991. The NRHP nomination noted the arched span to be "an excellent example of the attempt to achieve a rustic appearance" and representative of an overall thematic style of bridges within Mt. Rainier National Park.

The bridge was also listed with the Washington State Heritage Register.

== See also ==
- List of bridges documented by the Historic American Engineering Record in Washington (state)
