= Paradise River =

River at Mount Rainier, Washington state

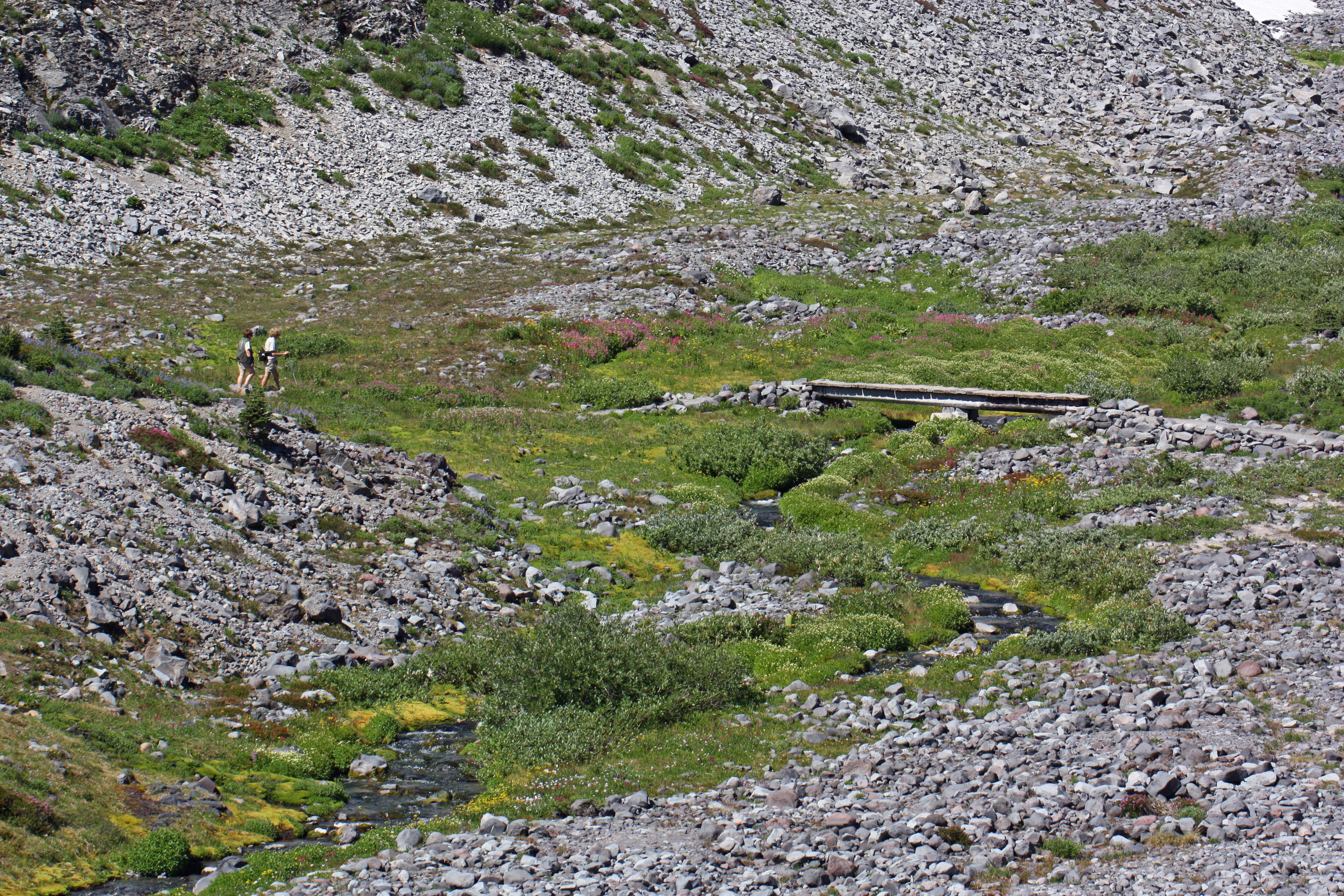
- Paradise River at the Skyline Trail Bridge

Location
- Country: United States
- State: Washington
- Counties: Pierce County, Lewis County

Physical characteristics
- Source: Paradise Glacier
  - location: Mount Rainier
- Mouth: Nisqually River
  - coordinates: 46°45′52″N 121°47′24″W

Basin features
- Geographic Names Information System: 1533608

The Paradise River is a small, short but swift river in Pierce County, Washington. It is the first major tributary of the Nisqually River. Located entirely within the bounds of Mount Rainier National Park, it is notable for its waterfalls, of which there are eight.

== Course ==
The Paradise River originates at the toe of the Paradise Glacier. It drops over Paradise Falls and Sluiskin Falls as it drops swiftly downhill into Paradise Valley. Just before entering the valley it receives Edith Creek, which also has many waterfalls along its course. From there, the river flows generally southwest. After flowing out of Paradise Valley, the river drops over Ruby Falls and the Washington Cascades. Not long after that, the river widens out and drops over probably the most famous and well known waterfall in the Mount Rainier area, Narada Falls, and soon after is crossed by the Mount Rainier Highway. Narada Falls is soon followed by the seldom-seen Sidewinder Cascades. A ways past Narada Falls, the river drops over Madcap Falls before it is joined soon after by Tatoosh Creek, which also has more than one major waterfall along its course. After that the river turns west, drops over Carter Falls soon after, and makes its final push toward its confluence with the Nisqually River.

== See also ==
- List of geographic features in Lewis County, Washington
- List of rivers in Washington
- Narada Falls Bridge
- Narada Falls Comfort Station
- Paradise River Waterfalls
