= Paradise, Washington =

Unincorporated community in Washington, United States

Paradise
- Unincorporated community
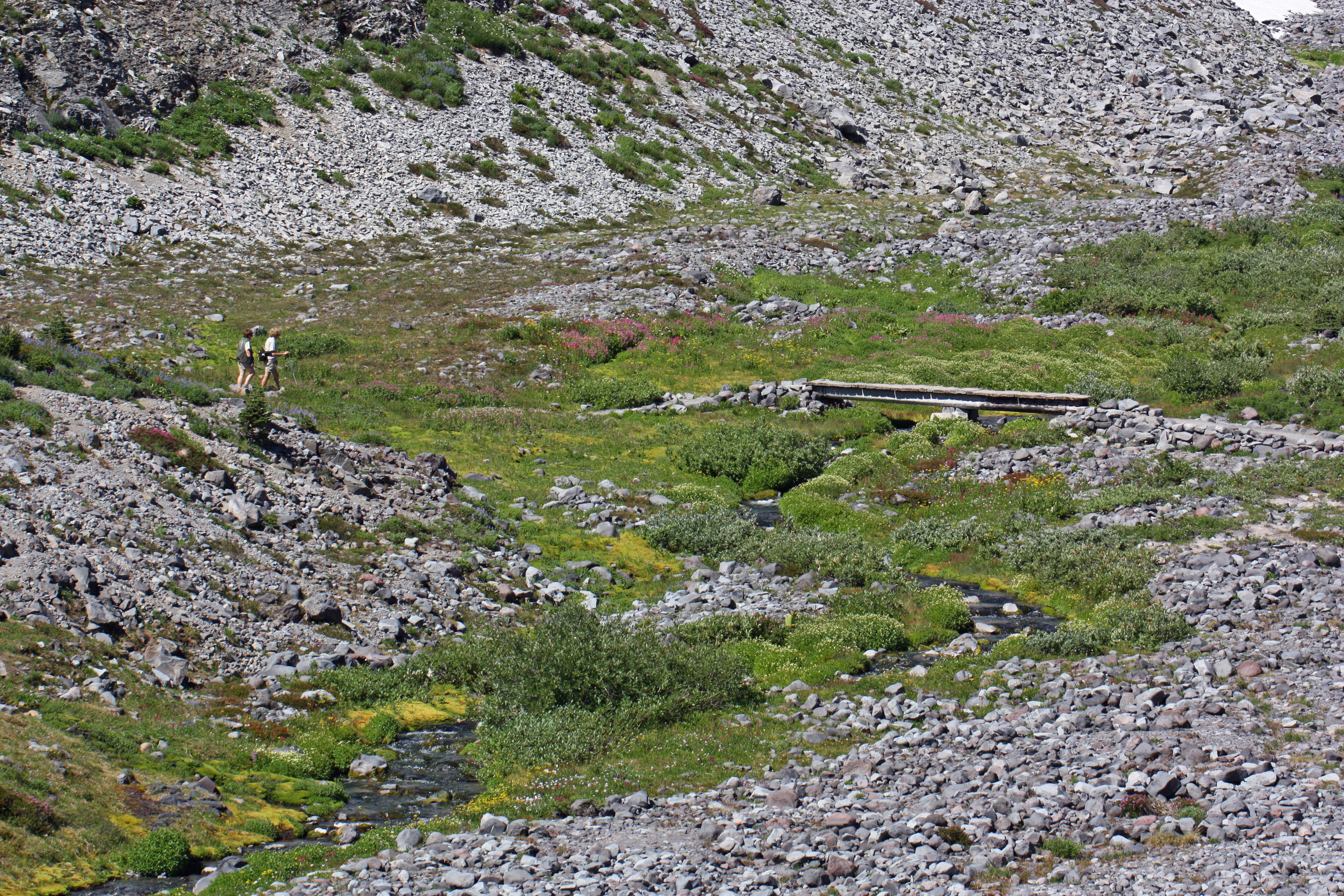
- Hikers and wildflowers along the Paradise River near its source

- Location in the United States Location in Washington
- Coordinates: 46°47′9.03″N 121°44′15.43″W
- Country: United States
- State: Washington
- County: Pierce
- Elevation: 5,400 ft (1,600 m)
- Time zone: UTC-8 (Pacific (PST))
  - Summer (DST): UTC-7 (PDT)

Paradise is the name of an area at approximately 5,400 feet (1,600 m) on the south slope of Mount Rainier in Mount Rainier National Park in Washington, United States. Southeast of Seattle, the area lies on the border of Pierce and Lewis counties and includes the Paradise Valley and the Paradise Glacier, the source of the Paradise River. Paradise also offers views of Mount Rainier and the Tatoosh Range.

== History ==
Virinda Longmire named Paradise in the summer of 1885 while she viewed the wildflowers in the alpine meadows there.

In the late 1800s, as more visitors began arriving at Longmire Springs, most were not content with the view of Mt. Rainier from the resort. To accommodate the demands of his growing customer base, James Longmire's son, Elcaine, constructed a rough path from the resort to Paradise Park around 1885. In 1892 (or possibly 1895), Elcaine's son, Leonard, along with a resort employee by the name of Henry Carter, constructed a foot and bridle path that followed the Paradise River up to Paradise Park. During the ensuing years the Longmire's charged tourists 50 cents to use the new and improved route.

== Arts and culture ==
=== Historic buildings and sites ===
Paradise is the location of the historic Paradise Inn (built 1916), Paradise Guide House (built 1920) and Henry M. Jackson Visitor Center (built 1966; replaced 2008; original building demolished 2009). The inn is listed in the National Register of Historic Places. The historic center of Paradise was designated the Paradise Historic District.

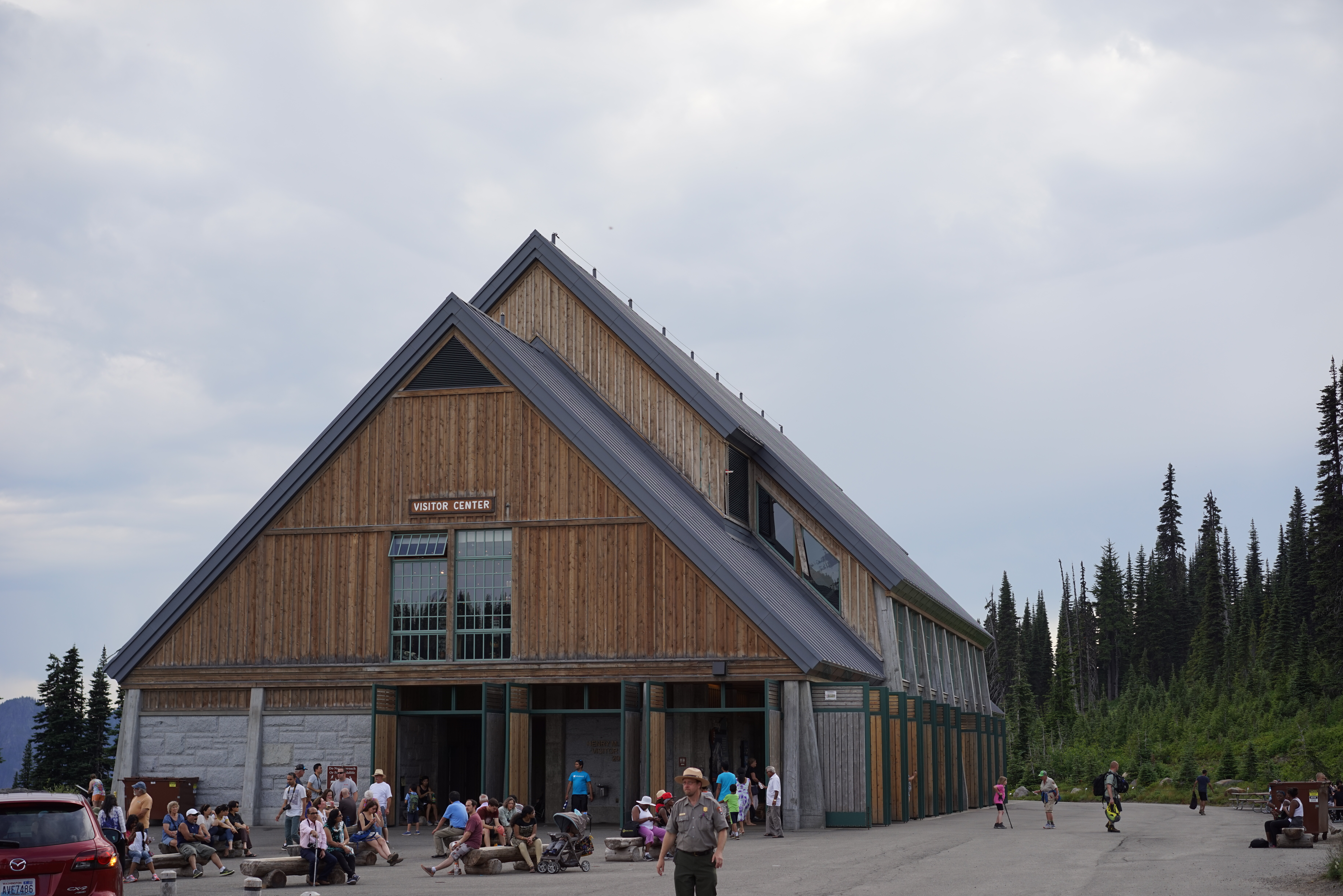
Henry M. Jackson Visitor Center

A golf course was built in the area in 1931; five years later, a rope tow for alpine skiing was installed. These were both added as facilities for use by the guests of the inn. From 1942 to 1943, the U.S. Army used the inn to house troops (87th Mountain Infantry) training for winter mountain conditions.

The National Park Service undertook a two-year, $30 million project to perform renovations and structural work to allow the inn withstand a large earthquake and to replace the "flying saucer-shaped" Henry M. Jackson Visitor Center with a new building of the same name complementing the historic lodge. The inn re-opened in 2008, along with the new visitor center. The old visitor center was demolished in 2009.

=== Tourism ===
Paradise is the most popular destination for visitors to Mount Rainier National Park. 62% of the over 1.3 million people who visited the park in 2000 went to Paradise. The road from the Nisqually entrance of the National Park to Paradise (State Route 706) is one of the few roads in the park open to automobiles in the winter. The first road to Paradise was completed in 1911.

Panorama of Paradise from Skyline Trail, 2015

== Climate ==
Climate chart for Paradise

The National Park Service says that "Paradise is one of the snowiest places on Earth where snowfall is measured regularly." (1,122 inches; 93.5 ft; 28.5 m) of snow fell during the winter of 1971–1972, setting a world record at the time. The minimum annual snowfall at Paradise was 266 inches in the winter of 2014–15, and the maximum snowpack was (367 inches; 30.6 ft; 9.3 m) on March 9–10, 1956. No snowfall measurements were made from 1943 to 1946 as the road to Paradise was closed during World War II. The high snowfall is in spite of no month recording average highs below freezing. Under the Köppen climate classification Paradise has a subpolar oceanic climate that may also be described as subarctic or subalpine.

Climate data for Paradise Ranger Station, 1991–2020 normals, extremes 1916–present
Month	Jan	Feb	Mar	Apr	May	Jun	Jul	Aug	Sep	Oct	Nov	Dec	Year
Record high °F (°C)	65 (18)	63 (17)	70 (21)	78 (26)	83 (28)	90 (32)	92 (33)	92 (33)	89 (32)	88 (31)	78 (26)	63 (17)	92 (33)
Mean maximum °F (°C)	48.9 (9.4)	49.9 (9.9)	52.2 (11.2)	59.5 (15.3)	68.4 (20.2)	72.1 (22.3)	78.6 (25.9)	78.9 (26.1)	75.6 (24.2)	65.6 (18.7)	54.4 (12.4)	48.0 (8.9)	81.4 (27.4)
Mean daily maximum °F (°C)	34.5 (1.4)	34.1 (1.2)	35.7 (2.1)	40.0 (4.4)	48.2 (9.0)	53.6 (12.0)	62.2 (16.8)	63.6 (17.6)	57.4 (14.1)	46.4 (8.0)	37.0 (2.8)	32.6 (0.3)	45.4 (7.4)
Daily mean °F (°C)	29.2 (−1.6)	28.3 (−2.1)	29.7 (−1.3)	33.2 (0.7)	40.6 (4.8)	45.2 (7.3)	53.1 (11.7)	54.4 (12.4)	49.3 (9.6)	39.6 (4.2)	31.5 (−0.3)	27.3 (−2.6)	38.5 (3.6)
Mean daily minimum °F (°C)	23.8 (−4.6)	22.6 (−5.2)	23.6 (−4.7)	26.4 (−3.1)	33.0 (0.6)	36.8 (2.7)	43.9 (6.6)	45.2 (7.3)	41.2 (5.1)	32.8 (0.4)	26.0 (−3.3)	22.0 (−5.6)	31.4 (−0.3)
Mean minimum °F (°C)	11.8 (−11.2)	9.6 (−12.4)	12.3 (−10.9)	16.0 (−8.9)	21.2 (−6.0)	26.3 (−3.2)	32.1 (0.1)	33.3 (0.7)	29.9 (−1.2)	19.6 (−6.9)	13.6 (−10.2)	9.4 (−12.6)	3.4 (−15.9)
Record low °F (°C)	−13 (−25)	−18 (−28)	−2 (−19)	2 (−17)	10 (−12)	13 (−11)	15 (−9)	22 (−6)	18 (−8)	2 (−17)	−11 (−24)	−20 (−29)	−20 (−29)
Average precipitation inches (mm)	17.22 (437)	12.93 (328)	13.21 (336)	8.35 (212)	5.08 (129)	3.84 (98)	1.41 (36)	1.64 (42)	4.43 (113)	11.25 (286)	18.16 (461)	18.92 (481)	116.44 (2,958)
Average snowfall inches (cm)	118.7 (301)	91.6 (233)	90.6 (230)	67.5 (171)	26.1 (66)	5.6 (14)	0.3 (0.76)	0.0 (0.0)	1.4 (3.6)	24.1 (61)	120.9 (307)	124.0 (315)	670.8 (1,704)
Average extreme snow depth inches (cm)	135.2 (343)	159.7 (406)	184.9 (470)	187.4 (476)	164.6 (418)	113.2 (288)	44.8 (114)	5.2 (13)	0.8 (2.0)	12.0 (30)	48.4 (123)	99.0 (251)	195.2 (496)
Average precipitation days (≥ 0.01 in)	21.1	17.8	21.5	18.8	15.4	12.8	7.3	6.6	9.6	15.0	21.7	21.1	188.7
Average snowy days (≥ 0.1 in)	18.5	15.9	19.5	14.4	7.9	2.5	0.2	0.0	0.7	6.2	16.6	19.0	121.4
Source 1: National Weather Service
Source 2: NOAA (average snowfall/snowy days and precip days 1981–2010)

== Bibliography ==
- Wilfred Schmoe, Floyd (July 1999) [1959]. A Year in Paradise: A Personal Experience of Living on Mount Rainier in the Early 1900s (2nd ed.). Mountaineers Books. ISBN 0-89886-653-7.
