= Narada Falls =

Waterfall in Washington (state), United States

Coordinates: 46°46′30″N 121°44′46″W

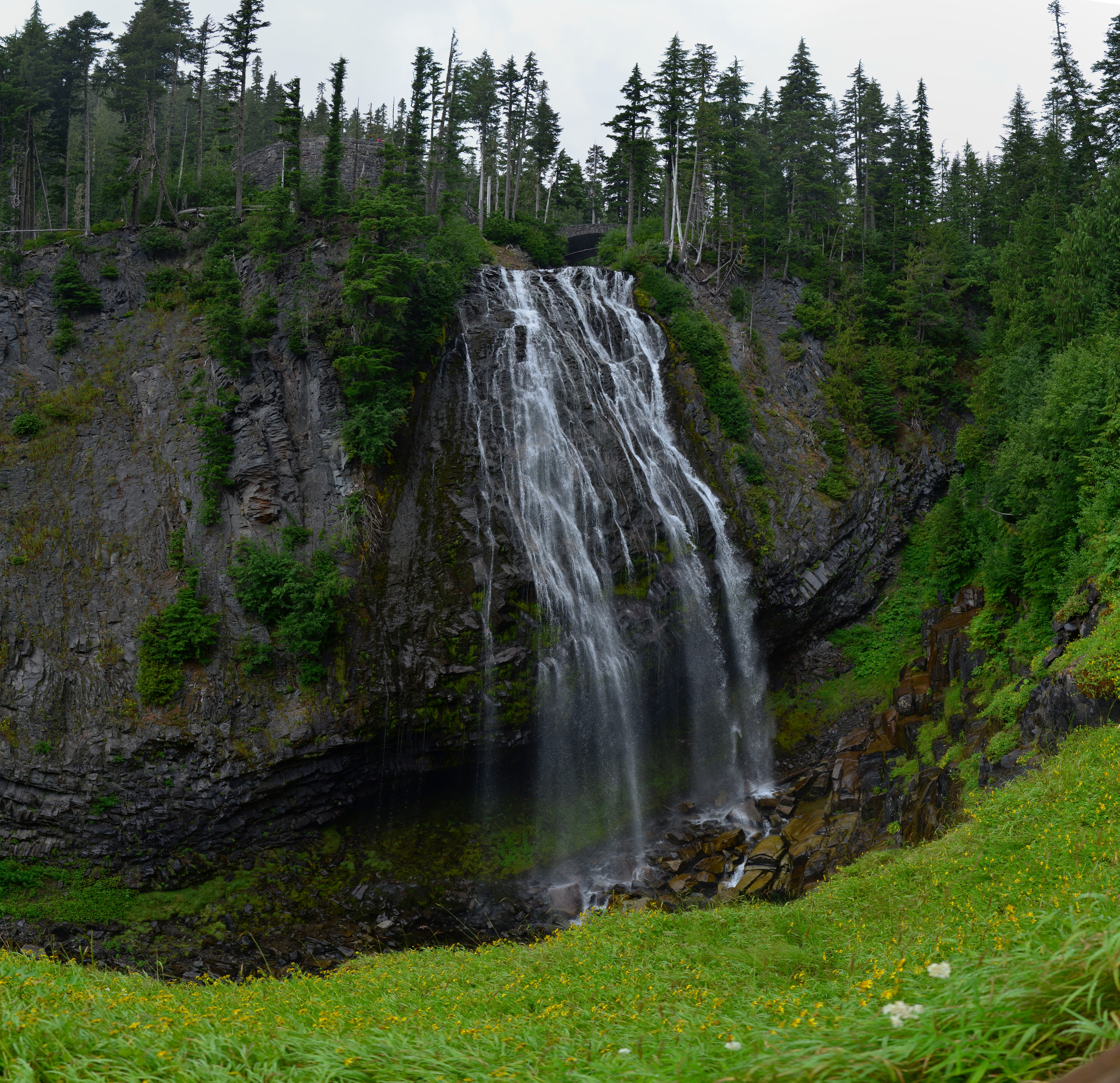
- Narada Falls
- Interactive map of Narada Falls
- Location: Mount Rainier National Park, Lewis County, Washington, United States
- Type: Horsetail
- Total height: 188 feet (57 m)
- Number of drops: 2
- Total width: 50 feet (15 m)
- Watercourse: Paradise River

Narada Falls is a waterfall in Mount Rainier National Park, in the U.S. state of Washington. It is said to be the most popular, because the Mount Rainier Highway crosses the falls between its two tiers.

The waterfall drops 188 feet (57 m) in two tiers of 168 feet (51 m) and 20 feet (6.1 m). The upper tier is a horsetail that falls in several strands down a nearly sheer cliff, into a canyon that is perpendicular to it. The lower tier is a much smaller plunge. During the winter, the upper falls freezes and becomes a sheer 150 feet (46 m) of icicles, which attracts many ice climbers.

== History ==
The waterfall was originally called Cushman Falls, but the name was not widespread. The falls were named Narada by Arthur F. Knight during a week-long trip to Mount Rainier in 1893 for the Narada branch of the Theosophical Society of Western Washington, with Narada of a Hindu guru. Narada is also a Hindu word meaning and "pure" or "uncontaminated". A variant on the spelling is Neradah and a common mistake is "Nevada Falls".

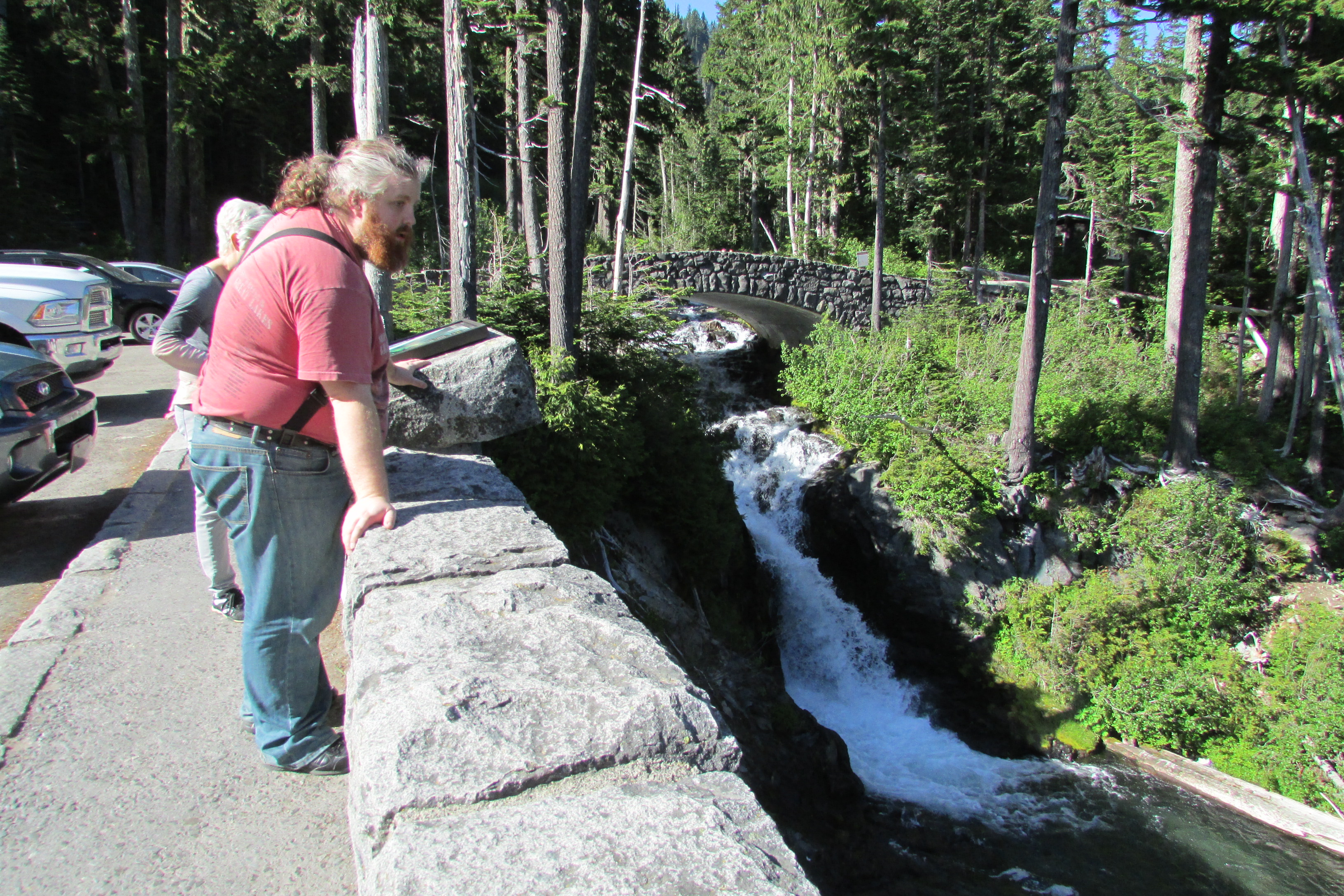
Narada Falls from the overlook

== See also ==
Media related to Narada Falls at Wikimedia Commons

- List of geographic features in Lewis County, Washington
- Narada Falls Bridge
