= Henry M. Jackson Visitor Center =

Coordinates: 46°47.060′N 121°44.442′W

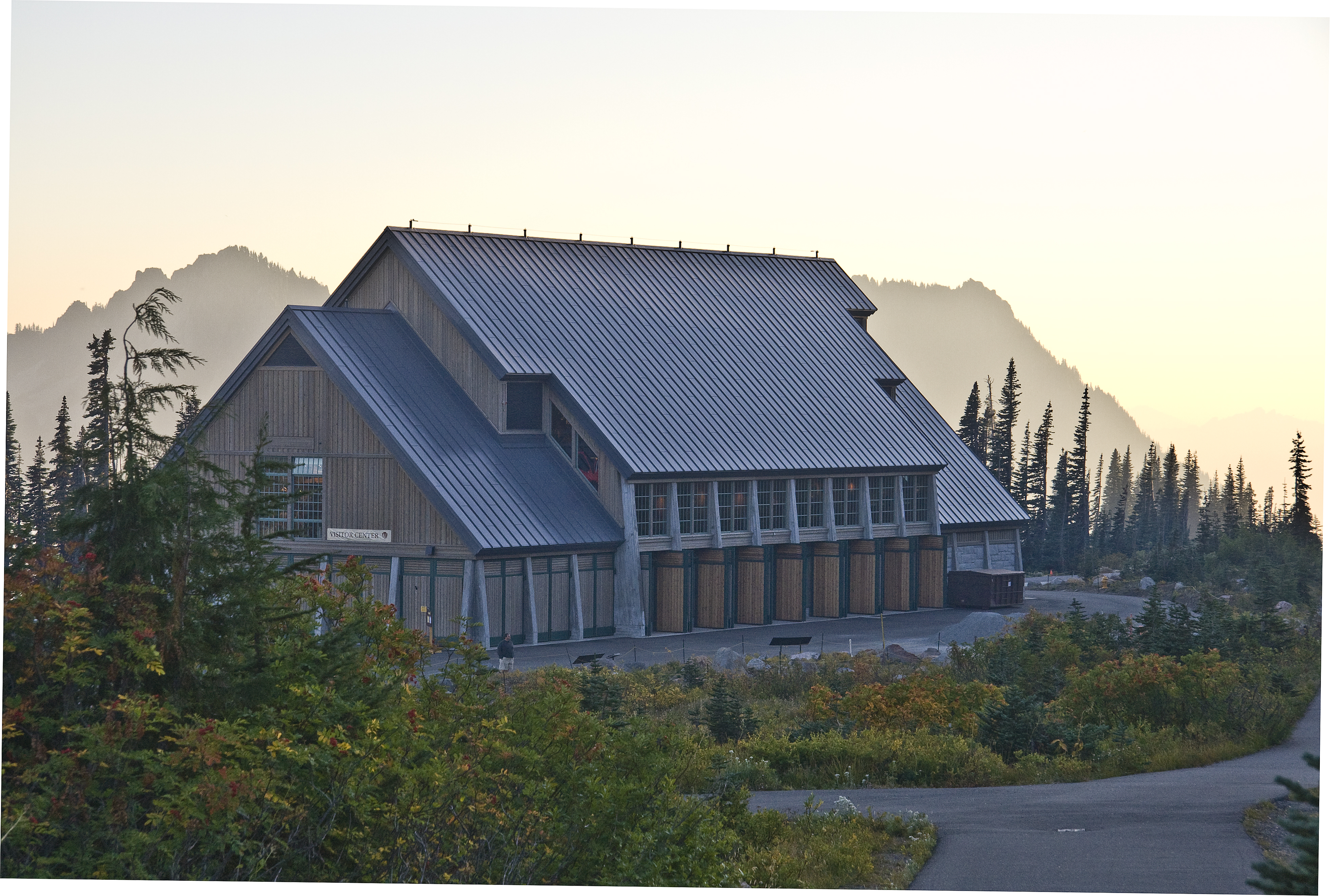
New Jackson Visitor Center with the Tatoosh Range in the background.

The Henry M. Jackson Visitor Center is a day-use facility located in the Paradise area of Mount Rainier National Park. The facility offers exhibits, films, guided ranger programs, a book store, a snack bar, a gift shop, and public restrooms, as well as informational brochures and maps.

The first Jackson Visitor Center opened in 1966 as part of the National Park Service's Mission 66 program. Originally known as the Paradise Visitor Center, it was renamed in 1987 after the death of Senator Henry M. Jackson, who had been instrumental in the development of the program at Mt. Rainier. Construction of a new Jackson Visitor Center was completed in 2008, and the original building was demolished in November 2008.

== History ==
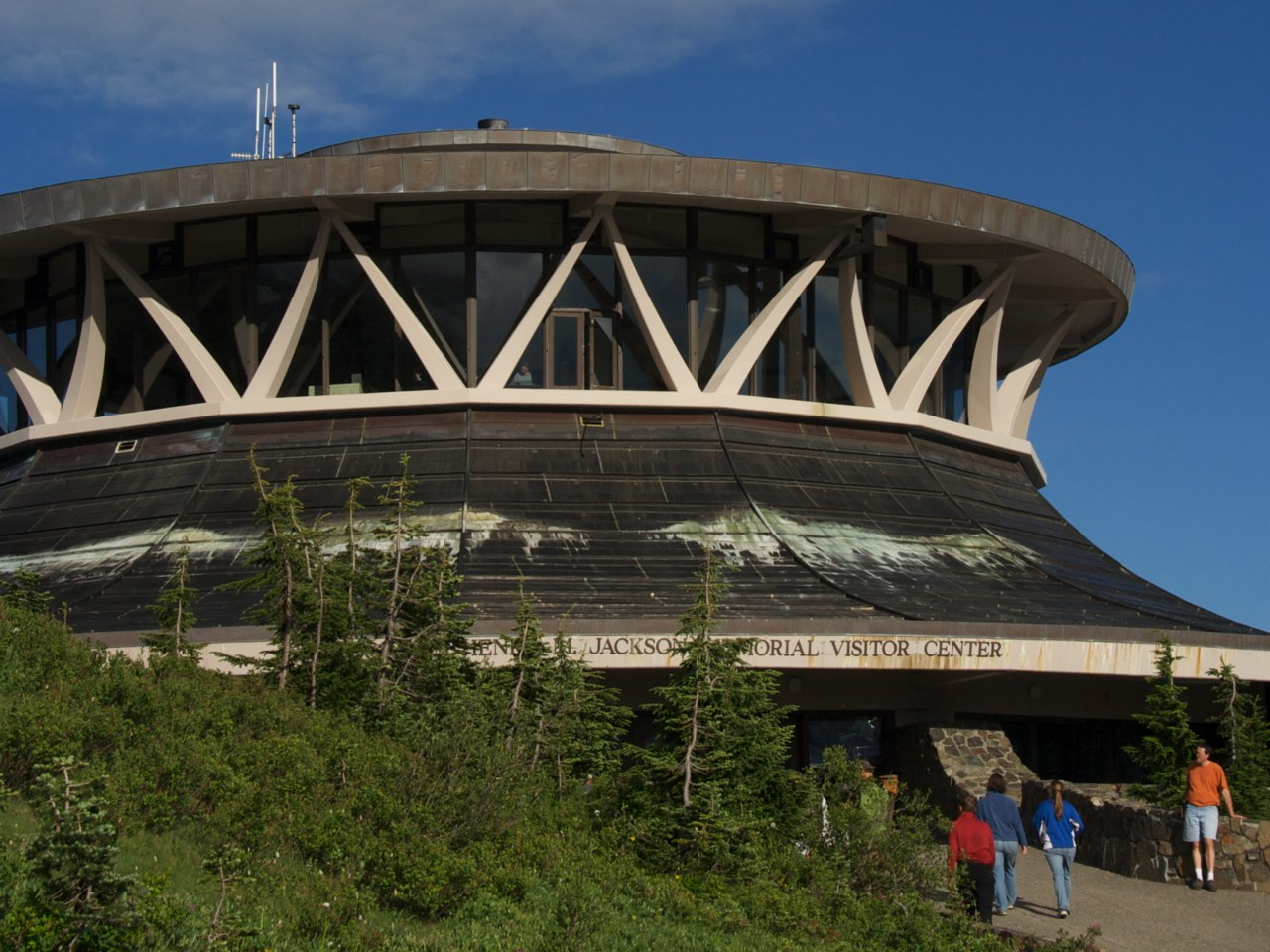
Jackson Visitor Center, 1966–2008.

Mount Rainier was a pilot park in the Mission 66 program to expand National Park visitor services. The plans for the Paradise Visitor Center as a day-use facility came about as a compromise when the program was still trying to determine whether overnight lodging would be feasible. Construction began in 1964, and facilities were to include a restaurant, museum, information center, ski rental shop, and a warming hut. By the time construction was completed in 1966, costs had grown to US$2 million.

== Architecture ==
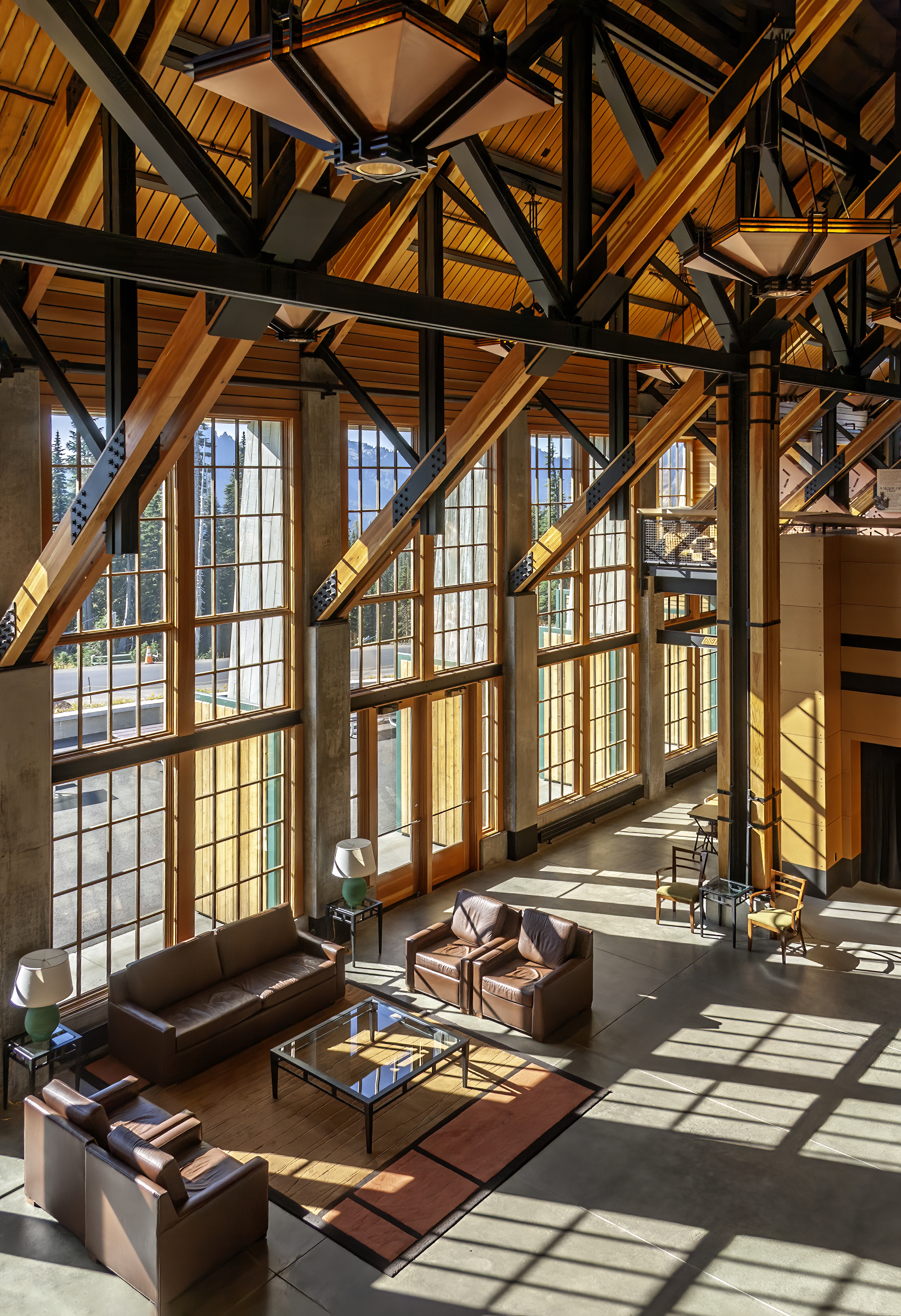
Interior of the new Henry M. Jackson Visitor Center

The original building was designed by Whimberley, Whisenand, Allison & Tong of Honolulu, with McGuire & Muri of Tacoma, Washington. The structure's round shape and distinctive roof were intended to fit its surrounding mountain landscape. A flyer produced for the opening ceremony spoke of "the swooping, bough-like shape of the beams, the branching 'tree' columns, the 'switchback trail' ramps, and the sloped 'cliffs' of the stone base".

The architecture, which was consistent with the modernist style common to many of the Mission 66 projects, although a distinct departure from National Park Service Rustic, was always controversial. Drawing frequent comparisons to a flying saucer, it reminded others of a sunken Seattle Space Needle. It was accused of not fulfilling its goal of appropriateness for its setting, instead being "incompatible with the rustic character of Paradise". Others disagreed with this assertion, claiming that "although it doesn't match the rustic styling of Paradise's other buildings, its grandness seems to fit the location".

== Replacement ==
Beyond the varied response to the building's appearance, other more significant architectural problems led the National Park Service to replace the Jackson Visitor Center with a more traditional design. The roof of the original structure was not designed to handle the copious amounts of snowfall in the Paradise area each winter, requiring the consumption of 300 to 500 US gallons (1,100 to 1,900 L; 250 to 420 imp gal) of diesel fuel per day during the snow season to melt snow and prevent the roof from collapsing. Additionally, the building no longer met building and accessibility codes, despite ramps and other features that required a disproportionate amount of space.

The National Park Service began construction of a smaller, more energy-efficient visitor center in 2006. The new Henry M. Jackson visitor center opened on October 10, 2008. Demolition of the original Jackson Visitor Center was accomplished in the spring of 2009.
