= Wilkeson =

Wilkeson can refer to:

- Frank Wilkeson, American journalist and explorer
  - Wilkeson, Washington a town in the US named for his father
- Leon Wilkeson, the bass guitarist of the band Lynyrd Skynyrd
