= Samuel Wilkeson Jr. =

American journalist (1817–1889)

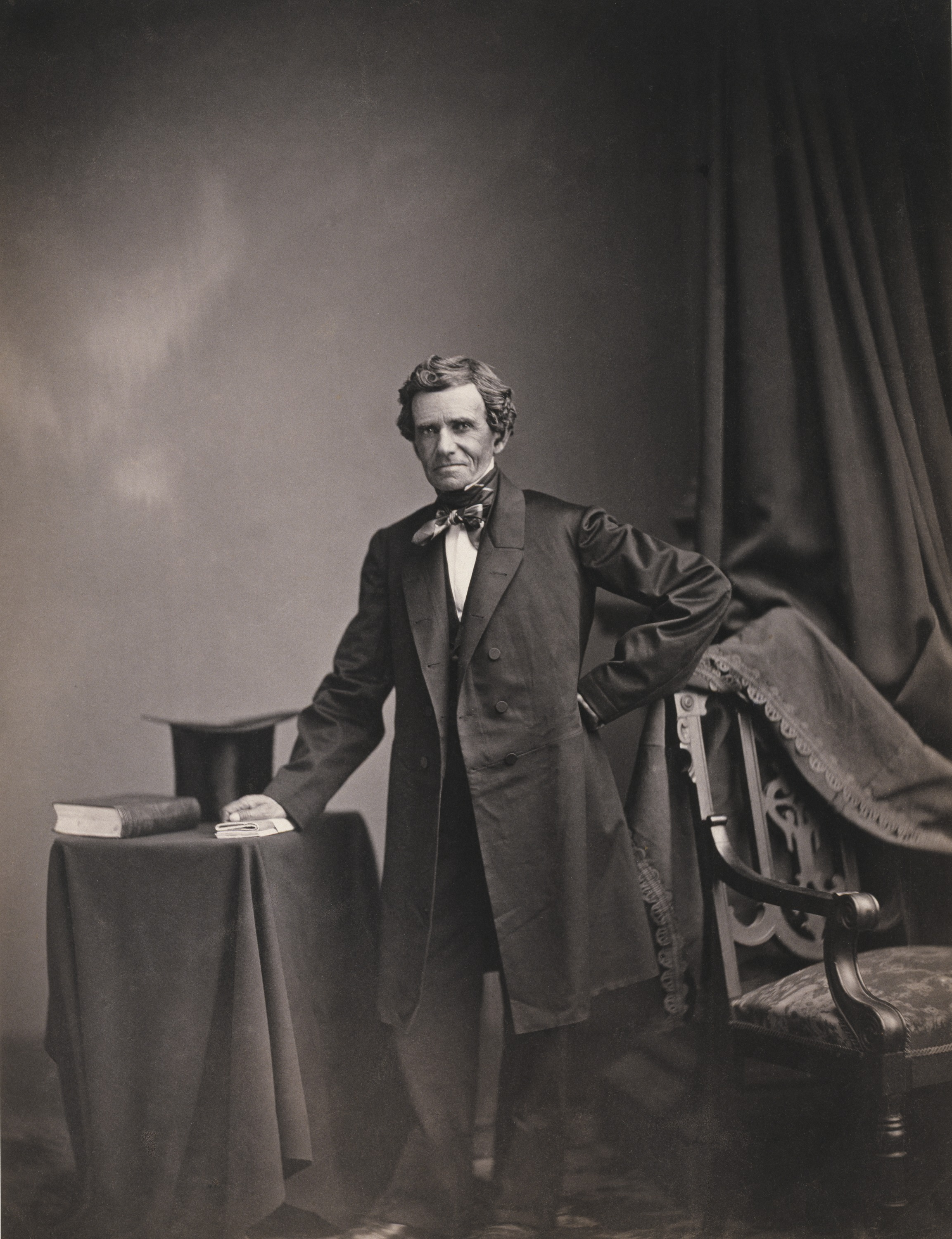
Mr. Wilkeson, by Alexander Gardner, c. 1859; Samuel Wilkeson Jr. was the youngest son of Samuel Wilkeson and a brother-in-law of Elizabeth Cady Stanton

Samuel Wilkeson Jr. (May 9, 1817 – December 2, 1889) was a 19th-century journalist and newspaper editor, and in later life, railroad executive and real-estate developer. While serving as the New York Times' Washington correspondent and reporting on the Battle of Gettysburg during the American Civil War, he found his own son, Lt. Bayard Wilkeson, dead on the battlefield. Wilkeson had previously reclaimed the dead body of John Wilkes Wilkeson, his brother's son, from the field at the Battle of Seven Pines.

My pen is heavy. Oh, you dead, who at Gettysburg have baptized with your blood the second birth of Freedom in America, how you are to be envied! I rise from a grave whose wet clay I have passionately kissed, and I look up and see Christ spanning this battlefield with his feet and reaching fraternally and lovingly up to heaven. His right hand opens the gates of Paradise—with his left he beckons to these mutilated, bloody, swollen forms to ascend.

— Samuel Wilkeson Jr., New York Times, July 4, 1863

== Biography ==
Samuel Wilkeson Jr. was the son of a founding father of Buffalo, New York, Sam Wilkeson Sr. He went to college first at Williams in Massachusetts and then graduated from Union College in Schenectady. After getting started as a freelance writer, Samuel Wilkeson Jr. had been the proprietor and co-editor of The Democracy in Buffalo, a pro-Whig, anti-Know-Nothing newspaper. From approximately 1857 until 1861 worked for New York Tribune under Horace Greeley. One account claims he left the Tribune for the Times "from his indignation at Horace Greeley's act in bailing Jeff Davis," but this is an erroneous or perhaps politically motivated retcon because Greeley contributed to the $100,000 bail for the release of Jefferson Davis in May 1867, two years after the end of the civil war.

Samuel was a war correspondent with the Army of the Potomac during the American Civil War, and was within Gen. George Meade's headquarters during the great artillery attack on it during the Battle of Gettysburg.

Bayard Wilkeson, a 19-year-old officer, was mortally injured leading his unit, 4th U.S. Artillery, Battery G, on July 1, the first day of the battle at Gettysburg, Pennsylvania. He amputated his own leg with a penknife, but later died in a makeshift field hospital that was abandoned by the time his father and uncle found his body on July 3. Samuel Wilkeson filed a story that appeared on page one of the New York Times on the 87th anniversary of American Independence Day; his lede and his mournful conclusion centered on his own son's death but the greater part of the multi-column, multi-page dispatch was a comprehensive and widely admired account of the third and final day of the decisive and brutal battle.

Historian Matthew Pinsker believes President Abraham Lincoln's Gettysburg Address described "a new birth of freedom" based on Wilkeson writing that soldiers had "baptized with your blood the second birth of Freedom in America." Lincoln was known to follow Wilkeson's reporting.

Sam Wilkeson Jr. later owned Albany Evening Journal, which he bought from Thurlow Reed in 1865. He also worked for Jay Cooke and the Northern Pacific Railroad. Beginning in 1868 he went along as a "historian" on the extension of the Northern Pacific route, eventually publishing a pamphlet entitled Wilkeson's Notes on Puget Sound, and then was an executive with the railroad 1870 until his death. He is considered one of the founders of Tacoma, Washington. The coke and coal-mining settlement of Wilkeson, Washington was named after him on his 60th birthday.

== Descendants ==
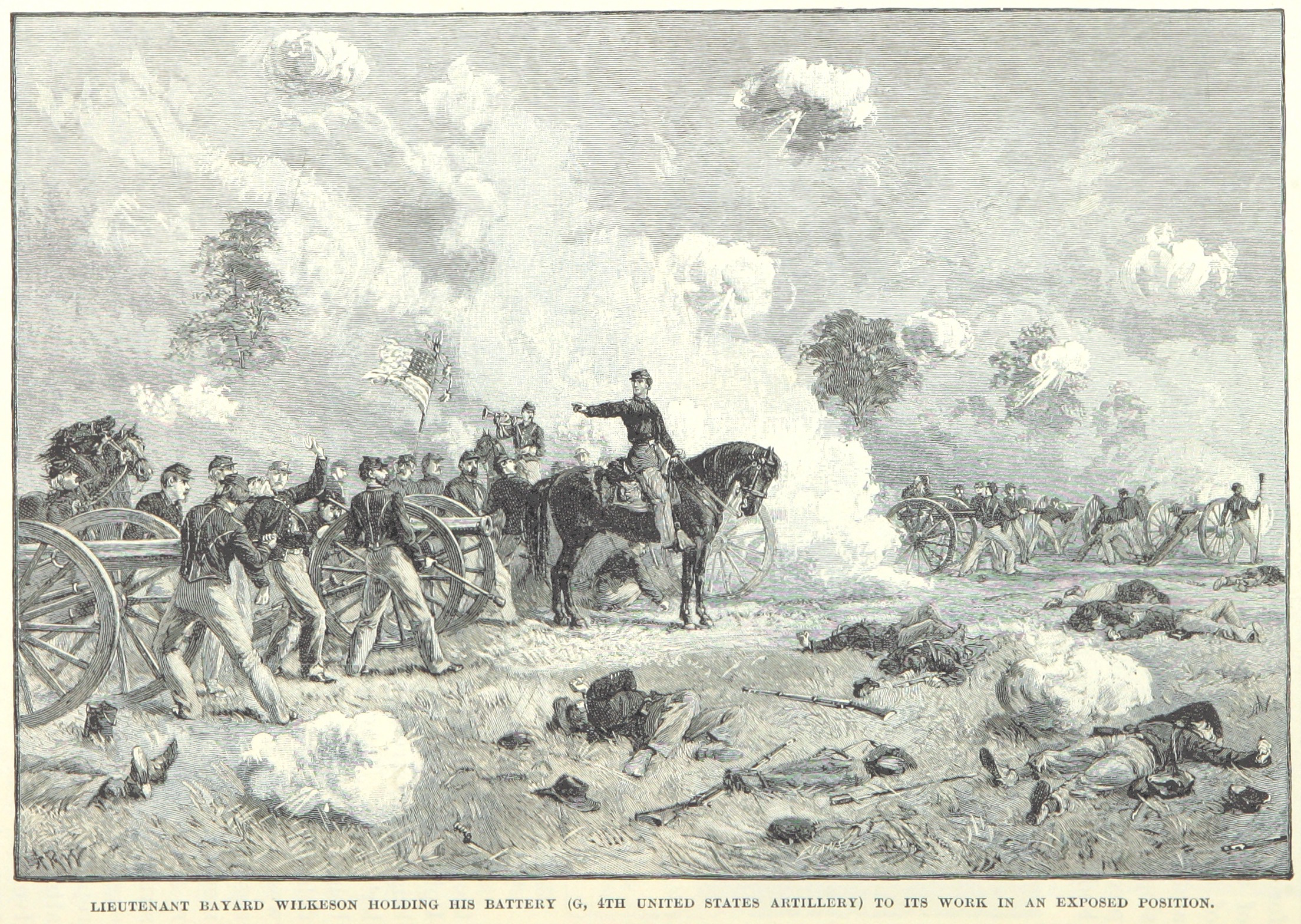
Lt. Wilkeson commanding Battery G at Gettysburg

Wilkeson and his wife Catherine Henry Cady, sister of suffragist Elizabeth Cady Stanton, raised their children on a farm in Columbia County in upstate New York.

- Margaret Livingston Wilkeson (1842–1908) m. Elwood Corson
- Bayard Wilkeson (1844–1863)
- Samuel Gansevoort Wilkeson (1846–1914)
- Frank Wilkeson (1848–1913)
- Mary Wilkeson (1850–1857)

== See also ==
- List of war correspondents of the American Civil War
