= Holy Trinity Orthodox Church =

Historic church in Washington, United States

- U.S. National Register of Historic Places
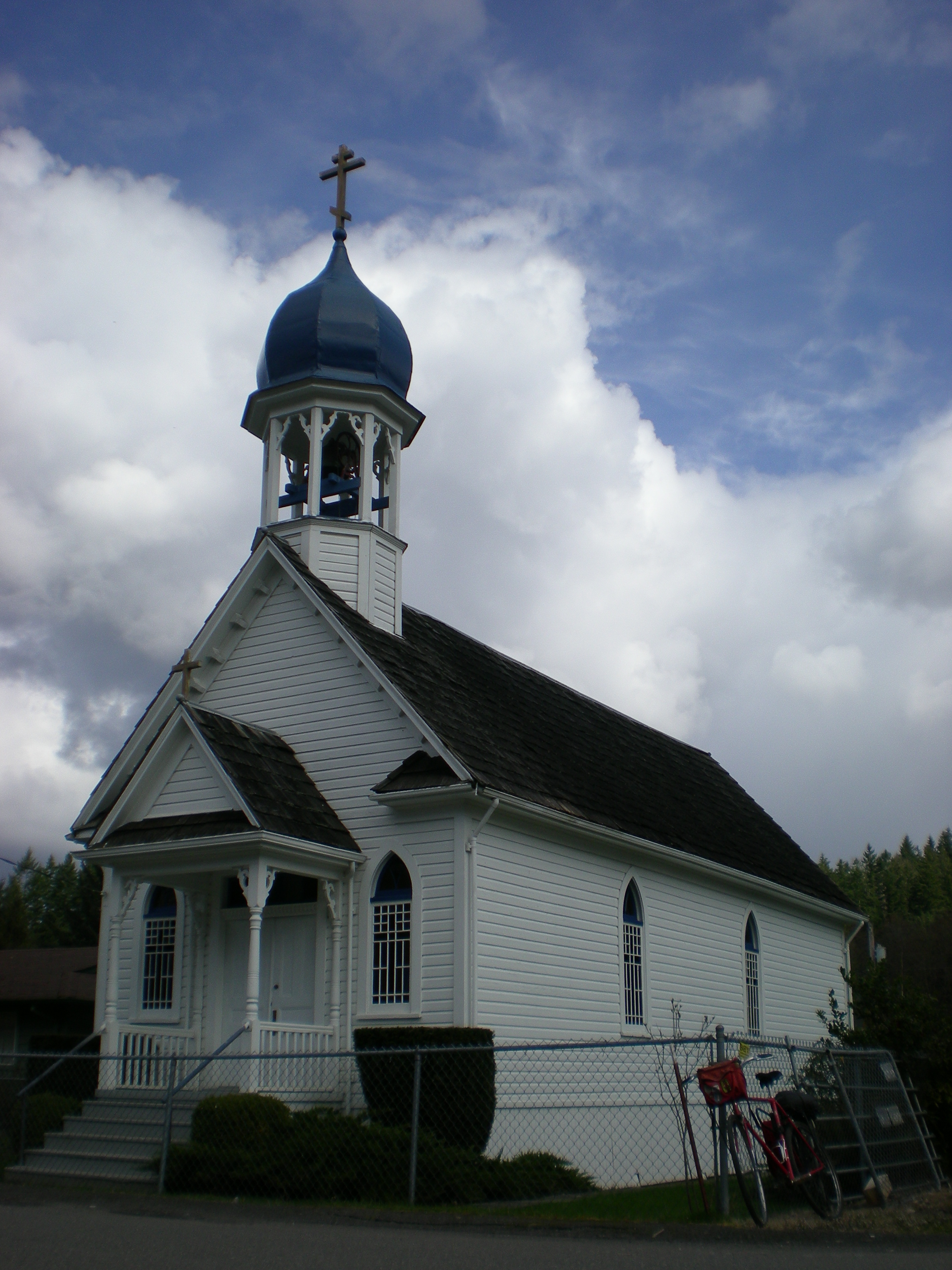

- Location within Washington (state)
- Location: 431 Long St., Wilkeson, Washington
- Coordinates: 47°6′27″N 122°2′42″W
- Area: less than one acre
- Architectural style: Gothic Revival
- NRHP reference No.: 89001606
- Added to NRHP: September 28, 1989

Holy Trinity Orthodox Church is a historic church in Wilkeson, Washington. The church was founded by Eastern European Slavic immigrants from the Carpathian Mountains of eastern Czechoslovakia. It was built in a Gothic Revival style and was added to the National Register in 1989. Holy Trinity Orthodox Church is the oldest Orthodox church in Washington State. The building is a simple design that blends the lines of an American Gothic meetinghouse with the onion dome and interior iconography of the Slavic Orthodox faith. The church has served the Eastern European community across the mining towns of eastern Pierce County.

== History ==
As early as 1862 deposits of coal were found along the Carbon River. In 1869, Samuel Wilkeson conducted a geological survey for the Northern Pacific Railroad. Wanting access to a convenient source of coal near the Tacoma railhead, the Northern Pacific built a line to the coal fields in 1876, opening a mine three years later. Initially, the coal was used as locomotive fuel. But in the 1880s, the coal suitable for coke was discovered, and in 1885 the Tacoma Coal and Coke Company built the first coke ovens. By the 1890s, the Wilkeson Coal and Coke Company operated over one hundred beehive ovens. Hundreds of immigrants were brought in to work the mines and ovens. Many from Southern and Eastern Europe. The Wilkeson area continued as a center of coal and coke production through World War I. The town also supported sandstone quarries and logging operations. By 1916, coke production reached a peak with an estimated 1,200 people lived in the town. Industry remained active in Wilkeson until 1936 when the Wilkeson Coal and Coke Company ceased operations.

Immigrants to the Wilkeson area in the late 19th century included a group of miners from the Carpathian Mountains of present-day Zakarpattia Oblast in western Ukraine. The majority were members of the Orthodox church. In the late 1890s, the group organized the Holy Trinity congregation and built a wooden church. Pierce County records date the building to 1900. Beginning with a congregation of 42 and a monthly visit by pastor, Father Dimitri Kamnev of the Seattle, the community grew to 300 members at the height of the mining activities. Parishioners from across the region were of Russians, Slavic, Greeks, and Arabs origins, as this was the only Orthodox church in Pierce County.

== Appearance ==
Holy Trinity Orthodox Church is a simple frame structure combining the Gothic vernacular form of an American country church with the distinctive onion dome and interior iconography of a traditional Slavic Orthodox temple. The building features a gable roof, arched windows, and a belfry with ogee dome. The one-story church is in a residential neighborhood a few blocks from the business district. It is rectangular in plan and measures approximately 19 feet (5.8 m) by 46 feet (14 m). The foundation is a post and pier design, with a wood skirt. The walls are sided with drop siding, plain corner and frieze boards. The roof is wood shingles. The cornices of the gable ends are underscored with plain square dentil blocks.

== Bibliography ==
- Lambert Floren, Historic Western Churches (Seattle: Superior Publishing, 1969), pp. 85–86.
- Esther Pearson, Early Churches of Washington State (Seattle: University of Washington Press, 1980), pp. 76–77.
- Constance Trasar, ed., Orthodox American, 1974-1976 (Syosset, New York: Orthodox Church, 1975), p. 36.
- The Alaskan Russian Church Archives: Records of the Russian Orthodox Greek Catholic Church of North America (Washington: Library of Congress, 1984).
