= Wilkeson Coke Ovens =

- Coke Ovens
- U.S. National Register of Historic Places
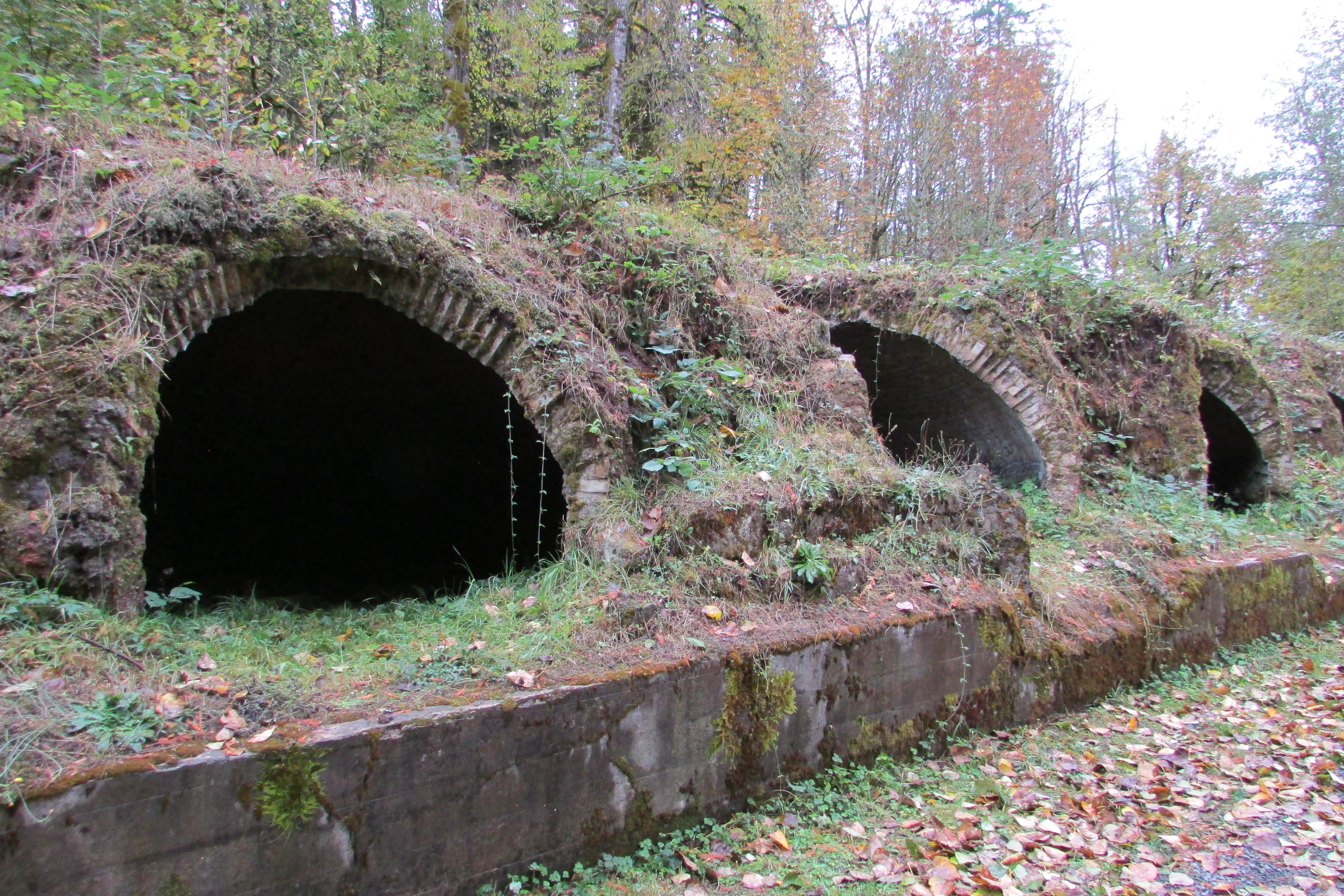
- Wilkeson Coke Ovens

- Location within Washington (state) Location within the United States
- Nearest city: Wilkeson, Washington
- Coordinates: 47°06′09″N 122°02′21″W
- Area: less than one acre
- Built: 1885
- NRHP reference No.: 74001976
- Added to NRHP: June 10, 1974

The Wilkeson Coke Ovens are from the early industrial period in Washington. The ovens are a result of the growth of the railroad in Puget Sound. Washington's coal industry was an enterprise with much promise but has never grown. It has remains a subdued element in the history of the Puget Sound Region. The Pierce County beehive coke ovens, of which those at Wilkeson were the most numerous and active, were the sole supply of coke in the coastal area. The coke ovens were added to the National Register of Historic Places on June 10, 1974.

== Description ==
The beehive-shaped brick ovens are approximately 8 feet (2.4 m) high and 12 feet (3.7 m) in diameter, covered with 6 inches (150 mm) of cement with a small hole on top. A protective 10 feet (3.0 m) high sandstone wall that faced the ovens was removed in the late 1940s, resulting in some erosion of the earth covering the ovens. Only 30 of the original 160 ovens remain.

== History ==
The growing interest in building a railroad to the Pacific Ocean led a survey of the resources of along coast region. The War Department made surveys of various routes. The results of the expeditions were later incorporated into a series of reports.

Coal was known as early as 1862 or 1863. It is assumed that these were the beds along the Carbon River, whose steep canyon reveals outcrops of thick seams of coal. The topography in the canyon was not favorable for exploration, but other outcrops can be found along South Prairie Creek and the tributaries of the Puyallup River were more accessible and prospecting was done from 1874 to 1883.

== Bibliography ==
- Daniels, Joseph. Coal Fields of Pierce County. Division of Geology Bulletin #10, Olympia, 1914. Washington Geological Survey. Annual Report 1902, Vol. 2.
- Wilkeson Area Coal Study. U.S. Area Redevelopment Administration, 1963.
- "Pierce County Town has Varied History", Tacoma News Tribune, August 2, 1964, Page 5.
