= Wilkeson School =

- U.S. National Register of Historic Places
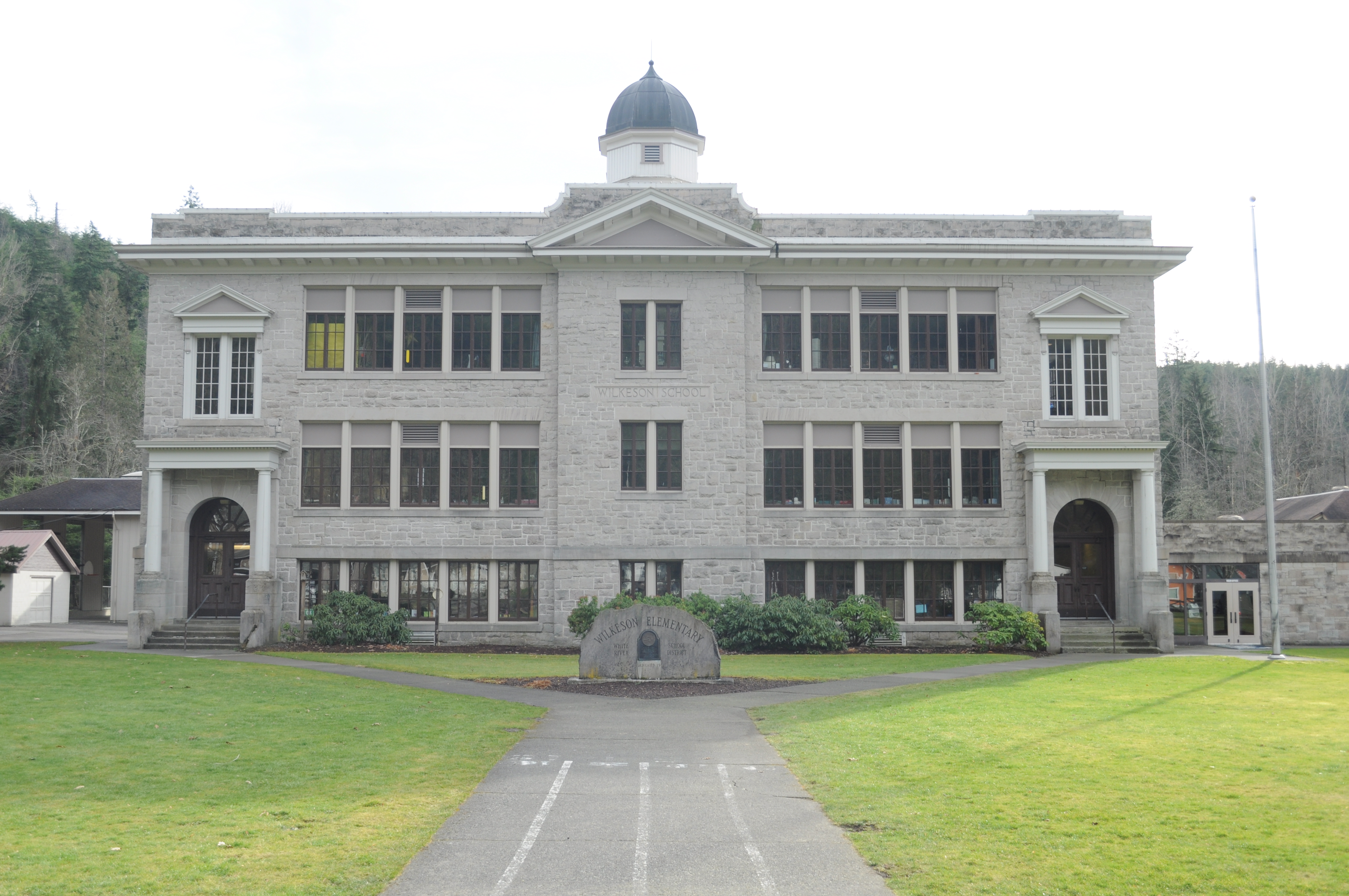
- Wilkeson School

- Location within Washington (state) Location within the United States
- Location: Off WA 165, Wilkeson, Washington
- Coordinates: 47°06′06″N 122°02′30″W
- Area: less than one acre
- Built: 1912
- Architect: Frederick Heath
- Architectural style: Classical Revival
- NRHP reference No.: 76001905
- Added to NRHP: October 8, 1976

Wilkeson School is a public elementary school building in Wilkeson, Washington. Built in 1912 and still in operation, it was added to the National Register of Historic Places in 1976.

== History ==
On a reconnaissance trip for the Northern Pacific Railroad in 1869, Samuel Wilkeson located vast coal and sandstone deposits. In 1876 the railroad built a line from Tacoma to the Wilkeson vicinity to develop the coal deposits. The town of Wilkeson started as a small camp near the coal mines.

The town's school cost $26,985 to build, financed by bonds issued by the school district. It served the first 8 grades of students.

In 1913, a student at the school sued the principal for whipping him. After two trials, the principal was acquitted.

In 1971, the school was closed due to a levy defeat, and was leased for some time by a local church. At an unknown date, the building was reopened as a school. The school underwent internal renovations during the 2017–2018 school year.

== Description ==
The Wilkeson School is a classical structure located at the south end of the village of Wilkeson. The building is surrounded by grassy lawn bounded to the rear by wooded ridges. Wilkeson School is a two-story sandstone building with a full basement. The front of the school has two entrances with columns on either side of each entrance and a central cupola. The bell tower in the cupola is covered in copper. The school is built of locally quarried sandstone.

The school is a simple rectangle. The building shows the influence of the Neo-Classical Revival in its size and detail. The load-bearing walls of locally quarried, cut sandstone are laid in broken courses. The sandstone itself resembles granite, being light grey in color and non-friable in texture. The school has ornamental details in wood. The design is a combination of the Doric and Tuscan orders. A wooden cornice has mutules that surround the entire structure and is topped by a sandstone parapet wall. The flat roof slopes toward the back of the building. A wood-framed bell tower covered with sheet copper is centered.

The street facade has five major bays. The central bay projects forward. Two entrances are recessed behind arched openings. Doric columns on stone walls are constructed of vertical wooden planks. These columns support fully projecting entablatures with moulded, dentilled cornices.

== Bibliography ==
- The Northwest. May–June, 1968. "Quarrying Wilkeson's Sandstone", pp. 13–15.
- The Seattle Times. January 9, 1972. Sunday Pictorial. "Wilkeson: Hard Rock and Hearty Men." pp. 8–13.
- Stone: Ten Thousand Years Ago and Now. Muriel Cambern. Walker Cut Stone Company (Tacoma, 1925).
- The Wilkeson Record: Industrial Number. (Wilkeson, c. 1917). pp. 23–34.
