= Benjamin C. Truman =

American journalist and author (1835–1916)

Benjamin Cummings Truman (October 25, 1835 – July 18, 1916), was an American journalist and author; in particular, he was a distinguished war correspondent during the American Civil War, and an authority on duels. Truman could also be described as a polymath, or at least peripatetic. Upon his death, the New York Times (where he had worked in the 1850s) wrote, "He became, in his long career, a school principal, a feature writer, a proofreader, war correspondent, dramatic critic, composer of war songs, a playwright, confidential secretary to Andrew Johnson and an officer on his staff, a major in the army, a special agent of the Treasury Department, a paymaster In the army, a Washington correspondent, special agent for the Postoffice Department in charge of the Pacific Coast, an owner of five newspapers, a volunteer fireman, one of Southern California's publicists, a great traveler, a judge of good wines, an expert in food, a noted story teller, and a man of many friends."

== Biography ==
He was born in Providence, Rhode Island, and attended public school in Providence, followed by a Shaker school in Canterbury, New Hampshire. After a year administering a district school in Merrimack County, New Hampshire, he returned to Providence and learned typesetting. He was a compositor and a proofreader for The New York Times from 1855 to 1859, and later worked for John W. Forney in Philadelphia at the Press, and in Washington, D.C., for the Sunday Morning Chronicle.

When the Civil War began, he became a war correspondent, then declined a commission in 1862 to become a staff aide to Andrew Johnson, military governor of Tennessee, and Generals James S. Negley, John H. King and Kenner Garrard.

From Duelling in America 1992:

After the Civil War, Truman had a variety of jobs, serving for a time as a special agent of the Post Office Department on the West Coast, before going back into newspaper work. He shifted into public relations in the 1880s, promoting the state of California both in this country and abroad. After the turn of the century, he toured the Near East as a correspondent.

Besides his journalistic endeavors, Truman wrote numerous books, including several on California history, and even produced two plays. He is best known, however, for his work as a Civil War correspondent. Through energy, resourcefulness, and not a little luck, he was often able to beat his rivals to press with important stories. During his extensive travels in the South, he sent many insightful letters to the New York Times, documents that are considered some of the most important resources of the Reconstruction Era.

For his book The Field of Honor (1884), Truman collected accounts of significant European and American duels that illustrated the many variations of the code duello, as it was then known. The American portion of the book was reprinted as Duelling in America.

Truman owned five newspapers, including the San Diego Bulletin, where he lived for a time. He died on July 18, 1916, in Los Angeles, California.

== See also ==
- List of war correspondents of the American Civil War
