= Nathaniel Fillmore =

Father of Millard Fillmore

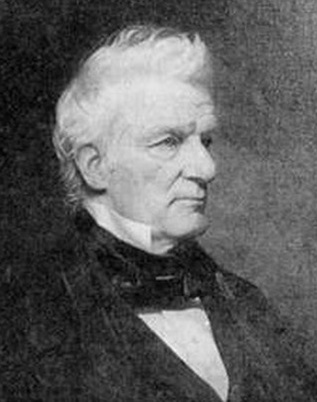
- Photograph c. 1851. Buffalo and Erie County Historical Society (Buffalo, New York).
- Born: Nathaniel Fillmore Jr. April 19, 1771; Bennington, Vermont, U.S.
- Died: March 28, 1863 (aged 91); East Aurora, New York, U.S.
- Burial place: East Aurora Cemetery, East Aurora, New York
- Occupation: Farmer
- Spouses: Phoebe Millard (m. 1796; died 1831) Eunice Love (m. 1834)
- Children: Olive; Millard; Cyrus; Almon; Calvin; Julia; Darius; Charles; Phoebe
- Parents: Hepzibah Wood; Nathaniel Fillmore Sr.
- Relatives: Calvin Fillmore (brother)

Nathaniel Fillmore Jr. (April 19, 1771 – March 28, 1863), was an American farmer. He was the father of U.S. president Millard Fillmore. A native of Bennington, Vermont, he farmed there until he was in his mid-twenties when his brother Calvin and he moved to western New York. Duped by unscrupulous land agents, their titles proved defective and they lost their new farms. He became a tenant farmer and occasionally taught school; the Fillmore family's circumstances were so dire that they sometimes relied on the charity of their landlords to survive.

Over time, Fillmore's fortunes turned for the better. While living in Niles, New York he became prominent enough in the community to serve in local offices including justice of the peace. While living in Niles, he followed the advice of his wife and procured a clerk's position for their son Millard in the law office of Judge Walter Wood, who was also their landlord. This clerkship began Millard Fillmore's training to become an attorney, and placed him on the path to a legal and political career that culminated with the presidency.

Nathaniel Fillmore eventually bought a farm in East Aurora, which he developed into a successful venture, and which he continued to work on until well into his later years. Millard Fillmore became president in 1850, and his father visited him at the White House in 1851. He died in East Aurora in 1863, and was buried at East Aurora Cemetery.

== Early life ==
Nathaniel Fillmore Jr. was born in Bennington, Vermont on April 19, 1771, a son of Nathaniel Fillmore Sr. and Hepzibah Wood. He was educated in Bennington, and worked on his father's farm as a young man.

After his marriage, Fillmore began farming in Bennington. Shortly thereafter, Nathaniel and his brother Calvin Fillmore were approached by land agents offering tracts in Western New York state. Unhappy with trying to make the stony ground of their Vermont farms productive, they quickly grabbed the opportunity and moved to Cayuga County, New York, sight unseen.

== Move to New York ==
According to biographers of Millard Fillmore, "The Fillmore brothers moved their two families to their new homeland nestled deep within a timber-laden forest. Location was not their greatest problem. Nor was the dense clay they unearthed once the land was cleared. Their greatest setback came with the realization that faulty surveying coupled with corrupt local government officials had left them with virtually nothing." The Fillmore brothers lost their land because of defective titles. Duped, tired, and poor, Nathaniel eventually became a tenant farmer while occasionally teaching school, working the soil for landlords and taking their charity when necessary to survive.

Over time, Nathaniel Fillmore's fortunes changed; he became prominent enough while living in Niles, New York that he served as a justice of the peace for eleven years. (Note: According to his obituary, Fillmore's judgment was so highly regarded that only one litigant ever appealed a verdict, and the appeal was unsuccessful.) He eventually purchased a farm in East Aurora, New York which he developed into a productive enterprise, and on which he continued to be active until well into his old age. (Note: Portions of Nathaniel Fillmore's farm near the intersections of Olean and Lapham Roads in East Aurora are still visible.) While living in Niles, Fillmore followed his wife's advice to secure a clerk’s position for their son Millard in the law office of their landlord, Judge Walter Wood. Though Millard did not complete the clerkship, it set him on the eventual path to a successful legal and political career that carried him to the presidency.

== Later life ==
Millard Fillmore assumed the presidency in 1850, and Nathaniel visited him at the White House in 1851. President Fillmore and his wife anticipated this visit more than any other, and were concerned that some circumstance requiring Fillmore's attention might prevent it. The other guests at the formal reception Nathaniel Fillmore attended expected to see someone elderly and infirm, given that Millard Fillmore was then 51 years old. They were surprised to meet a man, then approaching 80, who noticeably resembled Millard Fillmore, and was in such good health that he did not appear old enough to be the president's father. Questioned by a guest who wanted to know how to raise a son to become president, Nathaniel Fillmore alluded to his one-time poverty by replying "Cradle him in a sap trough."

== Death and burial ==
Fillmore died in East Aurora, New York on March 28, 1863. He was buried at East Aurora Cemetery, also known as Pioneer Cemetery.

== Family ==
In 1796, the 25 year-old Fillmore married fifteen year-old Phoebe Millard, daughter of a prominent physician, in Bennington. Together, they had nine children:

- Olive Fillmore (1797–1883)
- Millard Fillmore (1800–1874)
- Cyrus Fillmore (1801–1889)
- Almon Fillmore (1806–1830)
- Calvin Fillmore (1810–1879)
- Julia Fillmore (1812–1891)
- Darius Fillmore (1814–1837)
- Charles Fillmore (1817–1854)
- Phoebe Fillmore (1819–1843)

After Phoebe died in 1831, he remarried to Eunice Love in 1834.
