= List of war correspondents of the American Civil War =

This is a list of war correspondents of the American Civil War and the outlets for which they typically reported. Overall there were about 600 different newspaper reporters covering the war.

- Peter W. Alexander, Savannah Republican
- A. Homer Byington, New York Tribune
- Thomas Morris Chester, Philadelphia Press
- Charles Carleton Coffin, Boston Journal
- William George, pen name "De Soto," The New York Times
- Felix Gregory de Fontaine, Charleston Courier
- Thomas W. Knox, New York Herald
- Karl Marx, New York Tribune and The Vienna Presse
- Joseph B. McCullagh
- Daniel Kane O'Donnell, Philadelphia Press
- U.H. Painter, Philadelphia Inquirer
- Whitelaw Reid, pen name "Agate," Cincinnati Gazette
- William Howard Russell, London Times
- George W. Smalley, New York Tribune
- Stephe R. Smith, alias "S. R. Smith" Cincinnati Enquirer
- Benjamin C. Truman, Philadelphia Press and New York Times
- Samuel Wilkeson Jr., The New York Times

== See also ==
- Photographers of the American Civil War
- Alfred Waud, war artist
- Theodore R. Davis, war artist
