= The Carlson Block =

Pizza restaurant in Wilkeson, Washington

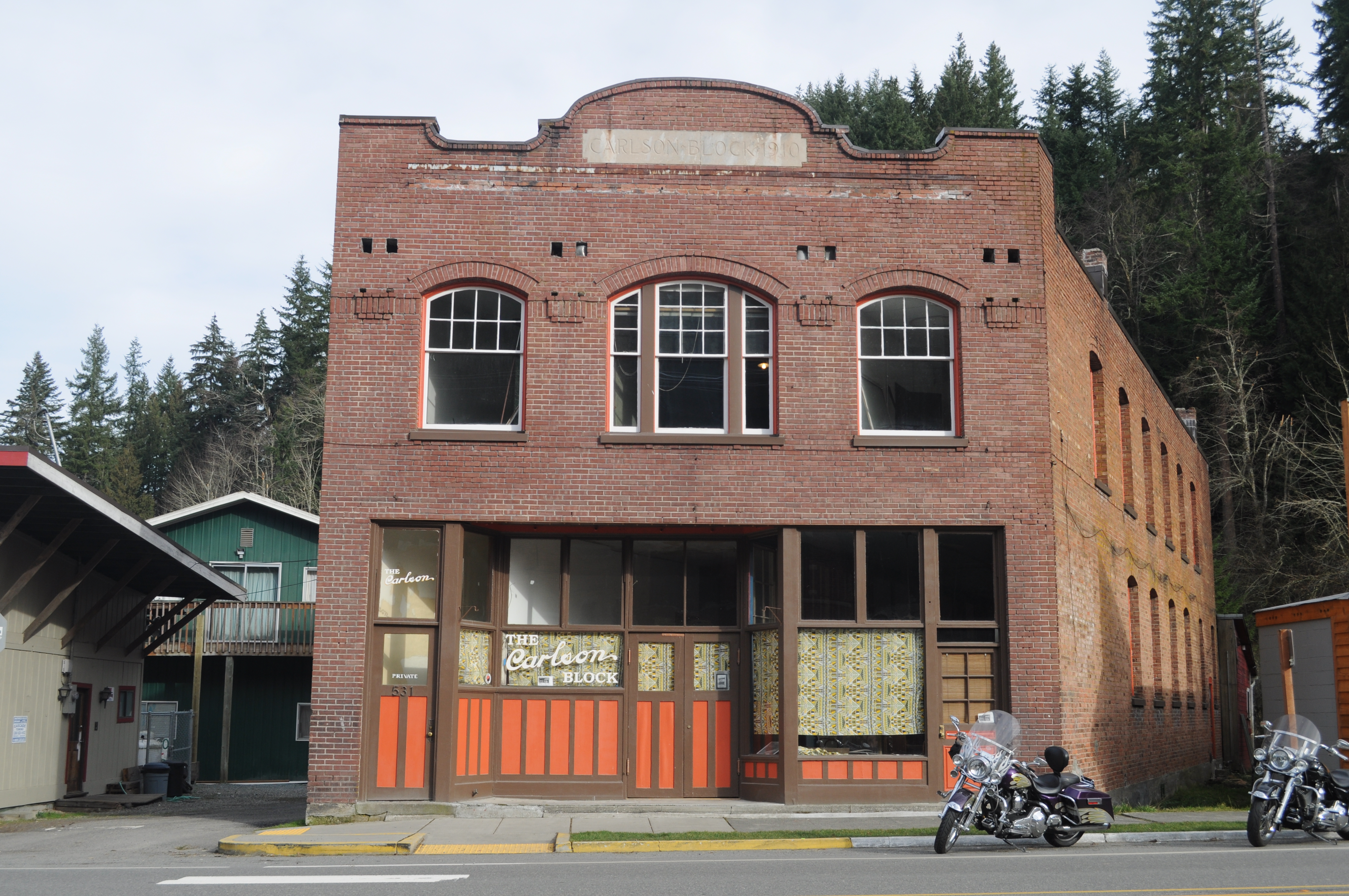
- The Carlson Block building in February 2012.

Restaurant information
- Food type: Italian pizzeria
- Location: 531 Church Street, Wilkeson, Pierce County, Washington, 98396, United States
- Website: https://www.carlsonblock.com/

The Carlson Block is a pizza restaurant in a century-old building in Wilkeson, Washington. The sourdough crust pizza, described as "the best in Washington state" by The Seattle Times, is made in a wood-fired oven by chef and owner, Ian Galbraith. The restaurant opened c. early 2017, six years after the owner created the sourdough mother. Galbraith graduated from Fife High School and later attended Culinary Institute of America.
