= Calvin Fillmore =

American politician (1775–1865)

Member of the New York State Assembly
- In office January 1, 1825 – December 31, 1825
- Preceded by: Samuel Wilkeson
- Succeeded by: Reuben B. Babcock
- Constituency: Erie County

Personal details
- Born: April 30, 1775 Bennington County, Vermont
- Died: October 22, 1865 (aged 90) East Aurora, New York, US
- Resting place: East Aurora Cemetery, East Aurora, New York, US
- Party: Democratic-Republican; Democratic
- Spouse: Jerusha Turner (m. 1798)
- Relations: Nathaniel Fillmore (brother); Millard Fillmore (nephew)
- Occupation: Farmer; Businessman

Calvin Fillmore (April 30, 1775 – October 22, 1865) was an American farmer and politician from New York. He served as coroner of Erie County, New York and a member of the New York State Assembly, and was an uncle of President Millard Fillmore.

== Life ==
Fillmore was born in Bennington County, Vermont on December 12, 1775. His father, Nathaniel Fillmore Sr., was a farmer and officer in the Green Mountain Boys who was a veteran of the American Revolution.

Calvin Fillmore was educated in Bennington, and became a farmer. In 1798, he married Jerusha Turner (d. 1852). Fillmore was close with his brother Nathaniel Fillmore, and in 1798, they moved to an area then located in Onondaga County, New York, which is now in Summerhill, Cayuga County.

During the War of 1812, Fillmore was appointed a captain in the 13th Infantry Regiment of the New York Militia, and took part in several battles in upstate New York and Canada. He was promoted to major, and then lieutenant colonel, and commanded the regiment before the end of the war. He later served as lieutenant colonel of the militia's 17th Regiment.

In 1819, Nathaniel and Calvin Fillmore and their families moved to Montville, then in the Town of Sempronius, now in Moravia. Later they moved to East Aurora, in Erie County. In addition to farming, he kept a tavern and hotel, and owned a sawmill and other businesses. He also became involved in the development of the local transportation infrastructure as an original incorporator of the Aurora and Buffalo Railroad.

Fillmore was coroner of Erie County, and a deputy U.S. marshal. He was a member of the New York State Assembly (Erie Co.) in 1825, elected as a Democratic-Republican. He was later active in the Democratic Party.

He died in East Aurora on October 22, 1865, and was buried at East Aurora Cemetery.

U.S. President Millard Fillmore was his nephew.

== Sources ==
- Brogan, Hugh; Mosley, Charles (1993). American Presidential Families. Stroud, England: Alan Sutton. ISBN 9780750905824.
- Cutter, William Richard (1912). Genealogical and Family History of Western New York. Vol. 2. New York, NY: Lewis Historical Publishing.
- New York State Legislature (1852). Documents of the Assembly of the State of New York. Vol. 7. Albany, NY: C. Van Benthuysen.
- Smith, Henry Perry (1884). History of the City of Buffalo and Erie County. Vol. 1. Syracuse, NY: D. Mason & Co.
- White, Truman C. (1898). Our County and Its People: A Descriptive Work on Erie County, New York. Vol. 1. Boston, MA: Boston History Company.

New York State Assembly
Preceded by Samuel Wilkeson	New York State Assembly; Erie County; 1825	Succeeded by Reuben B. Babcock
