= Samuel Wilkeson =

American politician

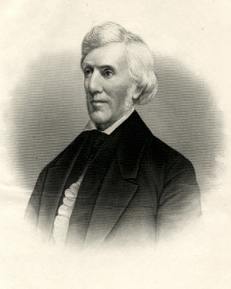

5th Mayor of Buffalo, New York
- In office 1836–1837
- Preceded by: Hiram Pratt
- Succeeded by: Josiah Trowbridge

Member of the New York State Senate for the 8th district
- In office January 1, 1825 – December 31, 1828
- Preceded by: David Eason
- Succeeded by: Moses Hayden

Member of the New York State Assembly for the Erie County
- In office January 1, 1824 – December 31, 1824
- Preceded by: Ebenezer F. Norton
- Succeeded by: Calvin Fillmore

Personal details
- Born: June 1, 1781 Carlisle, Pennsylvania
- Died: July 7, 1848 (aged 67) near Tellico Plains, Tennessee
- Party: People's Party, Clintonian
- Spouse(s): Jane Oram; Sarah St. John; Mary Peters
- Relations: Samuel Wilkeson Jr. (son), Frank Wilkeson (grandson)
- Children: 6

Samuel Wilkeson (June 1, 1781 – July 7, 1848) was a merchant, politician, and judge who served as mayor of Buffalo, New York.

== Early life ==
He was born in Carlisle, Pennsylvania, on June 1, 1781. He was a child of John Wilkeson and Mary (née Robinson) Wilkeson, immigrant farms from the north of Ireland.

After the death of his father around 1802, Wilkeson moved to Mahoning County, Ohio, where he built a farm and the first grist mill in the area.

== Career ==
During the War of 1812, Wilkeson was asked to build a fleet of ships for the U.S. Army at Buffalo, brought his family there, and opened a general store. In 1815, he became the village's first justice of the peace and later chosen as a village trustee. He was a member of the Buffalo Harbor Company that brought the terminus of the Erie Canal to Buffalo, versus its rival Black Rock.

In the early 1820s, he led the project to improve the harbor to make it suitable as the canal terminus. In February 1821, Wilkeson was appointed First Judge of the Court of Common Pleas and held this position until 1824. In the early 1820s he went into partnership with Ebenezer Johnson (Buffalo's first mayor) in shipping and real estate enterprises, and once owned the land on which the Buffalo City Hall now stands. His later ventures included building the first steam boiler in Buffalo and operating foundries or factories in several areas of the city.

=== Public office ===
In 1823, Samuel Wilkeson was elected to the New York State Assembly as a People's Party candidate serving from January 1, 1824, to December 31, 1824, when he was succeeded by Calvin Fillmore. In 1824, he was elected as a Clintonian (supporters of DeWitt Clinton, opposed to the Bucktails) to the New York State Senate, serving until 1829 in one of the four seats in the 8th district, which consisted of Allegany, Cattaraugus, Chautauqua, Erie, Genesee, Livingston, Monroe, Niagara, and Steuben counties. In 1836, he was elected to replace Hiram Pratt, the mayor of Buffalo. During his term he focused on law enforcement issues and presided over a city in the depths of a nationwide financial depression.

After his term in 1838, he became general agent of the American Colonization Society, who wanted to colonize African-Americans in Liberia.

== Personal life ==
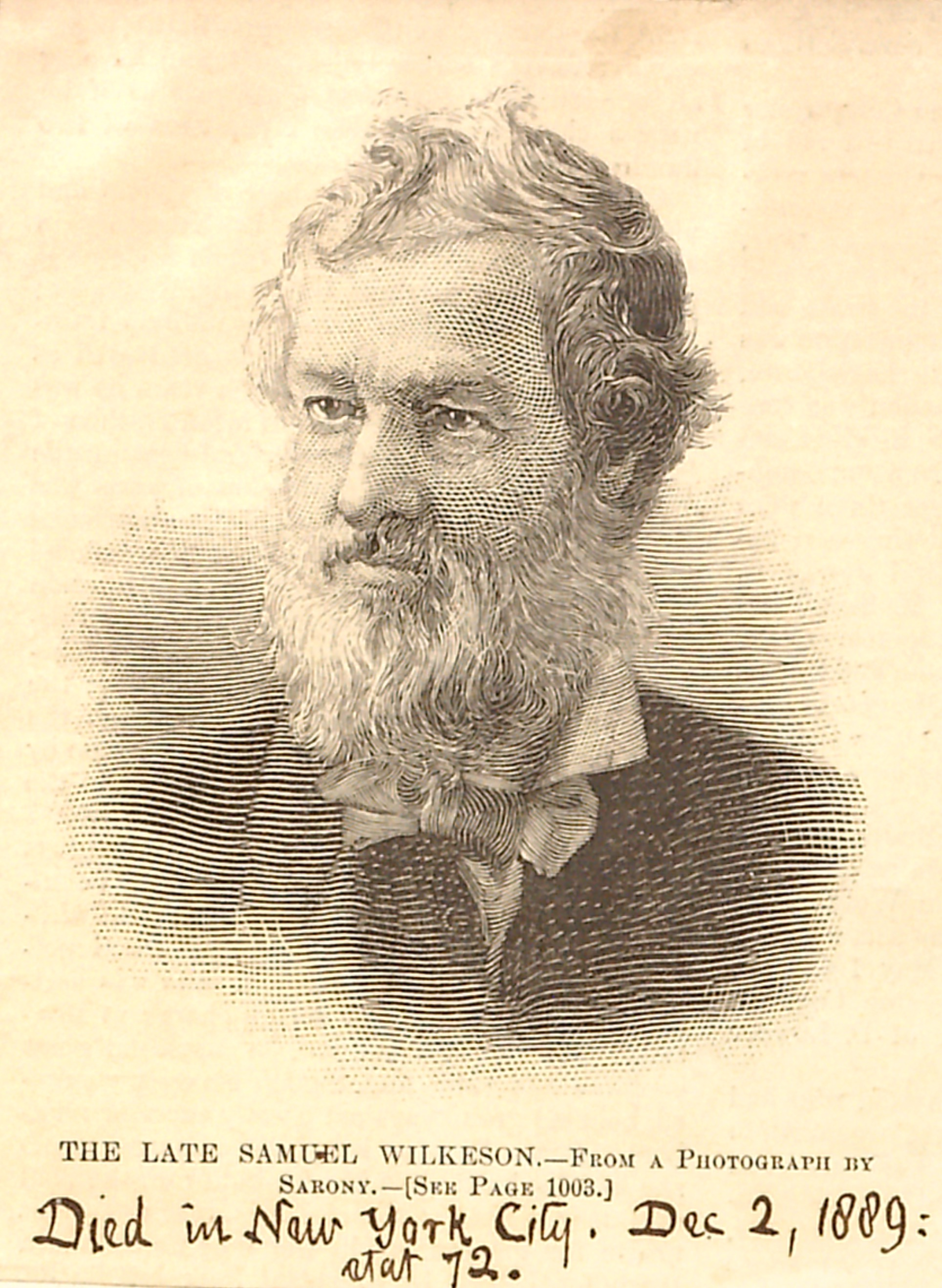
Wilkeson's youngest son, Samuel Wilkeson Jr.

Around 1802 he married Jane Oram, daughter of James Oram who was of Scotch-Irish extraction and served in the Revolutionary War. They later moved to Buffalo where his father built the Wilkeson Mansion in 1824, across Lafayette Square from the home of his close friend, President Millard Fillmore. Jane was the mother of all six of his children, including:

- Elizabeth Wilkeson, who married Dr. Henry A. Stagg, a distinguished Buffalo physician.
- John Wilkeson (1806–1894), who married Maria Louisa Wilkes (1813–1843), President John Tyler appointed him U.S. Consul to Turk's Islands in the West Indies. His son John Wilkes Wilkeson was killed in action at the Battle of Seven Pines during the American Civil War.
- Eli Reed Wilkeson (1809–1849), who was interested in the volunteer fire department.
- William Wilkeson (1811–1882), who ran in iron foundry on Court Street in Buffalo.
- Louise Wilkeson (1811–1860), who married Mortimer Johnson, nephew of Ebenezer Johnson. Their daughter, Flora Johnson was the wife of artist William Holbrook Beard.
- Samuel Wilkeson Jr. (1817–1889), who married Catherine Henry Cady (1820–1899), a daughter of Daniel Cady and granddaughter of James Livingston. Her sister was the prominent suffragist Elizabeth Cady Stanton.

He later married Sarah St. John of Buffalo (a friend of Harriet Martineau). After her death, he married Mary Peters of New Haven, Connecticut, "who was a famous educator of girls."

He died on July 7, 1848, on his way to visit his daughter who was now living in Tellico Plains, Tennessee. His body was brought back to Buffalo and buried in Forest Lawn Cemetery. His home stood until 1915 when it as torn down, only to be replaced by a gas station. It later became the site of Buffalo City Hall built in 1932.

=== Descendants ===
Altogether, eight of Wilkeson's grandsons served in the Union Army during the Civil War.

=== Honors ===
“Wilkeson Pointe”, a recreation area in Buffalo Harbor State Park is named for him.

Political offices
Preceded by Hiram Pratt	Mayor of Buffalo, New York; 1836–1837	Succeeded by Josiah Trowbridge
New York State Senate
Preceded by David Eason	New York State Senate; 8th district (Class 2); 1825–1828	Succeeded by Moses Hayden
New York State Assembly
Preceded by Ebenezer F. Norton	New York State Assembly; Erie County; 1824	Succeeded by Calvin Fillmore
