= Frank Wilkeson =

American journalist

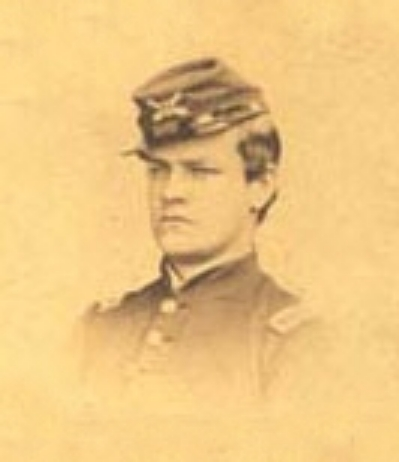
Frank Wilkeson

Frank Wilkeson (March 8, 1848 – April 22, 1913) was an American journalist, soldier, farmer and explorer. He wrote several books, including an autobiography of his service in the Union Army during the American Civil War. He was among the first white men to explore and map the Cascade Pass in the state of Washington.

== Early life and education ==
Wilkeson was born in Buffalo, New York, in 1848 to a prominent and wealthy family. He was the youngest son of famed journalist Samuel Wilkeson Jr. (1817–1889) and Catherine Cady, a sister of social activist Elizabeth Cady Stanton. Their next-door neighbor was U.S. President Millard Fillmore. One of his older brothers, Bayard Wilkeson, would be killed during the Civil War at the Battle of Gettysburg while commanding an artillery battery on what became known as Barlow's Knoll. Frank was educated at New London, Connecticut and at Phillips Academy in Andover, Massachusetts.

Their father, Samuel Wilkeson, was a newspaper correspondent who covered the Civil War for The New York Times and was present at Gettysburg during the battle in which 19-year-old Bayard was killed. A year later, 16-year-old Frank ran away from home and on March 26, 1864, joined the Union Army. Claiming he was an 18-year-old farmer, young Wilkeson enlisted in the 11th Battery of the New York Light Artillery.

== Career ==
=== Military career ===
Wilkeson was sent to serve in the Army of the Potomac in Virginia, where he took part in the Overland Campaign of General Ulysses S. Grant. Wilkeson's unit was not actively engaged in the Battle of the Wilderness on May 5–6, 1864, so Wilkeson, overcome by youthful curiosity, took an unauthorized leave of absence from his battery and fought as an infantryman alongside elements of General Winfield Scott Hancock's Second Corps using a discarded musket he picked up on the battlefield. The following day he returned to his battery where he was punished for his absenteeism, then diligently remained with them during the subsequent Battle of Spotsylvania Courthouse, Battle of Cold Harbor, and opening stages of the Siege of Petersburg.

Due to the political influence of his family, Wilkeson was offered a commission as a second lieutenant in the 4th U.S. Artillery. He initially declined the assignment which was first offered to him during the Battle of Cold Harbor, but several weeks later at Petersburg, suffering from what his memoirs indicate was post traumatic stress disorder (PTSD), he accepted the promotion and left the grueling life of a combat soldier behind. As an officer he was sent to help man the defenses of Washington, D.C., and later served in command of an artillery detachment guarding Confederate prisoners at Elmira Prison in Upstate New York. Finally, he was transferred to the Chattanooga, Tennessee, area as the war was winding down and Reconstruction beginning. He resigned his commission and was honorably discharged in March 1866.

=== Post-military career ===
After the war, Wilkeson worked as a mining engineer in Pennsylvania and married Mary Crouse in 1869. The couple then settled in Johnstown but in 1871 they moved to Gypsum, Kansas, where they managed a large cattle ranch and wheat farm.

In the 1880s, Wilkeson wrote for several newspapers including The New York Times, as well as contributing articles to periodicals such as Harper's Weekly.

A memoir of his military experiences, highly critical of how the war was conducted by corrupt politicians and incompetent officers, was published in 1887 under the title Recollections of a Private Soldier in the Army of the Potomac, 1864–1865. Wilkeson's book included a startling chapter entitled "How Men Die in Battle" that graphically described the various ways men were killed in combat during the Civil War particularly noting their facial expressions. Highly regarded by historians for its no-holds-barred style, the book was reprinted in 1997 as Turned Inside Out: Recollections of a Private Soldier in the Army of the Potomac (ISBN 9780803297999) with an introduction by Pulitzer Prize-winning author James M. McPherson.

He was active in the Democratic Party, and sought its nomination for representative to Kansas's 5th congressional district in 1908, but was not successful.

== Death ==
Wilkeson died from complications of diabetes at a hotel in Chelan, Washington, on April 22, 1913. He was buried in Gypsum Hill Cemetery in Salina, Kansas.

== Honors ==
The town of Wilkeson, Washington, was not named in his honor, but rather in honor of his father, Samuel Wilkeson.

== See also ==
- Samuel Wilkeson, Sr.
