= Wilkeson, Washington =

- Town
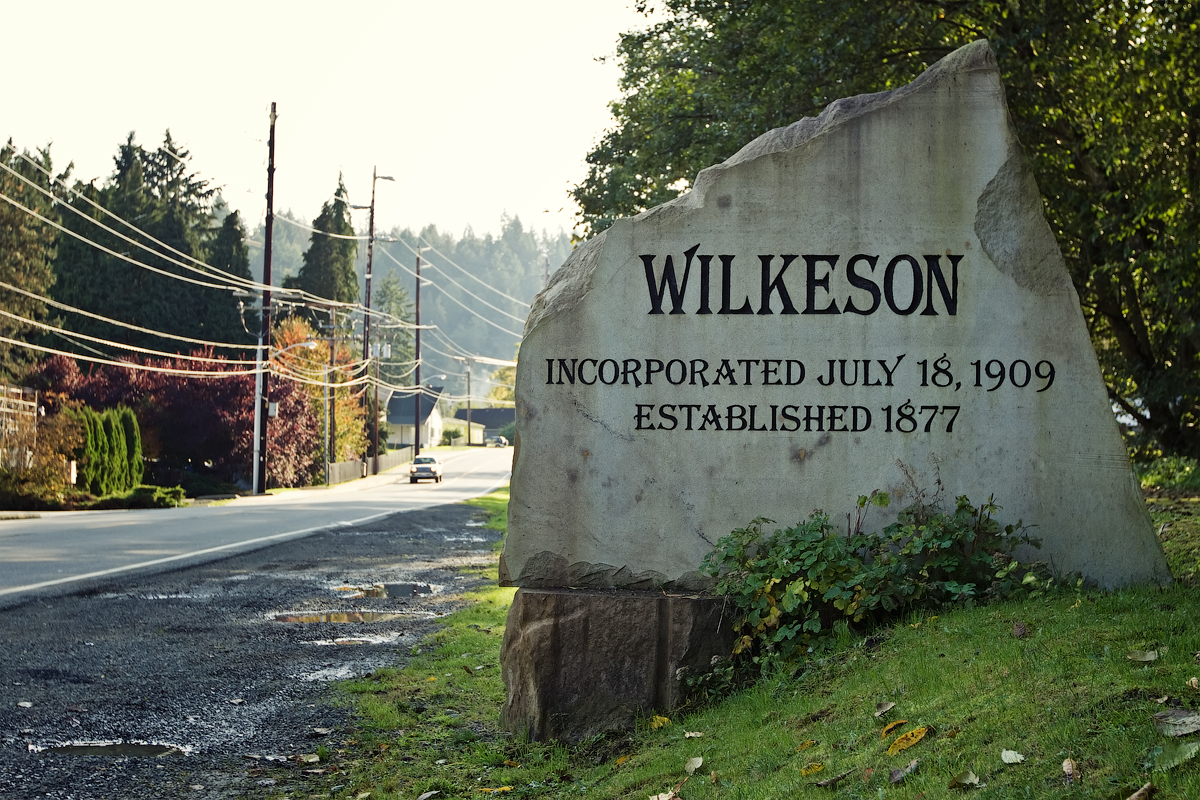

- Location of Wilkeson, Washington
- Coordinates: 47°06′12″N 122°02′58″W
- Country: United States
- State: Washington
- County: Pierce

Government
  - Type: Mayor–council
  - Mayor: Travis Waldher

Area
  - Total: 0.47 sq mi (1.21 km^{2})
  - Land: 0.47 sq mi (1.21 km^{2})
  - Water: 0 sq mi (0.00 km^{2})
- Elevation: 1,073 ft (327 m)

Population (2020)
  - Total: 499
  - Density: 1,102.5/sq mi (425.68/km^{2})
- Time zone: UTC-8 (Pacific (PST))
  - Summer (DST): UTC-7 (PDT)
- ZIP Code: 98396
- Area code: 360, 564
- FIPS code: 53-78925
- GNIS feature ID: 2413489

Wilkeson is a town in Pierce County, Washington, United States. The population was 499 at the 2020 census.

== History ==
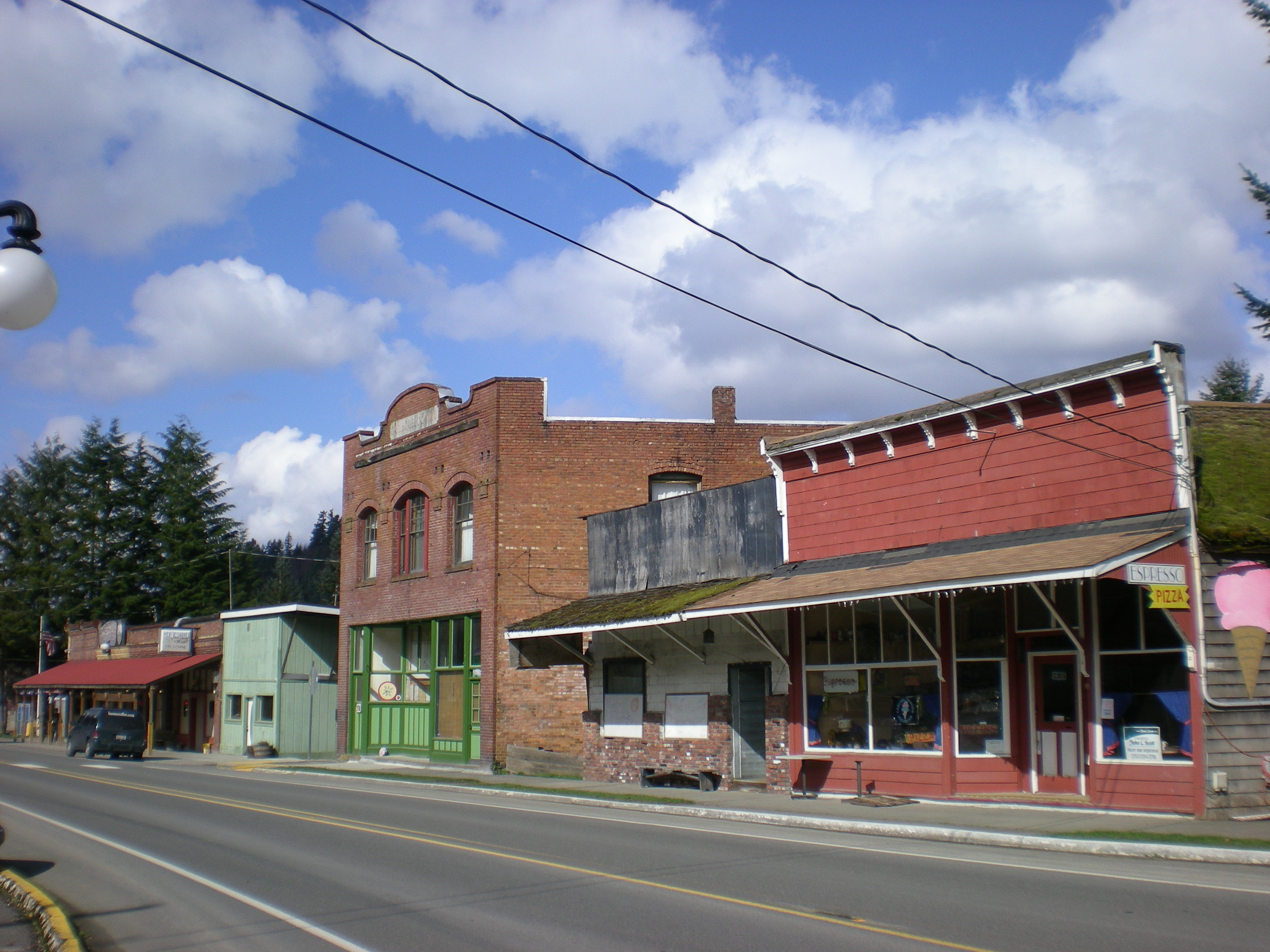
Downtown Wilkeson

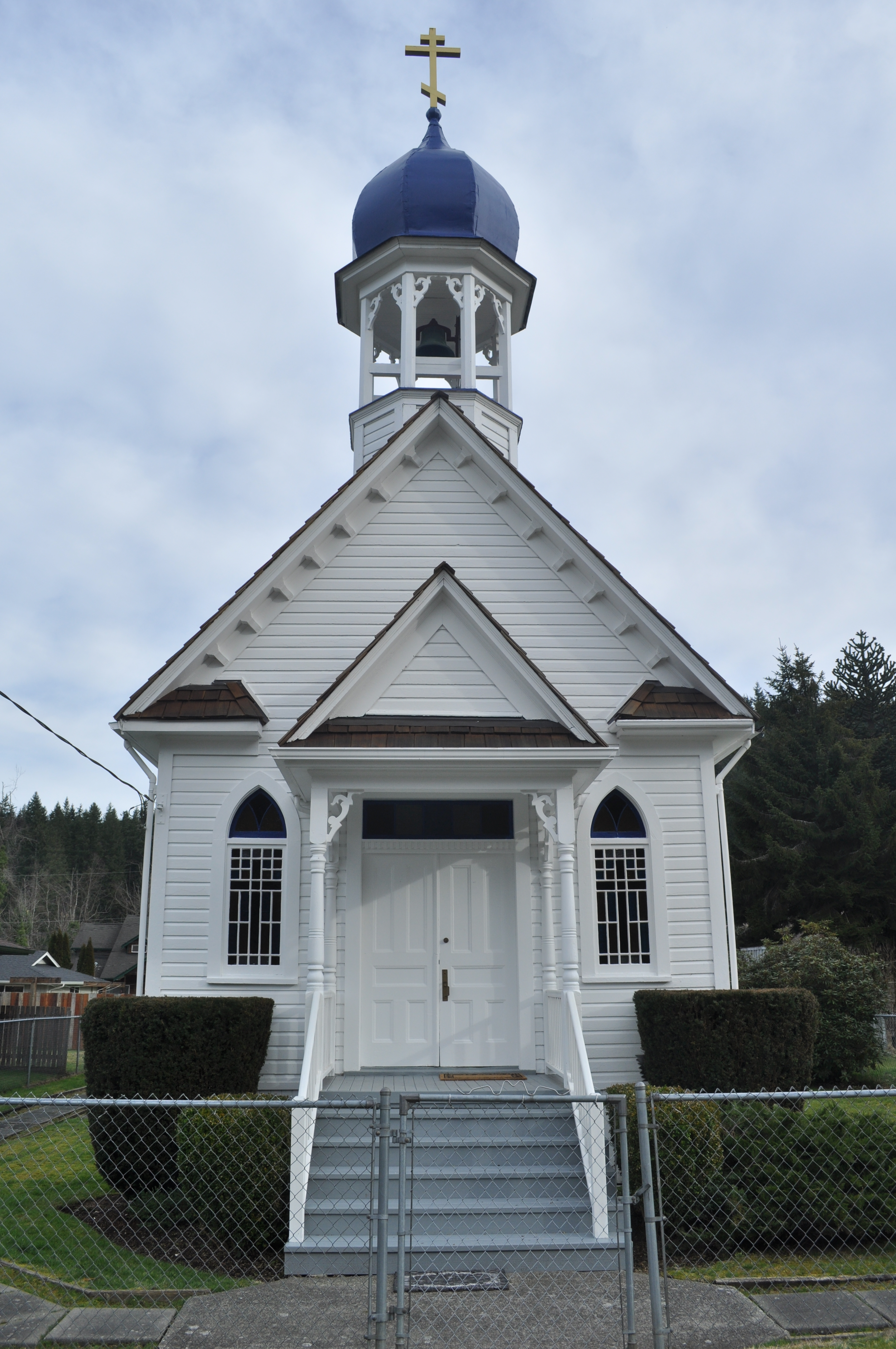
Holy Trinity Orthodox Church, built 1900, is a legacy of the many Eastern Europeans who came to work in the mines and quarries around Wilkeson.

Settlers searching for coal arrived in the area that became Wilkeson in the 1870s. By 1877, a Northern Pacific Railway line transported coal to Tacoma. Northern Pacific Railway president Henry Villard hired geologist Bailey Willis to direct field explorations of the coal fields around Wilkeson. Much of the property of Wilkeson was purchased by Northern Pacific Railway, with the remaining part of town known as Hope. In 1885, coke ovens were built by the Wilkeson Coal and Coke Company. In addition to coal, Wilkeson shipped timber and sandstone across Washington.

Wilkeson was officially incorporated on July 18, 1909. The town is named for Samuel Wilkeson, father of journalist and pioneer settler Frank Wilkeson.

At its peak, Wilkeson had a newspaper, cigar factory, two electric plants, two theaters, two bakeries, and a bottling plant. Much of the town burned down in 1910 and 1912 fires. By 1937, coke production in Wilkeson had ended.

Although it was known as a ghost town for a time, people began moving to Wilkeson in the late 20th century, many who commute to Enumclaw, Bellevue, and Seattle for work. Town improvements are paid for by a 160-acre tree farm managed by the town. Its new sewage treatment plant includes 900 feet of sewer lines replaced by volunteers. During this time, town management and activities were marked by a tension between a preservationist faction and an environmentalist faction.

== Geography ==
According to the United States Census Bureau, the town has a total area of 0.47 square miles (1.22 km^{2}), all of it land.

The community is situated between the town of Carbonado and the unincorporated community of Burnett. The city of Buckley is situated approximately 5 miles to the north.

Wilkeson is located near to the northwest corner of Mt. Rainier National Park. Access to the park is attainable south of the town at an entrance point at the Carbon River. Unimproved roads from the east of Wilkeson plunge deep into the park. One Road, FS 7720 leads to within 200 yards (180 m) of the Wilderness Boundary.

Surrounding places

=== Climate ===
This region experiences warm (but not hot) and dry summers, with no average monthly temperatures above 71.6 F (22 C). According to the Köppen Climate Classification system, Wilkeson has a warm-summer Mediterranean climate, abbreviated "Csb" on climate maps.

== Demographics ==
Historical population
| Census | Pop. | Note | %± |
|---|---|---|---|
| 1880 | 104 | | — |
| 1910 | 899 | | — |
| 1920 | 803 | | −10.7% |
| 1930 | 448 | | −44.2% |
| 1940 | 369 | | −17.6% |
| 1950 | 386 | | 4.6% |
| 1960 | 412 | | 6.7% |
| 1970 | 317 | | −23.1% |
| 1980 | 316 | | −0.3% |
| 1990 | 366 | | 15.8% |
| 2000 | 395 | | 7.9% |
| 2010 | 477 | | 20.8% |
| 2020 | 499 | | 4.6% |
U.S. Decennial Census; 2020 Census

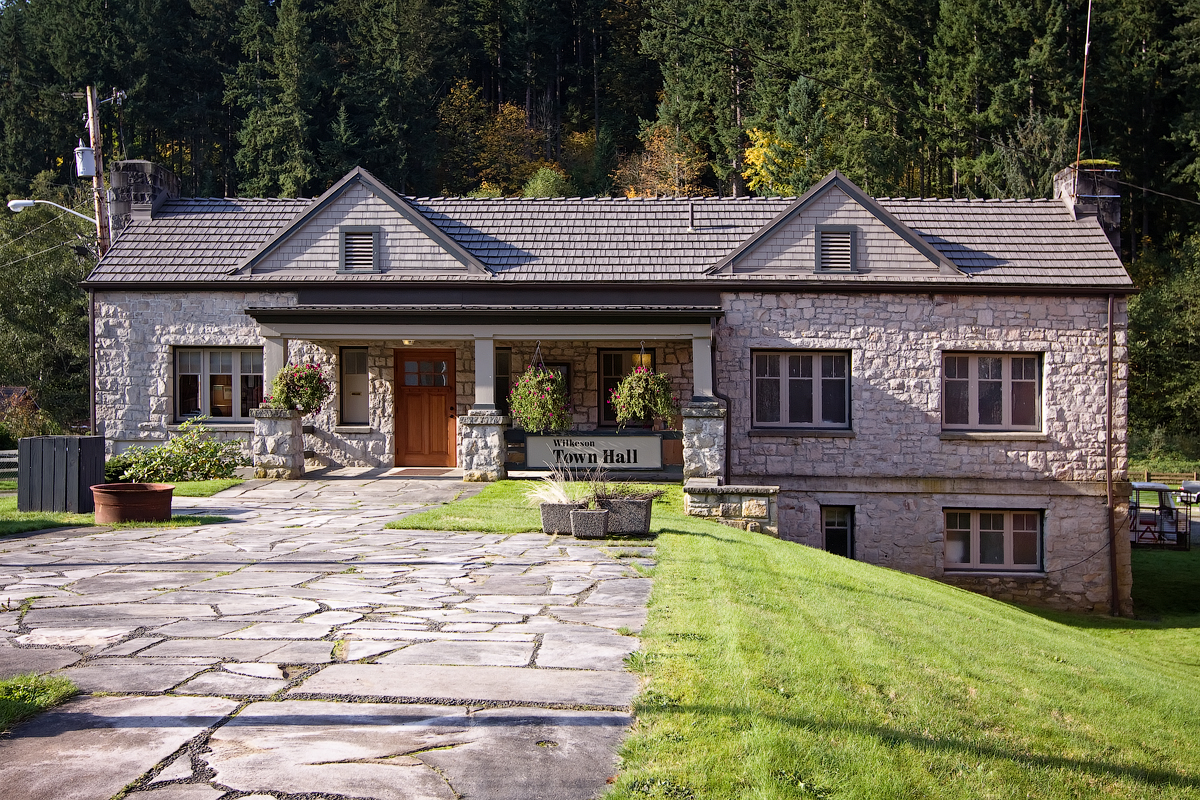
Wilkeson Town Hall

Wilkeson was once much larger, boasting a population of 1,437 in the 1910 census.

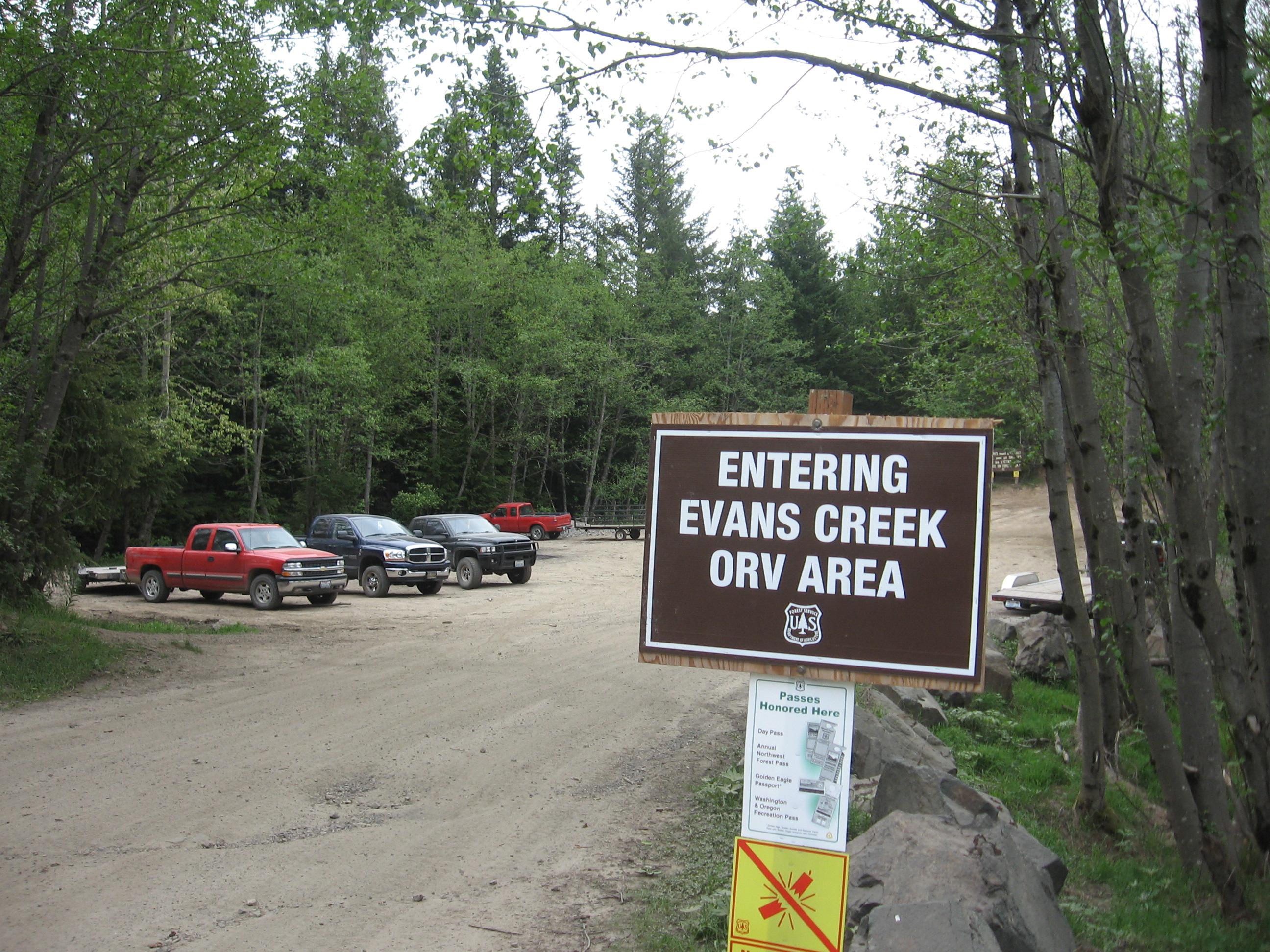
Evans Creek ORV (Off Road Vehicle) park at the base of Mt. Rainier, Washington, near the end of SR165.

=== 2010 census ===
As of the 2010 census, there were 477 people, 169 households, and 129 families living in the town. The population density was 1,014.9 inhabitants per square mile (391.9/km^{2}). There were 175 housing units at an average density of 372.3 per square mile (143.7/km^{2}). The racial makeup of the town was 96.2% White, 0.6% African American, 0.4% Native American, 2.3% from other races, and 0.4% from two or more races. Hispanic or Latino of any race were 3.4% of the population.

There were 169 households, of which 40.2% had children under the age of 18 living with them, 58.0% were married couples living together, 13.0% had a female householder with no husband present, 5.3% had a male householder with no wife present, and 23.7% were non-families. 21.3% of all households were made up of individuals, and 5.3% had someone living alone who was 65 years of age or older. The average household size was 2.82 and the average family size was 3.20.

The median age in the town was 33.9 years. 29.4% of residents were under the age of 18; 9% were between the ages of 18 and 24; 25.1% were from 25 to 44; 28.9% were from 45 to 64; and 7.5% were 65 years of age or older. The gender makeup of the town was 50.9% male and 49.1% female.

=== 2000 census ===
As of the 2000 census, there were 395 people, 140 households, and 100 families living in the town. The population density was 810.0 people per square mile (311.2/km^{2}). There were 150 housing units at an average density of 307.6 per square mile (118.2/km^{2}). The racial makeup of the town was 95.95% White, 1.01% Native American, and 3.04% from two or more races. Hispanic or Latino of any race were 1.52% of the population.

There were 140 households, out of which 38.6% had children under the age of 18 living with them, 58.6% were married couples living together, 10.7% had a female householder with no husband present, and 27.9% were non-families. 20.7% of all households were made up of individuals, and 9.3% had someone living alone who was 65 years of age or older. The average household size was 2.82 and the average family size was 3.37.

In the town, the age distribution of the population shows 30.4% under the age of 18, 10.4% from 18 to 24, 28.1% from 25 to 44, 21.8% from 45 to 64, and 9.4% who were 65 years of age or older. The median age was 35 years. For every 100 females, there were 91.7 males. For every 100 females age 18 and over, there were 97.8 males.

The median income for a household in the town was $44,375, and the median income for a family was $46,875. Males had a median income of $38,250 versus $31,458 for females. The per capita income for the town was $17,481. About 2.0% of families and 4.0% of the population were below the poverty line, including none of those under age 18 and 18.2% of those age 65 or over.

== Arts and culture ==
=== Events ===
Wilkeson hosts the National Handcar Races annually on the third Saturday in July.

=== Historic buildings and sites ===
The town is home to the Holy Trinity Orthodox Church, the oldest Orthodox church in Washington state, and the Wilkeson School, a schoolhouse built in 1909 and listed on the National Register of Historic Places.

The Carlson Block dates from 1910.

There are several existing relics from Wilkeson's mining past, including bee hive coke ovens, a gated mine shaft on Wilkeson Creek and an abandoned concrete coal works. The 30 remaining coke ovens from the town's early involvement in the coal industry are listed on the National Register of Historic Places.
