= Paradise Ice Caves =

Glacier caves in Washington, United States

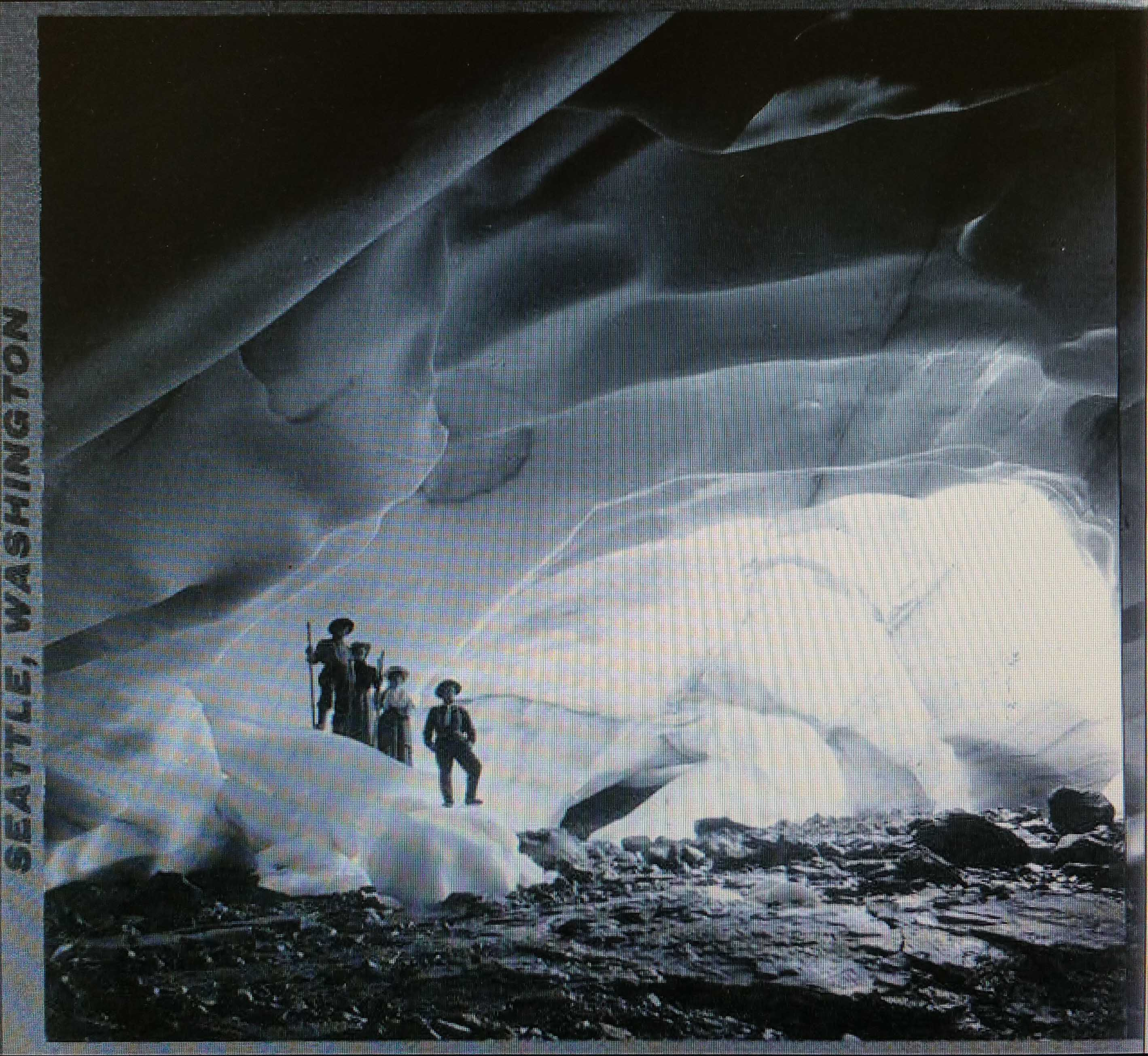
Paradise Ice Caves

The Paradise Ice Caves (also known as the Paradise Glacier Caves) were a system of interconnected glacier caves located within Mount Rainier's Paradise Glacier in the United States. These glacier caves were visited and documented at least as early as 1908. They have a varied natural history, as their size and even existence has changed over time, from a maximum surveyed length of 13.25 kilometers in 1978, to not existing at all during both the 1940s and 1990s due to glacial recession. In 1978 they were the longest mapped system of glacier caves in the world.
