= Paradise Glacier =

Glacier on Mount Rainier, Washington, United States

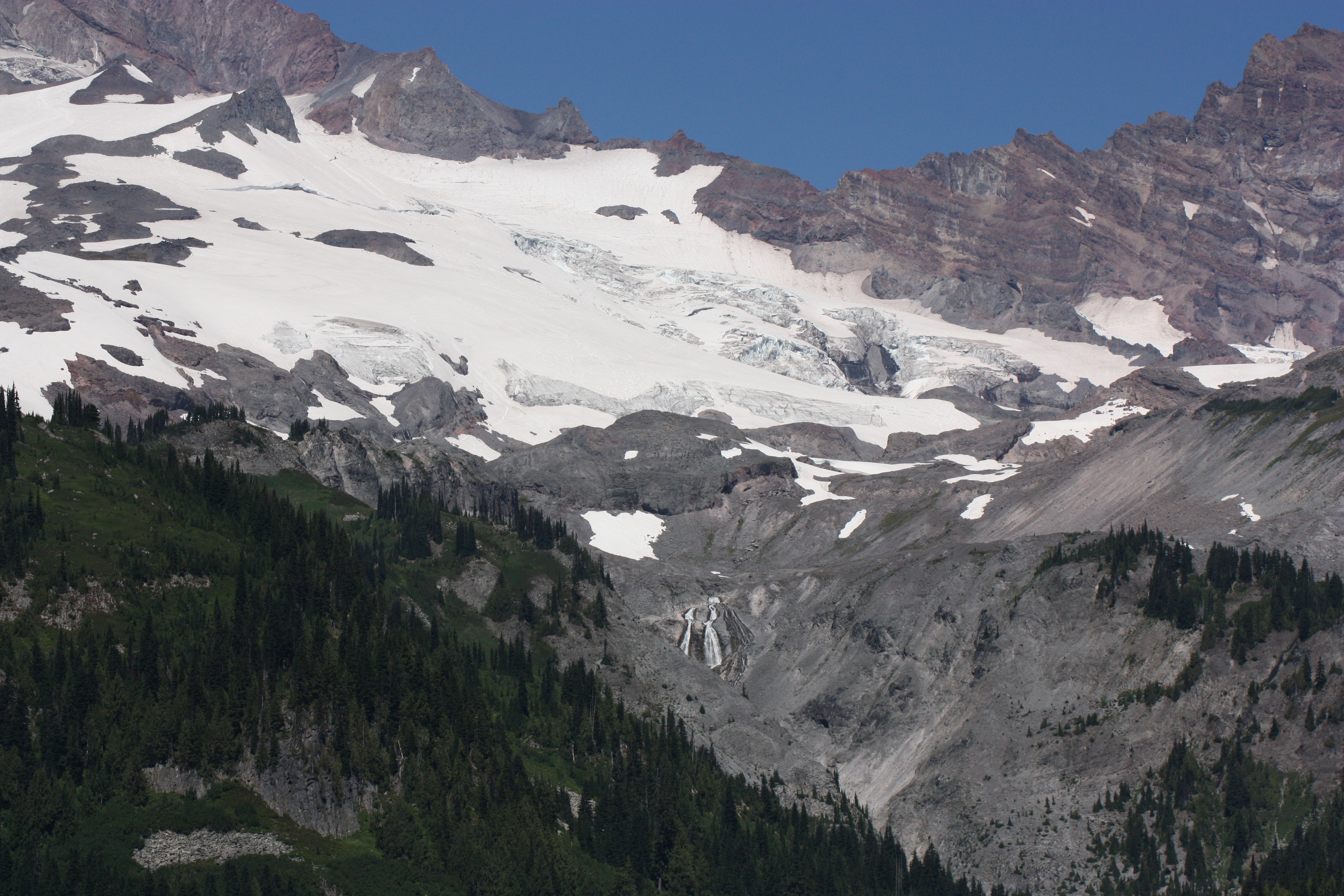
- Paradise Glacier, viewed from the south
- Interactive map of Paradise Glacier
- Type: Mountain glacier
- Location: Mount Rainier, Pierce County, Washington, USA
- Coordinates: 46°49′03″N 121°42′51″W
- Area: 0.4 square miles (1.0 km^{2}), 1983 including Stevens Glacier

Paradise Glacier is a glacier on the southeast flank of Mount Rainier in Washington. It covers 0.4 square miles (1.0 km^{2}) and contains 0.8 billion ft^{3} (23 million m^{3}) with Stevens Glacier included. The glacier is bounded to the west by the Muir Snowfield, Anvil Rock and McClure Rock.

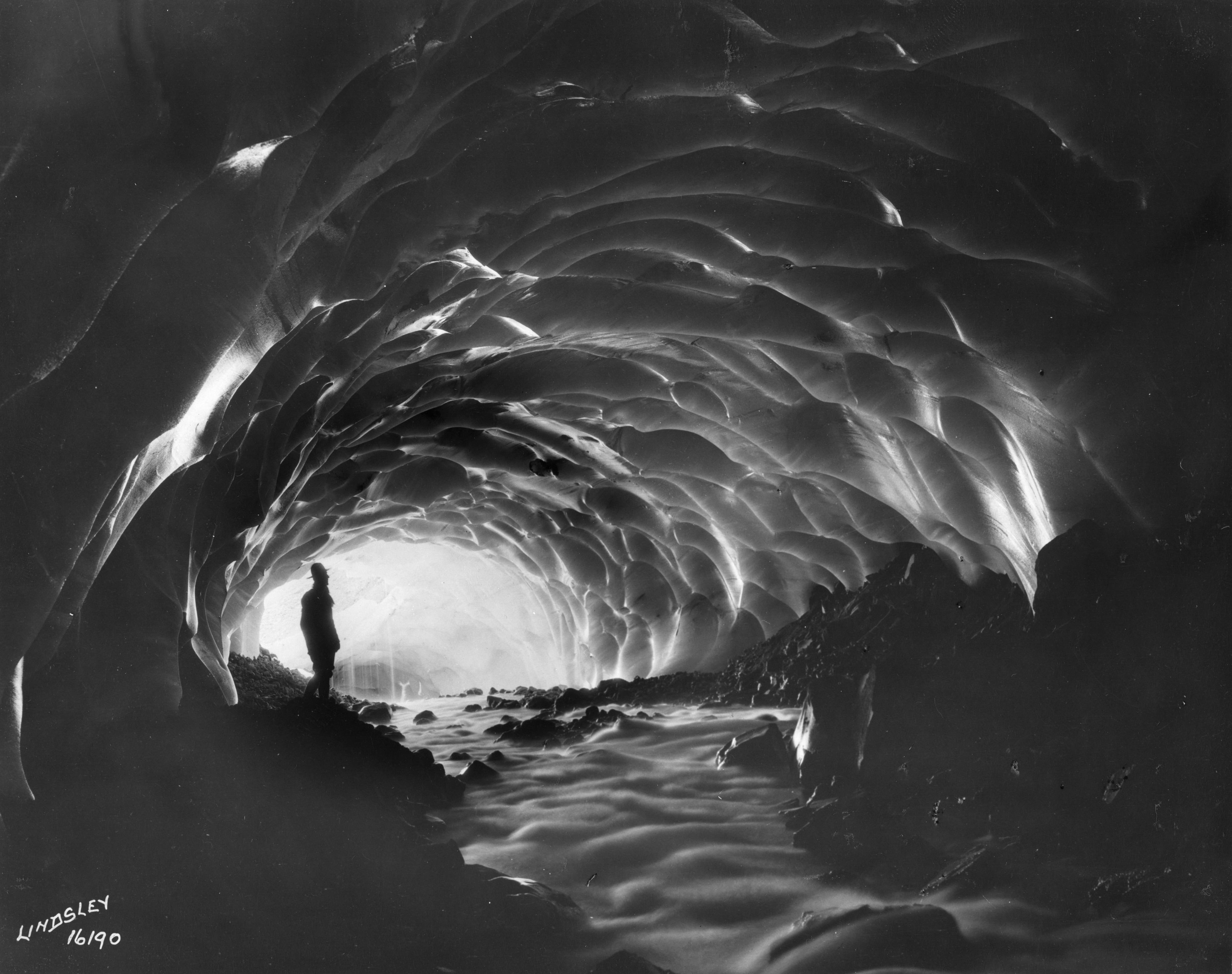
Exploring Paradise Glacier, October 1923

There is a single extant main lobe of the glacier, ranging from 9,000 feet (2,700 m) to 7,200 feet (2,200 m), that is connected to the larger Cowlitz Glacier. To the south, there was a smaller portion which was near the Cowlitz Rocks and the tiny Williwakas Glacier, ranging from 6,900 feet (2,100 m) to 6,400 ft (2,000 m) in elevation and containing the Paradise Ice Caves until the 1990s. This smaller lobe melted between 2004 and 2006. Meltwater from the glacier drains into the Cowlitz River.

== Glacier loss ==
The Williwakas was declared a dead glacier in the 1930s and the ice caves were lost in the 1980s. In a June 2023 report from the National Park Service (NPS), the Stevens Glacier was removed from the NPS glacier list for lack of ice flow and size.

== See also ==
- List of glaciers
