= Edward Sturgis Ingraham =

American school superintendent and mountaineer

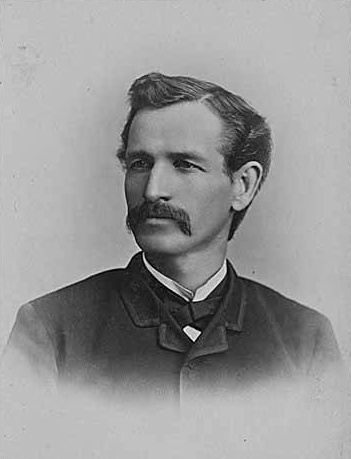
Edward Sturgis Ingraham.

Edward Sturgis Ingraham (April 8, 1852 – August 16, 1926) was the first superintendent of the Seattle Public Schools, a noted mountaineer who climbed to the summit of Mount Rainier 13 times, and a leader in the effort to establish Mount Rainier National Park. Seattle's Ingraham High School is named in his honor, as is the Ingraham Glacier on Mount Rainier.

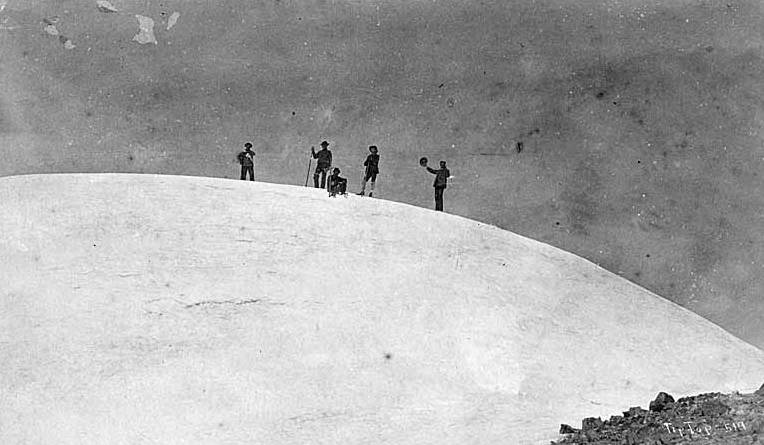
Climbing party at summit of Mount Rainier, 1888. Left to right: D.W. Bass, P.B. Van Trump, John Muir, N.O. Booth, E.S. Ingraham.

== Early life ==
Ingraham was born in Albion, Maine. His parents, Samuel and Almira, were natives of the same state, their ancestors being numbered among the earliest settlers of New England. Samuel Ingraham was a master mariner, whose service was chiefly in packet ships which sailed from the Kennebec River and conducted a general passenger and freight business along the coast to the West Indies. E. S. Ingraham, when a boy, attended the public schools of Maine until his fifteenth year, and then entered the Free Press office at Rockland and learned the printer's trade.

With an increasing fondness for a literary life and a higher education, he entered the Eastern Maine State Normal School, and graduated that institution in 1871. According to the laws of Maine relating to normal school graduates, Ingraham then began teaching in the public schools, and at the same time pursued a classical course of study through the Waterville Classical Institute, which he followed for three years until his eyes failed and he had to end his studies.

== Educational work in Seattle ==
In August, 1875, he came to Seattle, where his half-brother, Andrew Ingraham (who emigrated west in 1849), then resided. Ten days after arriving, E. S. Ingraham was offered the position of principal of the central school and to assume charge of the schools of the city, which then numbered three buildings, six teachers and about 200 pupils. He continued as principal of the dental school for thirteen years, and saw the number of teachers of the city schools increase to twenty-nine and the average attendance to 1,700 pupils. Ingraham was elected by the Republican party as Superintendent of King County Schools in 1876, and re-elected, in 1878 and 1880, serving six years continuously. In 1883, he was appointed Superintendent of Seattle Public Schools, and held the office five years.

After the admission of Washington to statehood, Ingraham was a member of the first State Board of Education, by appointment of Governor Elisha P. Ferry. He materially advanced the educational interests of Washington, was actively connected with state institute work, and was among the first to advocate county institutes by organizing one in King County.

== Mountaineering ==
Ingraham first climbed Mt. Rainier in summer, 1886, using an approach from the northeast, however his party failed to summit on that attempt. He made a second attempt from the northeast in 1887, but only reached the 13,800 foot elevation. In 1888, Ingraham joined the party accompanying John Muir to the summit of Mount Rainier. They reached the top of mountain on August 14, 1888. This expedition was notable in two aspects: it inspired Muir to write about Mt. Rainier for the wider public, and Arthur Churchill Warner, a photographer accompanying them, took the first photographs from the summit. Muir describes this climb in a chapter of his book Steep Trails.

In the summer of 1894, Ingraham led a large party from Seattle. This was the largest party to summit Mt. Rainier at the time, consisting of 14, including three women. On this ascent, using a aneroid barometer, he determined the elevation of the summit to be 15,500 feet, an inaccurate measurement as he failed to account for weather conditions. The party agreed to name the summit Columbia Crest.

On behalf of the Seattle Post-Intelligencer, Ingraham led a party to investigate concerns of an eruption on Mt. Rainier in December, 1894 after numerous observers reported smoke from the crater. (Note: No evidence was found of eruptive activity.)

Ingraham led another successful ascent of Mt. Rainier in August, 1889.

In 1897, Ingraham joined the party of Prince Luigi Amedeo, Duke of the Abruzzi in summiting Mount St. Elias in Alaska.

== Printing and politics ==
In 1888 he retired from educational work and shortly thereafter entered into partnership with UK Coryell and established the printing house of Ingraham & Coryell. They published the Northwest Journal of Education and the Seattle Guide, a monthly publication of general information connected with the city, besides conducting a general job-printing business. Ingraham was a member of the Board of Aldermen for the city of Seattle, serving one term, and in March, 1893, he was appointed by Governor John H. McGraw to the position of Regent of the State Agricultural College and School of Science for a term of four years.

== Later life ==
Ingraham was a member of the Home Guard militia during the Seattle riot of 1886. Ingraham served in the Washington National Guard for more than five years, retiring in April, 1897, as a lieutenant colonel, although he was generally called Major Ingraham by the public.

In 1898, Ingraham organized a party of 15 men to travel to Kotzebue, Alaska in search of gold on behalf of Prince Luigi. Three days into their voyage on the schooner Jane Gray, the ship foundered in inclement weather about 90 miles west of Cape Flattery. Most of Ingraham's party died.

Ingraham's obituary calls him the father of the Boy Scout movement in Washington and notes that he was an active Free Mason.

== Family ==
Ingraham was married in Seattle, in April, 1888, to Myra Ada Carr, a native of Oregon, whose parents were pioneers in the early 1860s. They had two sons, Norman and Kenneth Carr Ingraham.
