= Williwakas Glacier =

Glacier on Mount Rainier, Washington, U.S.

- Interactive map of Williwakas Glacier
- Type: Mountain glacier
- Location: Mount Rainier, Pierce County, Washington, USA
- Coordinates: 46°48′35″N 121°42′22″W

The Williwakas Glacier was a glacier located on the south flank of Mount Rainier in Washington. The glacier lies below the Paradise Glacier. Due to its relatively low elevation—6,600 feet (2,000 m)–6,900 feet (2,100 m)—the glacier is small and surrounded by small snow fields above the regional tree line. A stubby 7,163 ft (2,183 m) peak is located to the east of the glacier.

The Williwakas Glacier has been characterized as dead since prior to the end of the 20th century.

== See also ==
- List of glaciers
