= Ingraham Glacier =

Glacier in Washington, United States

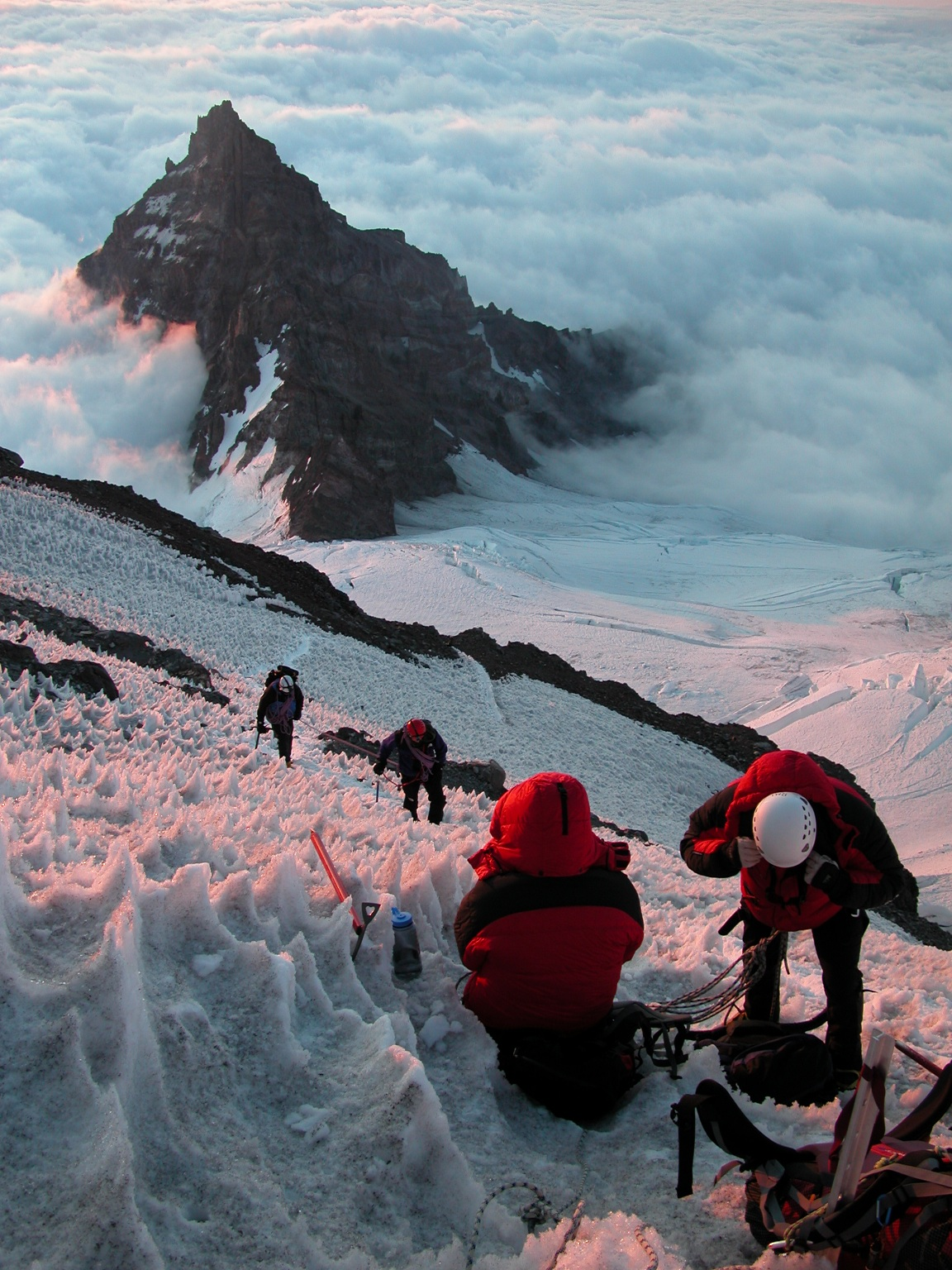
- Climbing Ingraham Glacier, Little Tahoma Peak below

- Location within Washington (state)
- Type: Mountain glacier
- Location: Mount Rainier, Pierce County, Washington, USA
- Coordinates: 46°50′18″N 121°42′43″W
- Length: 2.6 mi (4.2 km)
- Terminus: Icefall
- Status: Retreating

Ingraham Glacier is on the south-eastern flank of Mount Rainier, in the U.S. state of Washington. The glacier is named for the Mount Rainier enthusiast Edward Sturgis Ingraham. From the summit ice cap, Ingraham Glacier flows east between Gibraltar Rock, (12,660 ft (3,860 m)), and Disappointment Cleaver and south of Little Tahoma Peak (11,138 ft (3,395 m)), which divides it from the much larger Emmons Glacier to the north. Descending southeast, it approaches the east flank of Cowlitz Glacier and the two glaciers nearly join at 6,700 ft (2,000 m). Meltwater from the glacier drains into the Cowlitz River.

== History ==
About 35,000 years ago, the Ingraham and Cowlitz glaciers flowed 62 mi (100 km) down from Mount Rainier to near present-day Mossyrock, Washington. More recently, the Cowlitz - Ingraham glaciers advanced slightly from the mid-1970s to mid-1980s, but have been in a general state of retreat since the end of the Little Ice Age around the year 1850. During the Little Ice Age, the Ingraham and Cowlitz glaciers were combined and terminated at the 5,600-foot (1,700 m) level but have retreated more than 1 mi (1.6 km) in the last 150 years.

The worst mountaineering accident in American history occurred on June 21, 1981, when eleven people died in an ice fall on the Ingraham Glacier. None of the bodies were ever recovered.

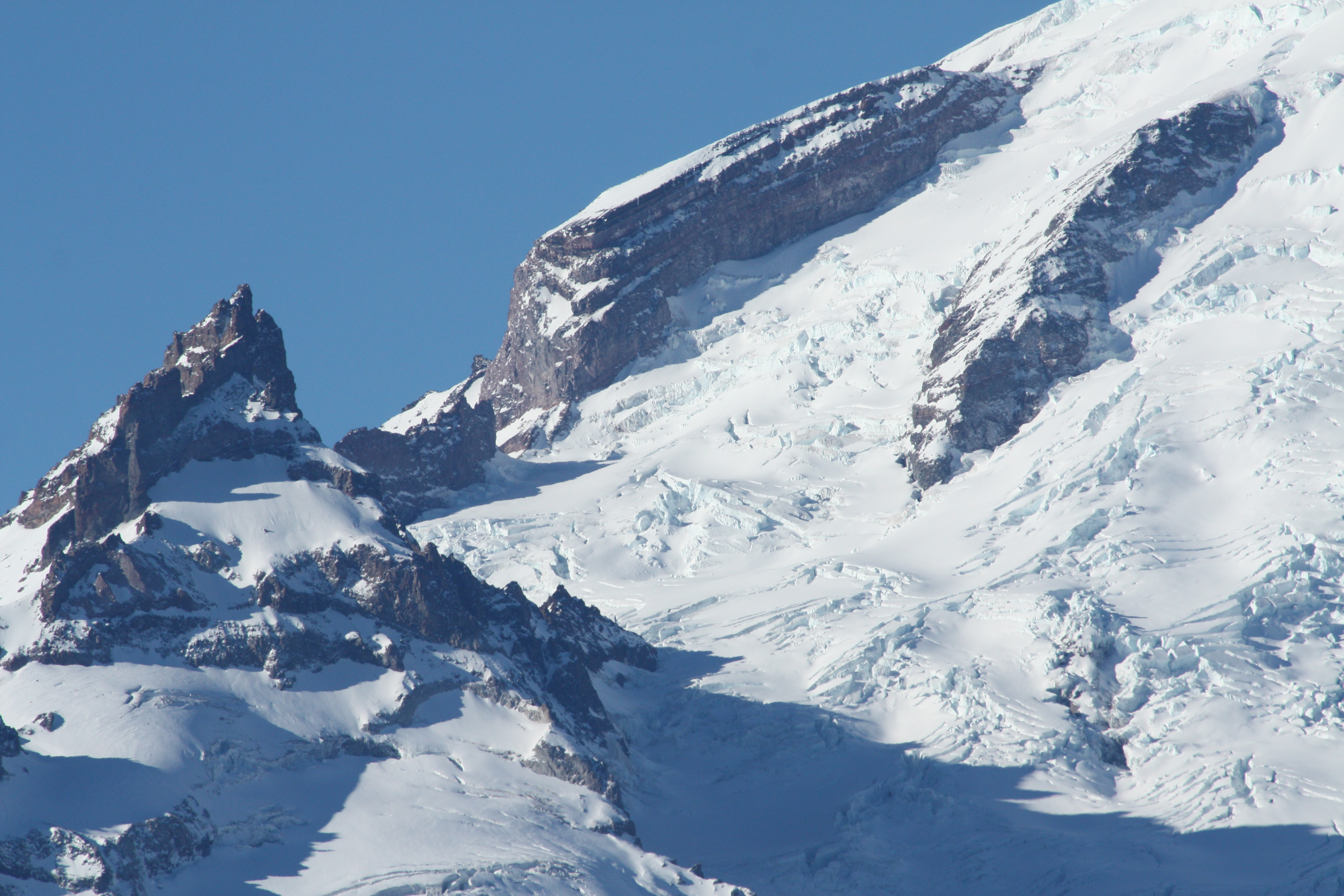
Ingraham Glacier flows between Gibraltar Rock (center skyline) and Disappointment Cleaver (upper right) and descends behind sharp pointed Little Tahoma (left)

== See also ==
- List of glaciers in the United States
