= Carbon Glacier =

Glacier in the United States

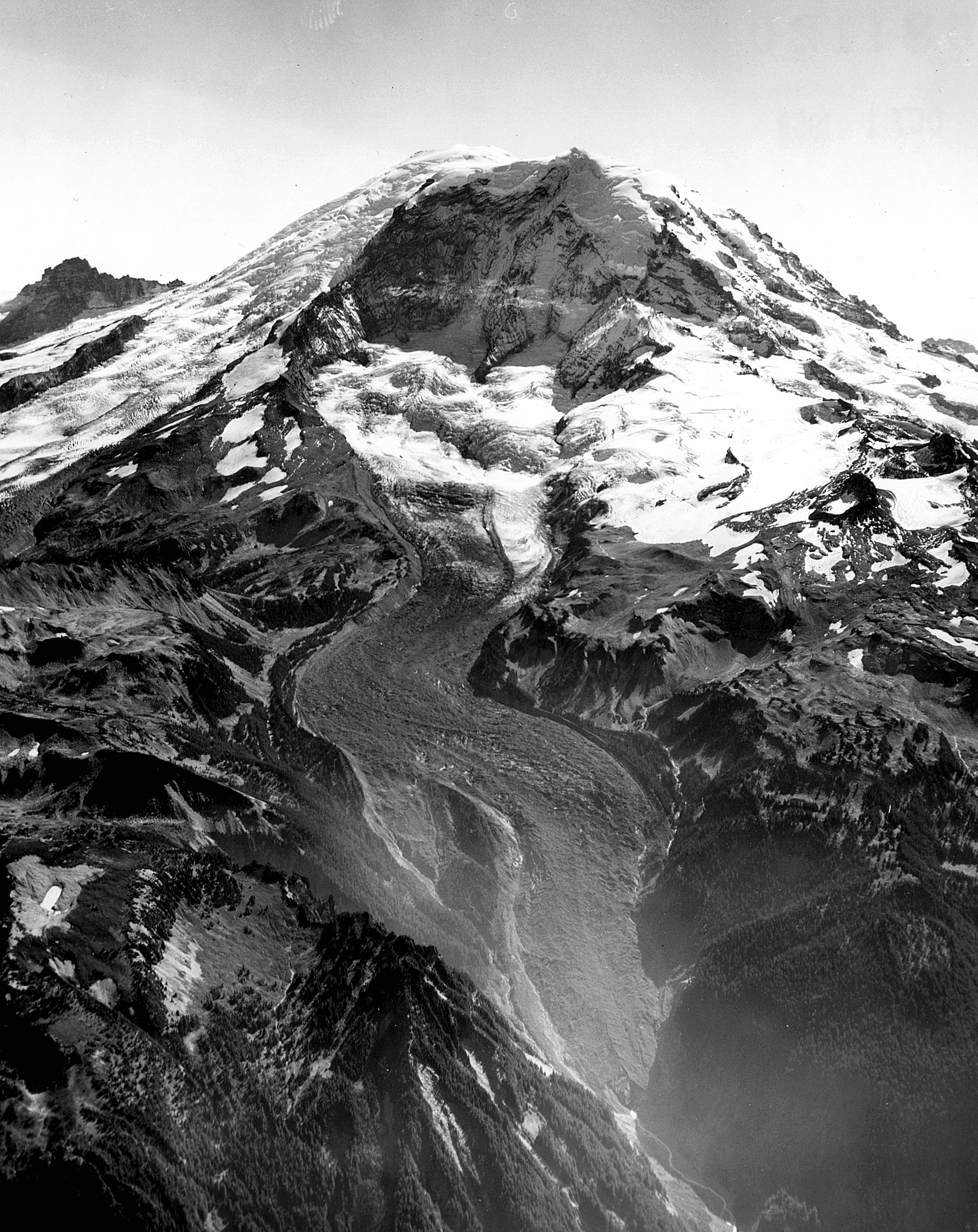
- The accumulation zone of the Carbon Glacier is fed from avalanches off Willis Wall (behind).

- Location within Washington (state)
- Type: Mountain glacier
- Location: Mount Rainier National Park, Pierce County, Washington, USA
- Coordinates: 46°56′30″N 121°46′30″W
- Area: 3.1 sq mi (8.0 km^{2})
- Length: 5.7 mi (9.2 km)
- Thickness: 700 ft (210 m)
- Terminus: Moraine
- Status: Retreating

Carbon Glacier is located on the north slope of Mount Rainier in the U.S. state of Washington and is the source of the Carbon River. The snout at the glacier terminal moraine is at about 3,500 feet (1,100 m) above sea level, making it the lowest-elevation glacier in the contiguous United States. The glacier also has the greatest length (5.7 miles (9.2 km)), thickness (700 ft (210 m)) and volume (0.2 cubic miles (0.83 km^{3})) of any U.S. glacier outside of Alaska.

At over a mile wide, the Carbon Glacier cirque is the largest in the Cascade Mountains. The headwall of the cirque is the prominent Willis Wall landform.

Carbon Glacier is currently only accessible by hiking the Wonderland Trail from Nisqually, Longmire, or Paradise, as the Mowich Lake entrance to the northwest is closed due to the Carbon-Fairfax bridge closure. There is currently no estimated date of replacement for the bridge.

== See also ==
- List of glaciers in the United States
