= Willis Wall =

Cliff in Pierce County, Washington, USA

Coordinates: 46.8703855°N 121.7589858°W

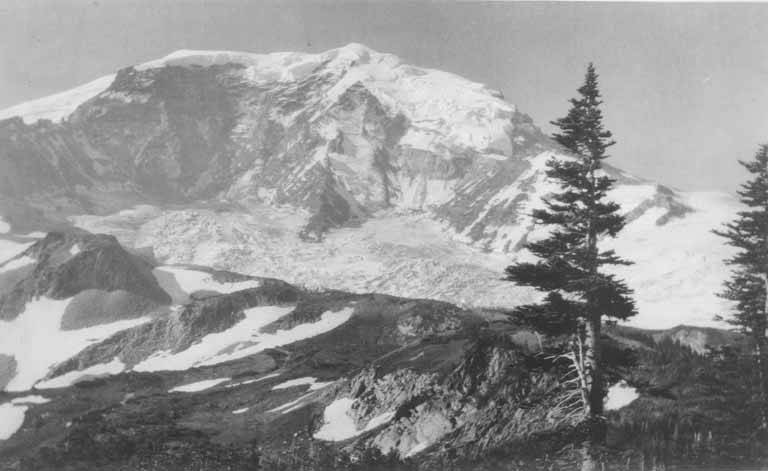
Image of Mount Rainier's Willis Wall, taken around 1912 or 1913

Willis Wall is the name given to the prominent headwall of the Carbon Glacier's eastern cirque on Mount Rainier in the state of Washington. The 3,600 feet (1,097 m) foot wall of volcanic rock on Mount Rainier's north face was named in honor of geological engineer Bailey Willis, who helped create the first trail to the Carbon Glacier in 1881 and was also influential in securing the passage of the bill that created Mount Rainier National Park in 1899. At over a mile wide, the Carbon Glacier cirque is the largest in the Cascade Mountains. The wall itself is composed of ledges of lava, ash, consolidated breccias, and rock-impregnated ice.

== Climbing history ==
The Willis Wall is crowned by a 200 to 300-foot wall of ice, prone to large ice falls and whose instability deterred many early climbers from attempting to scale it. Credit for the first climb up the Willis Wall is now given to the June 1961 ascent by Charles Bell who climbed the wall's West Rib. Bell's claim was initially met with great skepticism, as it was a solo climb with no photographic evidence to back up his assertion. To counter this criticism, Bell made another climb the following year, though this time traversing from Mount Rainier's Liberty Ridge, and returned with photographs taken from the Willis Wall. The prominent American climber Jim Wickwire, who climbed the Willis Wall via the Eastern Rib in 1963 and made the first winter ascent of Willis Wall in 1970, corresponded with Bell, and analyzed photographs taken during his climbs with those of Bell as well as Bell's notes. Wickwire and climber Dee Molenaar eventually concluded that Bell's claim was valid and credited him with the first Willis Wall ascent.

In a 2022 talk, Wickwire noted that there had been no fatalities climbing the Willis Wall to date, which he attributed to the considerable care taken by the few climbers brave enough to attempt it.

== Notable ascents ==
- 1961: Charles Bell, solo ascent of the West Rib to the ice cliff
- 1962: Ed Cooper, Mike Swayne via the eastern edge of Willis Wall
- 1963: Don Anderson, Fred Dunham, Dave Mahre, Jim Wickwire: East Rib through the central ice cliff (the first direct ascent up Willis Wall including the ice cliff)
- 1965: Dean Caldwell, Paul Dix: Central Rib and the central ice cliff
- 1970 First winter ascent: Jim Wickwire, Alex Bertulis (West Rib)

== See also ==
- El Capitan, granite headwall in Yosemite
