= Cowlitz Glacier =

Glacier in the United States

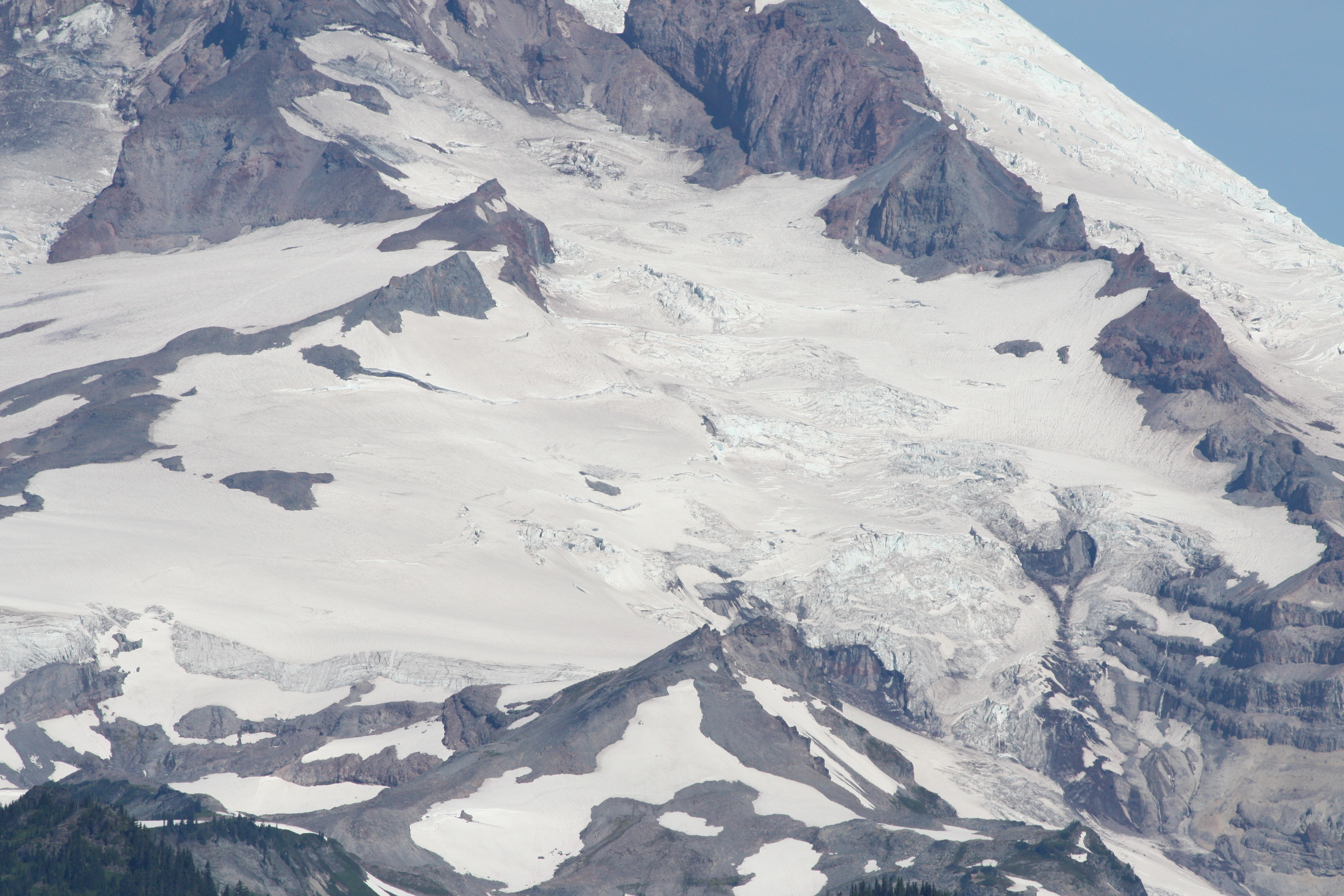
- Upper Cowlitz Glacier (right center)

- Location within Washington (state)
- Type: Mountain glacier
- Location: Mount Rainier National Park, Pierce County, Washington, USA
- Coordinates: 46°49′50″N 121°43′02″W
- Area: 1.3 sq mi (3.4 km^{2})
- Status: Retreating

The Cowlitz Glacier is a glacier on the southeast flank of Mount Rainier in the U.S. state of Washington. The body of ice covers 1.3 square miles (3.4 km^{2}) and has a volume of 6 billion ft^{3} (170 million m^{3}). The glacier starts at an elevation of 10,700 feet (3,300 m) and flows southeast. An adjacent glacier, the Paradise Glacier, is connected to this glacier on its southwest margin. As it flows down the slopes of Mount Rainier it nearly meets up with the Ingraham Glacier and during the Little Ice Age, which ended around the year 1850, the two glaciers shared a common terminus. Meltwater from the glacier drains into the Cowlitz River.

== History ==
About 35,000 years ago, the combined Cowlitz and Ingraham glaciers terminated some 62 mi (100 km) from Mount Rainier. As the Ice Age ended the glacier retreated north back to Mount Rainier. In recent times, the glacier has retreated and thinned, except for the period between the mid-1970s and mid-1980s, during which the glacier made a notable advance.

== See also ==
- List of glaciers in the United States
