= Mount Rainier =

Stratovolcano in the U.S. state of Washington

- Tahoma
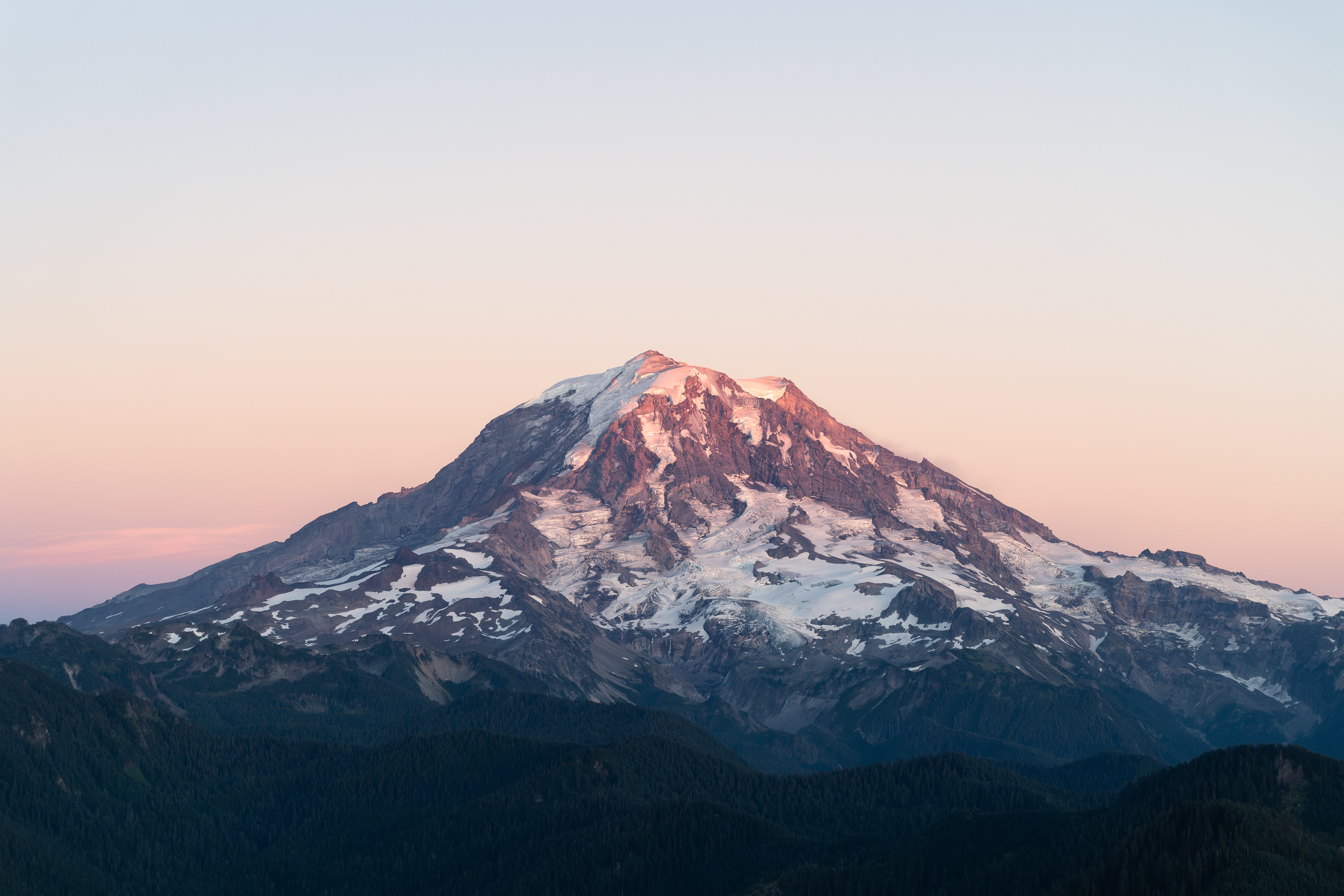
- Mount Rainier's northwestern slope viewed aerially just before sunset on September 6, 2020

Highest point
- Elevation: 14,406 feet (4,391 m) (2025, NAVD88)
- Prominence: 13,210 ft (4,030 m)
- Isolation: 731 mi (1,176 km)
- Listing: World most prominent peaks 21st; North America prominent peaks 4th; North America isolated peaks 7th; U.S. highest major peaks 17th; U.S. state high point 4th; Decade Volcano
- Coordinates: 46°51′06″N 121°45′37″W

Naming
- Etymology: Peter Rainier
- Native name: təqʷubəʔ; xʷaq̓ʷ (Lushootseed); təx̣ʷúma; təqʷúmen (Cowlitz); Tax̱úma (Yakama)

Geography
- Location within Washington (state)
- Country: United States
- State: Washington
- County: Pierce County
- Protected area: Mount Rainier National Park
- Parent range: Cascade Range
- Topo map: USGS Mount Rainier West

Geology
- Formed by: Subduction zone volcanism
- Rock age: 500,000 years
- Mountain type: Stratovolcano
- Volcanic arc: Cascade Volcanic Arc
- Last eruption: 1450

Climbing
- First ascent: 1870 by Hazard Stevens and P. B. Van Trump
- Easiest route: rock/ice climb via Disappointment Cleaver

Mount Rainier (/reɪˈnɪər/ ray-NEER), also known as Tahoma (/təˈhoʊmə/ tə-HOH-mə), (Note: Indigenous peoples around the mountain have names for it in their languages: Lushootseed: təqʷubəʔ and xʷaq̓ʷ; Cowlitz: təx̣ʷúma and təqʷúmen; Yakama: Tax̱úma) is a large, active stratovolcano in the Cascade Range of the Pacific Northwest in the United States. The mountain is located in Mount Rainier National Park about 59 miles (95 km) south-southeast of Seattle. At 14,406 ft (Note: Before 2014, Mount Rainier's icecap at the Columbia Crest was the highest point on the mountain, and was surveyed at 14,410 feet (4,390 m) in 1956. Due to climate change, the Columbia Crest has melted down to a height of 14,394.6 feet (4,387.5 m), while Mount Rainier's Southwest Rim was measured at 14,406.3 feet (4,391.0 m), which would make it the new highest point on the volcano.) (4,391 m) it is the highest mountain in the U.S. state of Washington, the most topographically prominent mountain in the contiguous United States, and the tallest in the Cascade Volcanic Arc.

Due to its high probability of an eruption in the near future and proximity to a major urban area, Mount Rainier is considered one of the most dangerous volcanoes in the world, and it is on the Decade Volcano list. The large amount of glacial ice means that Mount Rainier could produce massive lahars that could threaten the entire Puyallup River valley and other river valleys draining Mount Rainier, including the Carbon, White, Nisqually, and Cowlitz (above Riffe Lake). According to the United States Geological Survey's 2008 report, "about 80,000 people and their homes are at risk in Mount Rainier's lahar-hazard zones."

Between 1950 and 2022, 471,792 people attempted to climb Mount Rainier according to NPS statistics. Approximately 84 people died in mountaineering accidents on Mount Rainier from 1947 to 2018.

== Name ==
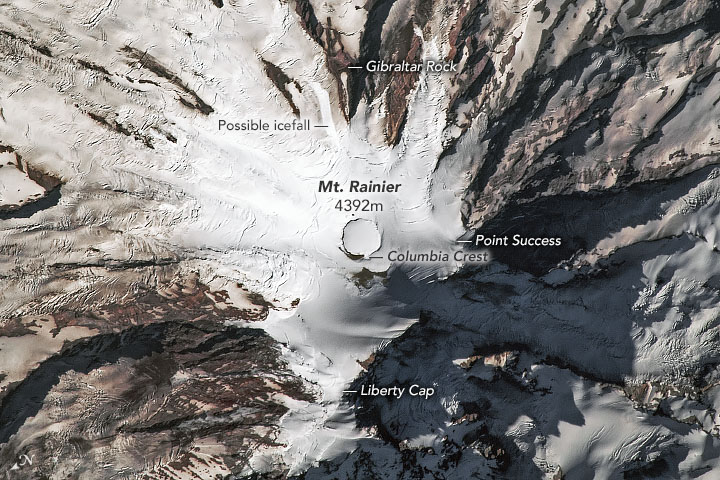
Mount Rainier seen from the International Space Station

The many Indigenous peoples who have lived near Mount Rainier for millennia have many names for the mountain in their various languages. A linguistic analysis published in 2025 identified 20 indigenous names for the mountain.

Lushootseed speakers have several names for Mount Rainier, including xʷaq̓ʷ and təqʷubəʔ. xʷaq̓ʷ means "sky wiper" or "one who touches the sky" in English. The word təqʷubəʔ means "snow-covered mountain". təqʷubəʔ has been anglicized in many ways, including "Tacoma" and "Tacobet".

Cowlitz speakers call the mountain təx̣ʷúma or təqʷúmen. Sahaptin speakers call the mountain Tax̱úma, which is borrowed from Cowlitz.

Another anglicized name is Pooskaus.

George Vancouver named Mount Rainier in honor of his friend, Rear Admiral Peter Rainier. The map of the Lewis and Clark expedition of 1804–1806 refers to it as "Mt. Regniere". Although Rainier had been considered the official name of the mountain, Theodore Winthrop referred to the mountain as "Tacoma" in his posthumously published 1862 travel book The Canoe and the Saddle. For a time, both names were used interchangeably, although residents of the nearby city of Tacoma preferred Mount Tacoma.

In 1890, the United States Board on Geographic Names declared that the mountain would be known as Rainier. Following this in 1897, the Pacific Forest Reserve became the Mount Rainier Forest Reserve, and the national park was established three years later. Despite this, there was still a movement to change the mountain's name to Tacoma, and Congress was considering a resolution to change the name as late as 1924.

== Geographical setting ==
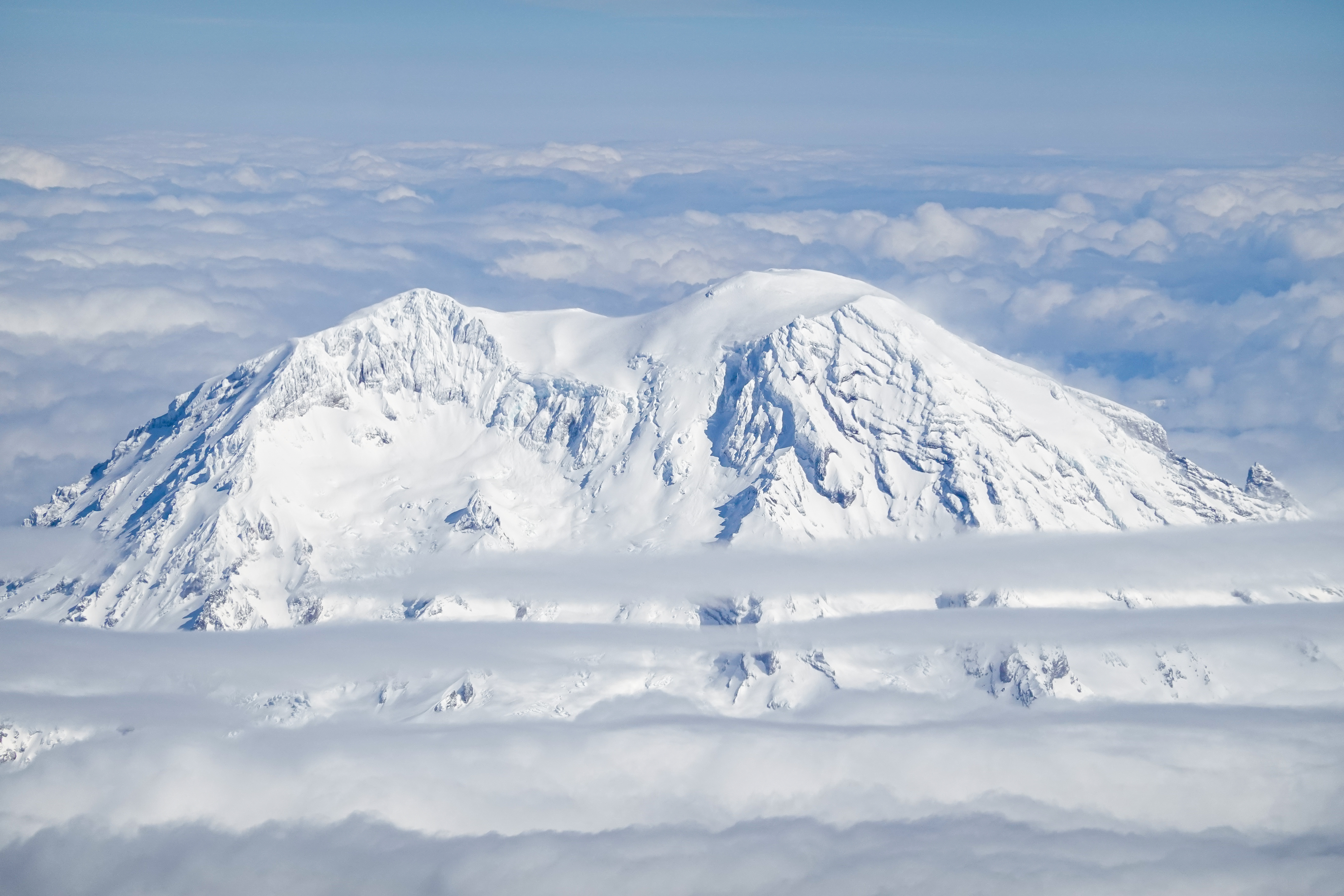
West face of Mount Rainier from an aircraft

Mount Rainier is the tallest mountain in Washington and the Cascade Range. This peak is located southeast of Tacoma, approximately 60 miles (97 km) south-southeast of Seattle. Mount Rainier has a topographic prominence of 13,210 ft (4,026 m). On clear days it dominates the southeastern horizon in most of the Seattle-Tacoma metropolitan area to such an extent that locals sometimes refer to it simply as "the Mountain". On days of exceptional clarity, it can also be seen from as far away as Corvallis, Oregon (at Marys Peak), and the North Shore Mountains in British Columbia.

With 26 major glaciers and 36 sq mi (93 km^{2}) of permanent snowfields and glaciers, Mount Rainier is the most heavily glaciated peak in the lower 48 states. The summit is topped by two volcanic craters, each more than 1,000 ft (300 m) in diameter, with the larger east crater overlapping the west crater. Geothermal heat from the volcano keeps areas of both crater rims free of snow and ice, and the world's largest volcanic glacier cave network has formed within the ice-filled craters, with nearly 2 mi (3.2 km) of passages. A small crater lake about 130 by 30 ft (39.6 by 9.1 m) in size and 16 ft (5 m) deep, the highest in North America with a surface elevation of 14,203 ft (4,329 m), occupies the lowest portion of the west crater below more than 100 ft (30 m) of ice and is accessible only via the caves.

The Carbon, Cowlitz, Nisqually, Puyallup and North Mowich Rivers begin at eponymous glaciers of Mount Rainier. The sources of the White River are Winthrop, Emmons, and Fryingpan Glaciers. The White, Carbon, and Mowich join the Puyallup River, which discharges into Commencement Bay at Tacoma. The Nisqually empties into Puget Sound east of Lacey. The Cowlitz joins the Columbia River between Kelso and Longview.

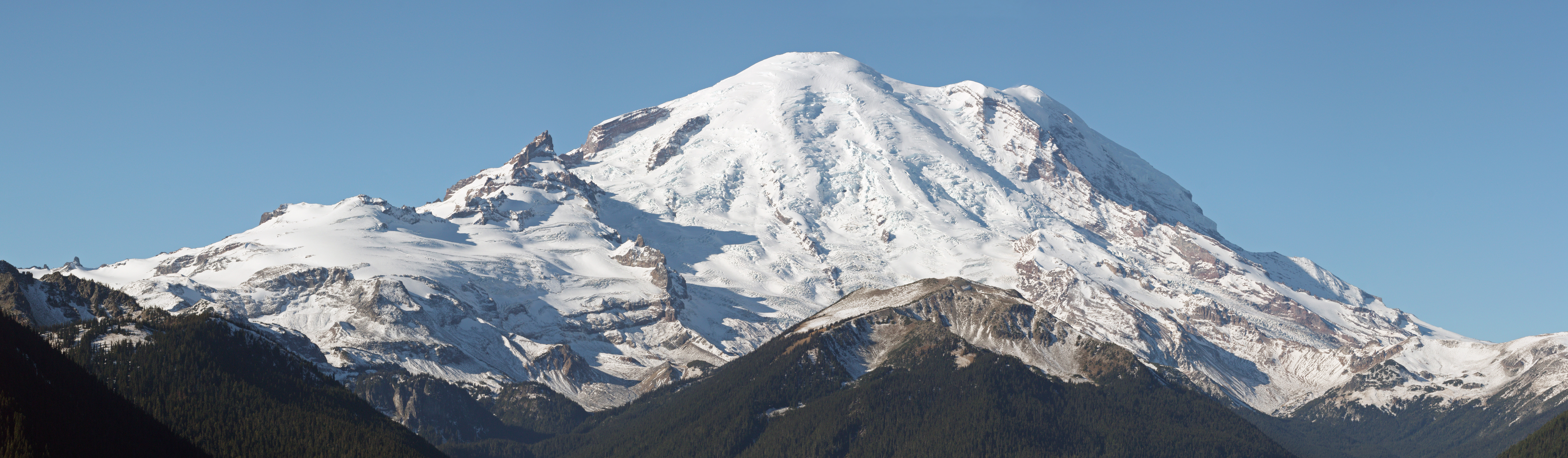
A panorama of the northeast face of Mount Rainier

=== Subsidiary peaks ===
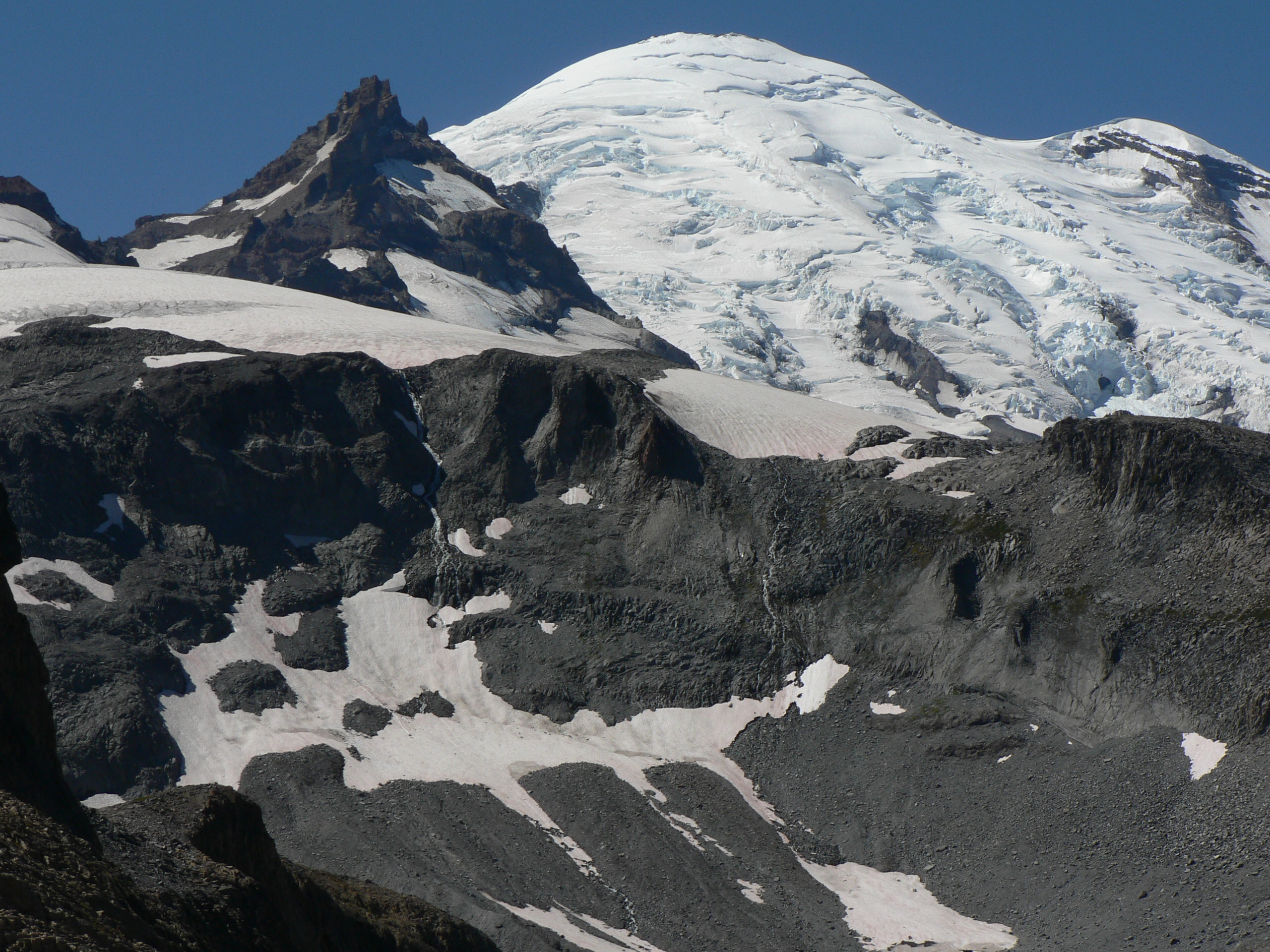
Little Tahoma Peak to the left of Mount Rainier, from Panhandle Gap

The broad top of Mount Rainier contains three named summits. The highest of these named summits is known as the Columbia Crest. The second-highest summit is Point Success, 14,158 ft (4,315 m), at the southern edge of the summit plateau, atop the ridge known as Success Cleaver. It has a topographic prominence of about 138 ft (42 m), so it is not considered a separate peak. The lowest of the three summits is Liberty Cap, 14,112 ft (4,301 m), at the northwestern edge, which overlooks Liberty Ridge, the Sunset Amphitheater, and the dramatic Willis Wall.

High on the eastern flank of Mount Rainier is a peak known as Little Tahoma Peak, 11,138 ft (3,395 m), an eroded remnant of the earlier, much higher, Mount Rainier. It has a prominence of 858 ft (262 m), and it is rarely climbed in direct conjunction with Columbia Crest, so it is usually considered a separate peak. If considered separately from Mount Rainier, Little Tahoma Peak would be the third-highest mountain peak in Washington.

=== Height of the mountain ===
Mount Rainier was one of five historical icecap summits in the lower 48 states, meaning that its elevation has changed as a result of glacial melting due to climate change. The National Park Service and United States Geological Survey cite Mount Rainier's summit as the Columbia Crest icecap at 14,410 ft (4,392 m); this value was determined in 1956, referenced to the National Geodetic Vertical Datum of 1929 (NGVD29). In 1999, the mountain summit was surveyed at 14,411 ft (4,392 m), also in the NGVD29. (Note: The 1999 survey was based on the North American Vertical Datum of 1988, but the result was converted to NGVD29 by the original authors for comparison to previous values.)

In the 2020s, Eric Gilbertson and other surveyors found that the Columbia Crest had melted down so that it was no longer the highest point on the mountain after around 2014. According to Gilbertson's research, the current summit of the mountain is a point of bare rock on the southwest crater rim at 14,399.6 feet (4,389.0 m) +/- 3 cm (1.2 in). This figure also uses the NGVD29 datum. Mount Rainier National Park geologists expressed concerns over the methods used in the study and requested the data for evaluation, though they recorded similar glacial thinning. An official measurement taken in 2010 saw little to no change from the official value.

== Geology ==
Hazard map of Mount Rainier Lava flows and pyroclastic flows Electron Mudflow-sized event (generally large in size) National Lahar-sized event (generally moderate in size) Lahars not necessarily associated with volcanism (generally small) Flooding after lahar event Potential area of inundation from failure of the Alder Dam County boundary Mount Rainier National Park boundary City

Mount Rainier is a stratovolcano in the Cascade Volcanic Arc that consists of lava flows, debris flows, and pyroclastic ejecta and flows. Its early volcanic deposits are estimated at more than 840,000 years old and are part of the Lily Formation (about 2.9 million to 840,000 years ago). The early deposits formed a "proto-Rainier" or an ancestral cone before the present-day cone. The present cone is more than 500,000 years old.

The volcano is highly eroded, with glaciers on its slopes, and appears to be made mostly of andesite. Rainier likely once stood even higher than today at about 16,000 ft (4,900 m) before a major debris avalanche and the resulting Osceola Mudflow approximately 5,000 years ago. In the past, Rainier has had large debris avalanches and enormous lahars (volcanic mudflows), due to the large amount of glacial ice present. Its lahars have reached all the way to Puget Sound, a distance of more than 30 mi (48 km). Around 5,000 years ago, a large chunk of the volcano slid away, and that debris avalanche helped to produce the massive Osceola Mudflow, which traveled as far as present-day Tacoma and south Seattle. This massive avalanche of rock and ice removed the top 1,600 ft (500 m) of Rainier, bringing its height down to around 14,100 ft (4,300 m). About 530 to 550 years ago, the Electron Mudflow occurred, although this was not as large-scale as the Osceola Mudflow.

After the major collapse approximately 5,000 years ago, subsequent eruptions of lava and tephra built up the modern summit cone until about as recently as 1,000 years ago. As many as 11 Holocene tephra layers have been found.

Soils on Mount Rainier are mostly gravelly, ashy sandy loams developed from colluvium or glacial till mixed with volcanic tephra. Under forest cover, their profiles usually have the banded appearance of a classic podzol, but the E horizon is darker than usual. Under meadows, a thick dark A horizon usually forms the topsoil.

=== Modern activity and threat ===
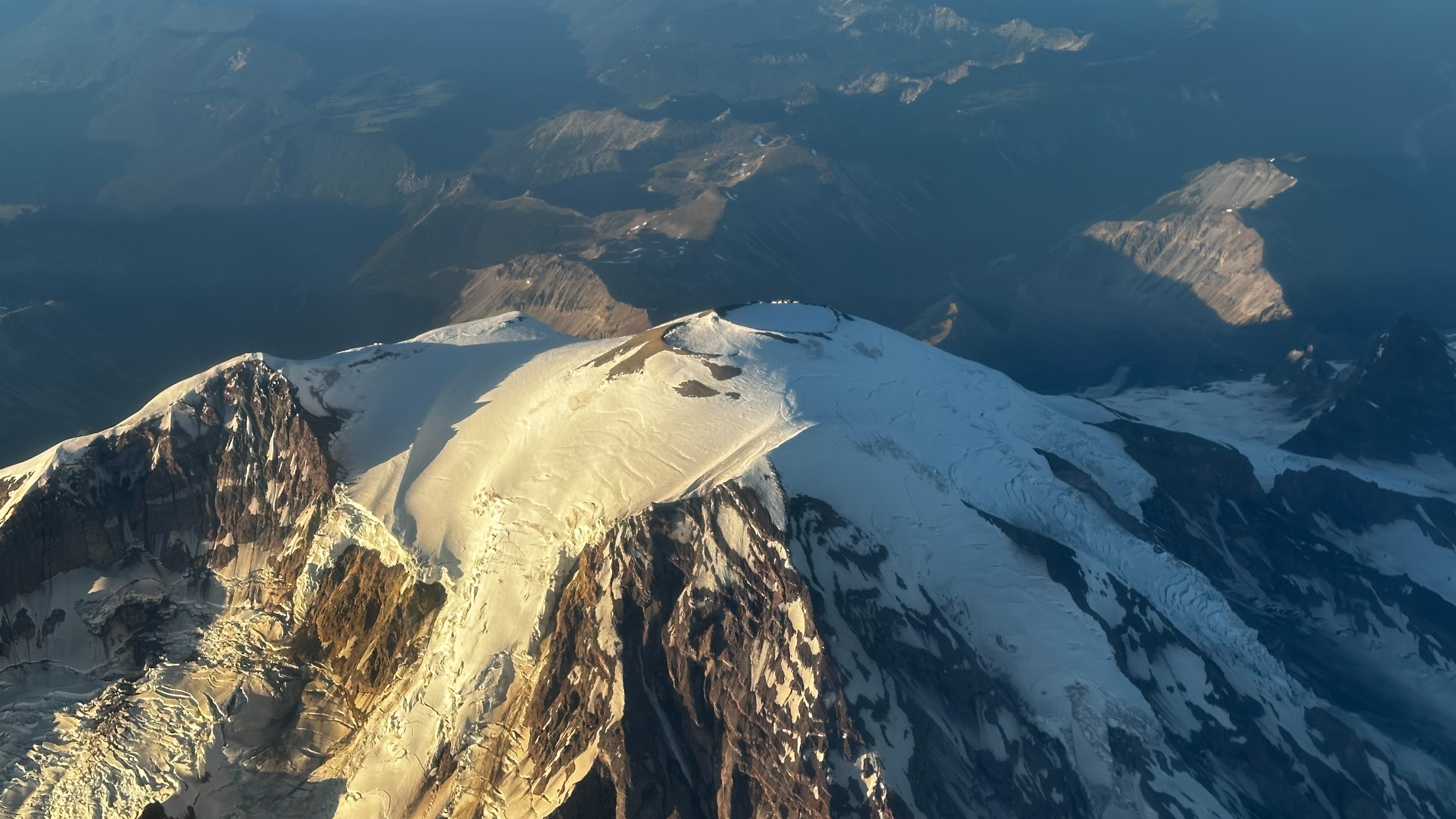
The summit of Mount Rainier showing summit calderas and the mountain's glaciers

The most recent recorded volcanic activity was between 1820 and 1854, but many eyewitnesses reported eruptive activity in 1858, 1870, 1879, 1882, and 1894 as well. Additionally, the Smithsonian Institution's volcanism project records the last volcanic eruption as 1450 CE.

Seismic monitors have been placed in Mount Rainier National Park and on the mountain itself to monitor activity. Because of the massive amounts of ash blasting out of the volcano into the atmosphere, an eruption could be deadly for all living in areas within the immediate vicinity. Effects from an eruption could be noticed from Vancouver, British Columbia to as far as San Francisco, California.

Mount Rainier is located in an area that itself is part of the eastern rim of the Pacific Ring of Fire. This includes mountains and calderas like Mount Shasta and Lassen Peak in California, Crater Lake, Three Sisters, and Mount Hood in Oregon, Mount St. Helens, Mount Adams, Glacier Peak, and Mount Baker in Washington, and Mount Cayley, Mount Garibaldi, Silverthrone Caldera, and Mount Meager in British Columbia. Many of the above are dormant, but could return to activity, and scientists on both sides of the border gather research of the past eruptions of each to predict how mountains in this arc will behave and what they are capable of in the future, including Mount Rainier. Of these, two have erupted since the beginning of the twentieth century: Lassen in 1915 and St. Helens in 1980 and 2004. However, past eruptions in this volcanic arc have multiple examples of sub-plinian eruptions or higher: Crater Lake's last eruption as Mount Mazama was large enough to cause its cone to collapse, and Mount Rainier's closest neighbor, Mount St. Helens, produced the largest recorded eruption in the continental United States when it erupted in 1980. Statistics place the likelihood of a major eruption in the Cascade Range at 2–3 per century.

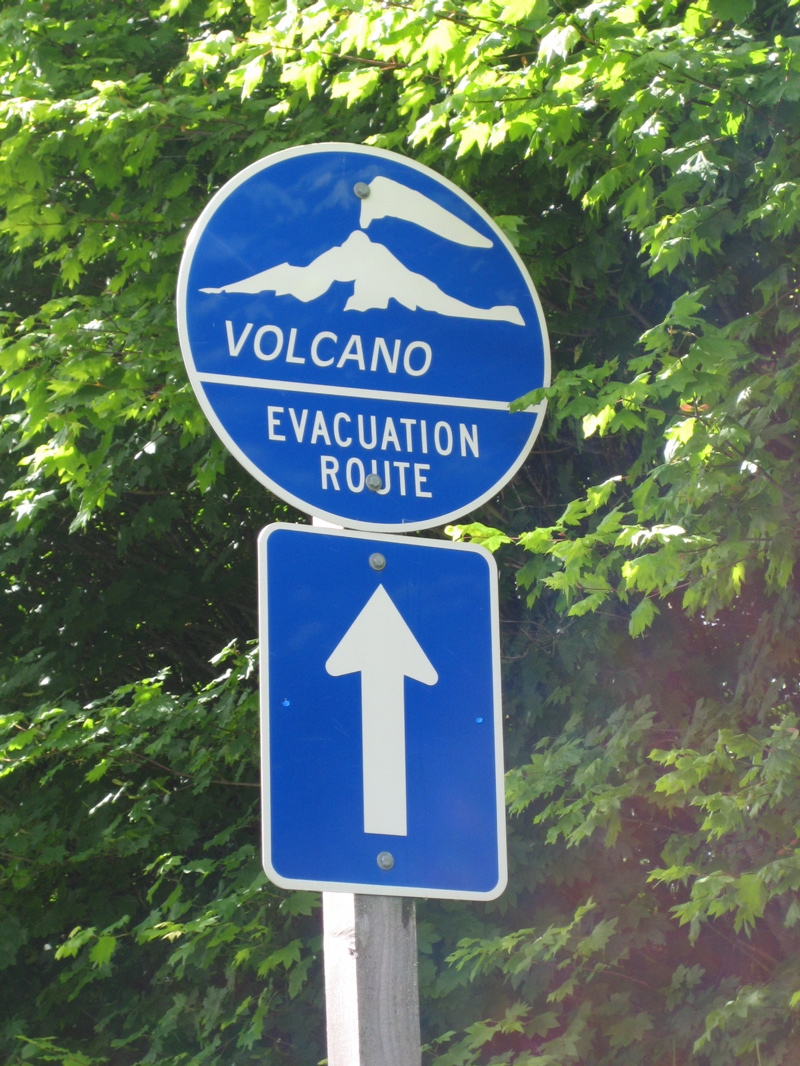
One of many emergency evacuation route signs in case of volcanic eruption or lahar around Mount Rainier

Mount Rainier is listed as a Decade Volcano, or one of 16 volcanoes on Earth with the greatest likelihood of causing loss of life and property if eruptive activity resumes. If Mount Rainier were to erupt as powerfully as Mount St. Helens did in its May 18, 1980 eruption, the effect would be cumulatively greater, because of the far more massive amounts of glacial ice locked on the volcano compared to Mount St. Helens, the vastly more heavily populated areas surrounding Rainier, and the fact that Mount Rainier is almost twice the size of St. Helens. Lahars from Rainier pose the most risk to life and property, as many communities lie atop older lahar deposits. According to the United States Geological Survey (USGS), about 150,000 people live on old lahar deposits of Rainier. Not only is there much ice atop the volcano, but the volcano is also slowly being weakened by hydrothermal activity. According to Geoff Clayton, a geologist with a Washington State Geology firm, RH2 Engineering, a repeat of the 5,000-year-old Osceola Mudflow would destroy Enumclaw, Orting, Kent, Auburn, Puyallup, Sumner and all of Renton. Such a mudflow might also reach down the Duwamish estuary and destroy parts of downtown Seattle, and cause tsunamis in Puget Sound and Lake Washington. Rainier is also capable of producing pyroclastic flows and expelling lava. A 2012 Washington State Department of Natural Resources estimate showed that a significant lahar could cause up to $40 billion in damage downriver.

According to Kevin Scott, a scientist with the USGS:

A home built in any of the probabilistically defined inundation areas on the new maps is more likely to be damaged or destroyed by a lahar than by fire... For example, a home built in an area that would be inundated every 100 years, on the average, is 27 times more likely to be damaged or destroyed by a flow than by fire. People know the danger of fire, so they buy fire insurance and they have smoke alarms, but most people are not aware of the risks of lahars, and few have applicable flood insurance.

The volcanic risk is somewhat mitigated by lahar warning sirens and escape route signs in Pierce County, part of the Mount Rainier Volcano Lahar Warning System, which was implemented by the USGS in 1998 and has been maintained by Pierce County since. The more populous King County is also in the lahar area, but has no zoning restrictions due to volcanic hazard. More recently (since 2001) funding from the federal government for lahar protection in the area has dried up, leading local authorities in at-risk cities like Orting to fear a disaster similar to the Armero tragedy. To prevent against such tragedies, authorities downriver from Rainier have conducted annual large-scale evacuation exercises in cooperation with local school districts. The 2024 drill included 45,000 students and staff from the Puyallup, Sumner–Bonney Lake, Orting, White River, and Carbonado School Districts. During the exercise, emergency operations centers in the cities of Puyallup, Bonney Lake, and Buckley were activated to help the movement of school students and staff.

=== Seismic background ===
Typically, up to five earthquakes are recorded monthly near the summit. Swarms of five to ten shallow earthquakes over two or three days take place from time to time, predominantly in the region of 13,000 feet (4 km) below the summit. These earthquakes are thought to be caused by the circulation of hot fluids beneath Mount Rainier. Presumably, hot springs and steam vents within Mount Rainier National Park are generated by such fluids. Seismic swarms (not initiated with a mainshock) are common features at volcanoes, and are rarely associated with eruptive activity. Rainier has had several such swarms; there were days-long swarms in 2002, 2004, 2007, 2009, 2011, 2021, and 2025. The 2025 swarm produced the largest number of events, the highest rate of events, and the largest amount of energy released since the monitoring began in 1982.

=== Glaciers ===
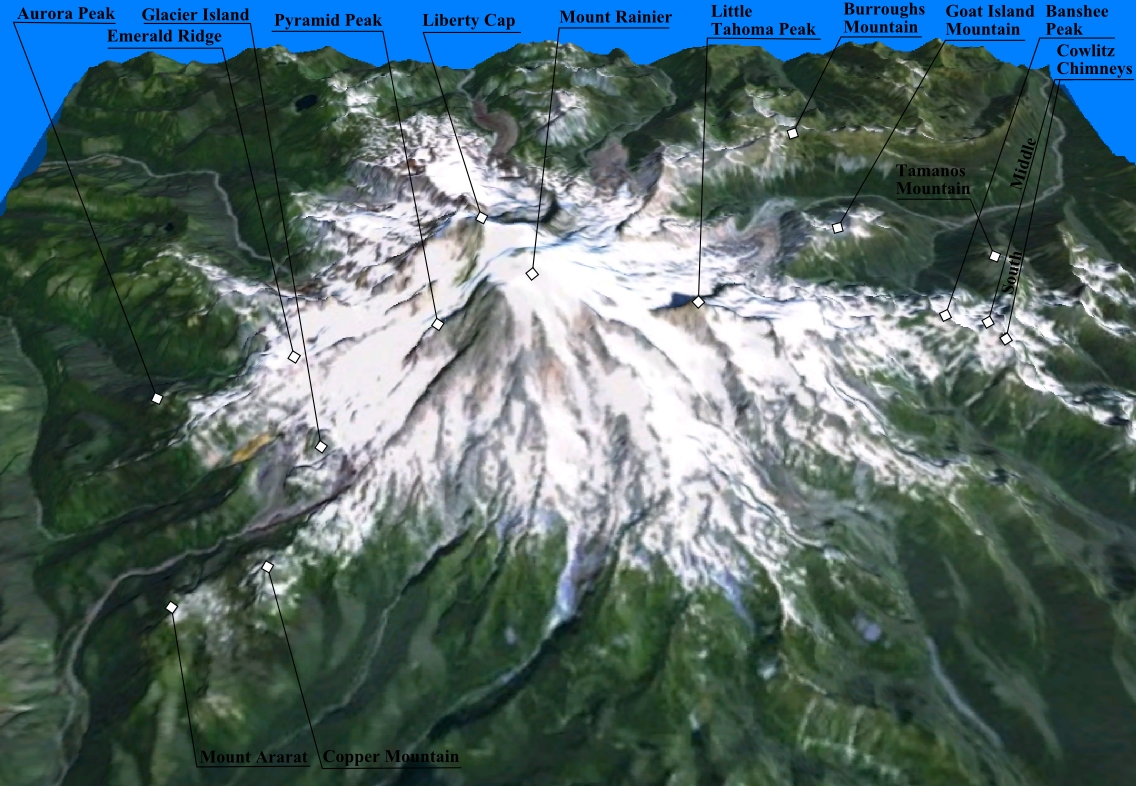
Three-dimensional representation of Mount Rainier

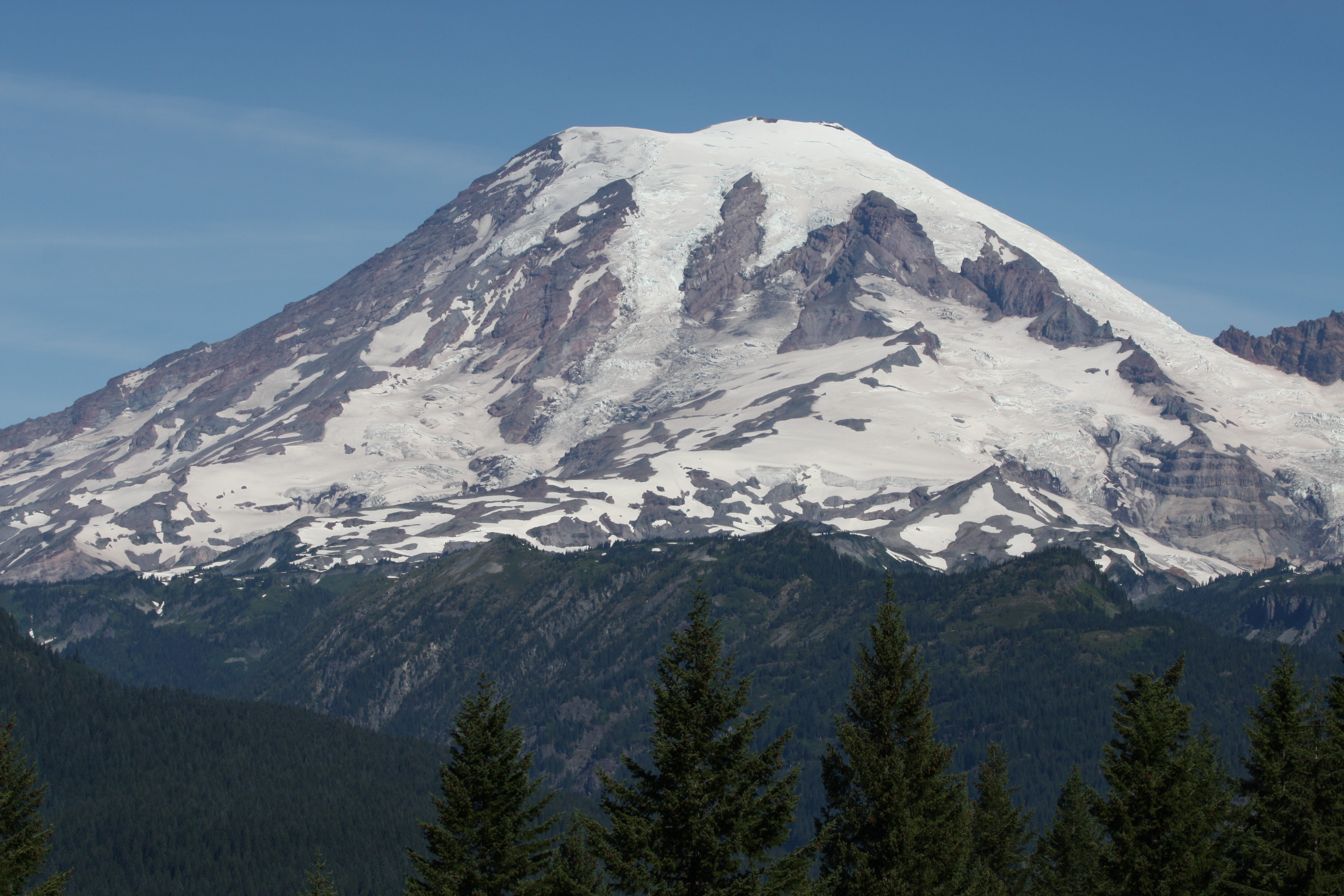
Nisqually Glacier is seen clearly from southeast of the mountain

Glaciers are among the most conspicuous and dynamic geologic features on Mount Rainier. They erode the volcanic cone and are important sources of streamflow for several rivers, including some that provide water for hydroelectric power and irrigation. Together with perennial snow patches, the 29 named glacial features cover about 30.41 square miles (78.8 km^{2}) of the mountain's surface in 2015 and have an estimated volume of about 0.69 cubic miles (2.9 km^{3}).

Glaciers flow under the influence of gravity by the combined action of sliding over the rock on which they lie and by deformation, the gradual displacement between and within individual ice crystals. Maximum speeds occur near the surface and along the centerline of the glacier. In May 1970, Nisqually Glacier was measured moving up to 29 inches (74 cm) per day. Flow rates are generally greater in summer than in winter, probably due to the presence of large quantities of meltwater at the glacier base.

The size of glaciers on Mount Rainier has fluctuated significantly in the past. For example, during the last ice age, from about 25,000 to about 15,000 years ago, glaciers covered most of the area now within the boundaries of Mount Rainier National Park and extended to the perimeter of the present Puget Sound Basin.

Between the 14th century and 1850, many of the glaciers on Mount Rainier advanced to their farthest extent downvalley since the last ice age. Many advances of this sort occurred worldwide during this time period known to geologists as the Little Ice Age. During the Little Ice Age, the Nisqually Glacier advanced to a position 650 to 800 ft (200 to 240 m) downvalley from the site of the Glacier Bridge, Tahoma and South Tahoma Glaciers merged at the base of Glacier Island, and the terminus of Emmons Glacier reached within 1.2 mi (1.9 km) of the White River Campground.

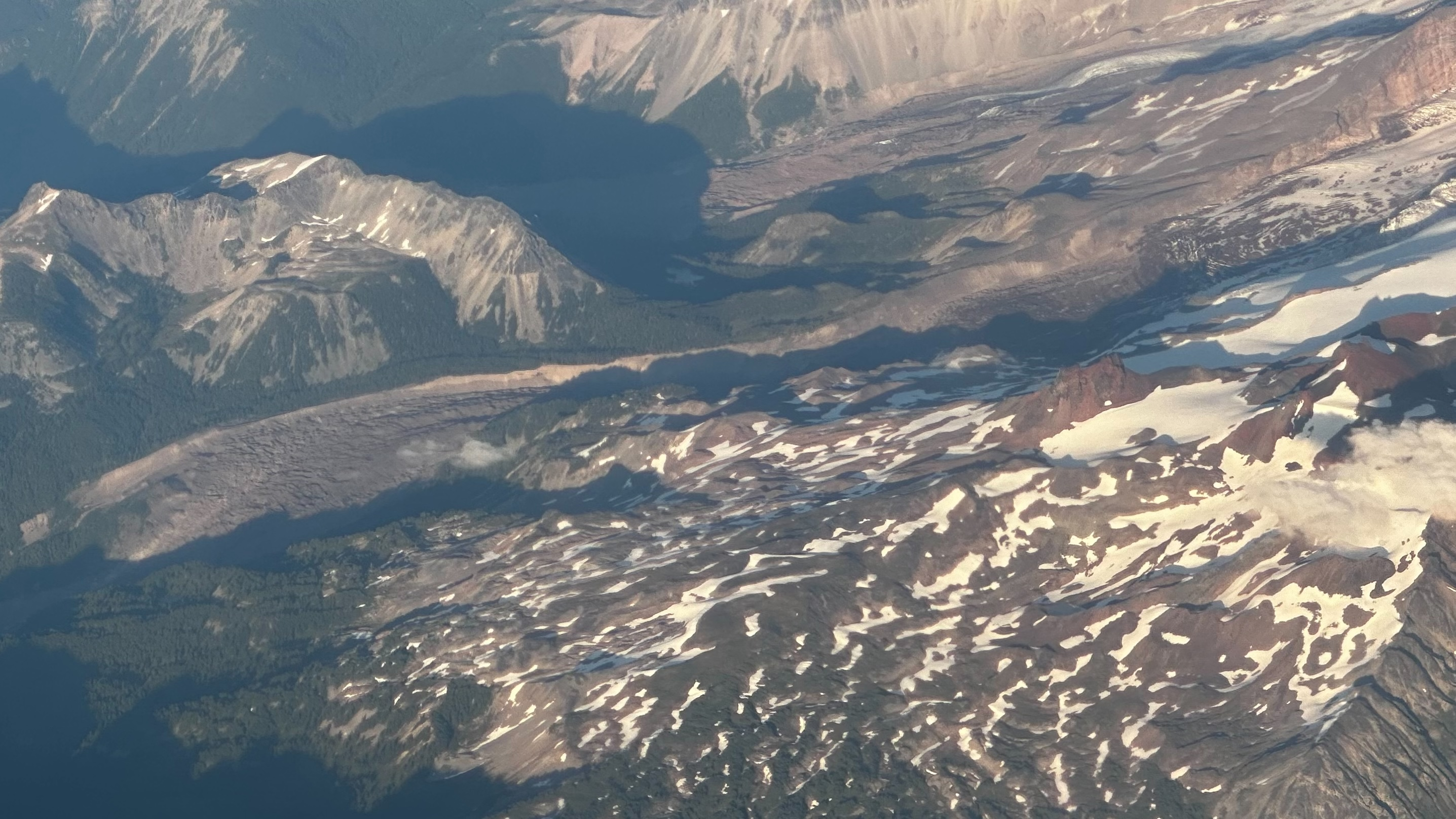
The rocky area left behind after the retreat of the North Mowich Glacier seen in July 2024

Retreat of the Little Ice Age glaciers was slow until about 1920, when retreat became more rapid. The Williwakas Glacier was considered extinct during the 1930s. Between the height of the Little Ice Age and 1950, Mount Rainier's glaciers lost about one-quarter of their length. Beginning in 1950 and continuing through the early 1980s, however, many of the major glaciers advanced in response to the relatively cooler temperatures in the mid-century. The glaciers and snowfields of Mount Rainier also lost volume during this time, except for the Frying Pan and Emmons glaciers on the east flank and the small near-peak snowfields; the greatest volume loss was concentrated from ~1750 m (north) to ~2250 m (south) elevation. The largest single volume loss is from the Carbon Glacier, although it is to the north, due to its huge area at <2000 m elevation. The Carbon, Cowlitz, Emmons, and Nisqually Glaciers advanced during the late 1970s and early 1980s as a result of high snowfalls during the 1960s and 1970s.

Since the early 1980s, however, many glaciers have been thinning and retreating, and some advances have slowed. In a study using data from 2021, National Park Service scientists removed Stevens Glacier from its inventory of Mount Rainier glaciers due to its dwindling size and lack of evidence that it was moving. Using satellite data in 2022, researchers at Nichols College determined that both Pyramid and Van Trump glaciers had also ceased to exist with only fragments of ice remaining. A significant decline had been noted between 2015 and 2022.

The glaciers on Mount Rainier can generate mudflows through glacial outburst floods not associated with an eruption. The South Tahoma Glacier generated 30 floods in the 1980s and early 1990s, and again in August 2015.

== History ==
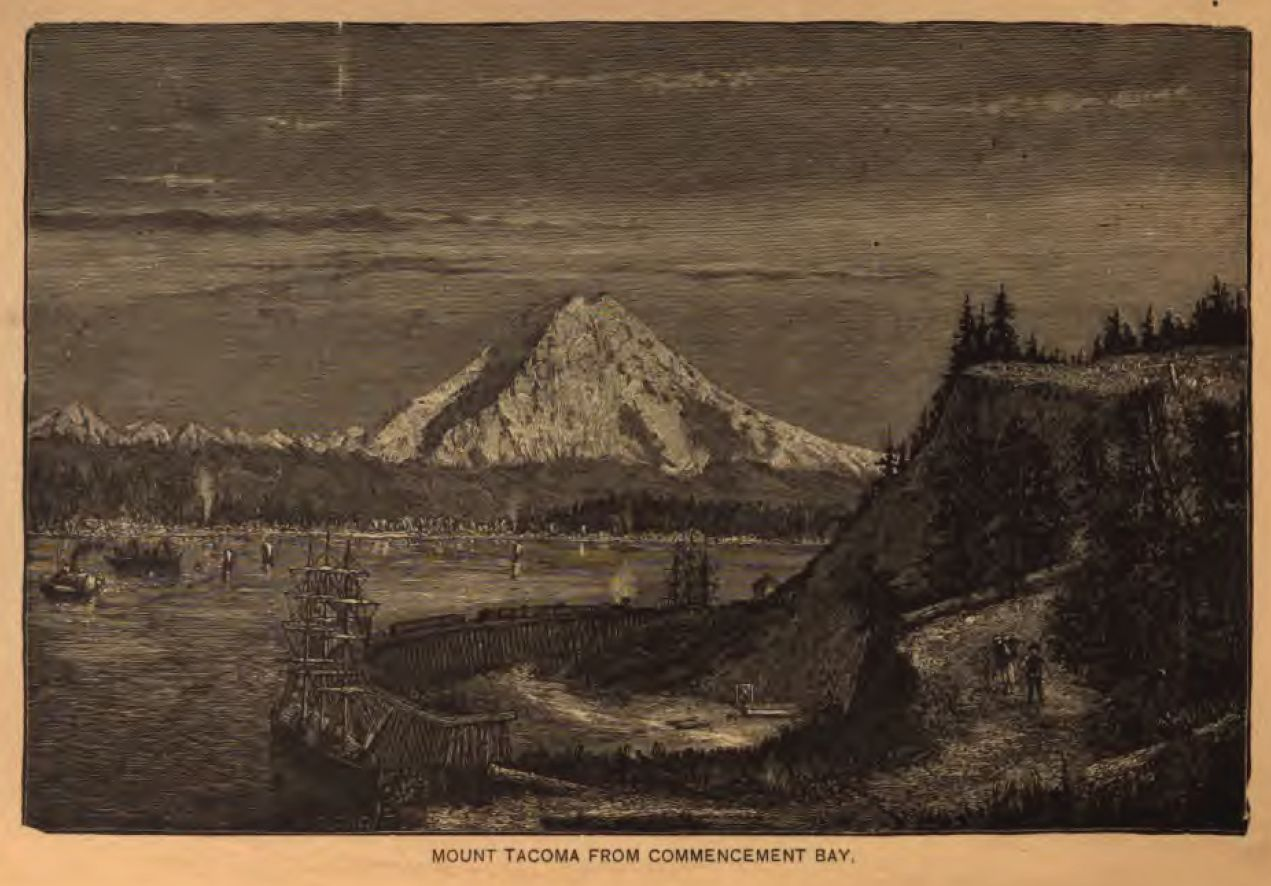
Artist rendering of Mount Tacoma from Commencement Bay, 1888.

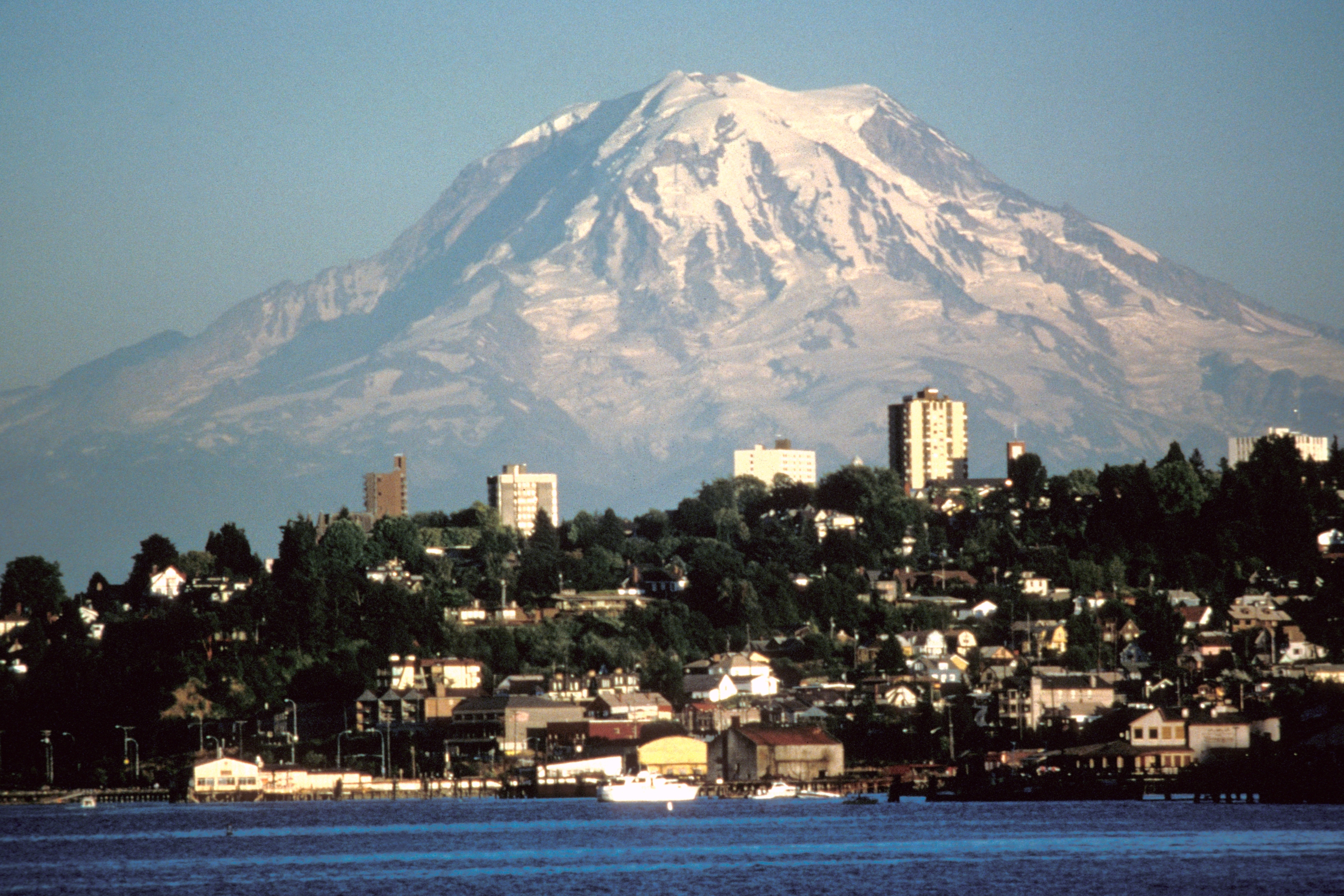
Viewed from the northwest (Tacoma), Liberty Cap is the apparent summit with Mowich Face below.

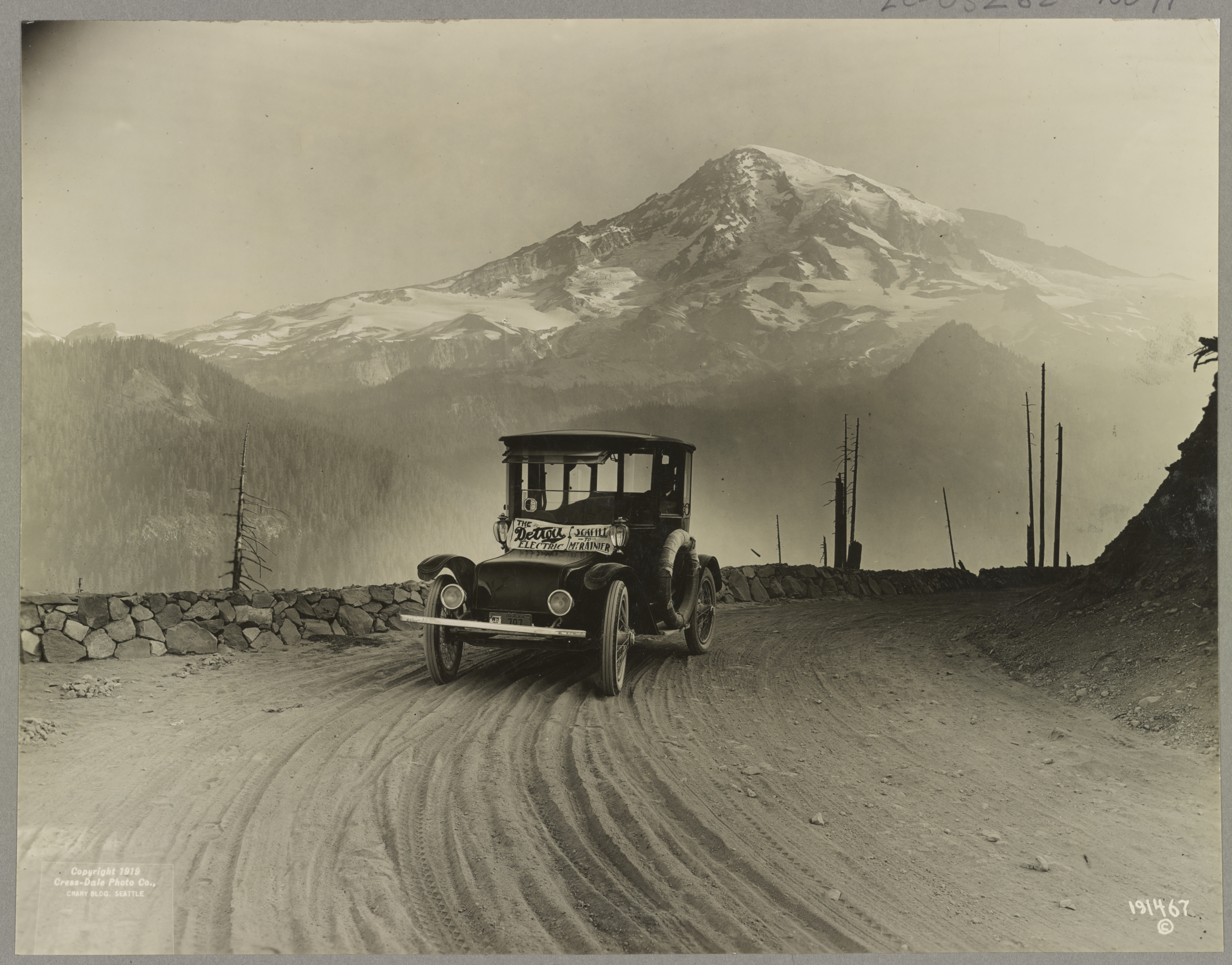
A 1919 Detroit Electric car on a promotional tour from Seattle to Mt. Rainier, with the mountain in the background.

For thousands of years, the area surrounding Mount Rainier has been inhabited by several Indigenous peoples, who traditionally hunted and gathered animals and plants in Mount Rainier's forests and high elevation meadows. These peoples and their modern-day descendants are represented today by the members of the federally-recognized tribes which surround the mountain, including the Nisqually Indian Tribe, the Cowlitz Indian Tribe, the Confederated Tribes and Bands of the Yakama Nation, the Puyallup Tribe of Indians, and the Muckleshoot Indian Tribe, among others in the area.

The archaeological record of human use of the mountain dates to over 8,500 years before present (BP). Sites related to seasonal use of Mount Rainier and its landscapes are reflected in chipped stone tool remains and settings suggesting functionally varied uses, including task-specific sites, rockshelters, travel stops, and long-term base camps. Their distribution on the mountain suggests primary use of subalpine meadows and low alpine habitats that provided relatively high resource abundance during the short summer season. Evidence suggests that there existed a tradition of Native Americans setting fire to areas of the region each year as a way to encourage meadow development.

The first Europeans to reach the Pacific Northwest were the Spanish who arrived by sea in 1774 led by Juan Perez. The next year, under the direction of Juan Francisco de la Bodega y Quadra, a boat was sent ashore to Destruction island. Upon landing, the crew was attacked and killed by the local indigenous population. Although attempts were made in 1792 to create a permanent Spanish settlement at Neah Bay, the project was unsuccessful and by 1795, Spain had given up on the region. Although not documented anywhere, it is likely that Spanish sailors first observed Mount Rainier while sailing in the Strait of Juan de Fuca.

Upon reaching what would become California in 1579, Sir Francis Drake claimed the entire northwest coast of North America for England. This claim to the coast of the Pacific Northwest was not further explored until in 1778 Captain James Cook sailed the coastline of modern-day Washington and British Columbia, stimulating a subsequent increase in English ships coming to the area as part of the fur trade. On July 22, 1793, Sir Alexander Mackenzie of the British Northwest Fur Company reached the Pacific Ocean via an overland route that crossed the Rocky Mountains.

The first American, John Ledyard, reached the region aboard Captain Cook's ship in 1778. By 1787, six Americans from Boston formed a company that began trading along the northwest coast. The Lewis and Clark overland expedition reached the northwest coast in 1805 and observed Mount Rainier for the first time in early 1806.

The first documented sighting of Mt. Rainier by a European was by the crew of Captain George Vancouver on May 7, 1792, during the Vancouver Expedition (1790–1795). On May 8, 1792, Vancouver gave the name of Mt. Rainier to the observed peak in homage to Vancouver's friend Rear Admiral Peter Rainier.

At the outset of the 19th century, the region where Mt. Rainier was located was claimed by Spain, the U.S., Russia, and Great Britain, with most claims based on instances of early naval exploration of the region's coast. Spain relinquished all remaining claims to the Pacific Northwest that had not already been handed over with the Louisiana Purchase in 1819 with the purchase and cession of Florida by the United States. In 1824, Russia ceded all land claims south of parallel 54°40′ north to the United States as part of the Russo-American Treaty. In 1818, the United States and the United Kingdom signed a treaty, agreeing upon the joint settlement and occupation of the Oregon country which consisted of the territory north of 42°N latitude, south of 54°40′N latitude, and west of the Rocky Mountains to the Pacific Ocean. The 1846 Oregon Treaty between the United States and United Kingdom set new borders between British and American territory along today's approximate borders. In 1853, the land between the Columbia river and the border with British Canada was organized into the Washington Territory, which was the administrative status of the region at the time of the first successful ascent of Mount Rainier.

In 1833, William Fraser Tolmie explored the area in search of medicinal plants. Hazard Stevens and P. B. Van Trump received a hero's welcome in the streets of Olympia after their successful summit climb in 1870. The first female ascent was made in 1890 by Fay Fuller, accompanied by Van Trump and three other teammates.

Descending from the summit in 1883, James Longmire discovered a mineral spring; he established a spa and hotel, drawing other visitors to the area to seek the spring's benefits. Later, the headquarters of the national park would be established at Longmire, until flooding caused them to be relocated to Ashford. The area also became the site of features like a museum, a post office, and a gas station, with additions like a library and a gift shop soon following; many of these buildings were ultimately nominated to the National Register of Historic Places. Longmire remains the second most popular place in the park. In 1924, a publication from the park described the area:

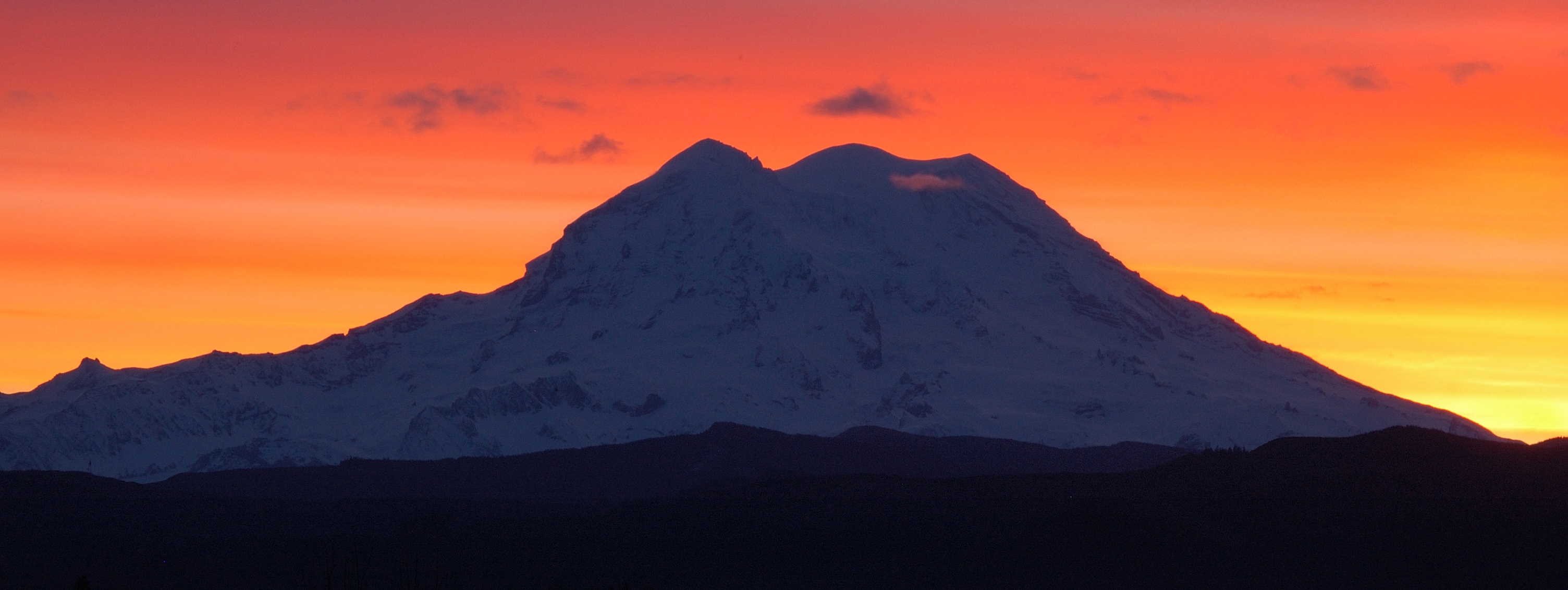
Mount Rainier sunset

"A feature at Longmire Springs of great interest to everyone is the group of mineral springs in the little flat to the west of National Park Inn. There are some forty distinct springs, a half dozen of which are easily reached from the road. An analysis of the waters show that they all contain about the smae [sic] mineral salts but in slightly differing proportions. All the water is highly carbonated and would be classed as extremely "hard". Certain springs contain larger amounts of soda, iron and sulphur, giving them a distinct taste and color."

John Muir climbed Mount Rainier in 1888, and although he enjoyed the view, he conceded that it was best appreciated from below. Muir was one of many who advocated protecting the mountain. In 1893, the area was set aside as part of the Pacific Forest Reserve to protect its physical and economic resources, primarily timber and watersheds.

Citing the need to also protect scenery and provide for public enjoyment, railroads and local businesses urged the creation of a national park in hopes of increased tourism. On March 2, 1899, President William McKinley established Mount Rainier National Park as America's fifth national park. Congress dedicated the new park "for the benefit and enjoyment of the people" and "... for the preservation from injury or spoliation of all timber, mineral deposits, natural curiosities, or wonders within said park, and their retention in their natural condition."

On April 30, 1936, Mount Rainier National Park and Japan's Fuji-Hakone National Park started a first-of-its-kind international 'sister mountain' relationship, with Rainier affectionately known as 'Tacoma-Fuji' by Japanese American immigrants of the Seattle area.

On June 24, 1947, Kenneth Arnold reported seeing a formation of nine unidentified flying objects over Mount Rainier. His description led to the term "flying saucers".

In 1998, the United States Geological Survey began putting together the Mount Rainier Volcano Lahar Warning System to assist in the emergency evacuation of the Puyallup River valley in the event of a catastrophic debris flow. It is now run by the Pierce County Department of Emergency Management. Tacoma, at the mouth of the Puyallup, is only 37 mi (60 km) west of Rainier, and moderately sized towns such as Puyallup and Orting are only 27 and 20 mi (43 and 32 km) away, respectively.

Mount Rainier appears on four distinct United States postage stamp issues. In 1934, it was the 3-cent issue in a series of National Park stamps, and was also shown on a souvenir sheet issued for a philatelic convention. The following year, in 1935, both stamps were reprinted by Postmaster General James A. Farley as special issues given to officials and friends. Because of complaints by the public, "Farley's Follies" were reproduced in large numbers. The second stamp issue is easy to tell from the original because it is imperforate. Both stamps and souvenir sheets are widely available.

The Washington state quarter, which was released on April 11, 2007, features Mount Rainier and a salmon.

== Climbing ==
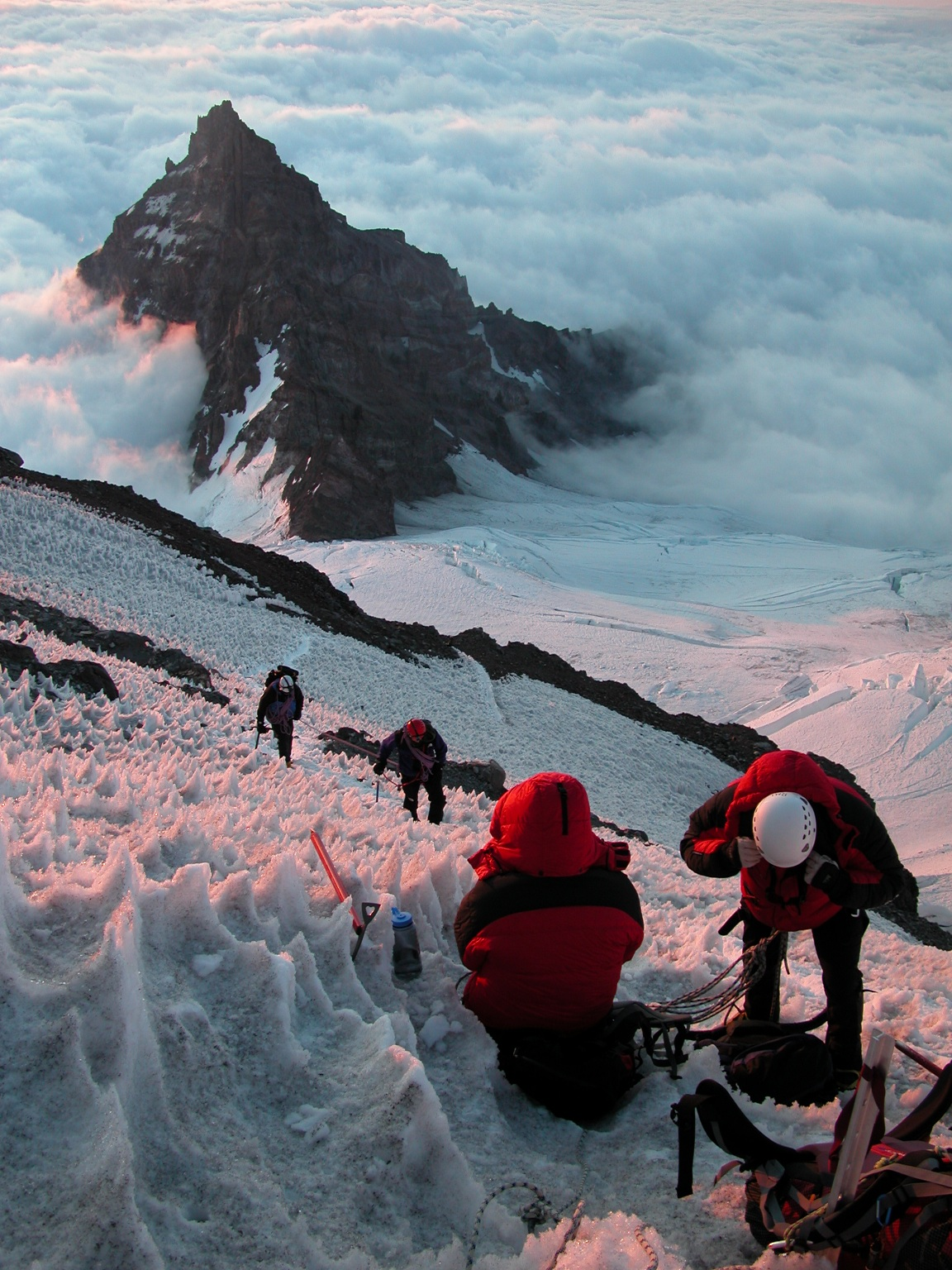
Climbers on Ingraham Glacier, above Little Tahoma

Mountain climbing on Mount Rainier is difficult, involving traversing the largest glaciers in the U.S. south of Alaska. Most climbers require two to three days to reach the summit, with a success rate of approximately 50%, with weather and the climber's physical conditioning being the most common reasons for failure. About 10,000 to 11,000 people attempt the climb each year, making it one of the most popular in the world. Approximately 90 percent of summit attempts use routes from Camp Muir on the southeast flank, and most of the rest ascend Emmons Glacier via Camp Schurman on the northeast.

=== Climbing routes ===
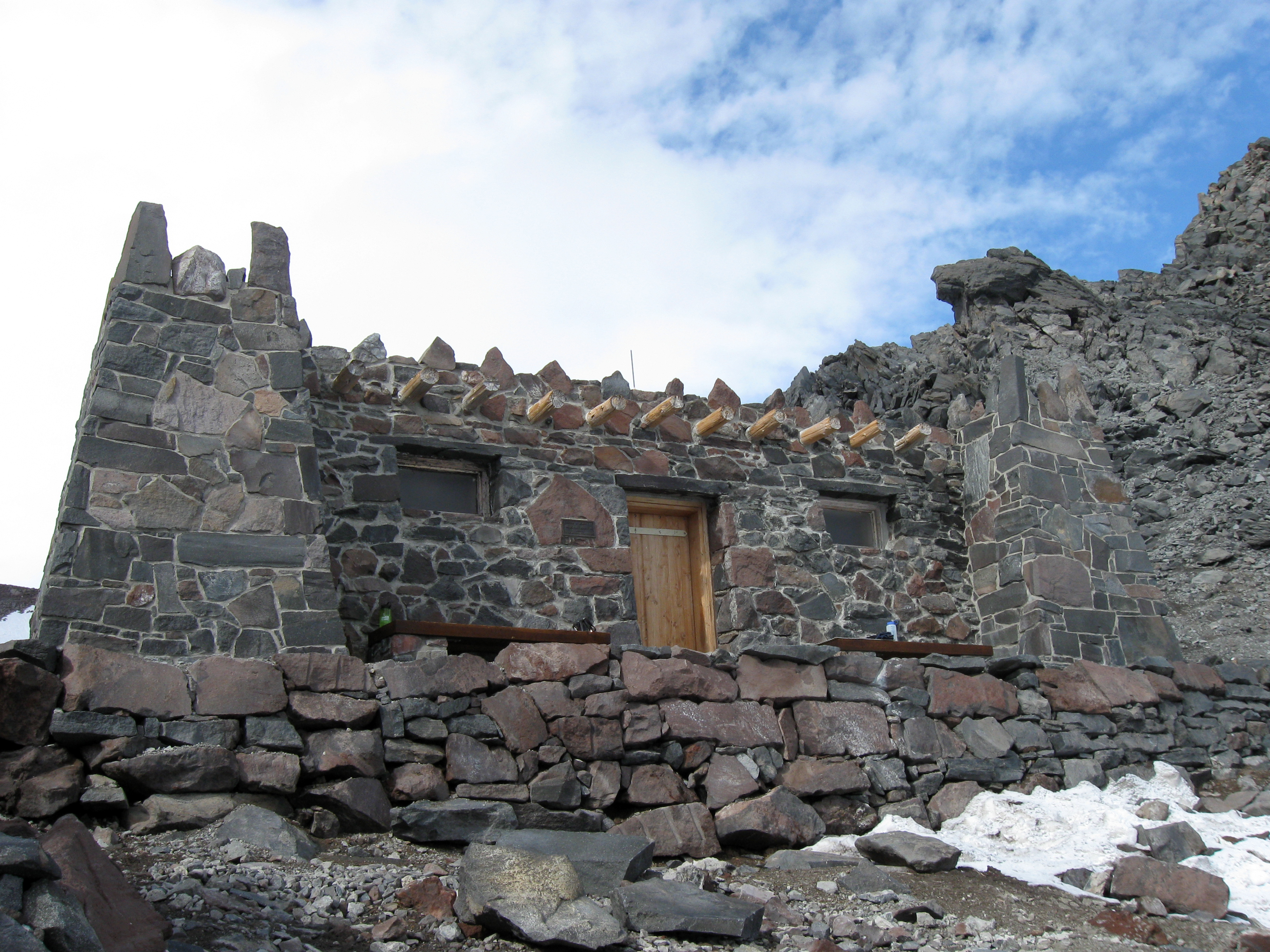
Camp Muir is commonly used by those attempting to summit Mount Rainier

All climbing routes on Mount Rainier require climbers to possess some level of technical climbing skill. This includes ascending and descending the mountain using technical climbing equipment such as crampons, ice axes, harnesses, and ropes. The difficulty and technical challenge of climbing Mount Rainier can vary widely between climbing routes. Routes are graded in NCCS Alpine Climbing format.

The normal route to the summit of Mount Rainier is the Disappointment Cleaver Route, YDS grade II-III. As climbers on this route have access to the permanently established Camp Muir, it sees the significant majority of climbing traffic on the mountain. This route is also the most common commercially guided route. "Cleaver" is used to describe a rock ridge that separates two glaciers. Why this cleaver is a "disappointment" is unrecorded, but it is thought to come from climbers reaching it and recognizing their inability to reach the summit. An alternative route to the Disappointment Cleaver is the Ingraham Glacier Direct Route, grade II, and is often used when the Disappointment Cleaver route cannot be climbed due to poor route conditions.

The Emmons Glacier Route, grade II, is an alternative to the Disappointment Cleaver route and poses a lower technical challenge to climbers. The climbers on this route can use Camp Schurman (9,500 ft), a glacial campsite. Camp Schurman is equipped with a solar toilet and a ranger hut.

The Liberty Ridge Route, grade IV, is considerably more challenging and an objectively more dangerous route than the normal route to the summit. It runs up the center of the north face of Mount Rainier and crosses the very active Carbon Glacier. First climbed by Ome Daiber, Arnie Campbell, and Jim Burrow in 1935, it is listed as one of the Fifty Classic Climbs of North America by Steve Roper and Allen Steck. This route only accounts for approximately 2% of climbers on the mountain, but approximately 25% of its deaths.

=== Dangers and accidents ===
About two mountaineering deaths each year occur because of rock and ice fall, avalanche, falls, and hypothermia. These incidents are often associated with exposure to very high altitude, fatigue, dehydration, or poor weather. 89 deaths on Mount Rainier have been reported from 1897 to 2011. Approximately 7 percent of mountaineering deaths and 6 percent of mountaineering accidents in the United States are attributed to Mount Rainier.

The first known climbing death on Mount Rainier was Edgar McClure, a professor of chemistry at the University of Oregon, on July 27, 1897. Descending in the dark, McClure stepped over a rock edge and slid to his death on a rocky outcrop. The spot is now known as McClure Rock.

The worst mountaineering accident on Mount Rainier occurred in 1981, when ten clients and a guide died in an avalanche/ice fall on the Ingraham Glacier. This was the largest number of fatalities on Mount Rainier in a single incident since 32 people were killed in a 1946 plane crash on the South Tahoma Glacier.

In one of the worst disasters on the mountain in over thirty years, six climbers – two guides, and four clients – were killed on May 31, 2014, after the climbers fell 3,300 feet (1,000 m) while attempting the summit via the Liberty Ridge climbing route. Low-flying search helicopters pinged the climbers' avalanche beacons, and officials concluded that there was no chance anyone survived. Searchers found tents and clothes along with rock and ice strewn across a debris field on the Carbon Glacier at 9,500 ft (2,900 m), possible evidence for a slide or avalanche in the vicinity where the team went missing, but the exact cause of the accident is unknown. The bodies of three of the client climbers were spotted on August 7, 2014, during a training flight and subsequently recovered on August 19. The bodies of the fourth client and the two guides were never found.

== Outdoor recreation ==
In addition to climbing, hiking, backcountry skiing, photography, and camping are popular activities in the park. Hiking trails, including the Wonderland Trail—a 93-mile (150 km) circumnavigation of the peak, provide access to the backcountry. Popular for winter sports include snowshoeing and cross-country skiing.

== Climate ==
Mount Rainier's climate is shaped by the interaction of its great elevation with the moisture-laden marine air arriving from the Pacific Ocean roughly 130 miles (210 km) to the west. The mountain rises more than 13,000 feet (4,000 m) above its surroundings directly into the path of the cool-season storm track produced by the Aleutian Low over the sub-polar North Pacific. Extratropical cyclones spawned along this storm track are steered eastward by the polar jet stream toward the Pacific Northwest coast, where the Olympic Mountains intercept and partially exhaust them before the residual systems re-organize over the Puget Sound lowland and encounter the Cascade Range. Mount Rainier, sitting at the southwestern edge of the central Cascades, then forces this remaining flow to rise abruptly through more than two vertical miles of atmosphere. The air cools at the moist adiabatic rate as it ascends, condenses, and deposits the bulk of its remaining moisture on the mountain's windward slopes as snow during the cool season. The mountain is large enough that it generates its own local weather: orographic clouds, lenticular caps, and post-frontal precipitation maxima are commonly observed even when surrounding lowlands are dry.

Precipitation type varies sharply with elevation. At the park's lower stations — Longmire (2,762 feet (842 m)) and Ohanapecosh (1,914 feet (583 m)) — much of the cool-season precipitation falls as rain, with totals in the range of 80 to 85 inches (2,000 to 2,200 mm) annually. Above roughly 4,000 feet (1,200 m), snow dominates from October through May. The Paradise weather station at 5,400 feet (1,600 m) on the south flank is the best-documented snow-climate station on the mountain. Paradise averages roughly 640 in (1,600 cm) of snowfall annually — about 53 feet (16 m) — making it widely considered the snowiest regularly-staffed location on Earth, or among the snowiest. During the 1971–1972 snow year, Paradise recorded 1,122 inches (2,850 cm) — 93.5 feet (28.5 m) — which stood as the world record for measured seasonal snowfall until it was surpassed by Mount Baker during the 1998–1999 season. Snowfall at Paradise has fallen below 400 inches (1,000 cm) only a handful of times in the past century, with the modern low of 266 inches (680 cm) set in the 2014–2015 winter. Snowpack at Paradise commonly exceeds 20 feet (6.1 m) by mid-spring and frequently persists at the meadows well into July.

The summit of Mount Rainier has an ice cap climate (Köppen climate classification: EF)

Climate data for Mount Rainier Summit, 1991–2020 normals (extrapolated)
Month	Jan	Feb	Mar	Apr	May	Jun	Jul	Aug	Sep	Oct	Nov	Dec	Year
Mean daily maximum °F (°C)	1.2 (−17.1)	2.4 (−16.4)	4.1 (−15.5)	8.0 (−13.3)	16.7 (−8.5)	22.3 (−5.4)	31.2 (−0.4)	32.5 (0.3)	24.0 (−4.4)	15.4 (−9.2)	4.7 (−15.2)	0.2 (−17.7)	13.6 (−10.2)
Mean daily minimum °F (°C)	−10.0 (−23.3)	−10.5 (−23.6)	−9.0 (−22.8)	−6.1 (−21.2)	0.7 (−17.4)	5.0 (−15.0)	11.2 (−11.6)	12.1 (−11.1)	7.8 (−13.4)	1.1 (−17.2)	−7.4 (−21.9)	−11.4 (−24.1)	−1.4 (−18.5)
Average precipitation inches (mm)	14.09 (358)	11.49 (292)	11.38 (289)	6.73 (171)	3.62 (92)	3.08 (78)	1.13 (29)	1.30 (33)	3.01 (76)	7.61 (193)	12.89 (327)	13.60 (345)	89.93 (2,284)
Average dew point °F (°C)	−4.8 (−20.4)	−8.7 (−22.6)	−9.0 (−22.8)	−7.6 (−22.0)	−2.0 (−18.9)	3.4 (−15.9)	8.1 (−13.3)	7.9 (−13.4)	5.3 (−14.8)	1.8 (−16.8)	−4.0 (−20.0)	−6.0 (−21.1)	−1.3 (−18.5)
Source: PRISM Climate Group

Climate data for Camp Muir, Washington (10,110 ft), (2014–2022 normals and extremes)
Month	Jan	Feb	Mar	Apr	May	Jun	Jul	Aug	Sep	Oct	Nov	Dec	Year
Record high °F (°C)	47.9 (8.8)	48.5 (9.2)	48.0 (8.9)	60.1 (15.6)	53.9 (12.2)	66.5 (19.2)	66.8 (19.3)	68.6 (20.3)	64.3 (17.9)	57.0 (13.9)	51.3 (10.7)	47.7 (8.7)	68.6 (20.3)
Mean daily maximum °F (°C)	23.2 (−4.9)	22.0 (−5.6)	22.8 (−5.1)	26.9 (−2.8)	35.1 (1.7)	40.5 (4.7)	48.0 (8.9)	50.0 (10.0)	42.1 (5.6)	34.8 (1.6)	26.2 (−3.2)	21.1 (−6.1)	32.7 (0.4)
Daily mean °F (°C)	17.7 (−7.9)	15.3 (−9.3)	16.4 (−8.7)	20.0 (−6.7)	28.4 (−2.0)	34.8 (1.6)	42.8 (6.0)	44.4 (6.9)	36.7 (2.6)	29.2 (−1.6)	20.5 (−6.4)	15.1 (−9.4)	26.8 (−2.9)
Mean daily minimum °F (°C)	12.6 (−10.8)	9.0 (−12.8)	10.8 (−11.8)	14.3 (−9.8)	23.1 (−4.9)	29.6 (−1.3)	38.5 (3.6)	39.7 (4.3)	31.9 (−0.1)	23.8 (−4.6)	14.8 (−9.6)	9.5 (−12.5)	21.5 (−5.8)
Record low °F (°C)	−11.2 (−24.0)	−11.6 (−24.2)	−4.3 (−20.2)	−6.2 (−21.2)	0.7 (−17.4)	4.0 (−15.6)	19.3 (−7.1)	23.8 (−4.6)	7.4 (−13.7)	0.5 (−17.5)	−3.8 (−19.9)	−14.4 (−25.8)	−14.4 (−25.8)
Average relative humidity (%)	72.2	69.7	69.3	63.5	63.2	54.4	42.5	43.0	54.2	62.3	71.5	72.5	61.5
Source: NWAC

== Ecology ==
Mount Rainier's protected status as a national park protects its primeval Cascade ecosystem, providing a stable habitat for many species in the region, including endemic flora and fauna that are unique to the area, such as the Cascade red fox and Mount Rainier lousewort. The ecosystem on the mountain is very diverse, owing to the climate found at different elevations. Scientists track the distinct species found in the forest zone, the subalpine zone, and the alpine zone. They have discovered more than one thousand species of plants and fungi. The mountain is also home to 65 species of mammals, 5 reptiles, 182 birds, 14 amphibians, and 14 species of native fish, in addition to an innumerable amount of invertebrates.

=== Flora ===
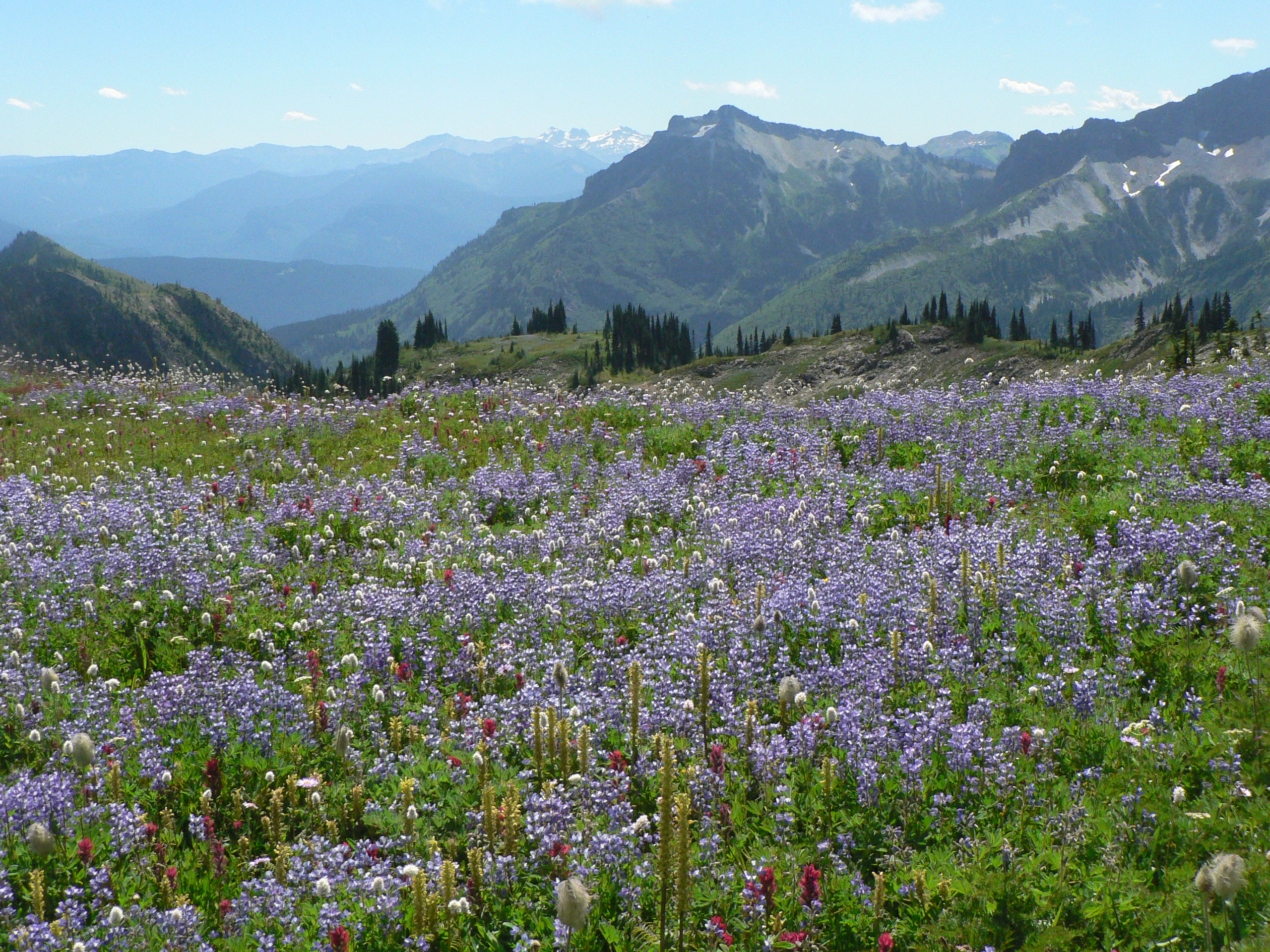
Subalpine wildflower meadow in Paradise region of Mount Rainier

Mount Rainier has regularly been described as one of the best places in the world to view wildflowers. In the subalpine region of the mountain, the snow often stays on the ground until summer begins, limiting plants to a much shorter growing season. This produces dramatic blooms in areas like Paradise. In 1924, the flowers were described by naturalist Floyd W. Schmoe:

Mount Rainier National Park is perhaps better known the world over for these wonderful flowers than for any one feature. The mountains, the glaciers, the cascading streams and the forests may be equalled if one looks far away enough, but no park has been so favored in the way of wild flowers.

Forests on the mountain span from as young as 100 years old to sections of old growth forest that are calculated to be 1000 years or more in age. The lower elevation consists mainly of western red-cedar, Douglas fir, and western hemlock. Pacific silver fir, western white pine, Alaska yellow cedar, and noble fir are found further up the mountain. In the alpine level, Alaskan yellow cedar, subalpine fir, and mountain hemlock grow.

=== Fauna ===
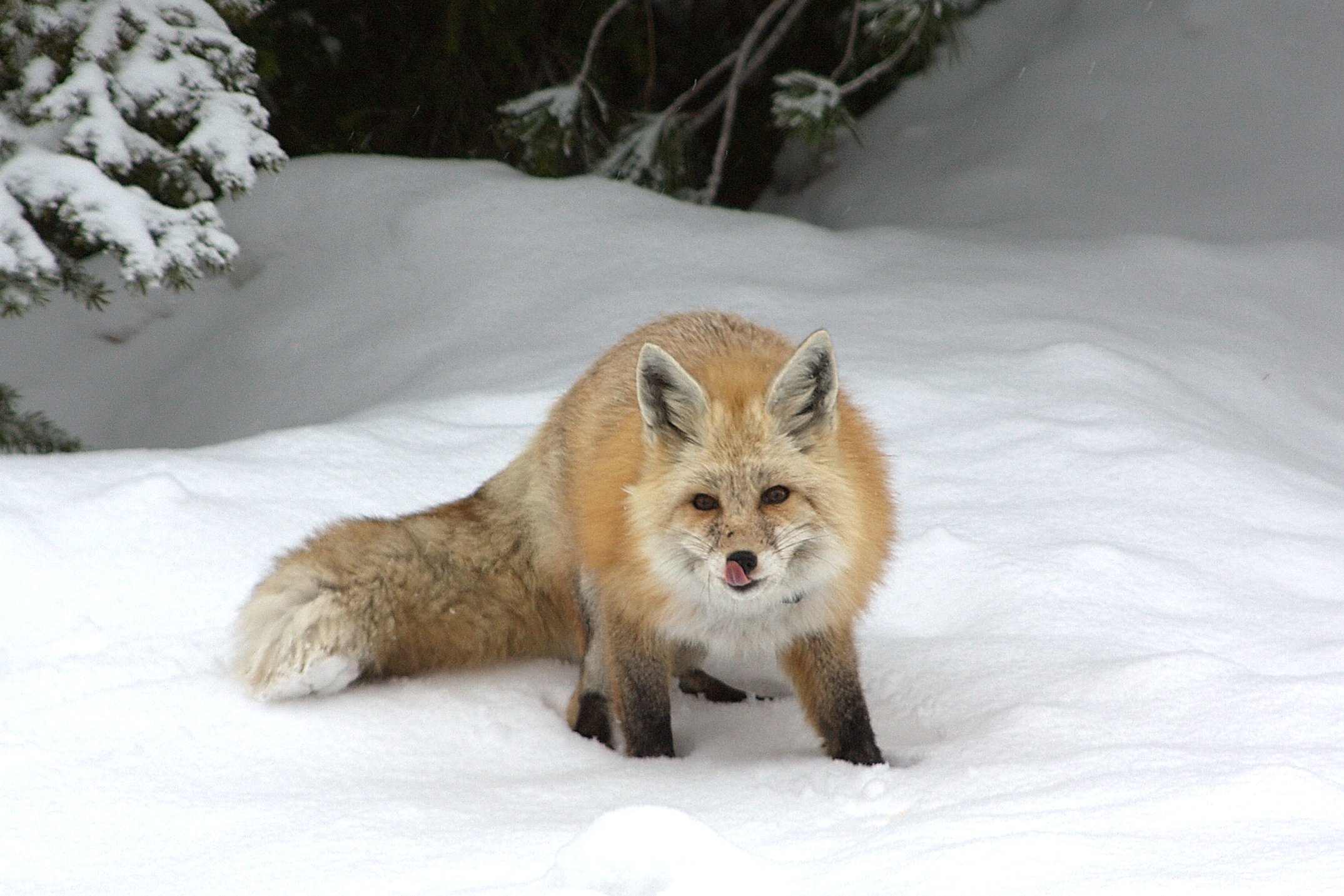
A Cascade red fox active during Paradise's long winter

The mountain supports a wide variety of animal life, including several species protected at the state or federal level, like the northern spotted owl. Efforts are also being made to reintroduce native species that had locally been hunted to extinction, like the Pacific fisher. There are sixty-five types of mammals living on the mountain, including cougars, mountain goats, marmots, and elk. Common reptiles and amphibians include garter snakes, frogs, and salamanders. There are many types of birds found throughout the different elevations on the mountain, but while some live there all year, many are migratory. Salmon and trout species use the rivers formed by the glaciers, and though the lakes stopped being stocked in 1972, thirty lakes still have reproducing populations.

== See also ==
- Bibliography of Mount Rainier National Park
- List of the most prominent summits of the United States
- Mount Fuji - a 'sister mountain' of Mount Rainier
- Mount Vesuvius
- Volcán de Colima
