= List of mountaineering fatalities in Washington (state) =

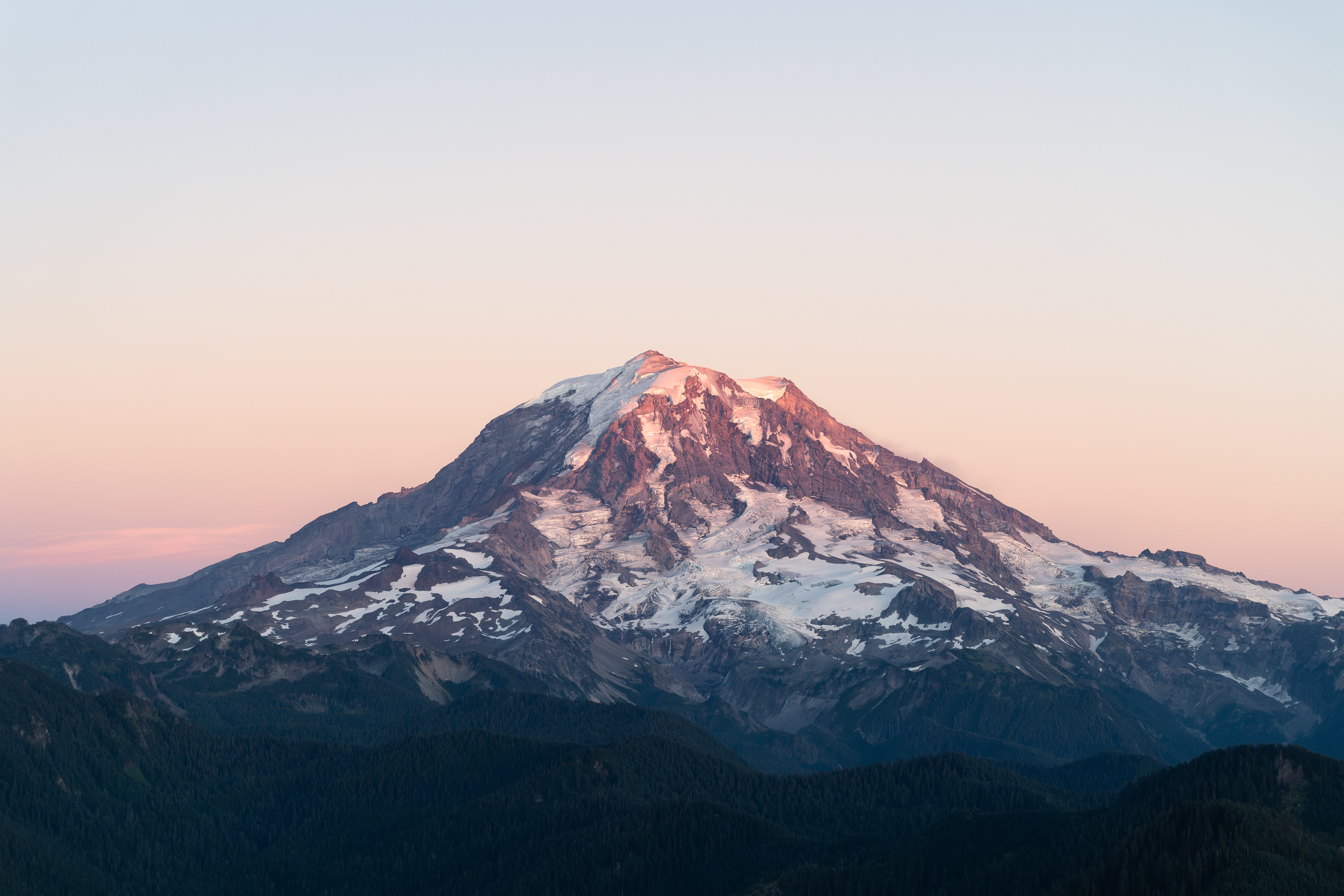
Mount Rainier is the second deadliest mountain in the United States (after Denali) and accounts for an estimated 7 percent of nationwide mountaineering deaths

This is a list of fatalities from mountaineering in Washington (state). It does not include deaths that occurred on a maintained hiking trail or non-alpine climbing areas. Deaths have occurred due to avalanches, rockfall, BASE jumping, failure of rappel anchors, and falls on steep terrain or into glacial crevasses.

As of 2026, Washington has more climbing accidents than any other state according to statistics kept by the American Alpine Club, with 2,134 accidents (including 378 fatalities) recorded since 1951.

== Central Cascades ==
=== I-90 ===
Climbing Mount Si in February

There were deadly falls from the Haystack (summit bloc) of Mount Si in June 1913, October 1972, February 1981, August 1982, August 2008, and May 2026. Although the mountain rarely receives enough snow for avalanches to occur, a climber died in a 2–3 feet (0.6–0.9 m) deep slab avalanche in February 1985. He experienced severe head trauma after hitting a tree and died after his partner left him to get assistance.

Nearby McClellan Butte has seen fatal falls, in 1972 and 1998 in a snow-covered gully that crosses the trail, and in 2005 near the rocky summit.

Granite Mountain in snowy conditions

There have been several deaths on Granite Mountain in snowy conditions:

- In April 1958, a teenager died after falling a long distance on a snow slope.
- In March 1962, two climbers died in a slab avalanche.
- In April 1984, a solo climber died in an avalanche.
- In April 2013, one man in a party of snowshoers was killed in a massive avalanche that ran around 1,200 feet (370 m).
- In March 2014, a backcountry skier died in an avalanche.
- On New Year's Eve 2015, a snowshoer went missing on the mountain—his body was recovered in avalanche debris a day later.

In 2011, a student fell and died on Kaleetan Peak.

There have been multiple deaths on Lundin Peak, which have led to memorials being installed on the route:

- In September 1952, a climber died after his rope broke during a rappel.
- In October 1980, a climber fell 600 feet (180 m) while descending unroped from the peak.
- In May 1982, a climber fell 450 metres (1,480 ft) to his death in another unroped fall.
- In September 1998, a climber died after a large rock broke loose. Right before the fall, he had remarked that the rock quality was "crap".

Nearby the Tooth has also had multiple climbing fatalities:

- In September 1957, a climber died after falling off a cliff in the dark a few miles from the Denny Creek Trailhead after summiting earlier that day.
- In 1977, a climber died after his protection ripped out in a fall.
- In August 2023, a climber fell while attempting to down climb the north ridge after successfully free soloing the more difficult south face.

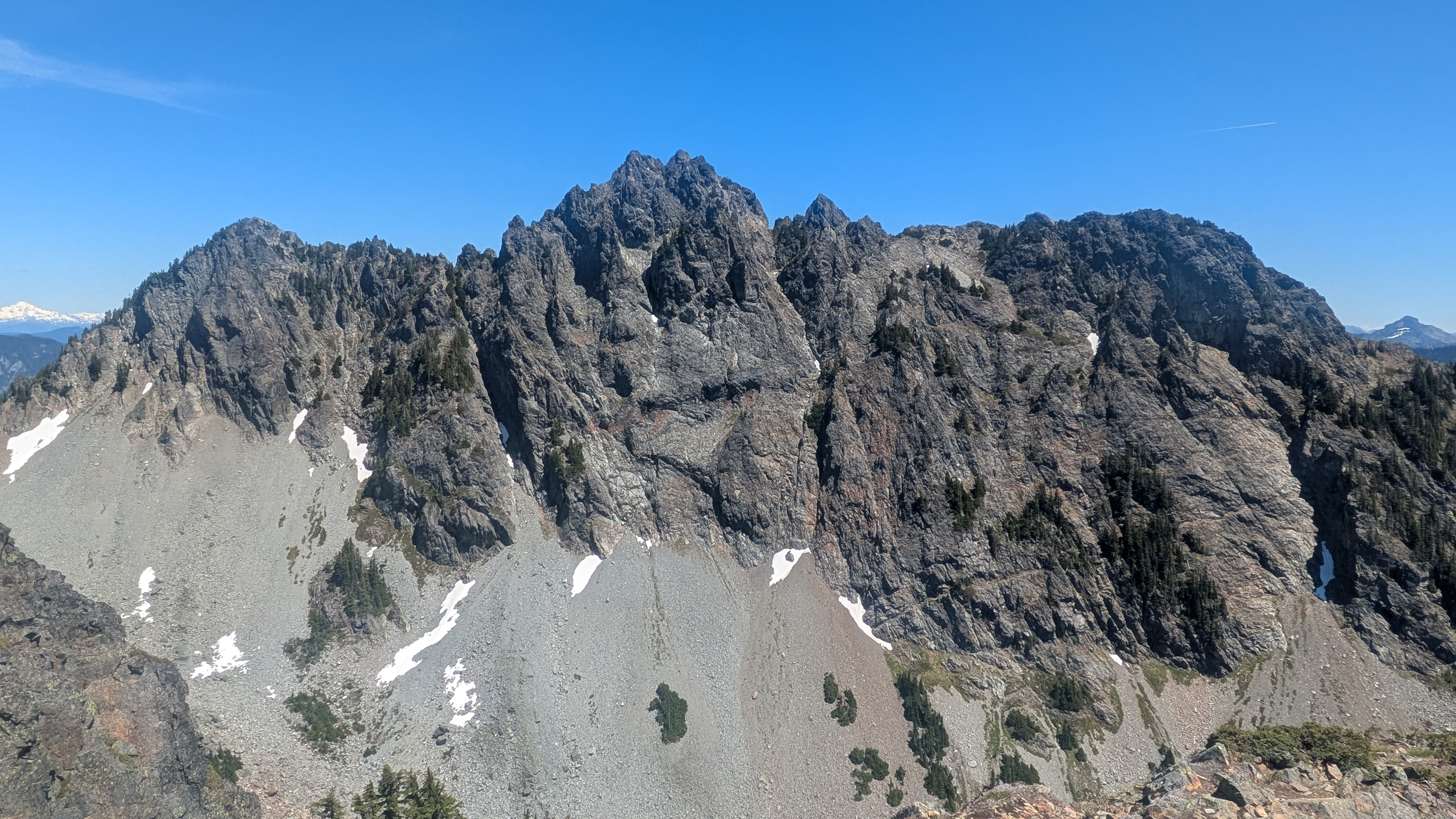
Chair Peak's west face

Across the valley, Chair Peak has had multiple fatalities:

- In February 1953 a backcountry skier was killed in an avalanche near Source Lake.
- In June 1984 a climber died on the Northeast Buttress climbing route after being struck by rockfall from a party above.
- In October 1993 a climber fell and died after dislodging a large rock.
- In September 2001, a climber fell 600 feet (180 m) down a 45 degree rock slope and died.
- In October 2008, there was a fatality from a fall.
- In October 2018 a climber fell and died. His body was recovered by King County Search and Rescue.

Guye Peak has seen multiple deaths:

- In September 1961, two climbers fell and died while ascending the west face of the mountain.
- In March 1972, a college climbing leader slipped on snow and fell off a cliff.
- In 2002, a climber was off route and fell 300 feet (91 m) off a cliff.
- In September 2008, mathematician Oded Schramm died in a fall near the summit.

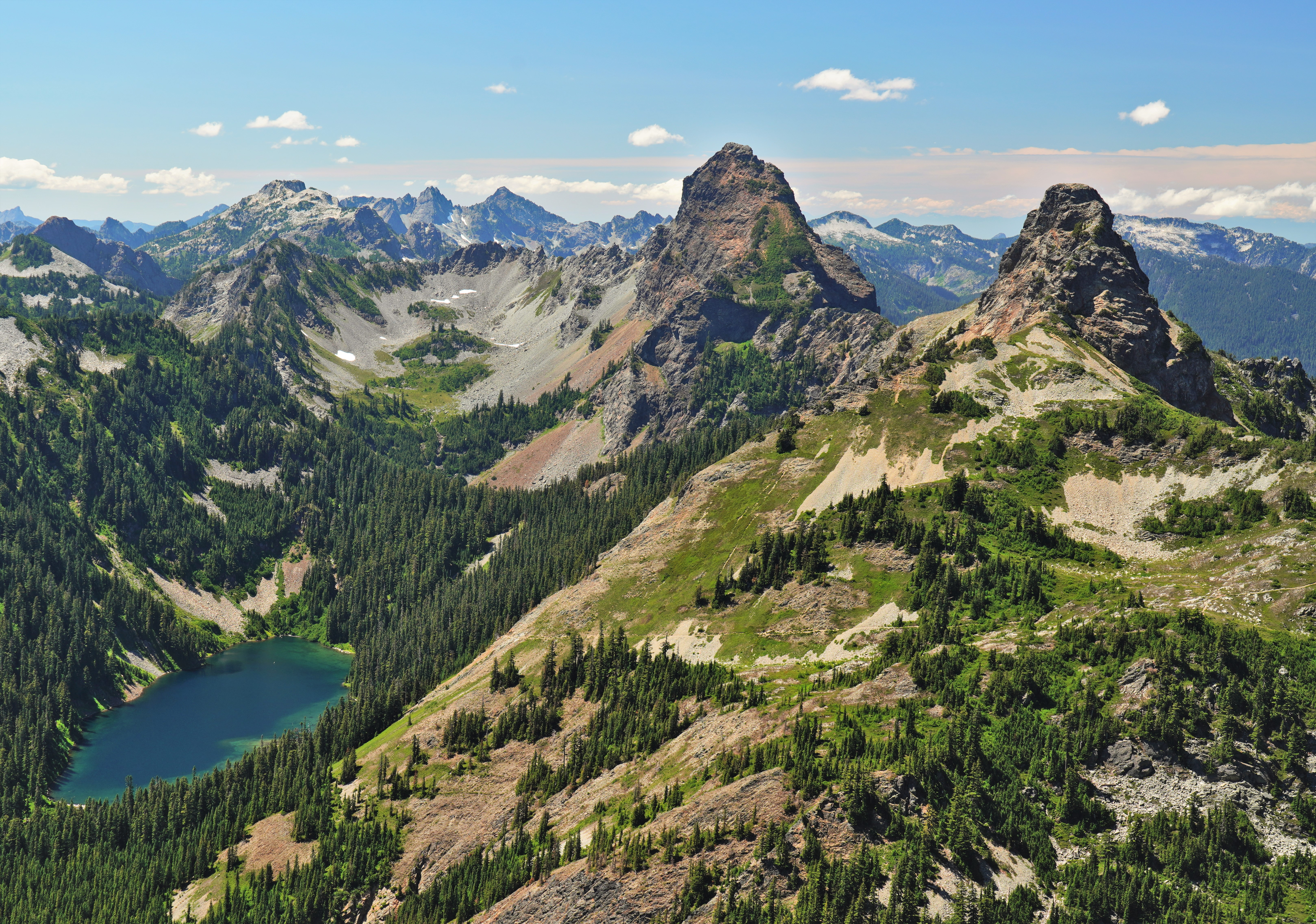
Mount Thomson (center)

There have been multiple fatalities on Mount Thomson:

- In September 1960, a climber dislodged a rock that hit another climber below him, causing him to fall. Although he survived the fall, he died shortly afterwards and before rescuers arrived.
- In September 1989, a climber fell 200 metres (660 ft) from just below the east ridge, dying instantly.
- In September 1996, a climber died after his rappel anchor failed.

Multiple deaths have occurred on Red Mountain:

- In January 2011, a solo skier died in an avalanche.
- In April 2017, another solo skier died in an avalanche while skiing on the mountain.

Mount Garfield, on the Middle Fork of the Snoqualmie River, has seen multiple fatal incidents:

- In May 1972, two climbers fell down the south gully. They might have been caught in an avalanche.
- In September 2014, a man fell and died from rappelling off the end of his rope on the descent from the "Infinite Bliss" climbing route..

In August 2019, Ann Nelson died in a fall on Iron Cap Mountain.

=== Highway 2 ===
Northeast face of Mount Index in April

Mount Index has also seen multiple fatalities:

- In October 1947, two climbers went missing while climbing Mount Index and were presumed dead.
- In June 1972, a climber died while rappelling down a waterfall, possibly of hypothermia or drowning.
- In July 1980, a climber fell the full length of his climbing rope (around 300 feet (91 m)) to his death on the north face of Mount Index.
- In February 1984, the bodies of two climbers who were trying to climb the couloir between Index's main and middle peak were located in a gully. The cause of their death was not known.

Mount Baring has seen several fatalities:

- In July 1953 a climber (who was a partner of Fred Beckey) fell 180 feet (55 m) off a cliff and died.
- In July 2004, a man died in a BASE jumping accident.
- In September 2020, a man died in a BASE jumping accident.
- In August 2025, a man died in a BASE jumping accident.

=== Stuart Range ===
There have been several deaths on Colchuck Peak:

- In June 1992, two experienced climbers fell to their deaths while rock climbing on the Northeast Buttress.
- In November 2015, a climber went missing on Colchuck Peak; his body was found several months later.
- In March 2023, three climbers were killed in an avalanche on the northeast couloir, a steep snow climbing route.

In 1969 a climber fell off of Icicle Ridge above Ida Creek and tumbled 2,300 feet (700 m) to his death.

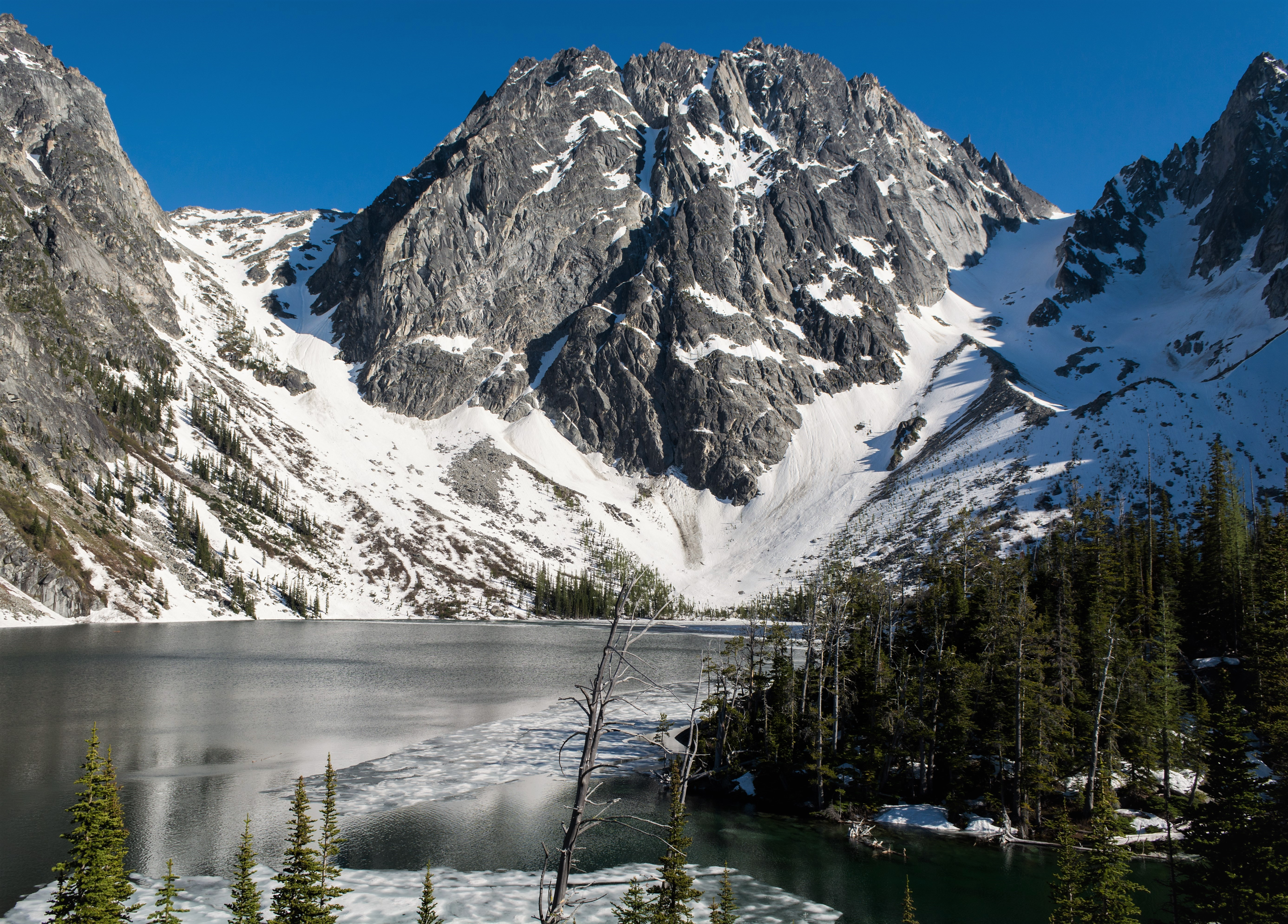
Dragontail Peak, Colchuck Lake

Numerous climbers have died near Dragontail Peak over the years:

- In January 1974, Don Heller died while descending from Asgard Pass.
- In January 1991, Hope Barns and Kathy Phibbs died from a fall on the Triple Couloirs ice climbing route.
- In 2007, Otto Vaclavek and his son Max were found dead near Dragontail Peak.
- In 2008, Andrea Basque died in a climbing accident.
- In June 2011, a climber died in after glissading into a waterfall hole below Aasgard Pass.
- In June 2016 another person died in a similar glissading incident.
- In June 2019 a teenager died after glissading into a waterfall hole below Aasgard Pass.
- In May 2021, Daniel J. Meer fell and died while climbing on the peak.
- In March 2022, Richard Thurmer was killed in a fall while attempting to solo climb the Triple Couloirs route.
- In September 2025, Andrew Wong fell and died near the summit of the mountain.

Mount Stuart with the Cascadian couloir visible to the right of the summit

Several people have died while climbing Mount Stuart:

- In June 1972, a climber fell into a moat and his companions were unable to extricate him, so he died of exposure.
- In October 1972, a climber died in a sizable rockfall in the gully above the Ice Cliff Glacier.
- In 1996, a climber died while attempting to glissade the Cascadian couloir on the south side of the peak.
- In June 2018, a man died near the false summit while attempting to descend the Cascadian couloir route.

In July 1979, a man died after a 130 feet (40 m) lead fall on Ingalls Peak. He initially survived with multiple broken bones but died in the almost two-day period it took rescuers to reach him and his climbing partner.

== South Cascades ==
Climbing the Worm Flows route on Mount Saint Helens

Multiple climbers have been killed from crevasse falls, avalanches, and cornice collapses on Mount Saint Helens:

- In September 1953, a boy died after an unroped crevasse fall on the Toutle glacier.
- In April 1975, five university students died in a large avalanche.
- In 1976, two climbers were found dead in a crevasse.
- In February 2010, a climber died after falling into the crater during a cornice collapse.
- In March 2024, a splitboarder died following a cornice collapse in which he was carried into the crater.

People climbing Mount Adams

Multiple people have been killed on Mount Adams:

- In September 1967, a Mazamas climbing leader died of pulmonary edema while climbing the mountain.
- In February 1974, two climbers fell off a cliff near the top of the Lyman Glacier. Both subsequently died.
- In September 1980, a solo climber fell and died.
- In November 1980, two climbers went missing in a winter storm. Their bodies were recovered in 2001.
- In August 1990, a climber slipped on snow and slid 1,000 feet (300 m) before falling into a crevasse on the Mazama Glacier.
- In May 2018, a climber fell 2,500 feet (760 m) near the main south ridge climbing route.

In May 1958, a climber took a lead fall on Chimney Rocks. His rope was severed.in the fall and he died around 30 minutes after impact.

In September 1968 a woman died during an unexpected storm on Old Snowy Mountain.

=== Rainier ===
Mount Rainier is the second deadliest mountain in the United States (after Denali) and accounts for an estimated 7 percent of nationwide mountaineering deaths. Most victims died of a fall, exposure, or avalanche.

Crevasses on the upper Ingraham Glacier

The most popular route, accounting for around 75 percent of climbers, on the mountain is the Disappointment Cleaver. Hazards on this route include rockfall, icefall, and traffic jams. An early season variation is the Ingraham Glacier direct.

- In September 1957, a climber died because of a collapsed snow bridge above the cleaver; he broke his neck in the fall.
- In August 1971, a climber died of skull fracture after being pulled into a crevasse.
- In September 1977, a climber died of injuries in a fall.
- In September 1978, two climbers died of hypothermia after a fall during the descent.
- In March 1979, Willi Unsoeld and another climber died after an avalanche near Cadaver Gap.
- In June 1981, eleven climbers died in a serac fall on the Ingraham Glacier, which is the largest mountaineering mass casualty incident in the United States.
- In September 1983, two climbers died in a fall off of the cleaver.
- In May 1991, a climber took a fall into a crevasse around 12,500 feet (3,800 m) and died of exposure.
- In September 1991, two climbers died in separate fall incidents.
- In June 1998, a climber died of exposure following an avalanche on the cleaver that took out two rope teams.
- In August 2001, a climber died of a suspected heart attack.
- In June 2002, two climbers were found dead on the Ingraham Direct route around 12,500 feet (3,800 m).
- In September 2002, a climber was killed by rockfall.
- In October 2004, a climber was buried and died in an avalanche while exploring a crevasse on the Ingraham Glacier.
- In June 2010, eleven climbers were caught in an avalanche and one went missing, presumed dead.
- In August 2022, a climber fell and died on the Disappointment Cleaver.
- In May 2023, a climber with a guided group died near the summit.
- In June 2023, an elderly climber was found dead on the Ingraham Direct route.
- In July 2026, a climber was hit by a fatal rockfall on the cleaver.

Another popular route on the mountain is the Emmons Glacier:

- In January 1936, a solo climber was found dead after summiting.
- In May 1983 a man died in a crevasse fall.
- In June 1987, a climber died in an 80 feet (24 m) crevasse fall after a snow bridge broke.
- In June 1992, a climber died in a crevasse fall on the Emmons after summiting via Liberty Ridge.
- In August 1995, two NPS staff were killed while attempting to rescue a climber with a broken ankle.
- In July 2010, a climber died after falling into a crevasse.
- In June 2012, a climbing ranger died in a 2,700 feet (820 m) fall while attempting to rescue a climber.
- In July 2017, a skier fell to his death in a crevasse around 12,800 feet (3,900 m).

This photo was taken while searching for missing climbers on Liberty Ridge

Although it accounts for comparatively few climbers, the Liberty Ridge is responsible for a quarter of fatalities:

- In June 1968, a climber died around 13,000 feet (4,000 m) due to high altitude pulmonary edema.
- In May 1981, two climbers died in a fall around 10,000 feet (3,000 m).
- In July 1981, a climber died of unknown causes after being separated from his partner.
- In October 1984, a climber died on the route.
- In June 1987, two climbers were found dead in their tent, around 13,000 feet (4,000 m) elevation. It was suspected they might have died of suffocation after a snowstorm dropped multiple feet of snow on their tent.
- In May 1988, three climbers died in a fall.
- In May 1989 two climbers were found dead after apparently falling off the route.
- In May 1998, a skier died in a fall while descending Liberty Ridge.
- In May 2002, three climbers were found dead after being caught in severe weather.
- In May 2004, a climber died of injuries during a rescue attempt.
- In June 2004, one climber was killed and another sustained hand injuries.
- Also in June 2004, two climbers went missing on the route and were subsequently found dead.
- In June 2011, a climber died on the route.
- In May 2014, six climbers and guides were killed on Liberty Ridge, possibly due to an avalanche.
- In June 2015, the body of a missing climber was found near the crater rim at the top of the route.
- In May 2019, one climber was killed and two injured in a rockfall incident. The entire party required helicopter evacuation.
- In June 2020, a man fell to his death while attempting to ski Liberty Ridge. He was found dead in a crevasse at the bottom of the route.

The Gibraltar Ledges used to be the most popular route but fell out of favor due to rockfall hazard.

- In August 1909 two climbers vanished in a storm.
- In September 1916 a climber died a few days after a crevasse fall.
- In July 1924 a man was killed by a skull fracture from rockfall onto the ledges.
- In July 1929, two climbers died after falling on an icy 45-degree slope near Camp Comfort. After the incident, guides fixed ropes and improved footing along the route.
- In July 2010, a climber untied from his rope team while climbing the Gibraltar Ledges route in low visibility conditions and disappeared.

View of the Fuhrer Finger and Wilson Glacier

The Fuhrer Finger is another route up a snow couloir on the south side of the mountain that is a classic ski descent route, crossing the Wilson and Nisqually glaciers. All fatalities in that area are listed below:

- In June 1924 a man was killed by rockfall near the terminus of the Nisqually Glacier.
- In July 1931, a climber fell and slid 1 mile (1.6 km) on ice into a crevasse and died on the upper Nisqually Glacier.
- In May 1978, three climbers died due to an avalanche in the finger around 12,500 feet (3,800 m).
- In March 1992, two climbers were found dead in avalanche debris below the finger around 8,400 feet (2,600 m). It is believed they died due to an avalanche in the Fuhrer Finger.
- In May 2011, a skier died in a crevasse fall on the Nisqually Glacier.
- In January 2026, two climbers were found dead on the Wilson Glacier. They might have been trying to climb the Fuhrer Finger route.

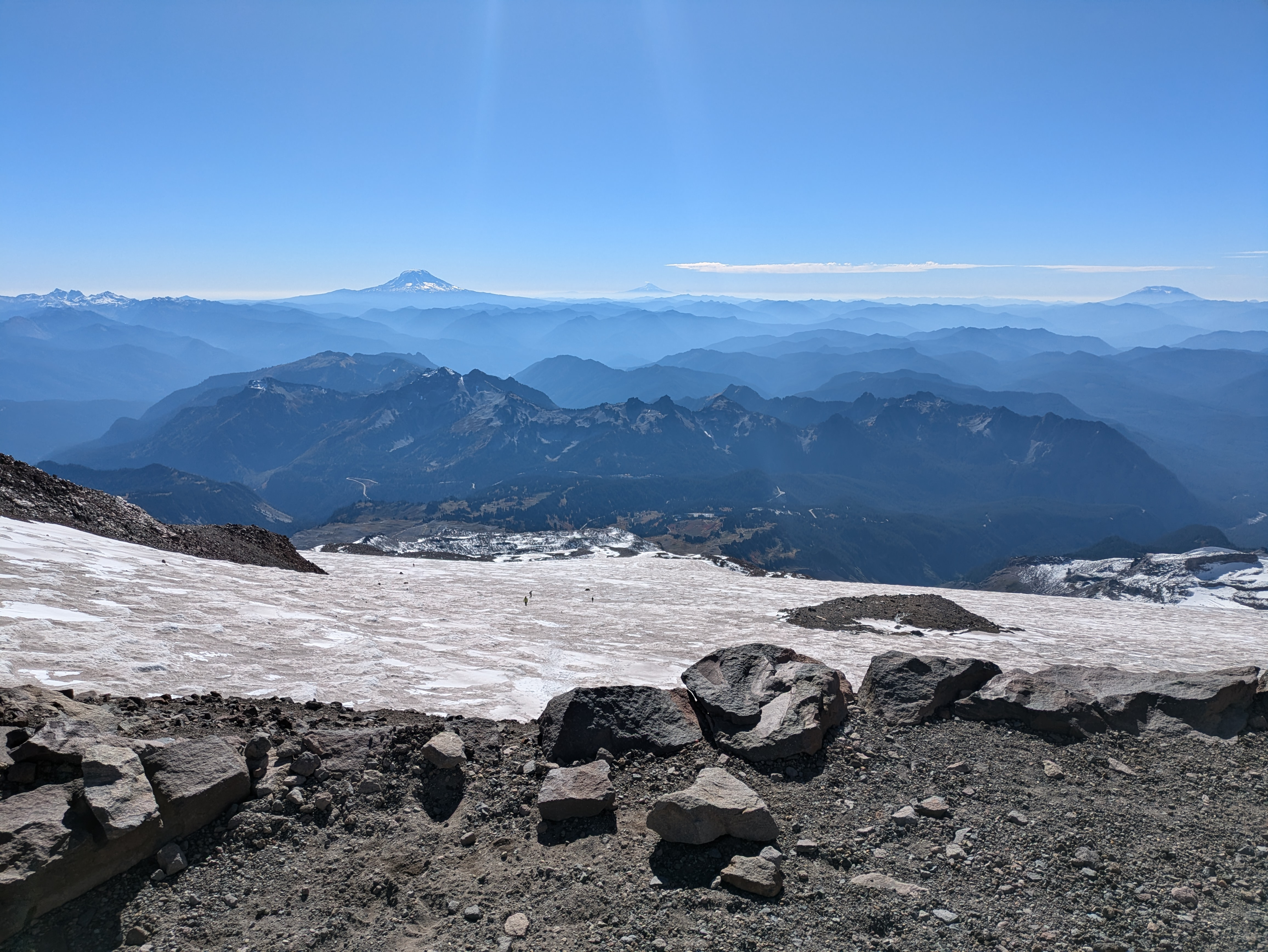
View down the snowfield from Camp Muir

Despite being viewed as a casual hike, many people have died in the terrain between Paradise and Camp Muir.

- In July 1897, University of Oregon geographer Edward McClure fell and died while descending at night from the summit. It is believed he died near the rock that bears his name below the Muir Snowfield.
- In August 1917, a climber died in an unroped fall on the Paradise Glacier.
- In February 1932, a skier was killed in an avalanche near Paradise.
- In April 1940, Sigurd Hall died near Anvil Rock while competing in the Silver Skis Race (which descended from Camp Muir to Paradise).
- In November 1957 a boy went missing on the snowfield.
- In June 1960 a teenager died in Edith Creek basin during a glissade, but accounts differ whether he fell into a crevasse, waterfall, or off a cliff.
- In September 1967 a man and his nephew got off route while descending from Camp Muir in poor weather and fell into a crevasse on the Paradise Glacier.
- In June 1968 a man died of hypothermia during an unplanned bivouac near Anvil Rock.
- In March 1969, a man died of an avalanche near Panorama Point.
- In May 1973 a person died in Edith Creek Basin due to sledding off a waterfall.
- In November 1975 a skier died in an avalanche near Paradise.
- In February 1976 a person died in a sledding accident near Paradise.
- In December 1977, a climber died in a fatal avalanche near Panorama Point.
- In August 1981, a climber died of a heart attack during a summit bid.
- In July 1982, a woman died in a fall in Edith Creek basin.
- In May 1983, a man died after falling off a cornice on the Muir Snowfield.
- In October 1990, a skier went missing on the Muir Snowfield around 8,000 feet (2,400 m) elevation.
- In January 1991, a skier died after taking a 1,000 feet (300 m) fall off a cliff.
- In May 1999, a climber went missing on the Muir Snowfield.
- In June 1999, a snowboarder went missing somewhere near Camp Muir. The search was called off several days later without finding his body.
- In September 1999, a man went missing on the Muir Snowfield. His body was eventually found to the southeast, at an icefall near the intersection of the Paradise and Cowlitz Glacier.
- In November 1999, two climbers went missing on the Muir Snowfield. A search was suspended after some of the rescuers were injured.
- In May 2005, two hikers were found dead on the Muir Snowfield. It was theorized that they had stopped moving during a sudden whiteout and blizzard and died of exposure.
- In December 2007, a snowshoer died in an avalanche near Paradise. His body was recovered three days later.
- In June 2008, a man died at Camp Muir after surviving an unplanned night on the snowfield in a blizzard. Two others survived but had hypothermia and frostbite.
- In December 2011 a man was found dead high in the Stevens Creek drainage.
- In January 2012 four people went missing in two parties on January 15 and 16; one planned to camp on the Muir Snowfield and the other intended to climb to the summit. One body was eventually found on the Muir Snowfield and two others on the Paradise Glacier.
- In July 2012, a park visitor fell through a snow bridge into Edith Creek while glissading and died of drowning.
- In December 2014, a missing snowshoer was found dead in the Edith Creek area.
- In July 2017, a skier died after falling through a snow bridge into running water near Pebble Creek.
- In March 2018, a missing snowshoer was found dead in the Nisqually drainage below Paradise. He had been last seen on the Muir Snowfield.
- In July 2019, a man was found dead at the base of the Nisqually Chutes; he had told others that he had planned a conditioning hike in the Pebble Creek area.
- In March 2020, a woman was found dead on the Muir Snowfield.
- In September 2020, a man was found dead after a storm on the Muir Snowfield.
- In May 2024, a skier was killed in a 200 feet (61 m) fall near Pebble Creek.

Other climbers have died in other areas:

- In January 1907, three mine workers were killed in an avalanche in Glacier Basin below the Emmons Glacier.
- In August 1911, a climber vanished during a solo ascent of the Success Cleaver.
- In August 1915 a climber was killed by rockfall on the Cowlitz Cleaver.
- In August 1941, a climber died of exposure after falling into a crevasse on the Carbon Glacier or Russell Glacier.
- In August 1954 a climber died because of an uncontrolled glissade into a crevasse near Meany Crest.
- In September 1959, a scientist died at the summit of the mountain.
- In June 1969, a man died of rockfall on Curtis Ridge.
- In July 1969, two climbers died of crevasse falls on the Winthrop Glacier.
- In November 1973, a climber died in an avalanche on the Success Cleaver.
- In August 1975, a climber died in a rockfall on the Central Mowitch Face.
- In February 1977, a climber died while trying to glissade on the Pyramid Glacier.
- In July 1977, a man died in a crevasse fall on the Winthrop Glacier.
- In September 1979, a man died after glissading into a crevasse on the Inter Glacier.
- In August 1995, two climbers died in a crevasse fall on the Winthrop Glacier. Rangers blamed hazardous late season conditions.
- In August 2005, a climber went missing high on the Wapowety Cleaver.

In 2023, climbing rangers noted an increase in skiing-related incidents due to the increased popularity of skiing on the mountain and reduced average skill level of participants. They warned that "The vast majority of terrain on Mount Rainier can be classified as “no fall” territory."

=== Tatoosh Range ===
François E. Matthes and Edith Matthes on Pinnacle Peak in August 1911

There have been multiple deaths on Pinnacle Peak:

- In August 1912, a climber was standing on an exposed ledge when she leaned over and lost her balance, falling an estimated 800 feet (240 m). The YMCA group she was with blamed her death on a dizzy spell. This was one of the first fatalities in the new national park.
- In July 1970, a guide with RMI died during a solo climb of Pinnacle Peak. Lou Whittaker, who noted that the mountain was composed of brittle volcanic rock, found the deceased guide in a pile of boulders at the base of the cliff.
- In October 1993, a climber fell around 250–300 feet (76–91 m) and died while descending from the mountain.

In March 1988 a skier died in an avalanche near Plummer Peak.

Multiple people have died in falls from Unicorn Peak:

- In August 1924 a climber and mountain guide fell and died after a rock broke off. He initially fell 12 feet (3.7 m) but then tumbled hundreds of feet further.
- In July 1988, two climbers on Unicorn Peak were route finding when one dislodged a rock that caused him to fall off the mountain, tumbling to his death 60 feet (18 m) below.

Eagle Peak has seen multiple deaths:

- In October 2004, a climber fell and died.
- In June 2007, a hiker was found dead after falling around 200 feet (61 m).

=== Other mountains in Mount Rainier National Park ===
In August 1919 a Mazamas climbing expedition lost a member when a ledge gave way on Little Tahoma. He fell over 500 feet (150 m) into a crevasse far below.

There have been multiple fatal incidents on Mount Wow, a steep, trailless mountain in the western side of the park:

- In July 1937, a teenager fell down a snow slope on and subsequently drowned in a creek.
- In June 1973, a solo climber experienced a fatal fall.

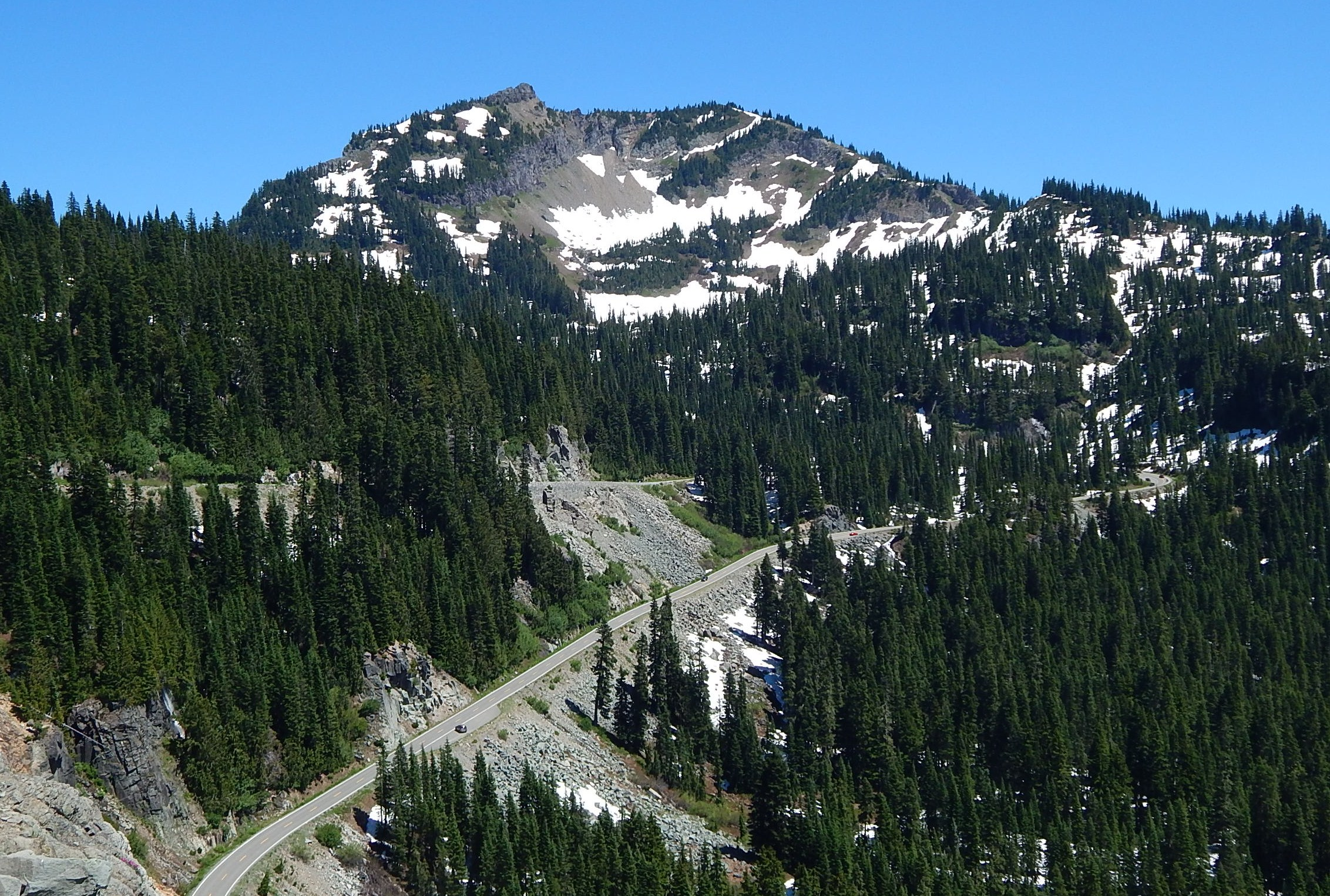
Naches Peak seen from Highway 410 switchbacks between Cayuse and Chinook passes, Mount Rainier National Park.

There have been multiple deaths on Naches Peak near Chinook Pass:

- In August 1951, a climber wearing sandals went off route and died in a 200 feet (61 m) fall.
- In October 1987, a climber fell due to crumbling rock and slid off a cliff to his death.

In August 1968 a naval officer fell around 200 feet (61 m) down a steep talus slope on Mother Mountain and died. According to rescuers, the party was inexperienced and inadequately equipped despite being in quite challenging terrain.

In August 1977, a man slipped, fell 200 feet (61 m), and died from head trauma on Faraway Rock.

Sluiskin Mountain (in the northwestern part of the national park) has seen multiple fatal incidents:

- In October 1978, a climber was hit by rockfall from another party member; she fell 50 feet (15 m) and died.
- In September 2015 a climber fell during a descent and died. A peakbagger, he had just climbed the 99th of 100 Peaks in Mount Rainier National Park challenge.

In July 2019, a climber died in a fall from Barrier Peak.

In June 1977 a man died near the Cowlitz Chimneys, but his body was not recovered until 1984.

== North Cascades ==
In August 1988, a climber was killed on Mount Triumph.

In May 2025, three climbers fell and died on North Early Winter Spire after a single piton that they were using as a rappel anchor pulled out.

In September 2014, a climber fell and died after rappelling off the end of his rope on Le Petit Cheval.

In 1991, a climber died after being hit by rockfall on Goode Mountain.

Twin Sisters Mountain

There have been multiple deaths in the Twin Sisters:

- In June 2014, a climber fell and died on North Twin.
- In September 2025, a climber was on North Twin when he fell around 250 feet (76 m) and died instantly.
- In June 2026, a climber fell and died on the north face of South Twin.

In August 2022, a man went missing on McMillan Spire; despite a weeklong search and rescue operation, he was not found. His family and friends founded an event in his honor where participants run between Dick's Drive-Ins to fund local search and rescue groups.

In July 2025, an experienced climber died on Mount Fury after a rock broke off.

In March 2022, an experienced mountain guide died in an unroped fall on Colonial Peak.

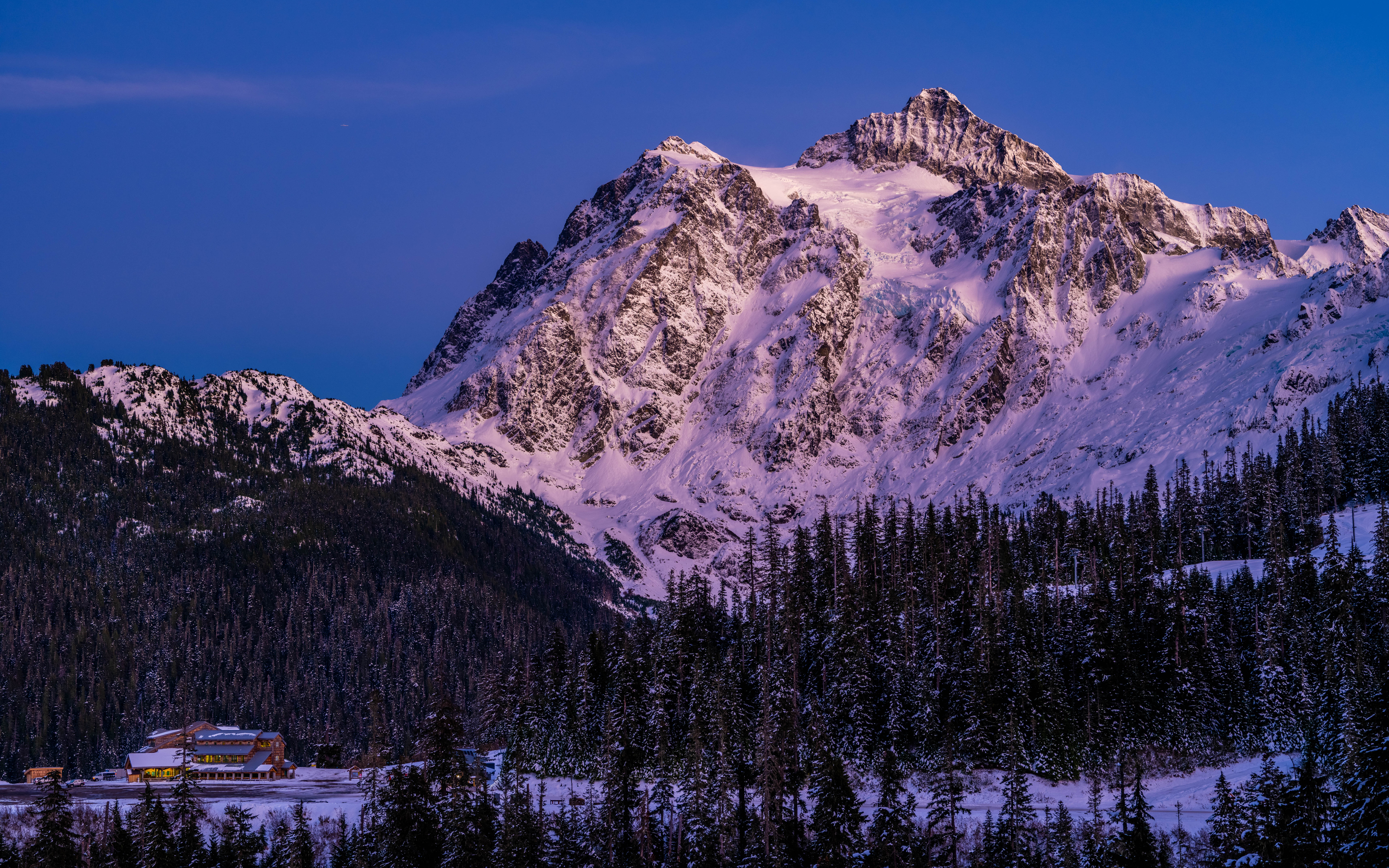
Looking at the Fisher Chimneys route on Shuksan from the Mount Baker ski area

Multiple climbers have died on Mount Shuksan:

- In May 1972, a friend of Bill Gates died at the age of 17 in a fatal fall on snow on the Fisher Chimneys route.
- In July 1980, a climber fell 200 feet (61 m) and died on the Fisher Chimneys route.
- In June 1982, a climber fell to his death on a steep snow slope.
- In June 1983, two climbers died from an avalanche on the Price Glacier when they were carried off a cliff.
- In September 2000, a climber died of injuries after slipping on a snow slope on the Fisher Chimneys route.
- In May 2014, a skier died after being carried away by an avalanche and falling 2,000 feet (610 m).
- In August 2024, human remains from a missing climber were found near his tent on the Fisher Chimneys route.

In September 2010, prolific climber Dallas Kloke died after pulling a loose block on the Pleiades, an obscure mountain near Mount Larrabee.

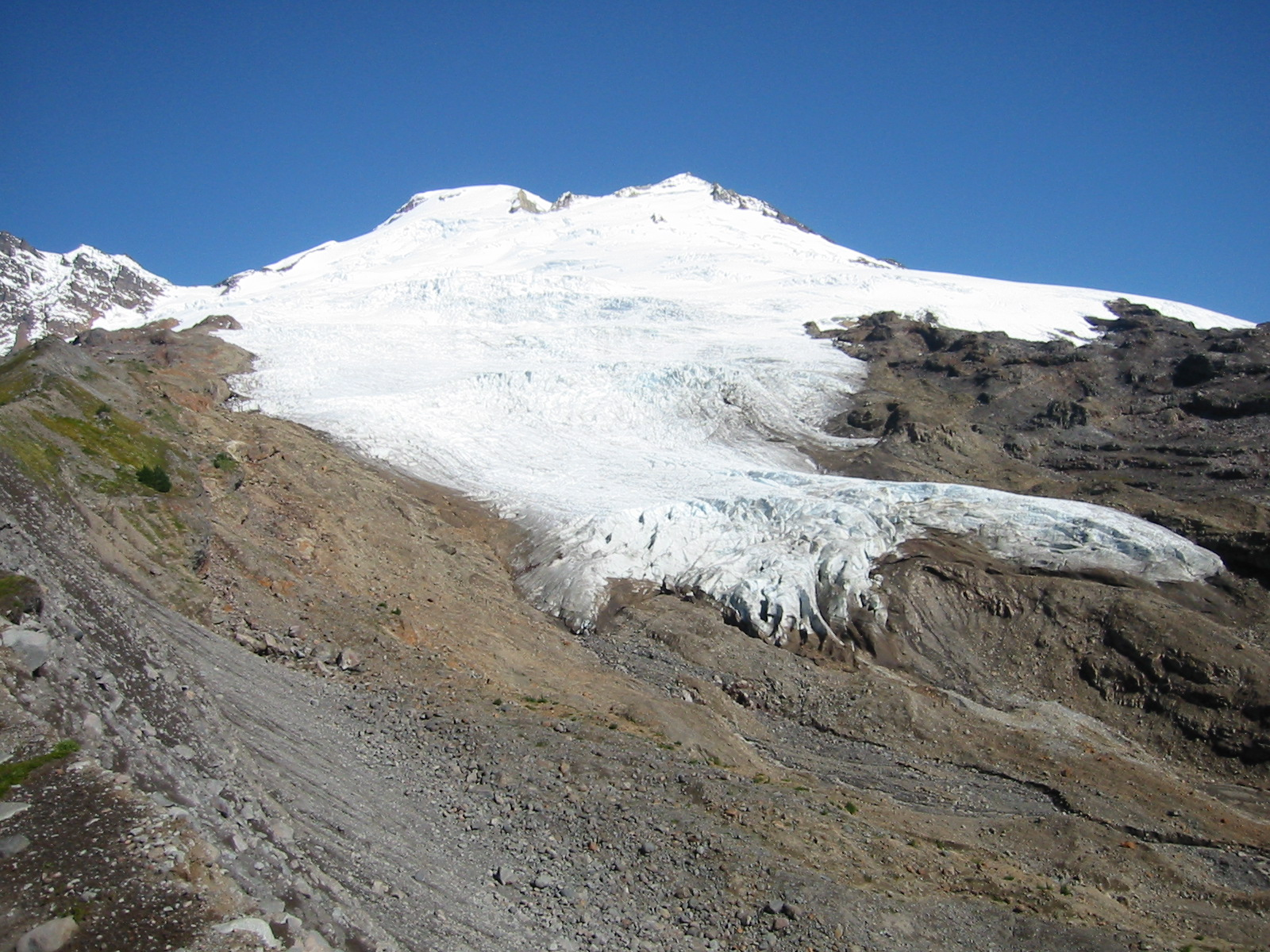
Easton Glacier on Baker

Numerous climbers have died on Mount Baker:

- In 1939, six climbers from Western Washington University were killed in a large avalanche.
- In November 1962 a skier fell and was injured. Rescue did not reach her until 45 hours later at which point she was dead.
- In May 1974, a climber died from exposure after an unplanned bivy on the mountain.
- In June 1974, four climbers were hit by an avalanche and carried into a crevasse. Two died from injuries, while the other two survived.
- In July 1979, a climber died of hypothermia after a crevasse fall; his companions were unable to extricate him.
- In October 1979, a climber died after falling into a crevasse on the Coleman Glacier.
- In August 1986, two climbers from a guided party died after being struck by icefall.
- In 2001, four climbers fell into a crevasse on the Coleman Glacier and one died from his injuries.
- In June 2008, a man died after being crushed by a boulder and trapped underneath.
- In July 2011, a woman died after falling into a moat while glissading down the Coleman Headwall route.
- In 2018, a US military service member was killed after falling into a crevasse on the Sholes Glacier.
- In September 2024, a solo climber was found dead after falling into a bergschrund on the Coleman–Deming route.

In September 1984, a climber fell and died off the descent trail from Nooksack Tower in the early morning after a successful summit.

=== Cascade River Road ===
In July 1986 and May 1987, two climbers were fatally injured in rockfall incidents on Mixup Peak.

In August 1959, a climber died after being struck by rock on the descent from Johannesburg Mountain.

In July 1988, a woman fell around 100–120 metres (330–390 ft) while climbing Magic Mountain. She died after around 20 minutes without regaining consciousness.

In June 1986, a climber was killed in a fall on The Triad.

On 10 July 2005, three climbers fell and died on Sharkfin Tower when their rappel anchor failed.

In July 2008, a woman fell 35 feet (11 m) on Klawatti Peak. She initially survived the fall but succumbed to her injuries before she could be rescued.

In August 2009, an experienced mountain guide died after being struck by falling ice on Mount Torment.

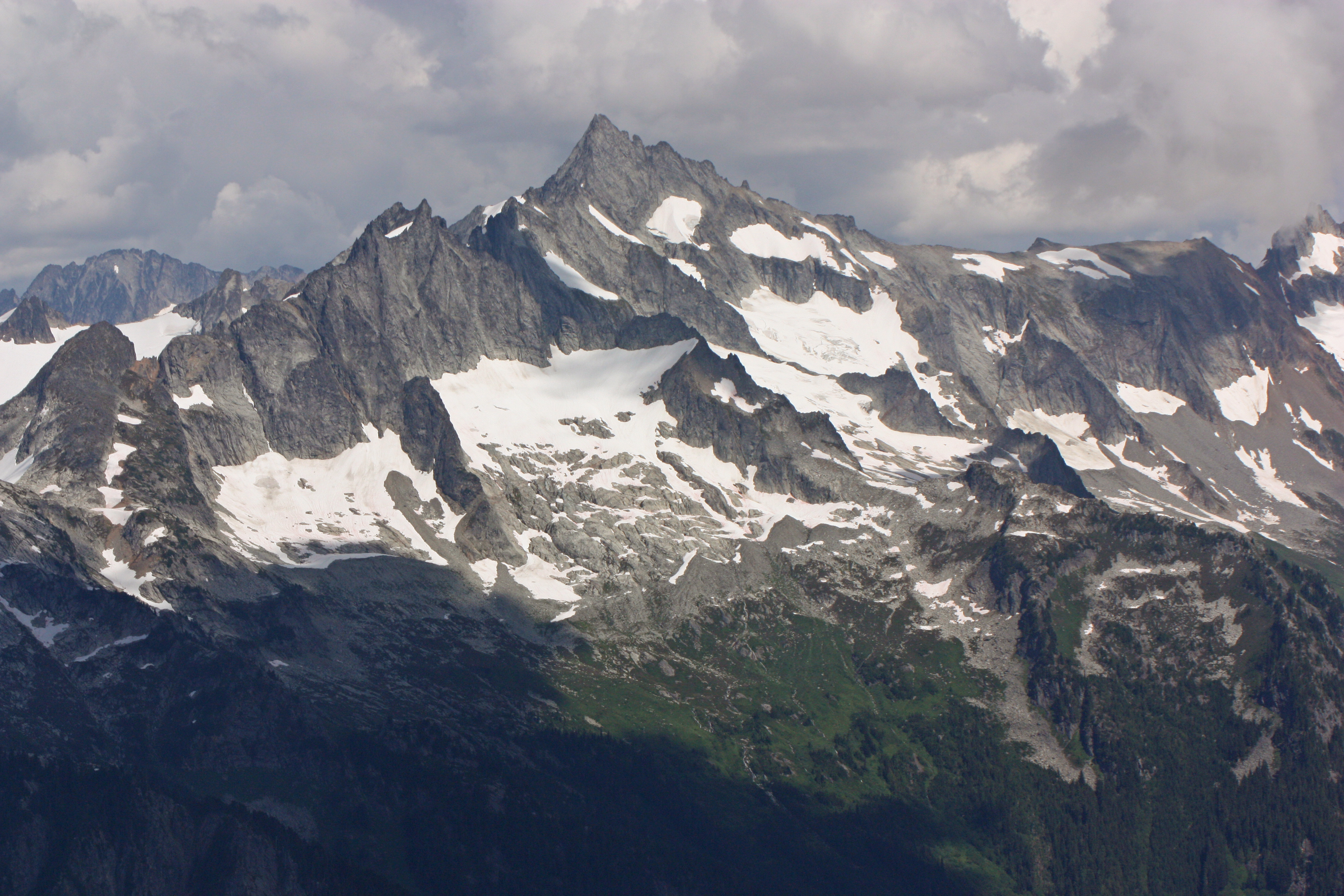
Forbidden Peak

There have been several fatalities on Forbidden Peak:

- In August 1957, a climber slipped on snow, fell into a bergschrund, and died before rescue could arrive.
- In July 1975, an inexperienced climber slipped and fell, ending up in a crevasse on the glacier, after getting off route.
- In September 2013, a climber died after being hit by rockfall while pulling his rope.
- In July 2017, a climber died after rappelling off the end of her rope.
- In August 2018, a climber died in an unroped fall from wet slabs.

There have been multiple fatalities on Hidden Lake Peak:

- In October 2019, a woman went missing during a snowstorm. Her body was found in September 2021.
- In May 2021, a man went missing in the Hidden Lake area and his body was found in July.

=== Mountain Loop Highway ===
Mount Pilchuck seen from Lake Stevens area

There have been several fatalities on Mount Pilchuck:

- In June 1990, two teenagers fell and died trying to shortcut the hiking trail.
- In March 2005, a hiker slid on snow 200 feet (61 m) from the north side of the mountain.
- In January 2008, a teenager died in an avalanche on the north side of the mountain.
- In September 2011, a man fell 300 feet (91 m) off a cliff from the north side of the mountain.
- In October 2015, a man fell 400 feet (120 m) near the lookout tower.

In two separate incidents in August 2022 and June 2026, people have fallen and died on Mount Pugh.

In August 1985, a climber was killed by falling ice on the northeast side of White Chuck Mountain.

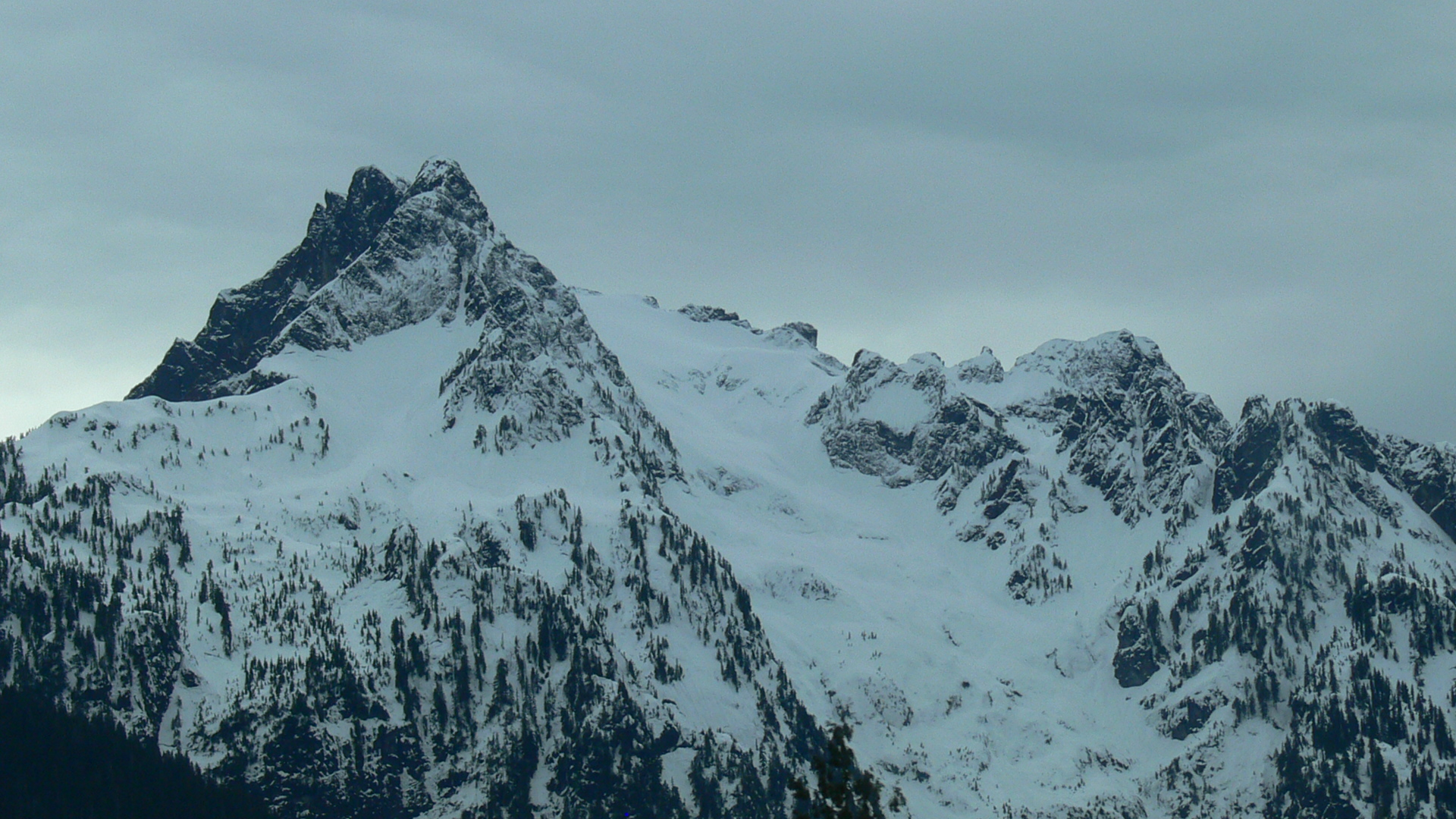
Whitehorse Mountain from Darrington, looking at the climbing route

Multiple people have died on Whitehorse Mountain:

- In May 1960 a Washington Alpine Club climber suffered a fatal injury when soft snow at the edge of a moat collapsed under his weight, causing a 400 feet (120 m) fall.
- In 1979, a climber died from exposure after being injured, despite extensive rescue attempts. The situation was later adapted into the made for tv movie High Ice.
- In May 1985, a climber died after being buried in an avalanche.

Del Campo Peak has seen multiple fatalities:

- In September 1993, a climber fell 140 feet (43 m) and died after the rock she grabbed dislodged from the mountain.
- In August 2024, a climber fell 40–50 feet (12–15 m) to his death. His body was recovered by Snohomish County sheriff and search and rescue.

Multiple climbers have died on Sloan Peak:

- In August 1972, a solo climber went missing during a climb and was never found.
- In July 1980, a climber suffered a fatal fall a few hundred feet from the summit.

In September 2020, a climber fell into a glacial hole near Kololo Peaks, south of Glacier Peak.

There have been multiple fatalities on Glacier Peak:

- In July 1967, a man attempted to glissade during the descent. He fell around 800 feet (240 m) and died shortly thereafter.
- In July 1991, a man died after an unroped fall into a crevasse on the Sitkum Glacier in a whiteout, around 1,500 feet (460 m) below the summit.

There have been multiple fatalities on Lewis Peak:

- In May 2006, a climber died in a fall.
- In January 2014, a climber triggered a cornice failure that set off a D3 loose wet avalanche; he fell 2,450 feet (750 m) vertically and was found dead by Everett Mountain Rescue.

In May 1962, a climber was carried 1,300 feet (400 m) in an avalanche on Hall's Peak. Although he survived the fall, he died during the attempted self-rescue.

Multiple climbers have died on Morning Star Peak:

- In June 1988, a climber died in a fall on an icy slope. Rescuers who found his body estimated he had fallen around 60 metres (200 ft) over a cliff.
- In December 2010, a climber died in an avalanche.

In January 2010 a woman fell and died while snowshoeing near Headlee Pass.

In August 1988 a climber died on the descent from Dome Peak after a rock gave way under him, struck him during a fall that carried him an estimated 75–125 metres (246–410 ft) vertical. Despite the application of CPR he died without regaining consciousness.

In July 1997, a climber slipped on snow on Columbia Peak and sustained a fatal head injury.

== Olympics ==
In July 1950 a Boy Scout died in a fall on snow on Mount Carey.

In July 1988, a climber died, likely of hypothermia, after falling into a crevasse on Bogachiel Peak.

In July 1995, a man fell on a snow slope near the "Terrible Traverse" on Mount Constance and died from his injuries.

In July 1995 and July 1996, two climbers fell and died on Mount Deception.

Also in July 1995, a climber fell and died on Mount Lincoln.

In September 1996, a climber fell around 200 feet (61 m) on the east side of Mount Cruiser to his death.

In June 1994 and May 2003, climbers died on Mount Washington.

In July 2022 a man's body was recovered from Mount Mystery.

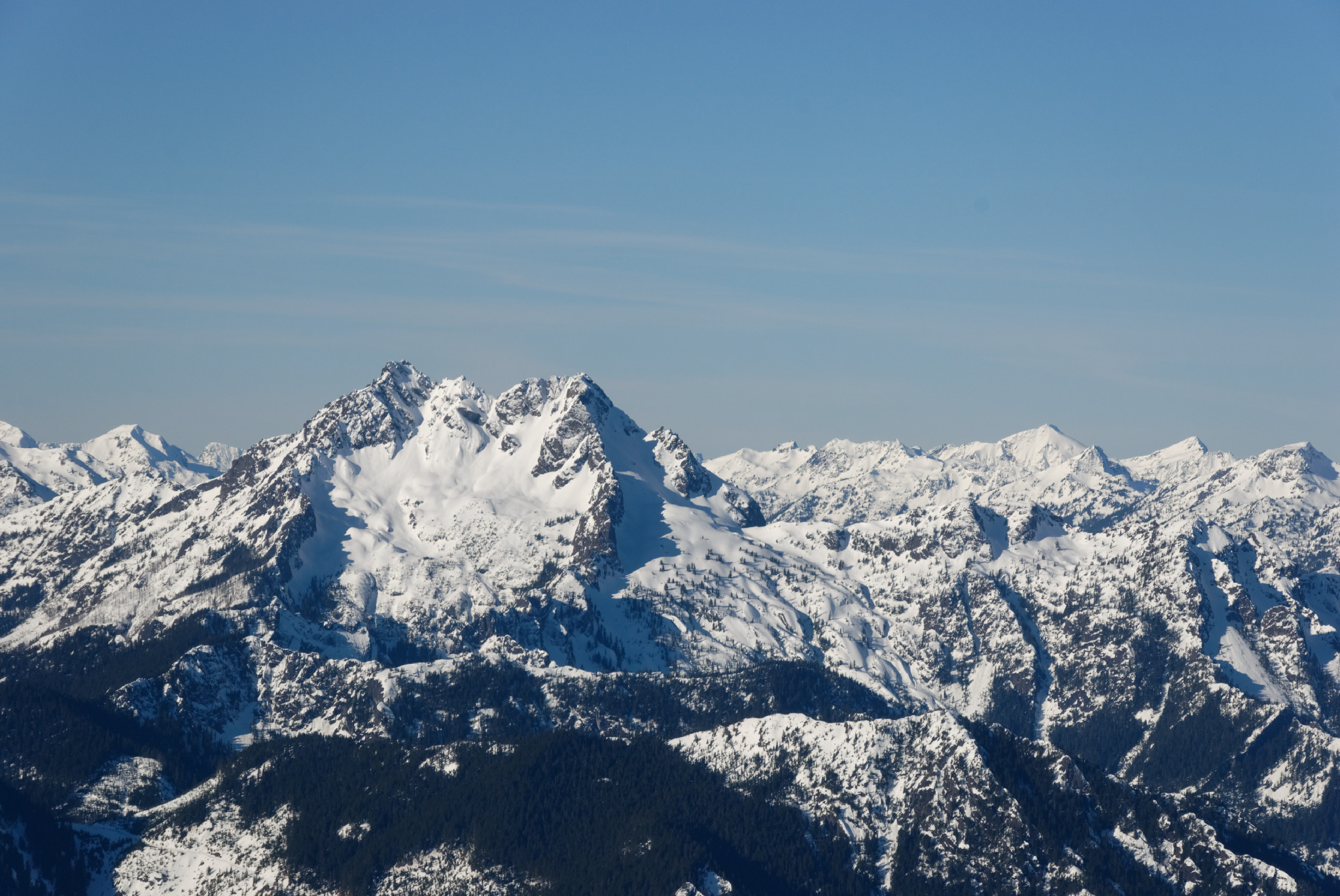
The Brothers

Multiple climbers have died on The Brothers:

- In September 1948, a climber died in a fall — his body recovery was the first major mission for Seattle Mountain Rescue.
- In June 1972, a climber died in a fall on snow and rock.
- In April 1986, a climber died after being struck by a 60 centimetres (24 in) wide rock that caused him to fall 150 metres (490 ft) on a snow slope, hitting some rocks on the way down. He was not wearing a helmet.
- In May 2021, a climber fell and died.

Mount Olympus has seen multiple fatalities:

- In August 1954, a climber died of exposure after his partners were unable to extricate him from a crevasse.
- In 1993, a climber fell and died in a crevasse while glissading on the Blue Glacier.
- In 2013, a climber fell from the summit bloc and died.

== Eastern Washington ==
In September 1985 two climbers died while rock climbing on Klockman Rock. It was speculated that loose rock had contributed to their demise.

In May 1969 a climber died on Tower Mountain after a piton pulled out in a lead fall.
