= Black Sturgeon River =

Black Sturgeon River may refer to:

- Black Sturgeon River (Kenora District), Ontario, Canada
- Black Sturgeon River (Thunder Bay District), Ontario, Canada

== See also ==
- Little Black Sturgeon River, Kenora District, Ontario, Canada
