= Source Lake (Kenora District) =

- Location of Source Lake in Ontario
- Location: Kenora, Ontario, Canada
- Coordinates: 49°48′54″N 94°08′51″W
- Type: Lake
- Part of: Nelson River drainage basin
- Max. length: 580 m (1,900 ft)
- Max. width: 320 m (1,050 ft)
- Surface elevation: 380 m (1,250 ft)

Source Lake is a lake in the Nelson River drainage basin in the Unorganized part of Kenora District in Northwestern Ontario, Canada.

The lake is about 500 metres (1,640 ft) long and 140 metres (459 ft) wide, lies at an elevation of 380 metres (1,247 ft), and is located about 25 kilometres (16 mi) north northeast of the city of Kenora. The primary outflow is an unnamed creek at the west, which flows to the Little Black Sturgeon River, then via the Black Sturgeon River and the Winnipeg River to the Nelson River.

== See also ==
- List of lakes in Ontario
