= King County Search and Rescue =

Search and rescue organization

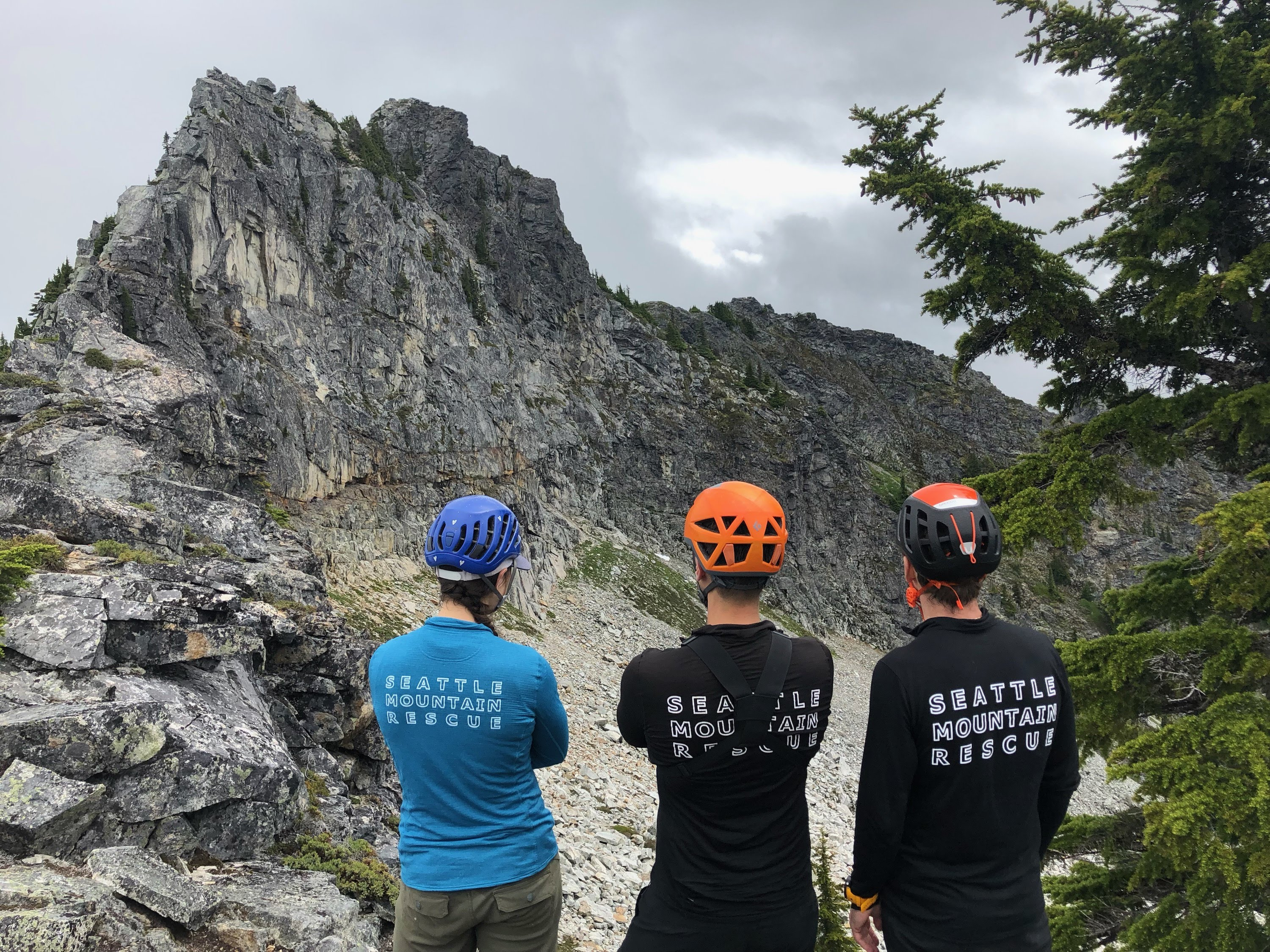
SMR Members on a mission

King County Search and Rescue is a 501(c)(3) non-profit organization that works with the King County Sheriff's Office. It includes seven volunteer units that perform different search and rescue functions, including Seattle Mountain Rescue, which specializes in high-angle, technical rescues, a ski patrol unit that responds to avalanches and backcountry skiing incidents, and the largest unit, which takes care of most ground rescues. In addition to wilderness rescues, the group also finds missing persons in an urban environment, disaster response, body recoveries, and public education. For example they carried out a body recovery for a child that went missing in a lake in Federal Way. In the past, search and rescue volunteers helped locate the victims of the Green River Killer.

In June 2025, the group carried out 5 different rescues for hikers on Mailbox Peak; their other most common locations for incidents are Mt. Si, Snow Lake, and Chiriko Trail on Tiger Mountain. They respond to over 100 incidents a year on areas accessed via I-90. Common hiking incidents that result in search and rescue calls include "dehydration, leg cramps, falls, or people getting lost after dark". The group estimates that a majority of its rescues are due to unprepared people and as a result the group advises hikers to bring emergency supplies such as headlamps, extra water, and warm clothes.

In 2026 members of the group arrived in 12 minutes after a bear attack on the Mount Si trail, as they had been training at the time near the mountain's summit. Altogether 40 people responded to the incident, cleared out the trail, and transported the injured person to a hospital.

Most rescues are carried out by ground teams without the use of a helicopter, although technologies such as ebikes, drones, and exoskeletons are sometimes used. However, in 2026 King County received over $1 million in federal funds for a new helicopter. They have also responded to incidents in other counties.
