= Sherpa Glacier =

Glacier in the state of Washington

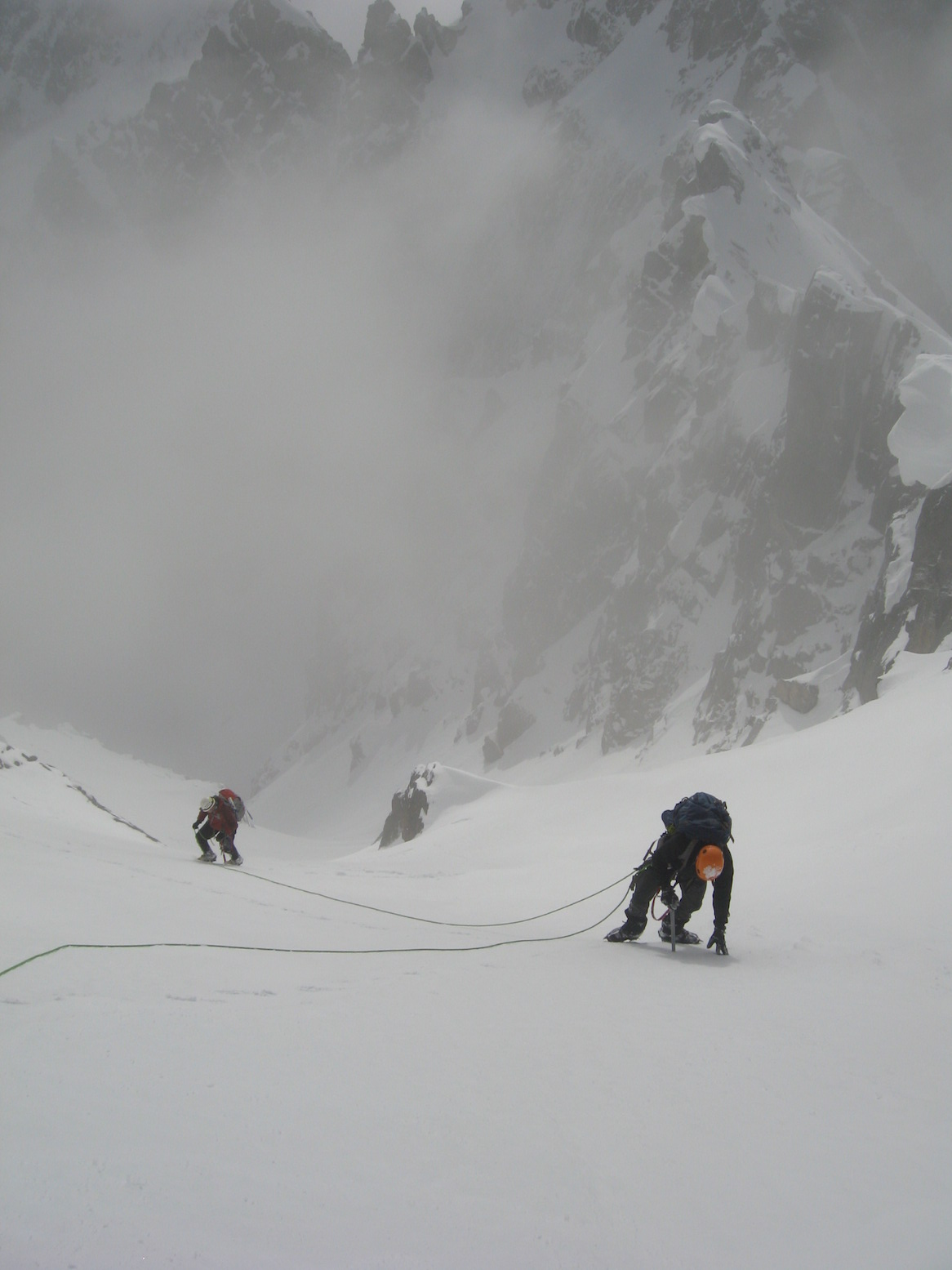
- Sherpa Glacier climbing in the Pacific Northwest

- Location within Washington (state)
- Type: Alpine glacier
- Location: Wenatchee National Forest, Chelan County, Washington, U.S.
- Coordinates: 47°28′31″N 120°53′24″W
- Length: .20 mi (0.32 km)
- Terminus: Icefall
- Status: Retreating

Sherpa Glacier is .50 mi (0.80 km) east of Mount Stuart and north of Sherpa Peak, in the U.S. state of Washington. According to the USGS, this glacier is "named for a mountaineering club active in the area since the 1950s." Sherpa Glacier is within the Alpine Lakes Wilderness of Wenatchee National Forest. The glacier is approximately .20 mi (0.32 km) in length, .15 mi (0.24 km) in width at its widest and descends from 7,600 to 6,600 ft (2,300 to 2,000 m), where it terminates as an icefall. Less than .50 mi (0.80 km) to the northwest lies Stuart Glacier.

== See also ==
- List of glaciers in the United States
