= Source Lake =

Source Lake may refer to:

- Source Lake (Kenora District), in the Nelson River drainage basin
- Source Lake (Nipissing District), in Algonquin Park
