= Stuart Glacier =

Glacier in the state of Washington

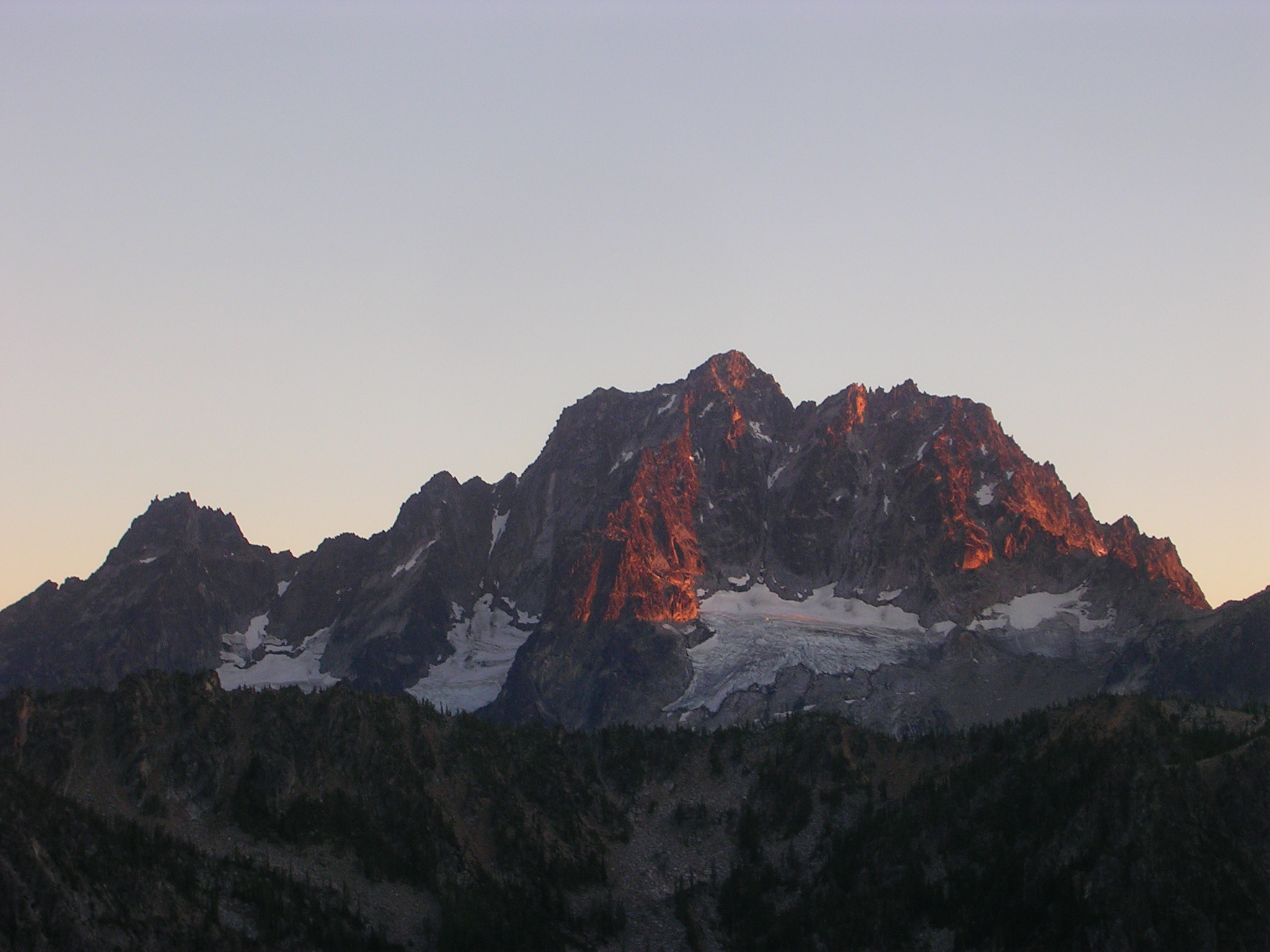
- The Stuart Glacier in the center-right foreground

- Location within Washington (state)
- Type: Alpine glacier
- Location: Wenatchee National Forest, Chelan County, Washington, U.S.
- Coordinates: 47°28′45″N 120°54′06″W
- Length: .20 mi (0.32 km)
- Terminus: Icefall
- Status: Retreating

Stuart Glacier lies to the north of Mount Stuart, in the U.S. state of Washington. Stuart Glacier is within the Alpine Lakes Wilderness of Wenatchee National Forest. The glacier is approximately .20 mi (0.32 km) in length, .25 mi (0.40 km) in width at its widest and descends from 7,400 to 6,400 ft (2,300 to 2,000 m), where it terminates as an icefall. Less than .50 mi (0.80 km) to the southeast lies Sherpa Glacier.

== See also ==
- List of glaciers in the United States
