= Ice Cliff Glacier =

Glacier in Washington, United States

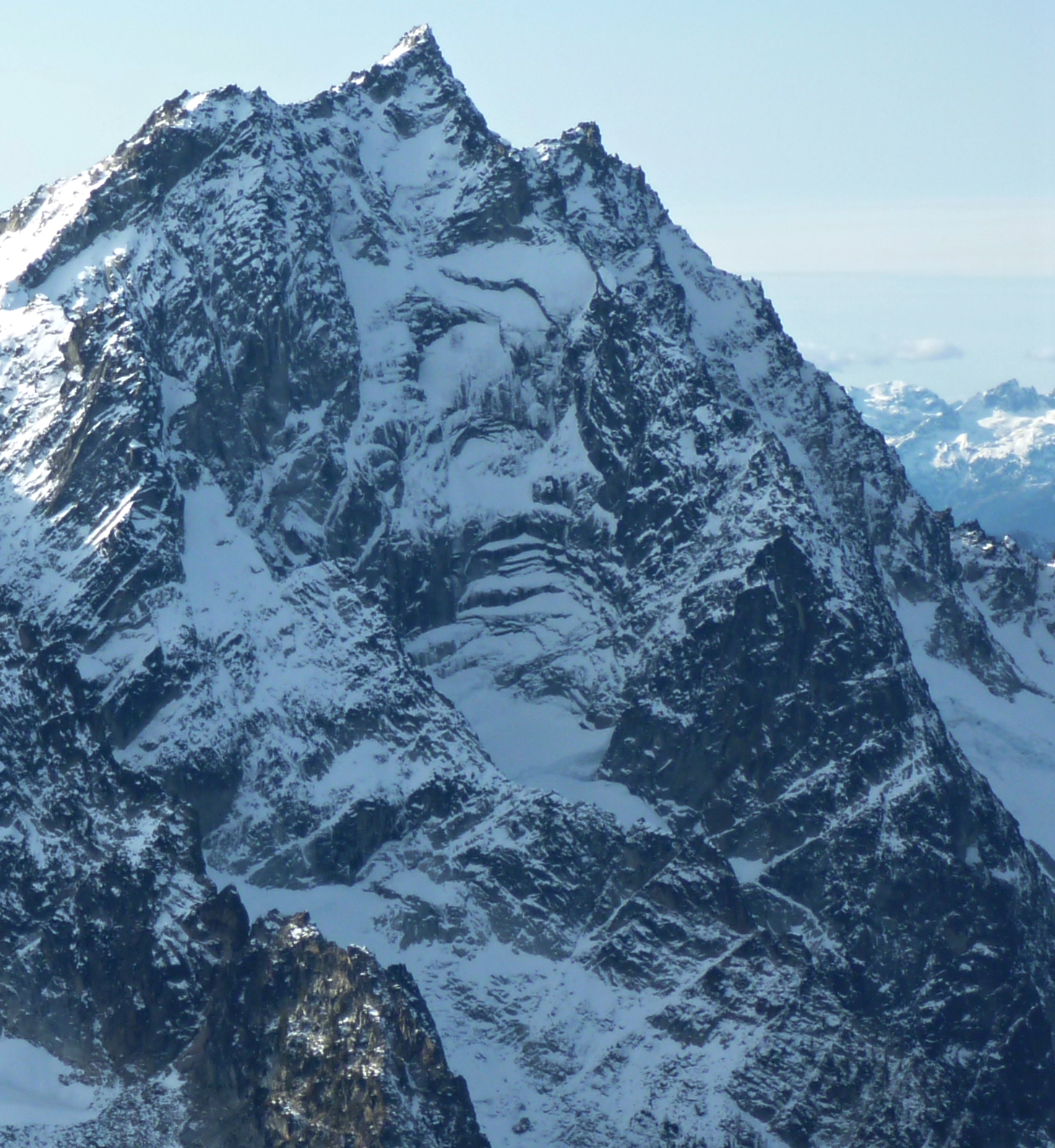
- Ice Cliff Glacier (center) near the summit of Mount Stuart

- Location within Washington (state)
- Type: Mountain glacier
- Location: Chelan County, Washington, U.S.
- Coordinates: 47°28′37″N 120°53′45″W
- Length: .20 mi (0.32 km)
- Terminus: Barren rock/icefall
- Status: Retreating

Ice Cliff Glacier is in Wenatchee National Forest in the U.S. state of Washington, in a cirque to the northeast of Mount Stuart. Ice Cliff Glacier is along one of the many climbing routes to the summit of Mount Stuart, the second tallest non-volcanic peak in the state. A prominent terminal moraine lies .40 mi (0.64 km) below the current terminus of the glacier, indicating significant retreat.

== See also ==
- List of glaciers in the United States
