= Mount Stuart =

Mountain in Washington, United States

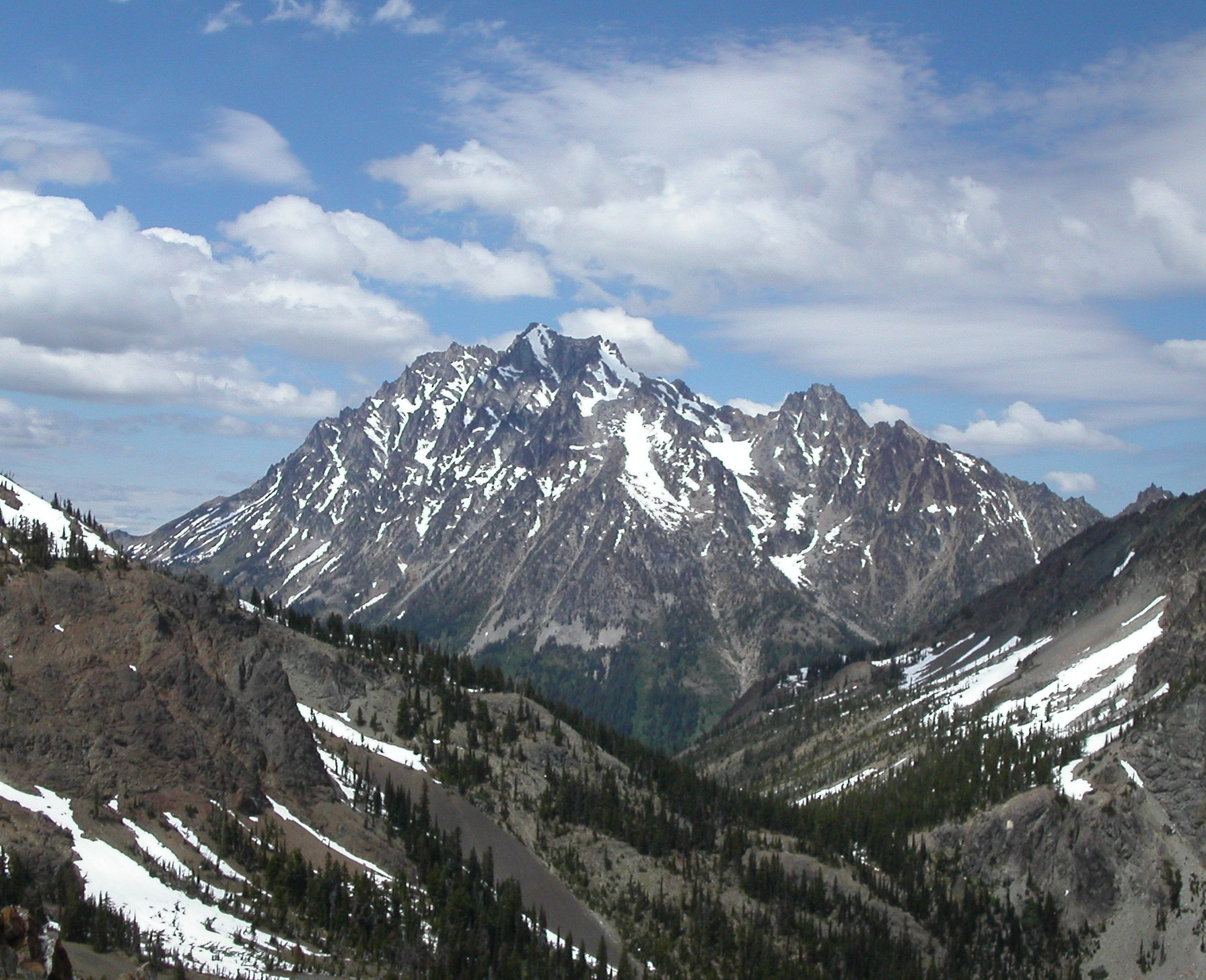
- Mount Stuart from the south.

Highest point
- Elevation: 9,415 ft (2,870 m) NGVD 29
- Prominence: 5,354 ft (1,632 m)
- Listing: US most prominent peaks 102nd
- Coordinates: 47°28′30″N 120°54′11″W

Geography
- Location within Washington (state)
- Location: Chelan County, Washington, U.S.
- Parent range: Stuart Range, Cascade Range
- Topo map: USGS Mount Stuart

Geology
- Rock age: Late Cretaceous
- Mountain type: Granite

Climbing
- First ascent: 1873 by A. McPherson and party
- Easiest route: Major scramble

Mount Stuart is a mountain in the Cascade Range, in the U.S. state of Washington. It is the second highest non-volcanic peak in the state, after Bonanza Peak and sixth-highest overall. Mount Stuart is the highest peak in the Stuart Range, and it is located in the central part of the Washington Cascades, south of Stevens Pass and east of Snoqualmie Pass in the Alpine Lakes Wilderness.

== Name ==
Mount Stuart was given its name by George B. McClellan in September 1853 in honor of his oldest and best friend, "the late Capt. Jas. [Jimmie] Stuart of the Rifles—a gallant soldier & accomplished gentleman." Stuart had died of an arrow wound on June 18, 1851, following a skirmish with Native Americans at the base of the Siskiyou Mountains in southwest Oregon.

== Topography ==
Mount Stuart is more notable for its local relief than for its absolute elevation. For example, the south face rises 5,000 feet (1,500 m) in just 2 horizontal miles (3.2 km). The northeast and northwest sides of the mountain exhibit similar steep relief. Due to its location away from higher peaks, Mount Stuart has a topographic prominence of 5,354 feet (1,632 m), making it the sixth most prominent in the state. The rock of Mount Stuart is rugged due to the extensive jointing of the granite. The north slopes of the mountain shelter three glaciers - Stuart, Ice Cliff and Sherpa Glaciers from west to east.

== Climate ==
Climate data for Mount Stuart 47.4749 N, 120.9001 W, Elevation: 8,484 ft (2,586 m) (1991–2020 normals)
Month	Jan	Feb	Mar	Apr	May	Jun	Jul	Aug	Sep	Oct	Nov	Dec	Year
Mean daily maximum °F (°C)	24.6 (−4.1)	24.3 (−4.3)	26.1 (−3.3)	31.0 (−0.6)	39.8 (4.3)	46.0 (7.8)	56.4 (13.6)	57.1 (13.9)	51.2 (10.7)	40.2 (4.6)	28.0 (−2.2)	23.1 (−4.9)	37.3 (3.0)
Daily mean °F (°C)	19.6 (−6.9)	18.1 (−7.7)	18.8 (−7.3)	22.6 (−5.2)	30.8 (−0.7)	36.5 (2.5)	45.4 (7.4)	46.1 (7.8)	40.5 (4.7)	31.3 (−0.4)	22.6 (−5.2)	18.4 (−7.6)	29.2 (−1.5)
Mean daily minimum °F (°C)	14.6 (−9.7)	11.9 (−11.2)	11.4 (−11.4)	14.2 (−9.9)	21.7 (−5.7)	27.0 (−2.8)	34.4 (1.3)	35.1 (1.7)	29.9 (−1.2)	22.4 (−5.3)	17.2 (−8.2)	13.7 (−10.2)	21.1 (−6.0)
Average precipitation inches (mm)	12.07 (307)	8.17 (208)	7.58 (193)	4.12 (105)	2.87 (73)	1.75 (44)	0.71 (18)	0.80 (20)	2.09 (53)	6.69 (170)	12.12 (308)	10.82 (275)	69.79 (1,774)
Source: PRISM Climate Group

== Climbing history ==
It is not known for sure who made the first ascent of Mount Stuart. According to Fred Beckey: "Claude Rusk... was told by Frank Bryant of Yakima about finding a stick at the summit bearing the name `Angus McPherson—1873.' A. H. Sylvester, who climbed to the summit in 1897 and 1899 for triangulation, believed the first ascent was made by Frank Tweedy and Richard Goode during the Northern Pacific land survey." Tweedy (after whom Tweedy's pussypaws is named) climbed Mount Stuart on August 5, 1883, and two days later again with Goode (after whom Goode Mountain is named). They did not report finding evidence of an earlier ascent. Since the easiest route is not too technical, an earlier Native American ascent is also a possibility.

The standard route is the Cascadian Couloir up the southeast flank of the mountain, which ascends to a false summit just southeast of the main summit, and finishes along a short ridge. The route involves scrambling and often steep snow. Far more technical climbs are available on the complex north face and other aspects of the mountain.

== See also ==
- List of highest mountain peaks in Washington
- List of mountain peaks of North America
  - List of mountain peaks of the United States
    - List of Ultras of the United States
- Fifty Classic Climbs of North America
