= Little Black Sturgeon River =

- Location of the mouth of the Little Black Sturgeon River in Ontario.

Location
- Country: Canada
- Province: Ontario
- Region: Northwestern Ontario
- District: Kenora

Physical characteristics
- Source: Willard Lake
  - coordinates: 49°50′42″N 94°00′26″W
  - elevation: 380 m (1,250 ft)
- Mouth: Black Sturgeon River
  - coordinates: 49°49′26″N 94°15′40″W
  - elevation: 317 m (1,040 ft)

The Little Black Sturgeon River is a river in the Nelson River drainage basin in Kenora District, northwestern Ontario, Canada. It is a tributary of the Black Sturgeon River.

== Course ==
The river begins at Willard Lake at an elevation of 380 metres (1,247 ft), about 3 kilometres (1.9 mi) northwest of Ontario Highway 17 and the community of Willard Lake. It flows northwest to Beaubien Lake, then south through High Lake and Low Lake, and west to Drewry Lake. It passes under Ontario Highway 671 and reaches its mouth at Black Sturgeon Lakes on the Black Sturgeon River about 15 kilometres (9 mi) east of the city of Kenora.

== See also ==
- List of rivers of Ontario
