= Camp Muir =

- U.S. National Register of Historic Places
- U.S. Historic district
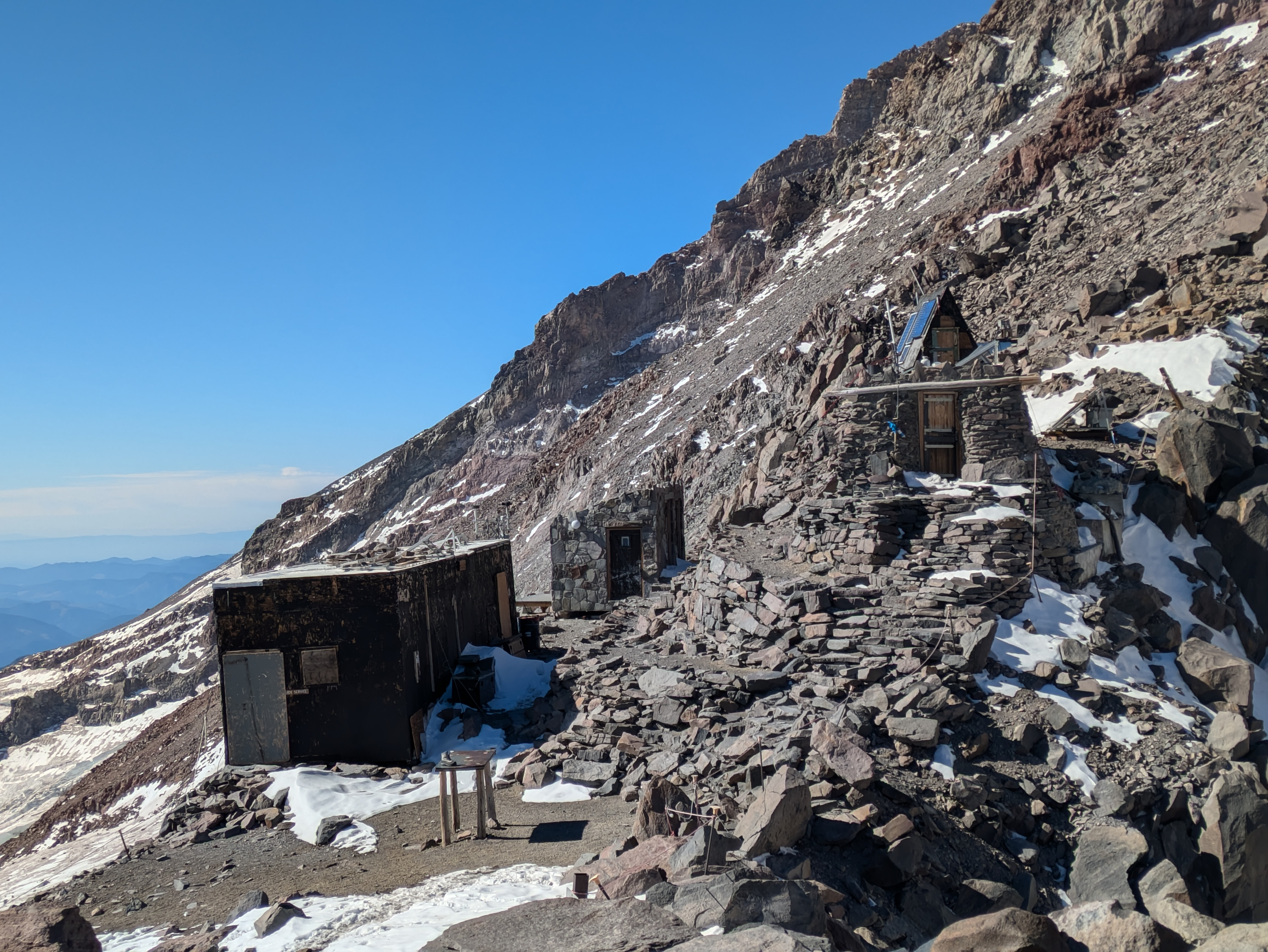
- Western side of Camp Muir

- Location within Washington (state)
- Coordinates: 46°50′8″N 121°43′53″W
- MPS: Mt. Rainier National Park MPS
- NRHP reference No.: 91000176
- Added to NRHP: March 13, 1991

Camp Muir, named for the naturalist John Muir, is a high-altitude refuge for climbers in Mount Rainier National Park in Washington, accessed through the Paradise Entrance. The shelters comprising the camp are situated at a 10,188 ft (3,105 m) elevation between the Muir Snowfield and the Cowlitz Glacier on Mount Rainier. Camp Muir is the most-used high camp for those attempting to climb to the mountain's summit. Camp Muir is between the Nisqually and Paradise Glaciers.

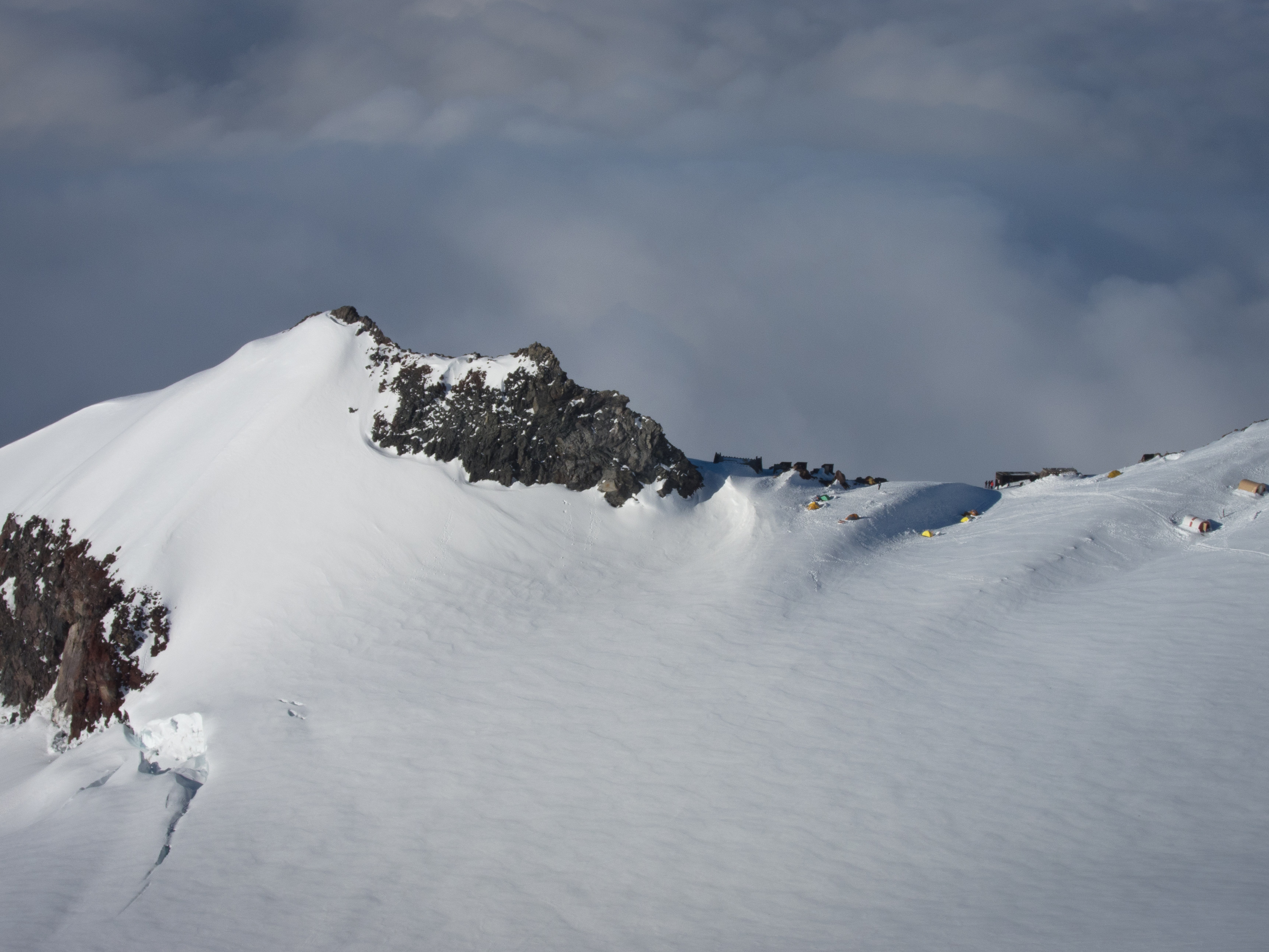
Camp Muir from the northeast

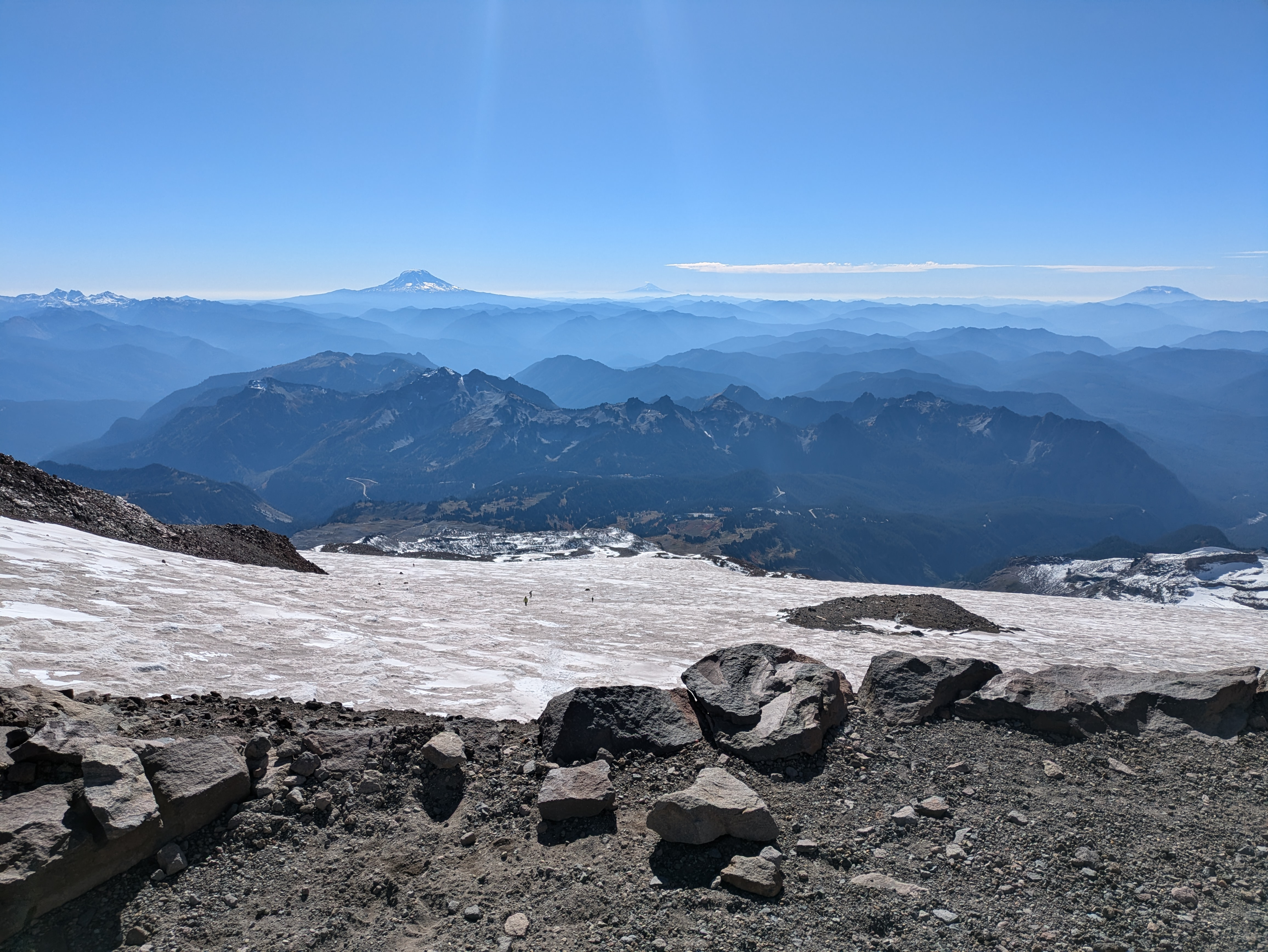
The snowfield to the south of Camp Muir, looking down towards Paradise

The larger "public" shelter hut was built in 1921 to plans supervised by Daniel Ray Hull of the National Park Service. The 12-foot (3.7 m) by 25-foot (7.6 m) single-story one-room shelter was initially constructed of dry-laid stone. It replaced a smaller shelter which was used as a shelter for climbing guides. A dedication plaque at the entrance to the large shelter plaque reads "Erected in memory of John Muir, 1921." The guide shelter was built in 1916 by a climbing organization, the Mountaineers. It was designed by Seattle architect Carl F. Gould, a member of the Mountaineers and was approved by Park Service director Stephen T. Mather. The single-story guide shelter measures about 10 feet (3.0 m) by 24 feet (7.3 m), and is the oldest stone structure in the park. Two stone pit toilets were built at Camp Muir in 1936 by the Civilian Conservation Corps, one of which survives and is used for storage.

There are 12 approaches to the summit from Paradise. Camp Muir provides 7 of those. Of the 7, 4 are grade II, 2 are grade III, and 1 is grade II-III.

Camp Muir was placed on the National Register of Historic Places on March 13, 1991. It is part of the Mount Rainier National Historic Landmark District, which encompasses the entire park and which recognizes the park's inventory of Park Service-designed rustic architecture.

== Climate ==
Climate data for Camp Muir (2016-2024)
Month	Jan	Feb	Mar	Apr	May	Jun	Jul	Aug	Sep	Oct	Nov	Dec	Year
Record high °F (°C)	41.0 (5.0)	47.7 (8.7)	53.6 (12.0)	60.1 (15.6)	53.9 (12.2)	66.5 (19.2)	66.8 (19.3)	68.6 (20.3)	62.7 (17.1)	57.0 (13.9)	51.3 (10.7)	45.0 (7.2)	68.6 (20.3)
Mean daily maximum °F (°C)	22.2 (−5.4)	22.9 (−5.1)	22.4 (−5.3)	28.4 (−2.0)	36.4 (2.4)	39.7 (4.3)	47.4 (8.6)	50.8 (10.4)	41.8 (5.4)	35.5 (1.9)	25.7 (−3.5)	22.4 (−5.3)	33.0 (0.5)
Daily mean °F (°C)	16.9 (−8.4)	15.8 (−9.0)	15.8 (−9.0)	21.7 (−5.7)	30.0 (−1.1)	33.9 (1.1)	42.3 (5.7)	45.3 (7.4)	36.5 (2.5)	30.4 (−0.9)	20.3 (−6.5)	16.5 (−8.6)	27.1 (−2.7)
Mean daily minimum °F (°C)	11.8 (−11.2)	9.0 (−12.8)	10.2 (−12.1)	16.1 (−8.8)	24.9 (−3.9)	28.7 (−1.8)	38.0 (3.3)	40.6 (4.8)	31.7 (−0.2)	25.3 (−3.7)	15.0 (−9.4)	10.8 (−11.8)	21.8 (−5.6)
Record low °F (°C)	−8.8 (−22.7)	−12.1 (−24.5)	−5.5 (−20.8)	−3.4 (−19.7)	4.8 (−15.1)	11.2 (−11.6)	22.9 (−5.1)	22.1 (−5.5)	11.9 (−11.2)	4.4 (−15.3)	−3.8 (−19.9)	−4.8 (−20.4)	−12.1 (−24.5)
Average relative humidity (%)	76.1	75.5	73.0	63.5	63.1	58.1	44.2	44.0	55.8	63.0	72.4	71.7	63.4
Source: NWAC

Climate data for Camp Muir 46.8362 N, 121.7335 W, Elevation: 10,187 ft (3,105 m) (1991–2020 normals, interpolated)
Month	Jan	Feb	Mar	Apr	May	Jun	Jul	Aug	Sep	Oct	Nov	Dec	Year
Average precipitation inches (mm)	20.36 (517)	16.12 (409)	15.76 (400)	9.74 (247)	5.05 (128)	4.24 (108)	1.44 (37)	1.81 (46)	4.47 (114)	10.82 (275)	18.05 (458)	18.88 (480)	126.74 (3,219)
Source: PRISM Climate Group
