= Seattle Mountain Rescue =

Volunteer mountain rescue unit based in Seattle, WA, US

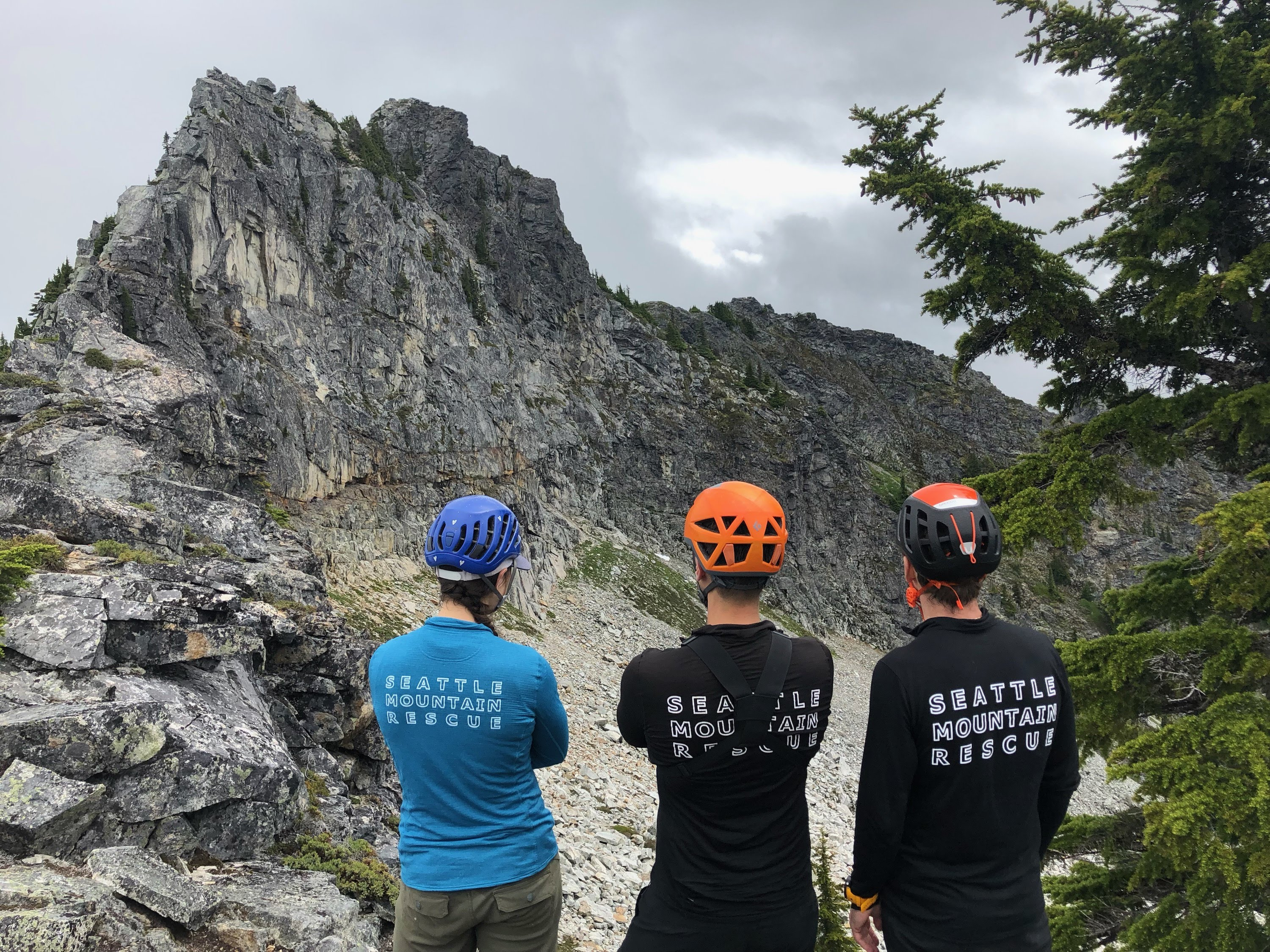
- Members of Seattle Mountain Rescue scout a route during a mission
- Founded: 1948
- Type: Public Safety, Search and Rescue
- Location: Seattle, Washington
- Region served: Western Washington United States
- Method: Mountain Rescue, Rope Rescue, Avalanche Rescue
- Website: seattlemountainrescue.org

Seattle Mountain Rescue (SMR) is an all volunteer non-profit mountain rescue team operating out of King County, Washington. SMR is part of the King County Search & Rescue Association (KCSARA) and is also part of the Mountain Rescue Association, frequently working with other King County SAR teams as well as neighboring mountain rescue teams, including Everett Mountain Rescue, Tacoma Mountain Rescue, and Olympic Mountain Rescue.

== Operational history ==
The organization's roots started in the 1930s as an informal list of alpinists rescuing their fellow climbers in the Pacific Northwest. Many of these volunteers had served in the 10th Mountain Division (United States) during World War II. Some of the early leaders of Seattle Mountain Rescue, notably Wolf Bauer, Ome Daiber, and Dr. Otto Trott, brought back extensive knowledge from Europe, designed new gear, and pioneered new alpine climbing techniques.

Seattle Mountain Rescue was officially organized in the spring of 1948 as Mountain Rescue Council (MRC), the first Mountain Rescue organization in North America. This was under the sponsorship of the Mountaineers, the Washington Alpine Club, and the Northwest Region of the National Ski Patrol. Today, Seattle Mountain Rescue is still officially incorporated as Mountain Rescue Council to preserve its lineage and historical roots.

The first full-scale mission for the organization came in September 1948, when Robert Thorson, a Bremerton Eagle Scout, son of a prominent physician, and Bremerton High School student body president, was reported injured on the Brothers. Team members reached the accident site below the summit shortly after sunrise to find that Bob had died as a result of the fall. He is commemorated today by “Thorson Peak”, located in the Pershing Massif across the valley from the Brothers.

== Mission Dispatch ==
Seattle Mountain Rescue is a Department of Emergency Management resource that is deployed under authority of the King County Sheriff's department. Typically, a reporting party calls 911 and alerts the dispatcher that someone in the mountains is lost or is in need of rescue assistance. (The reporting party may be the subject or his/her partner, or maybe someone in the city reporting an overdue hiker.) In King County, a Sheriff's Deputy will be immediately alerted and act as Incident Commander, dispatching appropriate SAR resources, to include SMR. Outside of King County, a request will be made from that jurisdiction to the King County Sheriff's Office for SMR's involvement. Once SMR has been contacted, they coordinate team rescuers to deploy into the field.

== Mountain Rescue Center (MRC) - Seattle Mountain Rescue World Headquarters ==
In December 2020 Seattle Mountain Rescue (SMR) bought its first facility to centralize its rescue equipment, enhance team training and support mountain safety education through community partners. The building in North Bend, Washington has establish the teams world headquarters the "Mountain Rescue Center (MRC)" in the Mountain to Sound Greenway sitting near the foothills of the cascades. The location places it 30min from snoqualmie pass and close to much of the popular recreation in the region.
