= Black Sturgeon River (Kenora District) =

- Location of the mouth of the Black Sturgeon River in Ontario.

Location
- Country: Canada
- Province: Ontario
- Region: Northwestern Ontario
- District: Kenora

Physical characteristics
- Source: Silver Lake
  - coordinates: 49°50′44″N 94°14′07″W
  - elevation: 341 m (1,119 ft)
- Mouth: Winnipeg River
  - coordinates: 49°54′43″N 94°32′36″W
  - elevation: 315 m (1,033 ft)
- Length: 30 km (19 mi)

Basin features
- Tributaries
  - left: Little Black Sturgeon River

The Black Sturgeon River is a river in the Nelson River drainage basin in Kenora District, northwestern Ontario, Canada. It is a tributary of the Winnipeg River.

== Course ==
The river begins at Silver Lake, and exits at the west at Crystal Bay. It flows west into the Northeast Bay of Black Sturgeon Lakes, then through the Grassy Narrows to the main part of the lake, where it takes in the left tributary Little Black Sturgeon River. The river heads into the city of Kenora and through a narrows past the communities of Lajeunesse Bridge and Pelletier Bridge, and turns north through another arm of Black Sturgeon Lakes. The river is crossed at the north end of the lake by Ontario Highway 658, where it exits the city of Kenora, then tumbles over Black Sturgeon Rapids to reach its mouth at the Winnipeg River.

== Tributaries ==
- Little Black Sturgeon River (left)

== See also ==
- List of rivers of Ontario
