= Kautz =

Kautz is a surname. Notable people with the surname include:

- Albert Kautz (1839–1907), American naval officer from Ohio
- August Kautz (1828–1895), German-American soldier and cavalry officer
- Christian Kautz (1913–1948), Swiss auto racing driver
- Friedrich Kautz, (born 1979), "Prinz Pi", German rapper
- Jacob Kautz (1500–1532), Anabaptist who posted seven theses to the door of Worms Cathedral in 1527
- Julius Kautz (1829–1909), Hungarian economist

== See also ==
- Kautz Creek, tributary of the Nisqually River in the Mount Rainier National Park of Washington
- Kautz Creek Falls, waterfall on Kautz Creek in the Mount Rainier National Park of Washington
- Kautz Glacier, narrow glacier on the southern flank of Mount Rainier in Washington
- Kautz Family YMCA Archives collects the historical records of its national organization, the YMCA of the USA
- Kautz filter, named after William H. Kautz, is a fixed-pole traversal filter, published in 1954
- Kautz graph, directed graph of degree M and dimension N + 1, which has (M + 1)MN vertices labeled by all possible strings of length N + 1 which are composed of characters chosen from an alphabet A containing M + 1 distinct symbols, subject to the condition that adjacent characters in the string cannot be equal…
- Wilson-Kautz Raid, cavalry operation in south central Virginia in late June 1864 during the American Civil War
