= Tumtum Peak =

Mountain in Washington (state), United States

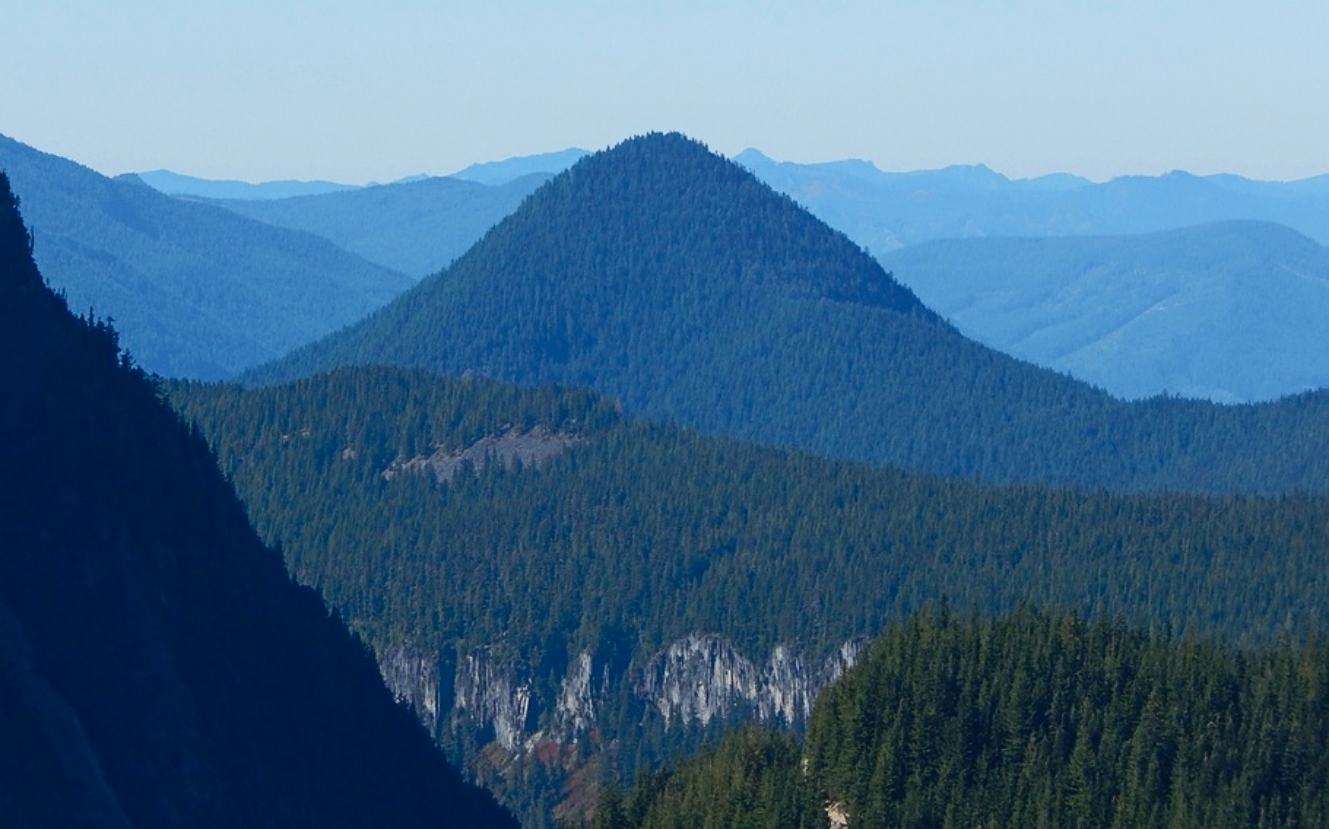
- East aspect

Highest point
- Elevation: 4,678 ft (1,426 m)
- Prominence: 1,078 ft (329 m)
- Parent peak: Mount Wow (6,040 ft)
- Isolation: 2.19 mi (3.52 km)
- Coordinates: 46°44′58″N 121°52′02″W

Geography
- Location within Washington (state) Location within the United States
- Country: United States
- State: Washington
- County: Pierce
- Protected area: Mount Rainier National Park
- Parent range: Cascades
- Topo map: USGS Wahpenayo Peak

Geology
- Rock age: Eocene
- Rock type: Ohanapecosh Formation

Climbing
- Easiest route: scrambling

Tumtum Peak is a 4,678-foot-elevation (1,426-meter) mountain summit located in the southwest corner of Mount Rainier National Park, in Pierce County of Washington state. This top-to-bottom forested peak is part of the Cascade Range and lies 8.7 mi (14.0 km) southwest of the summit of Mount Rainier. The nearest higher neighbor is Mount Wow, 2.2 mi (3.5 km) to the northwest, and Iron Mountain rises 3.56 mi (5.73 km) to the northeast. Precipitation runoff from Tumtum Peak is drained by Tahoma Creek on the west side of the mountain, whereas Kautz Creek drains the east side, and both are tributaries of the Nisqually River. The Road to Paradise traverses the southern base of the peak shortly after visitors to the park enter via the Nisqually Entrance. Topographic relief is significant as the southwest aspect rises nearly 2,500 feet (760 meters) above the road in one mile.

== Etymology ==
The "tumtum" name derives from Chinook Jargon for a word meaning "heart, or heartbeat", and refers to the shape of the landform. The toponym was officially adopted in 1913 by the United States Board on Geographic Names.

== Climate ==
Tumtum Peak is located in the marine west coast climate zone of western North America. Most weather fronts originating in the Pacific Ocean travel northeast toward the Cascade Mountains. As fronts approach, they are forced upward by the peaks of the Cascade Range (orographic lift), causing them to drop their moisture in the form of rain or snow onto the Cascades. As a result, the west side of the Cascades experiences high precipitation, especially during the winter months in the form of snowfall. Because of maritime influence, snow tends to be wet and heavy, resulting in high avalanche danger. During winter months, weather is usually cloudy, but due to high pressure systems over the Pacific Ocean that intensify during summer months, there is often little or no cloud cover during the summer.

== Gallery ==
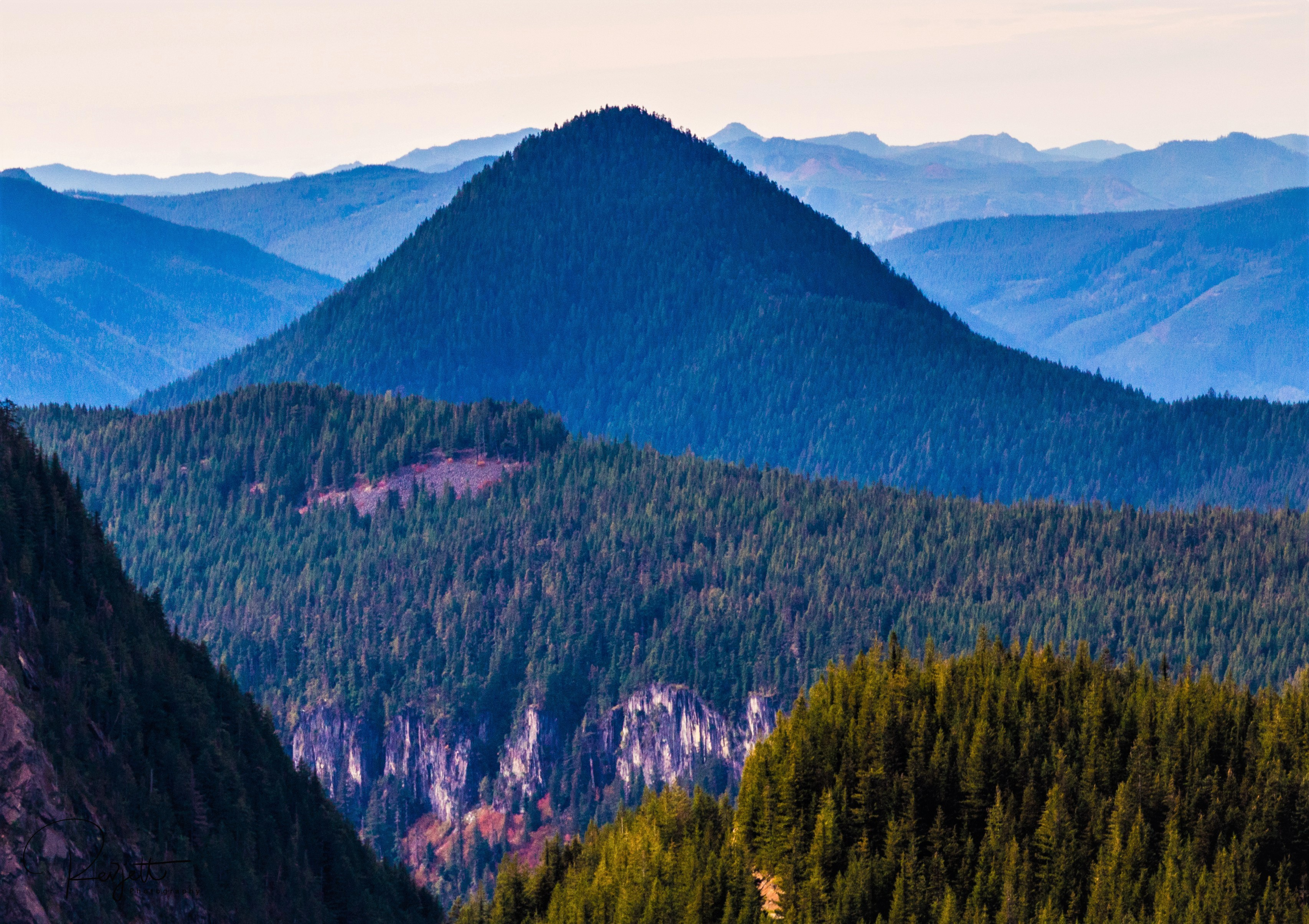
Tumtum Peak seen from Inspiration Point

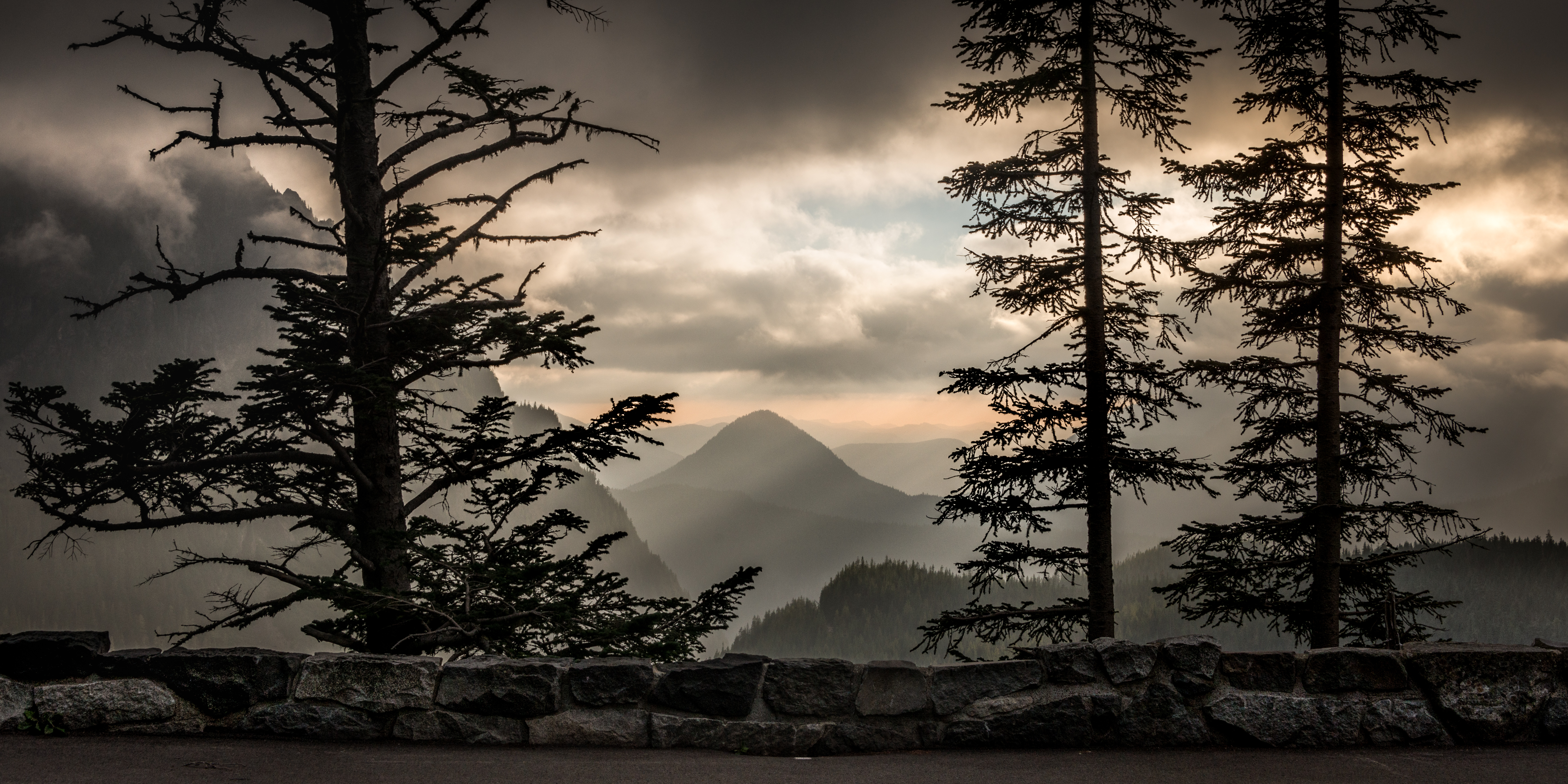
Tumtum Peak seen from Inspiration Point

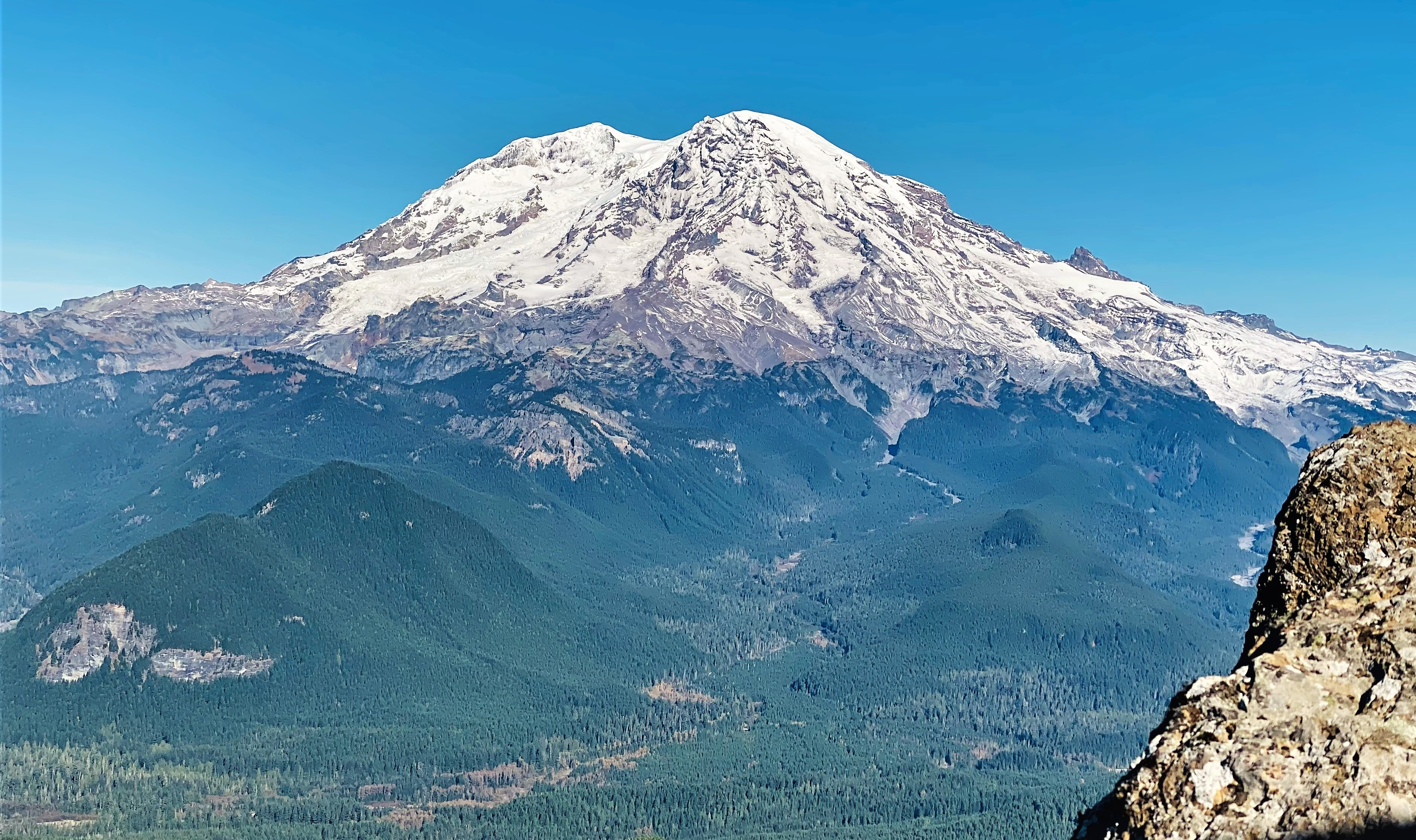
Mt. Rainier and Tumtum Peak (lower left) viewed from High Rock Lookout.

== See also ==
- Geology of the Pacific Northwest
