= Pyramid Glacier =

Glacier in the United States

- Interactive map of Pyramid Glacier
- Type: Mountain glacier
- Location: Mount Rainier, Pierce County, Washington, USA
- Coordinates: 46°49′23″N 121°47′26″W
- Area: 0.2 square miles (0.5 km^{2}), 1983

The Pyramid Glacier is actually a scattering of glaciers and snowfields located on the south-southwestern flank of Mount Rainier in Washington. It covers 0.2 square miles (0.5 km^{2}) and contains 400 million ft^{3} (11 million m^{3}) of ice. The glaciers lie at an elevation ranging from about 7,000 feet (2,100 m) to 9,000 ft (2,700 m). The Success Divide separates this glacier from the South Tahoma Glacier to the west. Both the Success Glacier and lower end of the Kautz Glacier border this glacier on the eastern side. Meltwater from the glacier drains into the Nisqually River.

In a June 2023 report from the National Park Service, the glacier had lost 34% of its volume between 2015 and 2021. Based on 2022 satellite imagery, glaciologist Mauri Pelto declared Pyramid Glacier dead.

== See also ==
- List of glaciers
