= Mineral mountain =

Mineral Mountain may refer to:

- Mineral Mountain (North Cascades National Park), a mountain in North Cascades National Park in Washington, USA
- Mineral Mountain (Mount Rainier National Park), a mountain in Mount Rainier National Park in Washington, USA
- Mineral Mountains (Utah), a mountain range in southwestern Utah, USA
- Mineral Mountains (Arizona), a group of rugged, volcanic hills and mountains in southern Arizona, USA
