= Copper Mountain (Pierce County, Washington) =

Mountain in Washington (state), United States

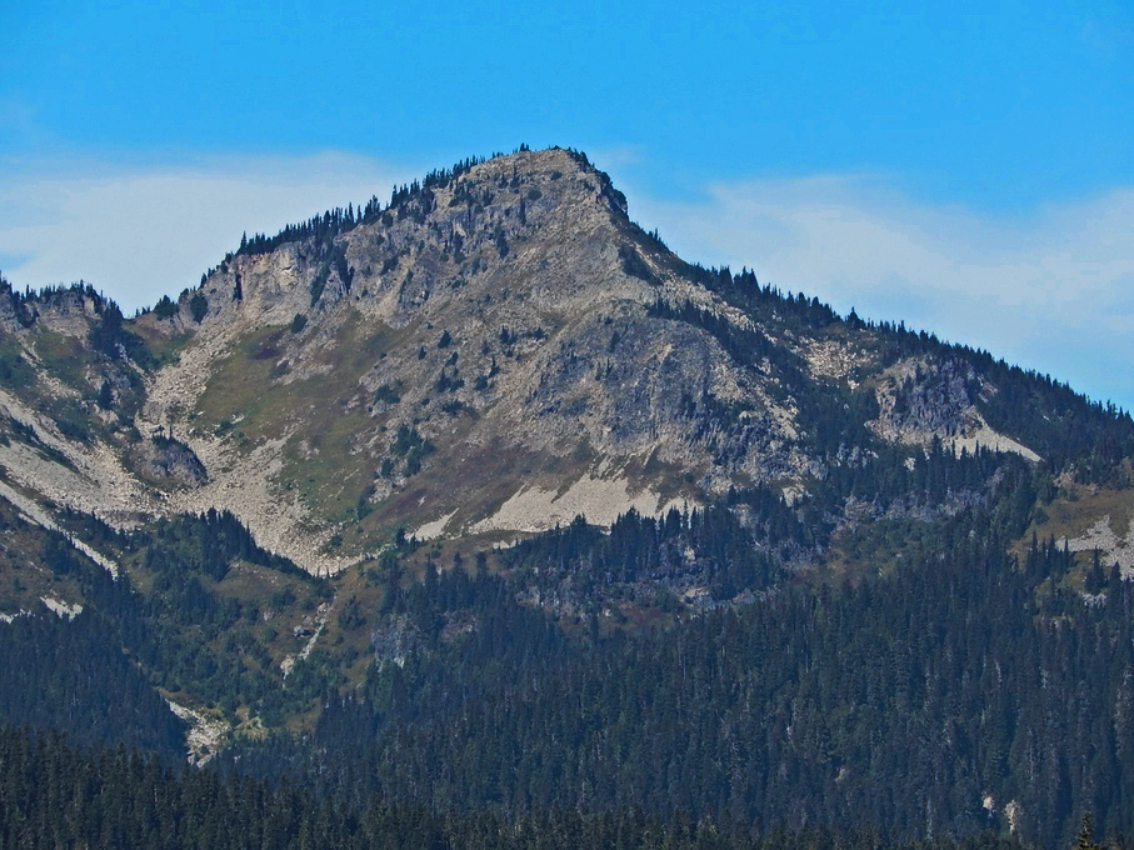
- Copper Mountain seen from the southeast

Highest point
- Elevation: 6,302 ft (1,921 m)
- Prominence: 720 ft (219 m)
- Parent peak: Pyramid Peak
- Isolation: 0.98 mi (1.58 km)
- Coordinates: 46°47′51″N 121°49′40″W

Geography
- Location within Washington (state) Location within the United States
- Country: United States
- State: Washington
- County: Pierce
- Protected area: Mount Rainier National Park
- Parent range: Cascade Range
- Topo map: USGS Mount Rainier West

Climbing
- Easiest route: Scrambling

Copper Mountain is a 6,302-foot (1,921-metre) mountain summit located in Mount Rainier National Park in Pierce County of Washington state. Part of the Cascade Range, it is situated near the base of the Success Cleaver, overlooking Indian Henry's Hunting Ground. Its nearest neighbor is Iron Mountain 0.3 miles (0.48 km) to the south, and the nearest higher peak is Pyramid Peak, one mile (1.6 km) to the northeast. The summit provides views of Mount Rainier, Mount Adams, Mount St. Helens, and peaks of the Tatoosh Range. Precipitation runoff from Copper Mountain drains into Tahoma Creek and Fishers Horn Pipe Creek, which are both tributaries of the Nisqually River. There were great hopes in the late 1800s that mines on Mount Rainier could be a source of precious metals such as copper, silver, and gold. This landform's toponym was officially adopted in 1932 by the United States Board on Geographic Names.

== Climate ==
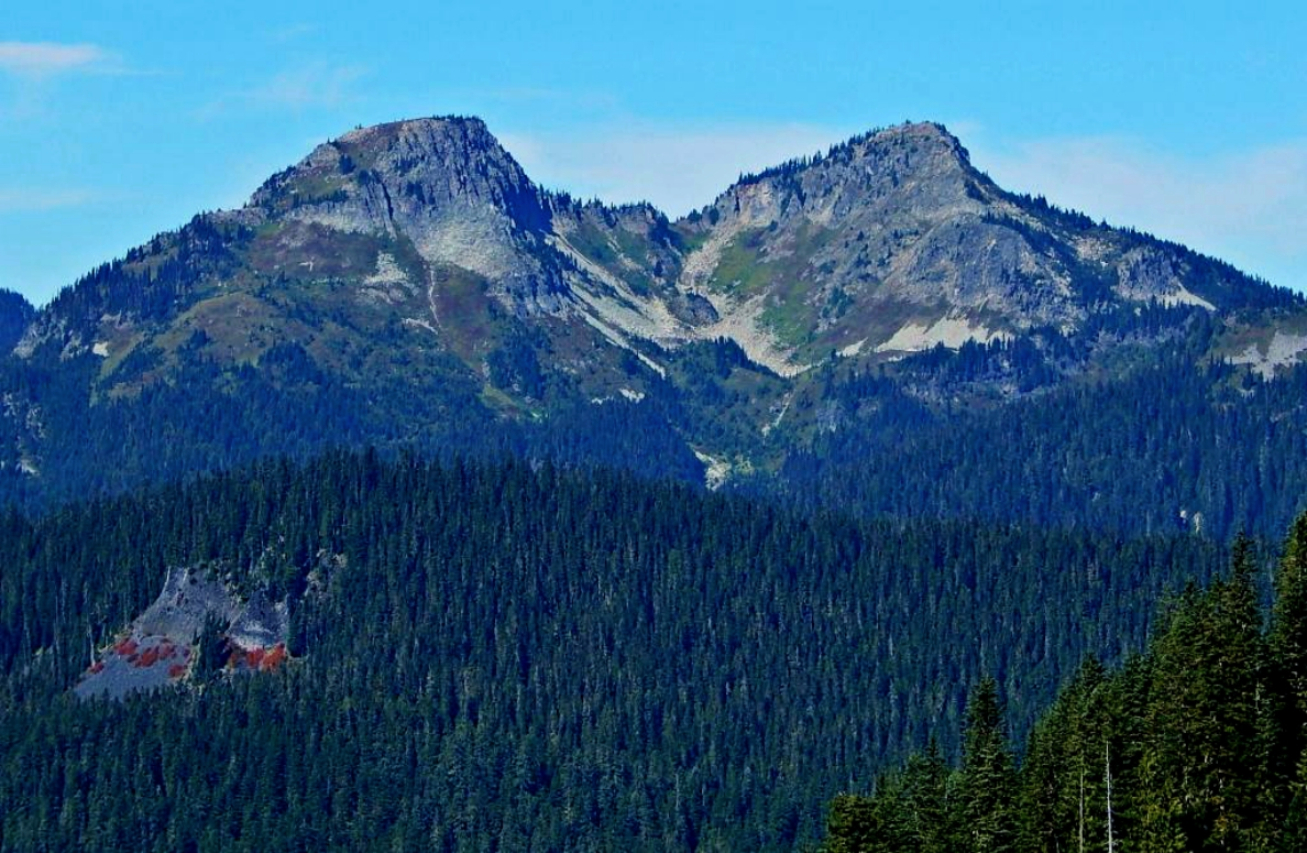
Iron Mountain (left) and Copper Mountain

Copper Mountain is located in the marine west coast climate zone of western North America. Most weather fronts originating in the Pacific Ocean travel northeast toward the Cascade Mountains. As fronts approach, they are forced upward by the peaks of the Cascade Range (orographic lift), causing them to drop their moisture in the form of rain or snow onto the Cascades. As a result, the west side of the Cascades experiences high precipitation, especially during the winter months in the form of snowfall. Because of maritime influence, snow tends to be wet and heavy, resulting in high avalanche danger. During winter months, weather is usually cloudy, but due to high pressure systems over the Pacific Ocean that intensify during summer months, there is often little or no cloud cover during the summer.

== See also ==
- Geography of Washington (state)
- Geology of the Pacific Northwest
