= Pyramid Peak (Pierce County, Washington) =

Mountain in Washington (state), United States

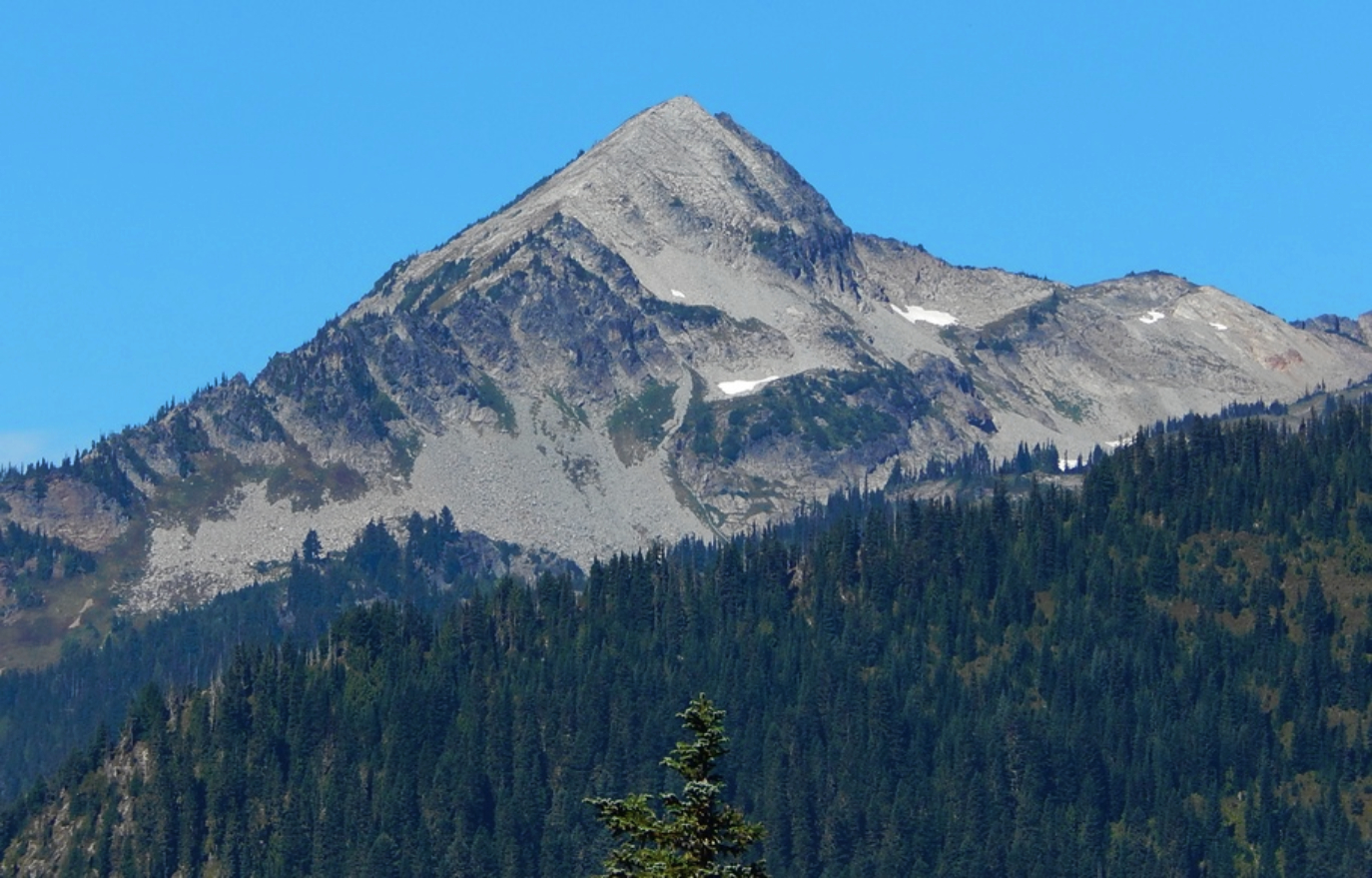
- Pyramid Peak seen from the southeast

Highest point
- Elevation: 6,937 ft (2,114 m)
- Prominence: 497 ft (151 m)
- Parent peak: Mount Rainier
- Isolation: 1.26 mi (2.03 km)
- Coordinates: 46°48′25″N 121°48′43″W

Geography
- Location within Washington (state) Location within the United States
- Country: United States
- State: Washington
- County: Pierce
- Protected area: Mount Rainier National Park
- Parent range: Cascades
- Topo map: USGS Mount Rainier West

Climbing
- First ascent: 1915 Mountaineers party.
- Easiest route: Scrambling

Pyramid Peak is a 6,937-foot (2,114-metre) mountain summit located in Mount Rainier National Park in Pierce County of Washington state. It is part of the Cascade Range and overlooks Indian Henry's Hunting Ground. It is situated at the base of the Success Cleaver, south of South Tahoma Glacier, and southwest of Pyramid Glacier. The summit provides views of Mount Rainier, Mount Adams, Mount St. Helens, and peaks of the Tatoosh Range. Precipitation runoff from Pyramid Peak drains into Pyramid Creek, Tahoma Creek, and Fishers Horn Pipe Creek, which are all tributaries of the Nisqually River.

== History ==
The descriptive name Pyramid Peak came from its pyramidal shape. An early writer described the peak as follows; "We had a better chance to observe Pyramid Peak in the morning light. It is in the form of a gigantic pyramid, perfect in outline. From a distance it appears to be black basalt, and on its sides no snow clings." The toponym was officially adopted in 1913 by the United States Board on Geographic Names. The first ascent of this peak was made in 1915 by a Mountaineers party.

== Climate ==
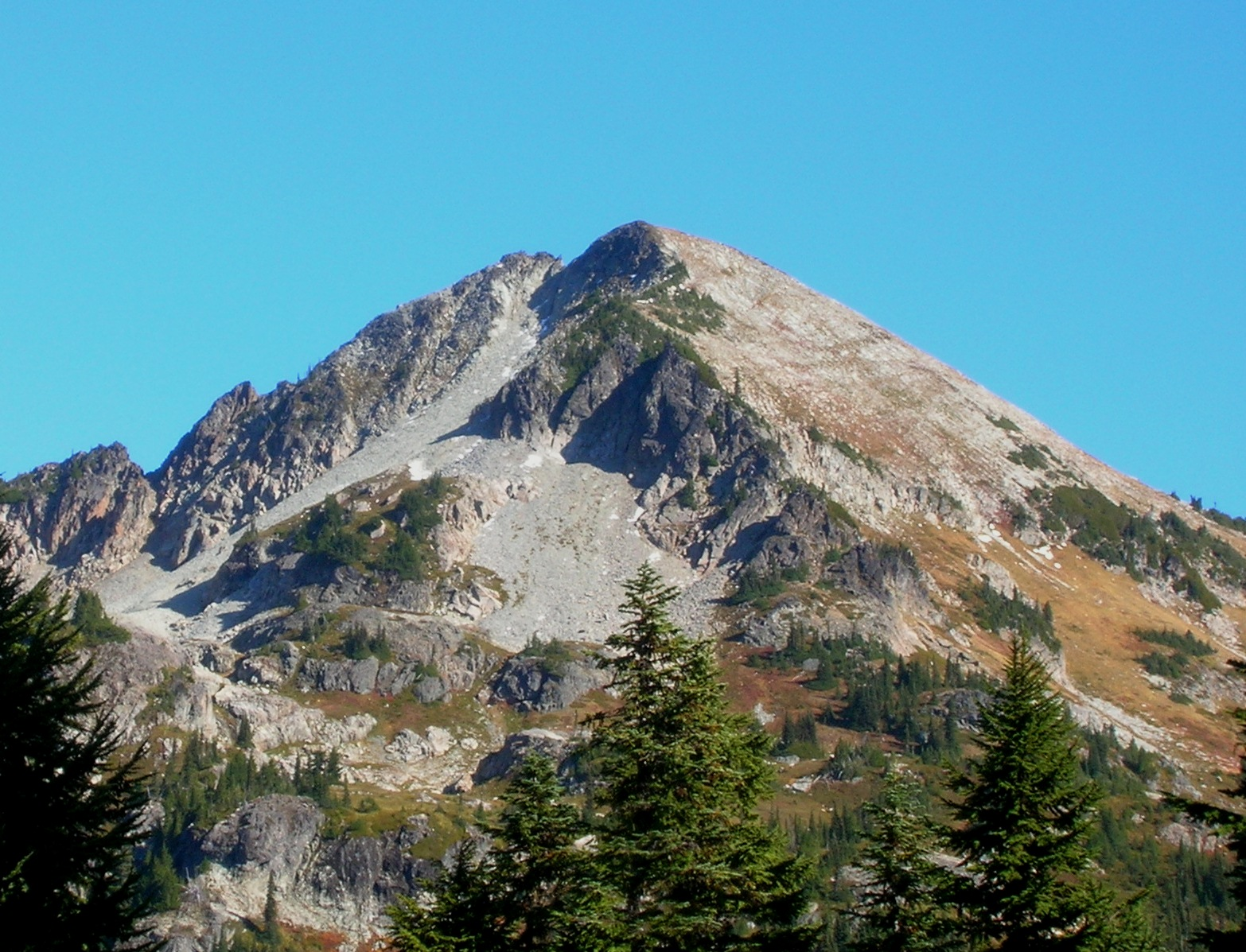
West aspect from Indian Henrys Hunting Ground

Pyramid Peak is located in the marine west coast climate zone of western North America. Most weather fronts originating in the Pacific Ocean travel northeast toward the Cascade Mountains. As fronts approach, they are forced upward by the peaks of the Cascade Range (orographic lift), causing them to drop their moisture in the form of rain or snow onto the Cascades. As a result, the west side of the Cascades experiences high precipitation, especially during the winter months in the form of snowfall. Because of maritime influence, snow tends to be wet and heavy, resulting in high avalanche danger. During winter months, weather is usually cloudy, but due to high pressure systems over the Pacific Ocean that intensify during summer months, there is often little or no cloud cover during the summer.

== See also ==
- Geography of Washington (state)
- Geology of the Pacific Northwest
