= Pearl Falls =

Waterfall in Washington (state), United States

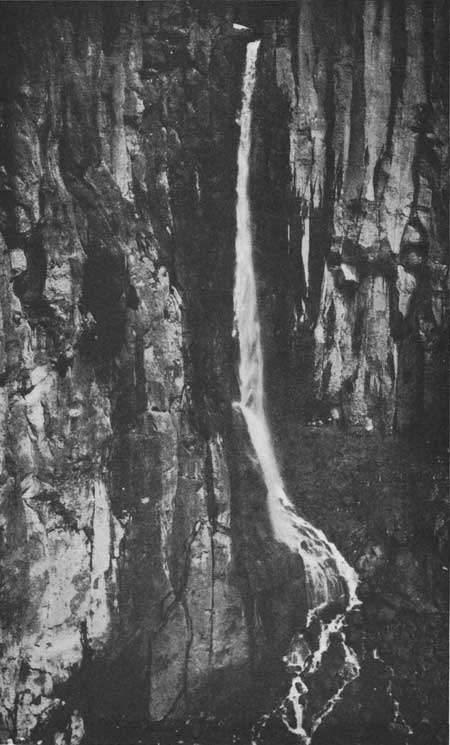
- Interactive map of Pearl Falls
- Location: Mount Rainier National Park, Pierce County, Washington, United States
- Coordinates: 46.8016°N 121.7994°W
- Type: Plunge
- Elevation: 5,739 ft (1,749 m)
- Total height: 400 ft (120 m)
- Number of drops: 1
- Longest drop: 400 ft (120 m)
- Total width: 10 ft (3.0 m)
- Average width: 10 ft (3.0 m)
- Watercourse: Pearl Creek
- Average flow rate: 50 cu ft/s (1.4 m^{3}/s)
- World height ranking: 646

Pearl Falls is one of the highest waterfalls in Mount Rainier National Park in the U.S. state of Washington. It is fed by the glacial Pearl Creek, occurring about halfway along the creek's course.

The falls plunge about 400 feet (120 m) off a sheer columnar basalt cliff, unbroken for almost 200 feet (61 m), into an amphitheater-like basin, similar in form to the main drop of nearby Comet Falls. The columnar basalt was likely formed by cooled eruptions of Mount Rainier, which is a stratovolcano. Near the base, it crashes onto a rock ledge and fans out towards the left bank, before dropping again vertically onto a pile of talus and cascading downwards. It is located in a steep canyon on the southwest face of Mount Rainier. Pearl Creek drains to another glacial stream, Pyramid Creek, which parallels then flows into Kautz Creek and finally into the Nisqually River. There are also more cascades below the main drop of Pearl Falls.

Access to the falls is extremely difficult, requiring at least two days to reach safely on foot. However, the falls can also be seen distantly from Ricksecker Point on the Mount Rainier Highway.

Pearl Falls was named in 1912 by Albert Henry Barnes, a photographer from Tacoma. He named the falls for the fact that its spray resembled pearls under the right lighting conditions. Pearl Creek presumably took its name from the falls.

On Kautz Creek only a few miles to the east, is Kautz Creek Falls.

== See also ==
- List of waterfalls
