= Mount Wow =

Mountain in Washington (state), United States

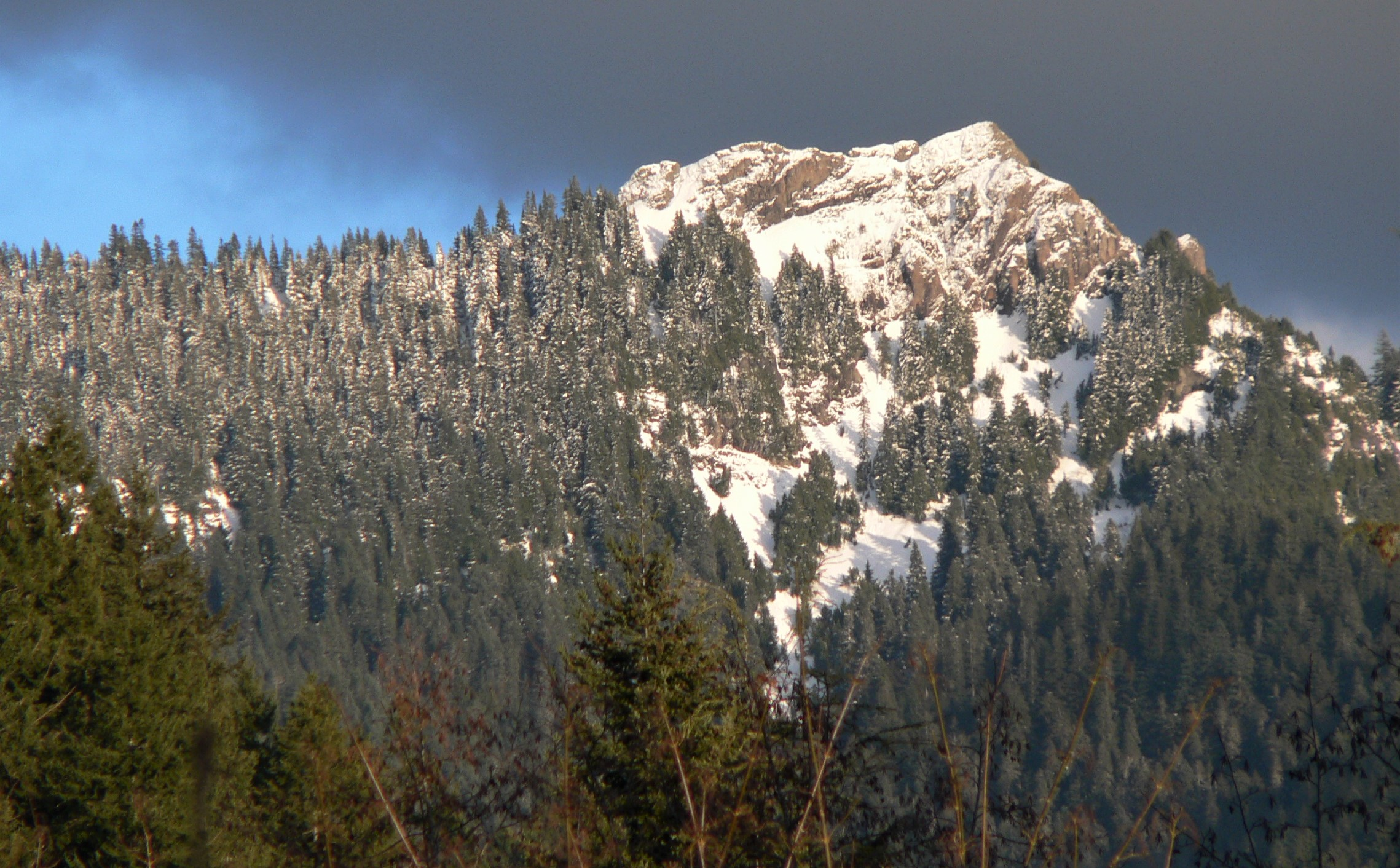
- West aspect, from Ashford

Highest point
- Elevation: 6,040 ft (1,840 m)
- Prominence: 2,120 ft (646 m)
- Parent peak: Iron Mountain (6,286 ft)
- Isolation: 3.62 mi (5.83 km)
- Coordinates: 46°46′23″N 121°53′55″W

Geography
- Location within Washington (state) Location within the United States
- Country: United States
- State: Washington
- County: Pierce
- Protected area: Mount Rainier National Park
- Parent range: Cascades
- Topo map: USGS Mount Wow

Climbing
- Easiest route: scrambling

Mount Wow is a prominent 6,040+ ft (1,840+ m) mountain summit located in the southwest corner of Mount Rainier National Park, in Pierce County of Washington state. It is part of the Cascade Range, and lies 8.6 mi (13.8 km) southwest of the summit of Mount Rainier. Its nearest higher neighbor is Iron Mountain, 3.6 mi (5.8 km) to the east-northeast. Precipitation runoff from Mount Wow is drained by Tahoma Creek on the east side of the mountain, whereas Goat Creek drains the west side of it, and both are tributaries of the Nisqually River.

== History ==
The "wow" name derives from a corruption of a Yakama word meaning "goat", and early tourists would often see mountain goats on this mountain's slopes. The name was officially adopted in 1913 by the United States Board on Geographic Names.

== Climate ==
Mount Wow is located in the marine west coast climate zone of western North America. Most weather fronts originating in the Pacific Ocean travel northeast toward the Cascade Mountains. As fronts approach, they are forced upward by the peaks of the Cascade Range (orographic lift), causing them to drop their moisture in the form of rain or snow onto the Cascades. As a result, the west side of the Cascades experiences high precipitation, especially during the winter months in the form of snowfall. Because of maritime influence, snow tends to be wet and heavy, resulting in high avalanche danger. During winter months, weather is usually cloudy, but due to high pressure systems over the Pacific Ocean that intensify during summer months, there is often little or no cloud cover during the summer. The months of July through September offer the most favorable weather for viewing or climbing this peak.

== See also ==
- Geology of the Pacific Northwest
- Tumtum Peak

== Gallery ==
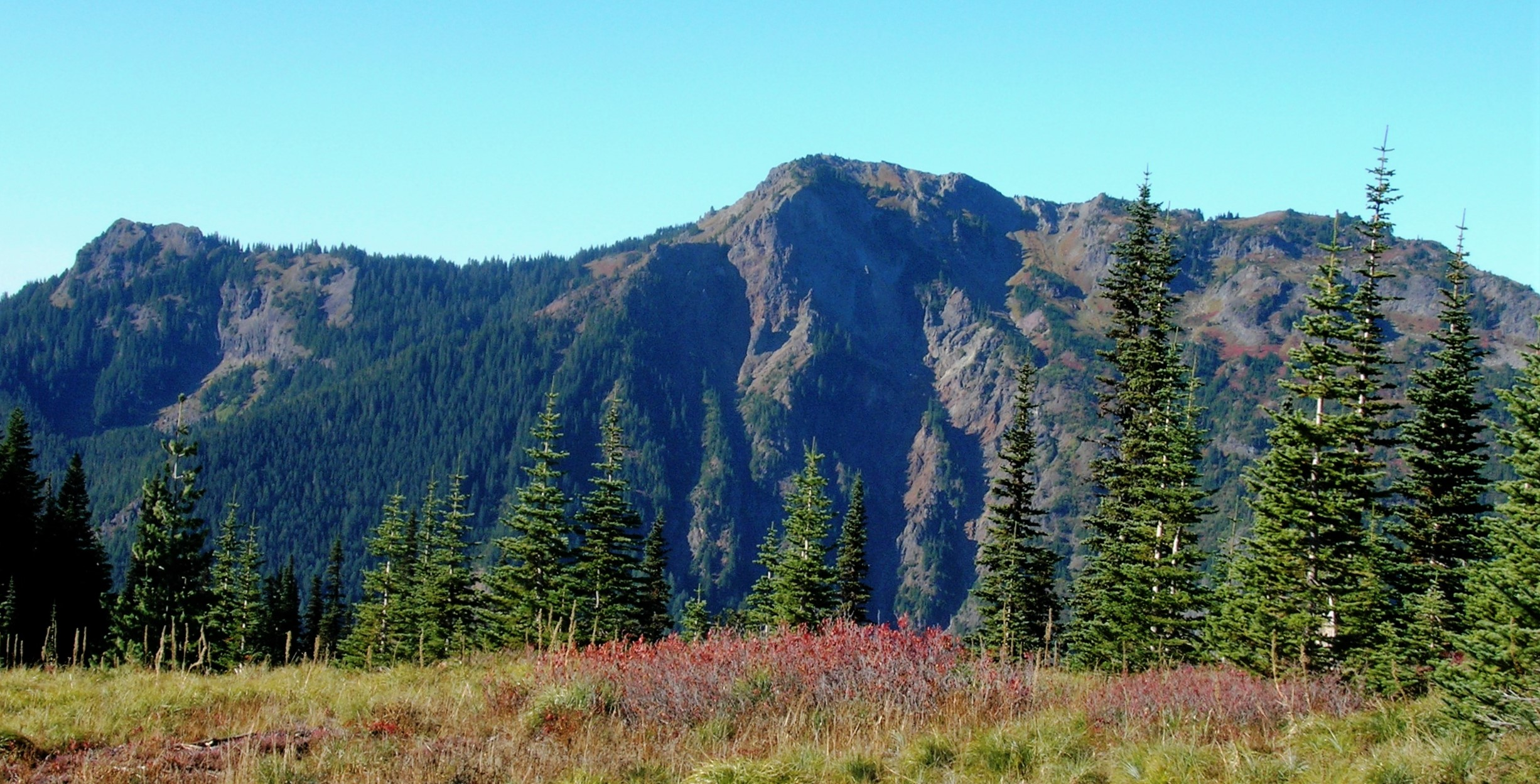
Mt. Wow from the east

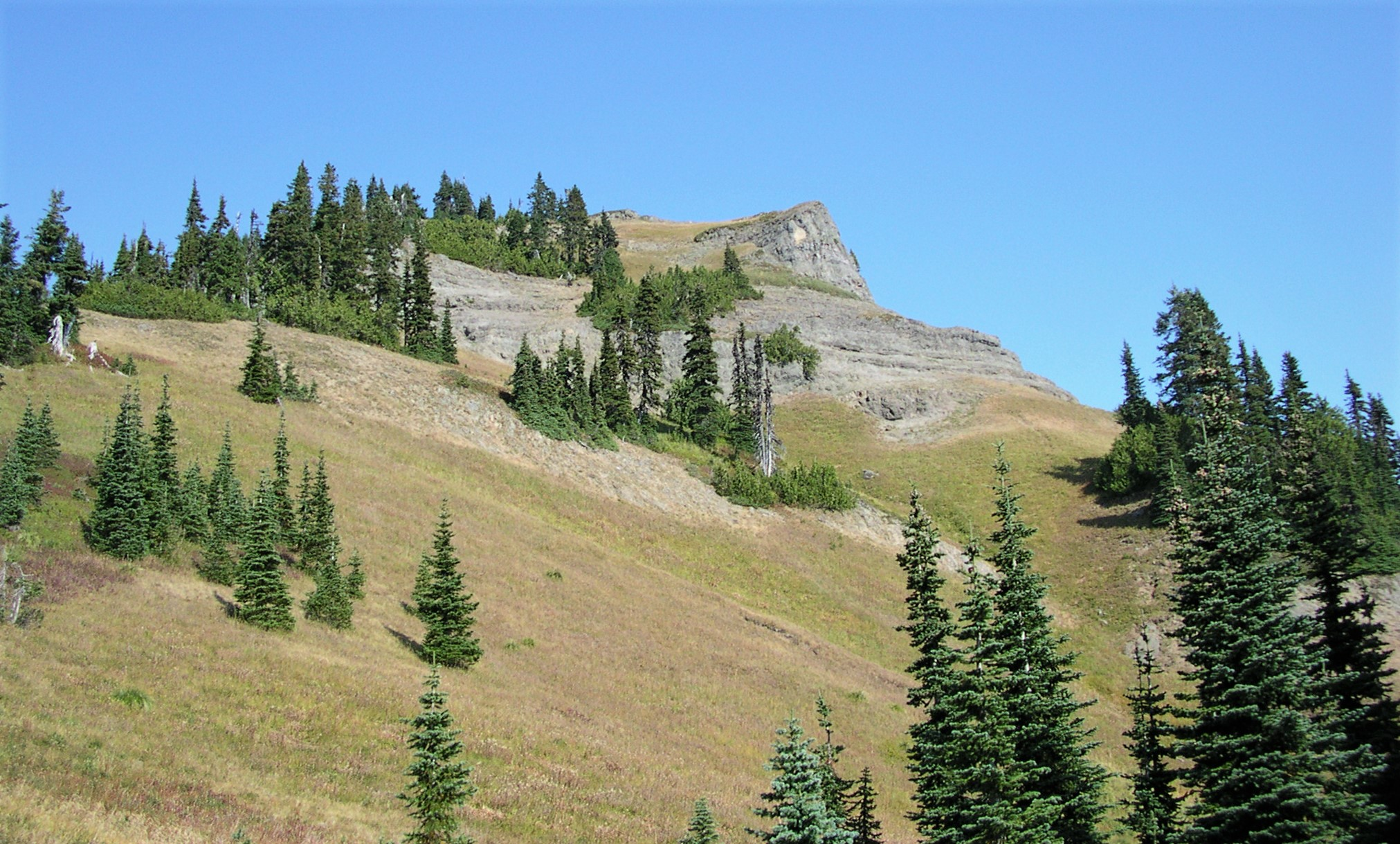
Ascending the southwest ridge
