= Success Glacier =

Glacier in the United States

- Interactive map of Success Glacier
- Type: Mountain glacier
- Location: Mount Rainier, Pierce County, Washington, USA
- Coordinates: 46°49′54″N 121°46′47″W
- Area: 0.3 square miles (0.8 km^{2}), 1983

The Success Glacier is a small glacier located on the southwestern slopes of Mount Rainier in Washington. It covers 0.3 square miles (0.8 km^{2}) and contains 500 million cubic feet (14 million m^{3}) of ice. The glacier is bounded to the northwest by the Success Cleaver and to the east by the Kautz Cleaver. Starting from a steep rocky slope at about 11,000 feet (3,400 m), the glacier flows southward downhill. At around 9,000 feet (2,700 m), a small snowfield joins with a glacier named the Pyramid Glacier to the southwest. Soon after this point, the glacier joins the adjacent Kautz Glacier at 8,600 feet (2,600 m). The joined glaciers flow until their terminus at about 6,000 ft (1,800 m). Meltwater from the glacier drains into the Nisqually River.

== See also ==
- List of glaciers
