= Nisqually Glacier =

Glacier located on the face of Mount Rainier

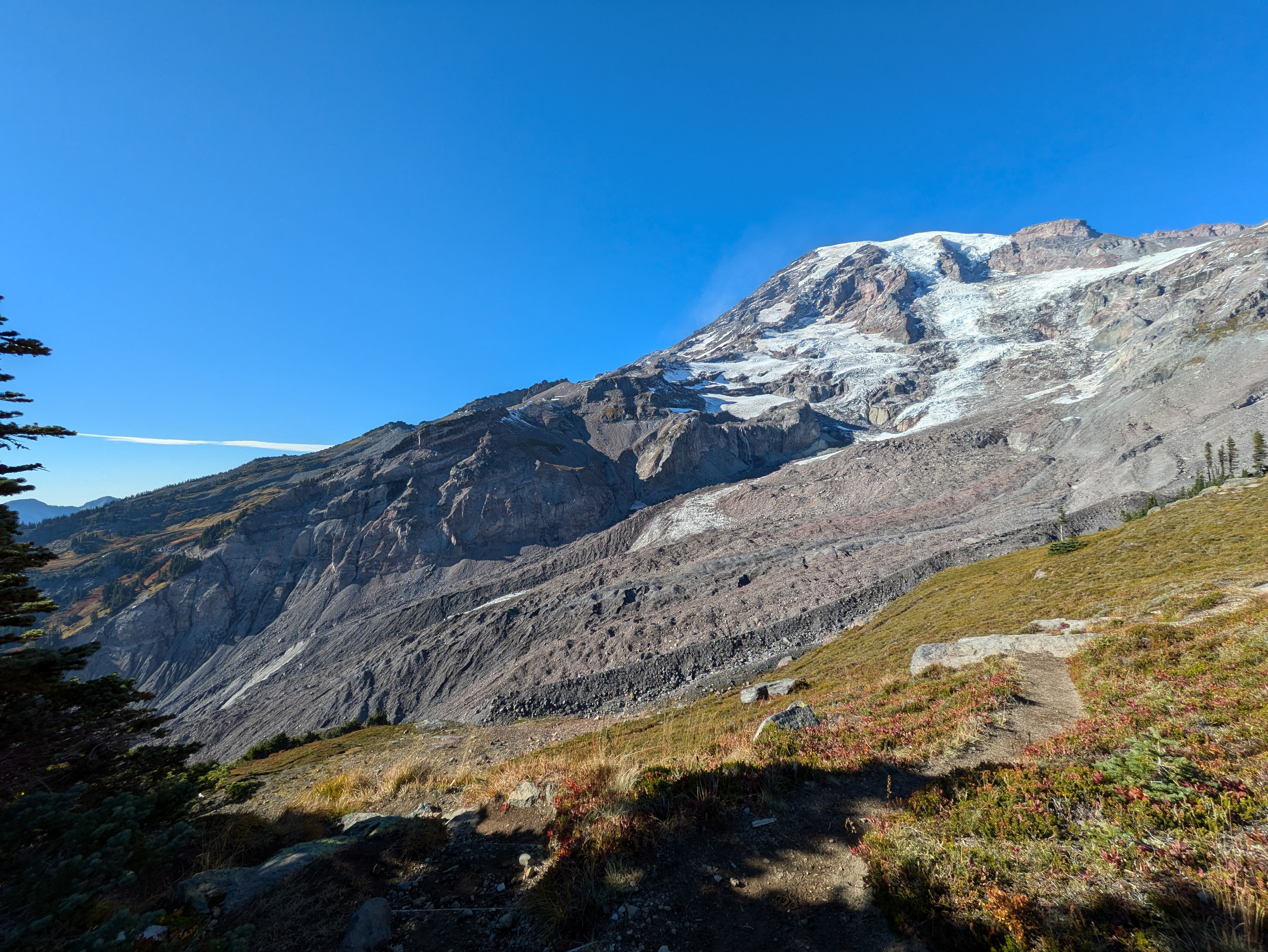
- Nisqually Glacier in center background from above Paradise, October 2024
- Interactive map of Nisqually Glacier
- Type: Mountain glacier
- Location: Mount Rainier National Park, Pierce County, Washington, USA
- Coordinates: 46°50′05″N 121°44′47″W
- Area: 1.8 sq mi (4.7 km^{2}) in 1983
- Length: 4 mi (6.4 km)
- Terminus: moraine
- Status: Retreating

The Nisqually Glacier is one of the larger glaciers on the southwestern face of Mount Rainier in the U.S. state of Washington. The glacier is one of the most easily viewed on the mountain, and is accessible from the Paradise visitor facilities in Mount Rainier National Park. Nisqually Glacier is the source of the Nisqually River.

Perhaps the longest studied glacier on Mount Rainier, Nisqually's terminal point has been measured annually since 1918. In May 1970, the glacier was measured to be moving at an average of 29 inches (740 mm) per day. Between 1896 and 2021, the glacier shrank from 3.871 square miles (10.03 km^{2}) to 1.584 square miles (4.10 km^{2}).

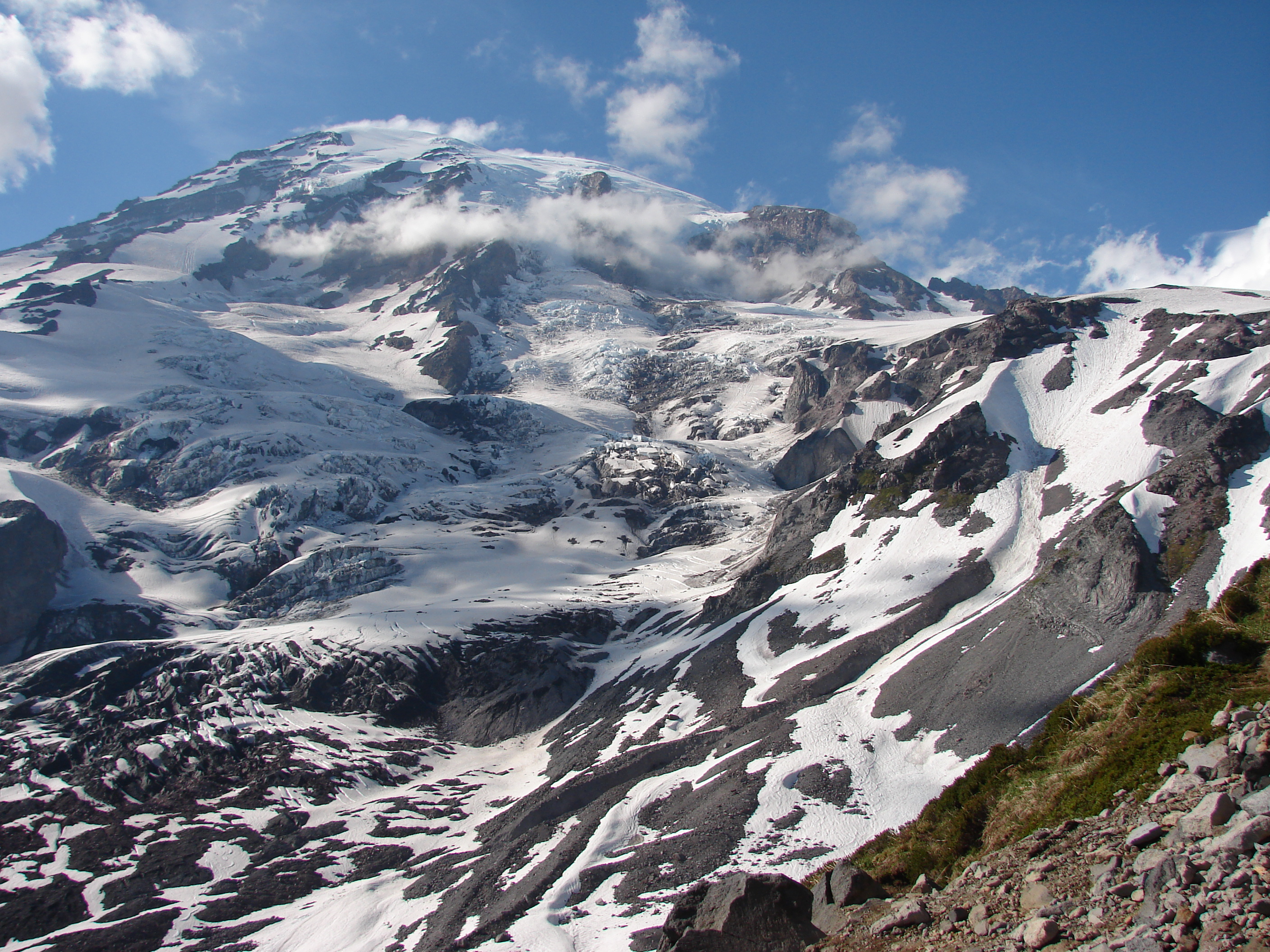
Nisqually Glacier from Glacier Vista

== Development ==
Nisqually Glacier has advanced and retreated three times during the end of the 20th Century. The recent retreat began in 1985. In the next six years, the glacier thinned by 52 feet (16 m) west of Glacier Vista.

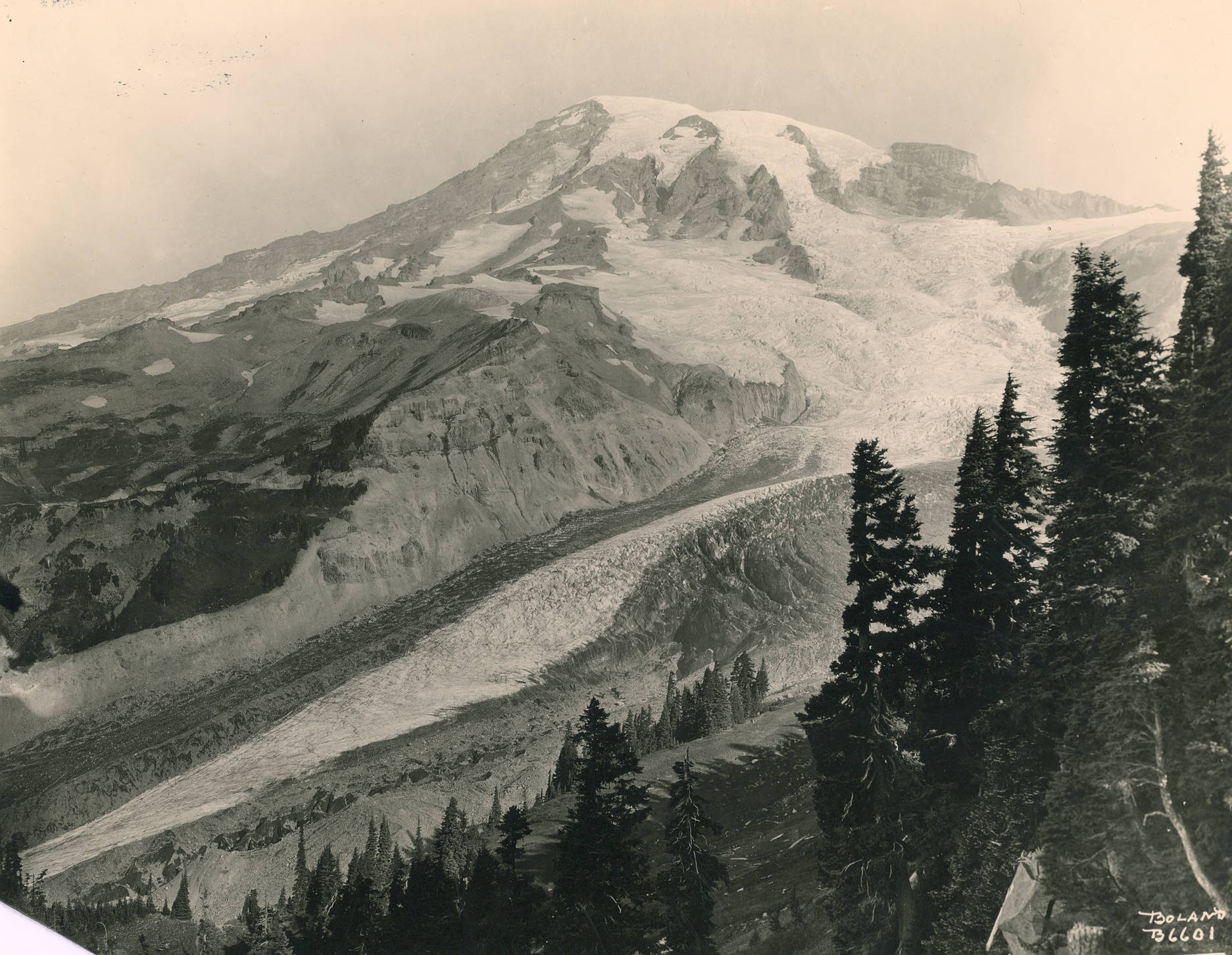
Nisqually Glacier in 1922.

The glacier reached its greatest extent by 1850, when many of the glaciers reached their furthest extent down valley. The 1850s is considered the Little Ice Age. Nisqually Glacier reached 650 to 800 feet (200 to 240 m) feet below the Glacier Bridge. On the west, Tahoma and South Tahoma Glaciers joined below Glacier Island along the Wonderland Trail. Emmons Glacier on the northeast reached within 1.2 miles (1.9 km) of the White River Campground.

With the end of the Little Ice Age these glaciers began a slow retreat. After 1920 the rate of shrinkage sped up. In the 100 years since the height of the Little Ice Age and 1950, Mount Rainier lost about one-quarter its glaciers. After 1950 until the 1980s the larger glaciers made small advances. Since the 1980s, many glaciers have been thinning and retreating.

== Debris flows ==
The glacier is one of four on Mount Rainier that are known to have released debris flows. Similar flows have stemmed from the Winthrop, Kautz, and South Tahoma glaciers as well.

== See also ==
- List of glaciers

== Bibliography ==
- Giles, G. C., 1960, Nisqually Glacier, Mount Rainier, Washington, 1959 Progress Report: U.S. Geol. Survey, Tacoma, Wash., open-file report, 31 p.
- Harrison, A. E., 1956, Fluctuations of the Nisqually Glacier, Mt. Rainier, Washington, since 1750: Jour. Glaciology, v. 2, no. 19, p. 675-683.
- Hofmann, Walther, 1958, Der Vorstoss des Nisqually-Gletschers am Mt. Rainier, USA, von 1952 bis 1956: Zeitschr. Gletscherkunde u. Glazialgeologie, v. 4, no. 1–2, p. 47-60.
- Johnson, Arthur, 1949, Nisqually Glacier, Washington, Progress Report 1946, 1947, and 1948: U.S. Geological Survey, Tacoma, Wash., report on file, 3 p.
- Johnson, Arthur, 1960, Variation in surface elevation of the Nisqually Glacier, Mt. Rainier, Washington: Internat. Assoc. Sci. Hydrology Bull. 19, p. 54-60.
- Meier, M. F., 1968, Calculations of slip of Nisqually Glacier on its bed-No simple relation of sliding velocity to shear stress: Internat. Assoc. Sci. Hydrology, Bern Assembly 1967. Pub. 79, p. 49-57.
- Russell, I. C., 1898, Glaciers of Mount Rainier: U.S. Geol. Survey 18th Ann. Rept. 1896–97, pt. 2, p. 355-415.
