= Mineral Mountain (Mount Rainier National Park) =

Mountain in Washington (state), United States

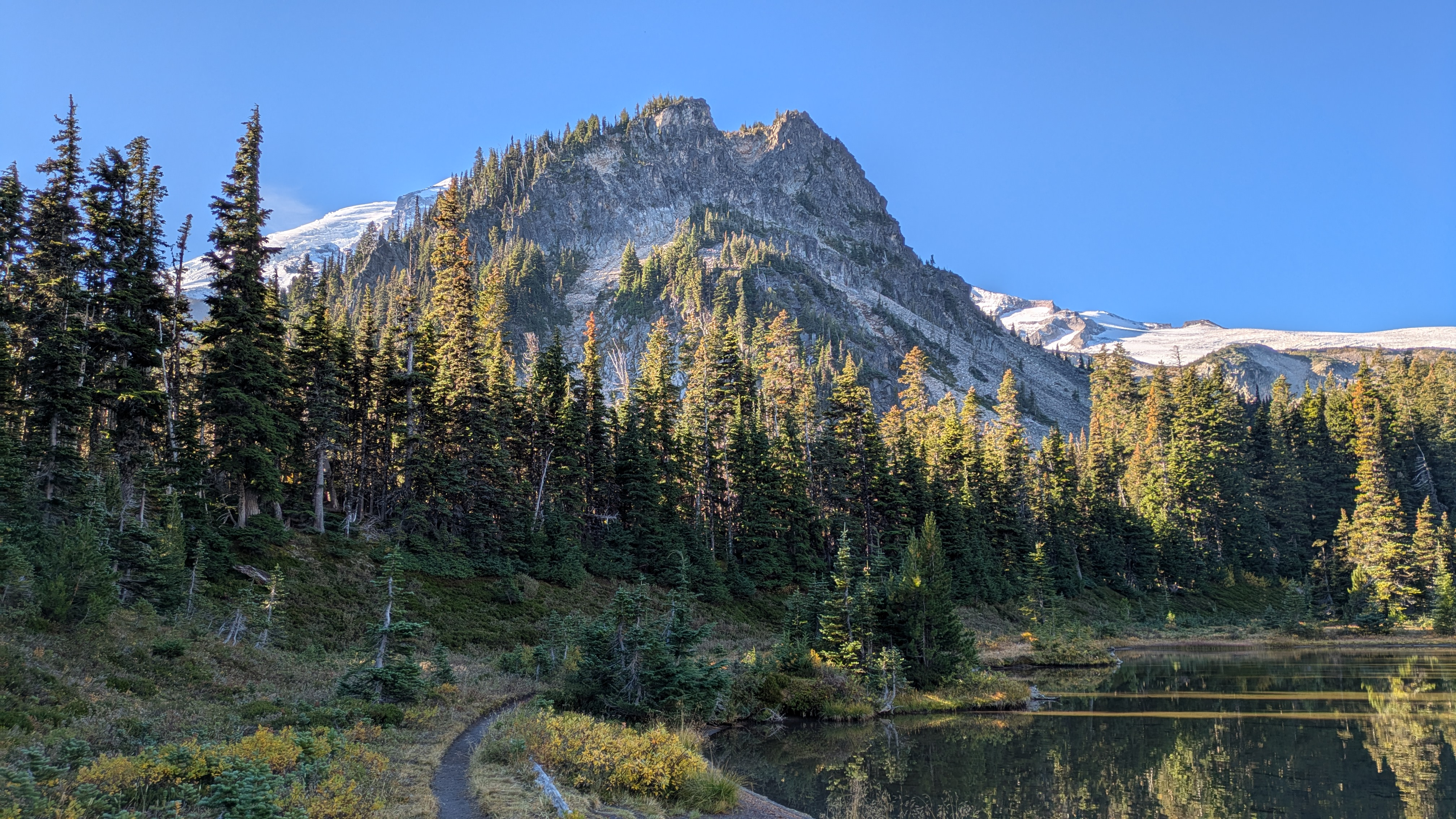
- Mineral Mountain from Mystic Lake

Highest point
- Elevation: 6,503 ft (1,982 m)
- Prominence: 100 ft (30 m)
- Parent peak: Old Desolate (7,137 ft)
- Isolation: 1.16 mi (1.87 km)
- Coordinates: 46°54′31″N 121°45′19″W

Geography
- Location within Washington (state) Location within the United States
- Location: Mount Rainier National Park; Pierce County, Washington, US
- Parent range: Cascades
- Topo map: USGS Sunrise

Climbing
- Easiest route: scrambling from Mystic Lake

Mineral Mountain is a 6,503 feet (1,982 m) mountain in Mount Rainier National Park, in Pierce County of Washington state. It is part of the Cascade Range, and lies 5 mi (8.0 km) due north of the summit of Mount Rainier. The Wonderland Trail provides an approach to this mountain, and the summit offers views of Old Desolate and the Winthrop and Carbon glaciers on Mount Rainier. Old Desolate is its nearest higher neighbor, 1.16 mi (1.87 km) to the southeast.

== History ==
The descriptive name Mineral Mountain derives from the hope to find minerals there. The name was officially adopted in 1932 by the United States Board on Geographic Names.

== Climate ==
Mineral Mountain is located in the marine west coast climate zone of western North America. Most weather fronts originate in the Pacific Ocean, and travel northeast toward the Cascade Mountains. As fronts approach, they are forced upward by the peaks of the Cascade Range (Orographic lift), causing them to drop their moisture in the form of rain or snowfall onto the Cascades. As a result, the west side of the Cascades experiences high precipitation, especially during the winter months in the form of snowfall. During winter months, weather is usually cloudy, but, due to high pressure systems over the Pacific Ocean that intensify during summer months, there is often little or no cloud cover during the summer. The months July through September offer the most favorable weather for viewing or climbing this peak.

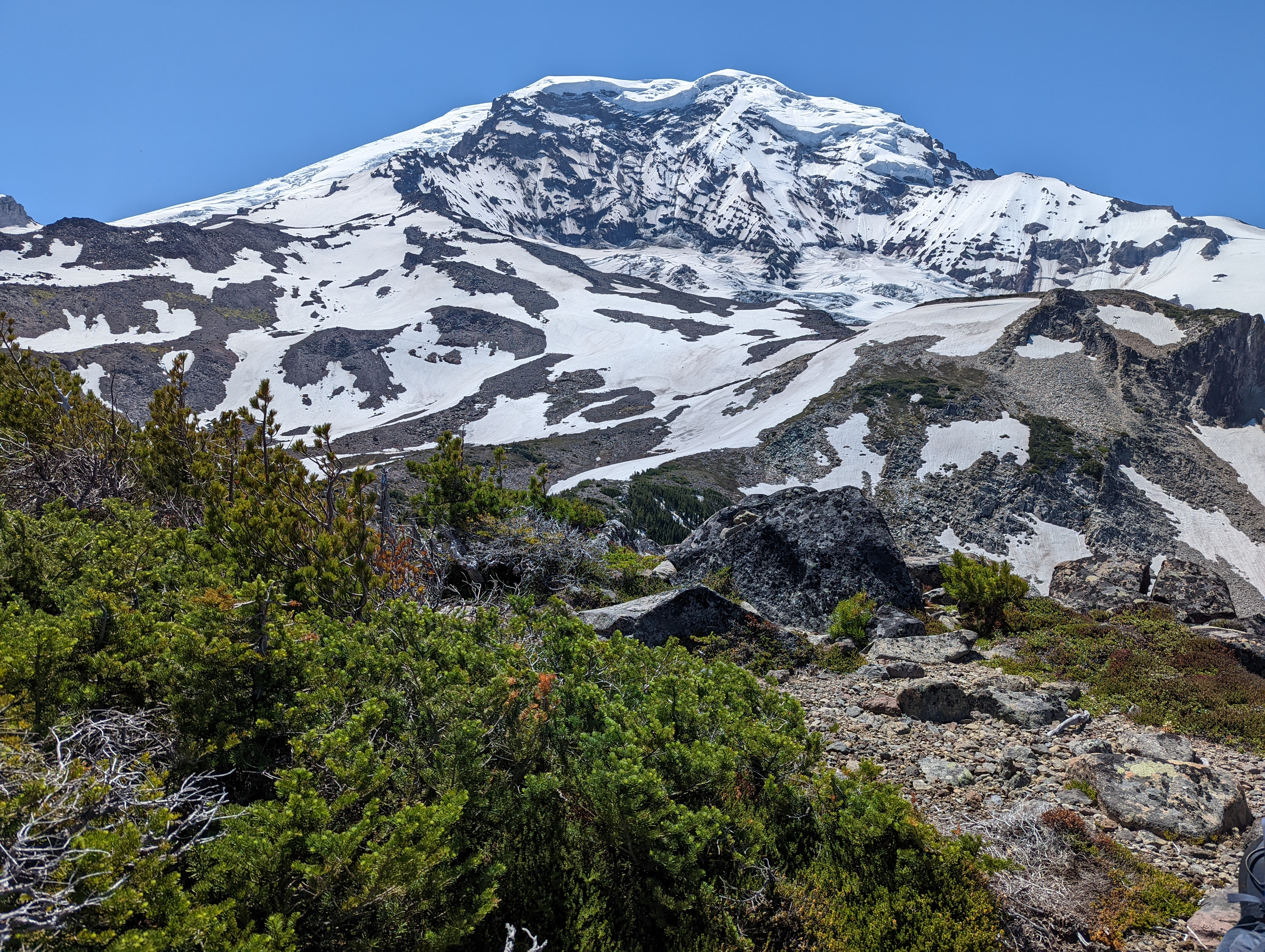
Mineral Mountain summit with Mt. Rainier in the background

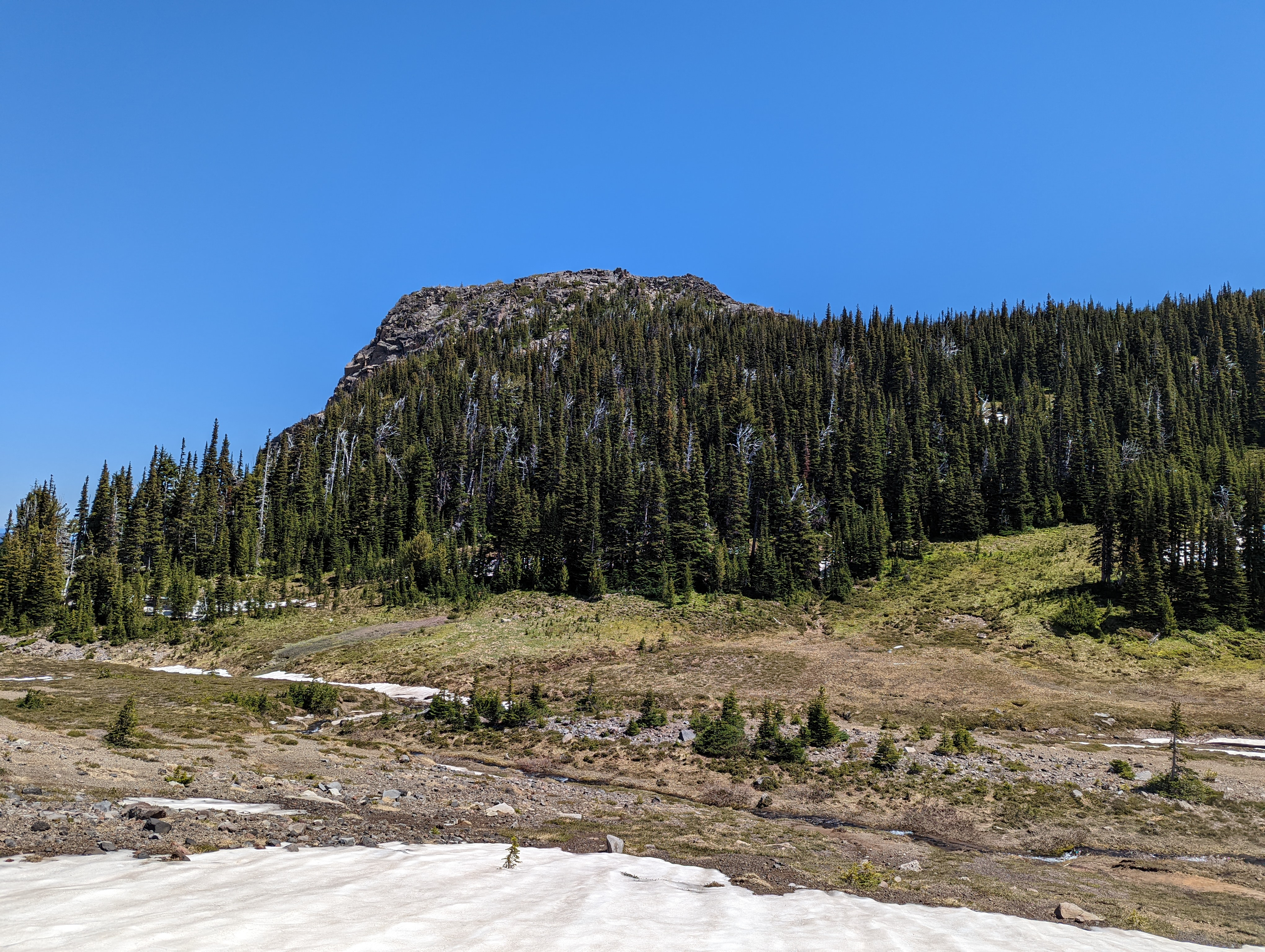
Mineral Mountain viewed from the west

== See also ==
- Geology of the Pacific Northwest
