= Winthrop Glacier =

Glacier in the United States

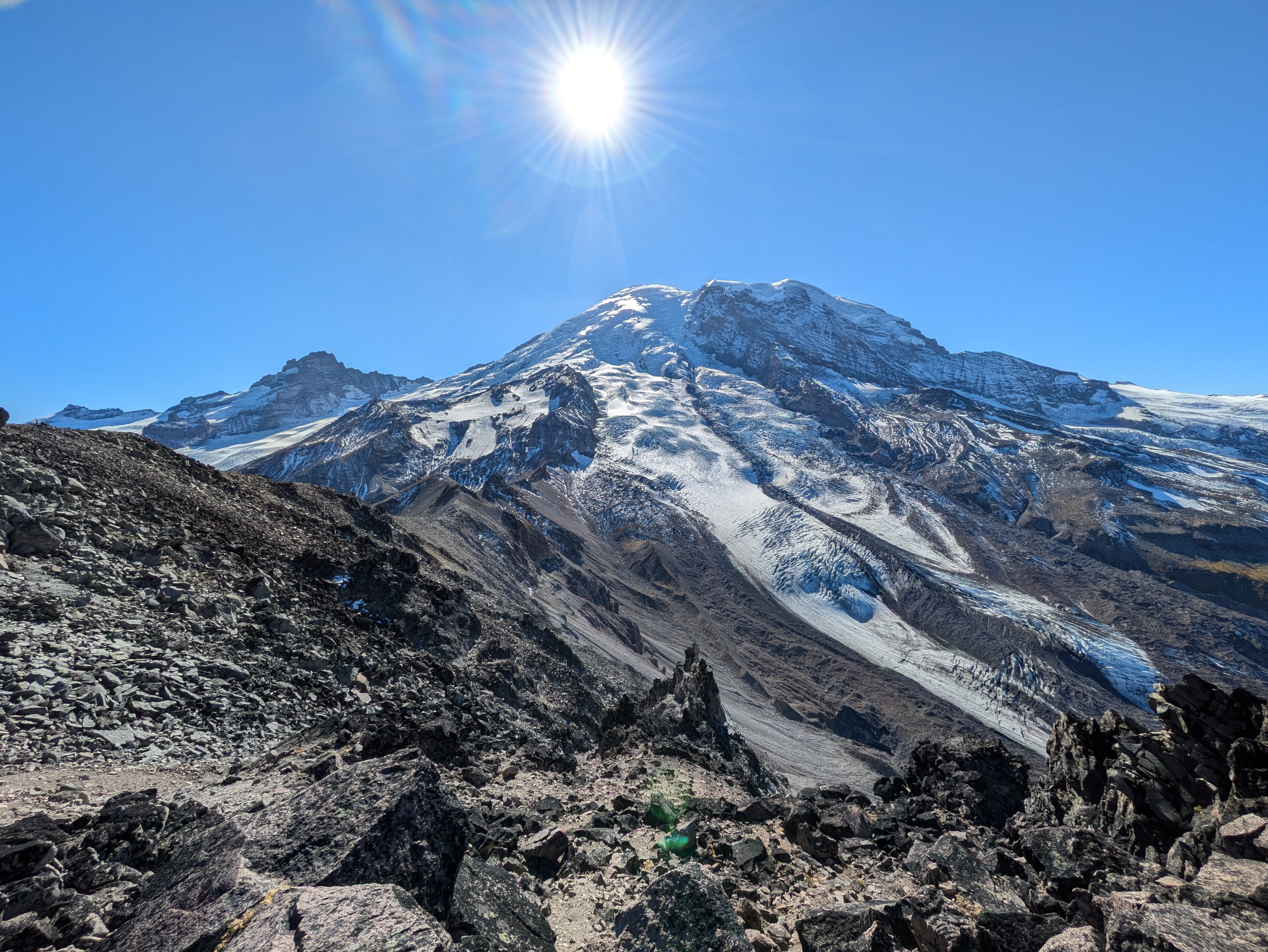
- Winthrop Glacier in the center of the picture, October 2024
- Interactive map of Winthrop Glacier
- Type: Mountain glacier
- Location: Mount Rainier, Pierce County, Washington, USA
- Coordinates: 46°52′34″N 121°44′31″W
- Area: 3.5 square miles (9.1 km^{2}), 1983

The Winthrop Glacier is a large glacier on the northeastern side of Mount Rainier in Washington. Named after Theodore Winthrop, the body of ice covers 3.5 mile^{2} (9.1 km^{2}) and has a volume of 18.5 billion feet^{3} (523 million m^{3}). Starting at over 14,300 feet (4,400 m) at the Columbia Crest, the glacier heads north and descends steeply over the uneven topography of Rainier. Another glacier, the Emmons Glacier is directly connected to this glacier up to the Steamboat Prow. After passing the Prow, the glaciers split up; the Emmons heads east-northeastward and the Winthrop continues northeast. As the terrain becomes flatter, the Winthrop glacier becomes heavily rock-covered when it terminates in a forest at about 4,900 ft (1,500 m). Meltwater from the glacier drains into the White River.

== Debris flows ==
The glacier is one of four on Mount Rainier that are known to have released debris flows. Similar flows have stemmed from the Nisqually, Kautz, and South Tahoma glaciers as well.

== See also ==
- List of glaciers
