= Kautz Creek Falls =

Waterfall in Washington (state), United States

- Interactive map of Kautz Creek Falls
- Location: Mount Rainier National Park, Pierce County, Washington
- Coordinates: 46.8104°N 121.7810°W
- Type: Tiered
- Total height: 400 feet (120 m)
- Number of drops: 4
- Total width: 15 feet (4.6 m)
- Watercourse: Kautz Creek

Kautz Creek Falls is a waterfall on Kautz Creek in the Mount Rainier National Park in the state of Washington. It was formed when the Kautz Glacier retreated in the last 50 years, creating a series of long and slender cascades totaling about 400 feet (120 m) in height down a tall glacial cliff, with a highest drop of 150 feet (46 m). The falls consist of two parts, each with two distinct tiers. One of these parts flows from the upper lobe of the Kautz Glacier and disappears under the lower lobe. The water flowing over this stage is generally clear. As the water passes underneath the lower lobe, however; it has a muddy appearance caused by glacial moraine, which explains the muddy appearance of Kautz Creek.

On Pearl Creek (a sub-tributary of Kautz Creek) a few miles to the west, is Pearl Falls.

== See also ==
- List of waterfalls
