= Iron Mountain (Pierce County, Washington) =

Mountain in Washington (state), United States

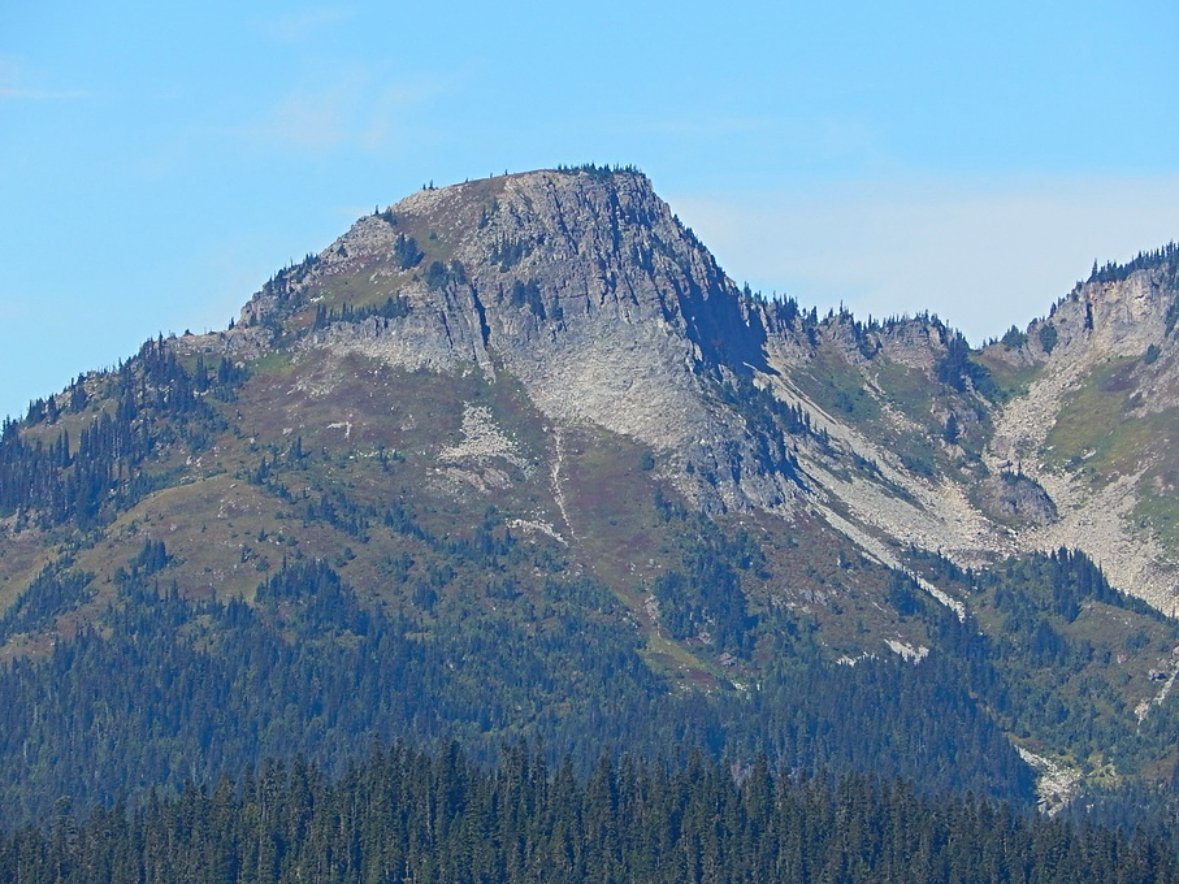
- Iron Mountain seen from the southeast

Highest point
- Elevation: 6,286 ft (1,916 m)
- Prominence: 303 ft (92 m)
- Parent peak: Copper Mountain
- Isolation: 0.30 mi (0.48 km)
- Coordinates: 46°47′35″N 121°49′42″W

Geography
- Location within Washington (state) Location within the United States
- Country: United States
- State: Washington
- County: Pierce
- Protected area: Mount Rainier National Park
- Parent range: Cascades
- Topo map: USGS Mount Rainier West

Climbing
- Easiest route: Scrambling

Iron Mountain is a 6,286-foot (1,916-metre) mountain summit located in Mount Rainier National Park in Pierce County of Washington state. Part of the Cascade Range, it is situated near the base of the Success Cleaver, overlooking Indian Henry's Hunting Ground. The nearest higher neighbor is Copper Mountain, 0.3 miles (0.48 km) to the north. The summit provides views of Mount Rainier, Mount Adams, Mount St. Helens, Mount Wow, and peaks of the Tatoosh Range. Precipitation runoff from Iron Mountain drains into Tahoma Creek, Devils Dream Creek, and Fishers Horn Pipe Creek, which are all tributaries of the Nisqually River. There were great hopes in the late 1800s that mines on Mount Rainier could be a source of precious metals such as copper, silver, and gold. Dark reddish rock found on Iron Mountain was thought to be iron or iron oxide. The toponym was officially adopted in 1932 by the United States Board on Geographic Names.

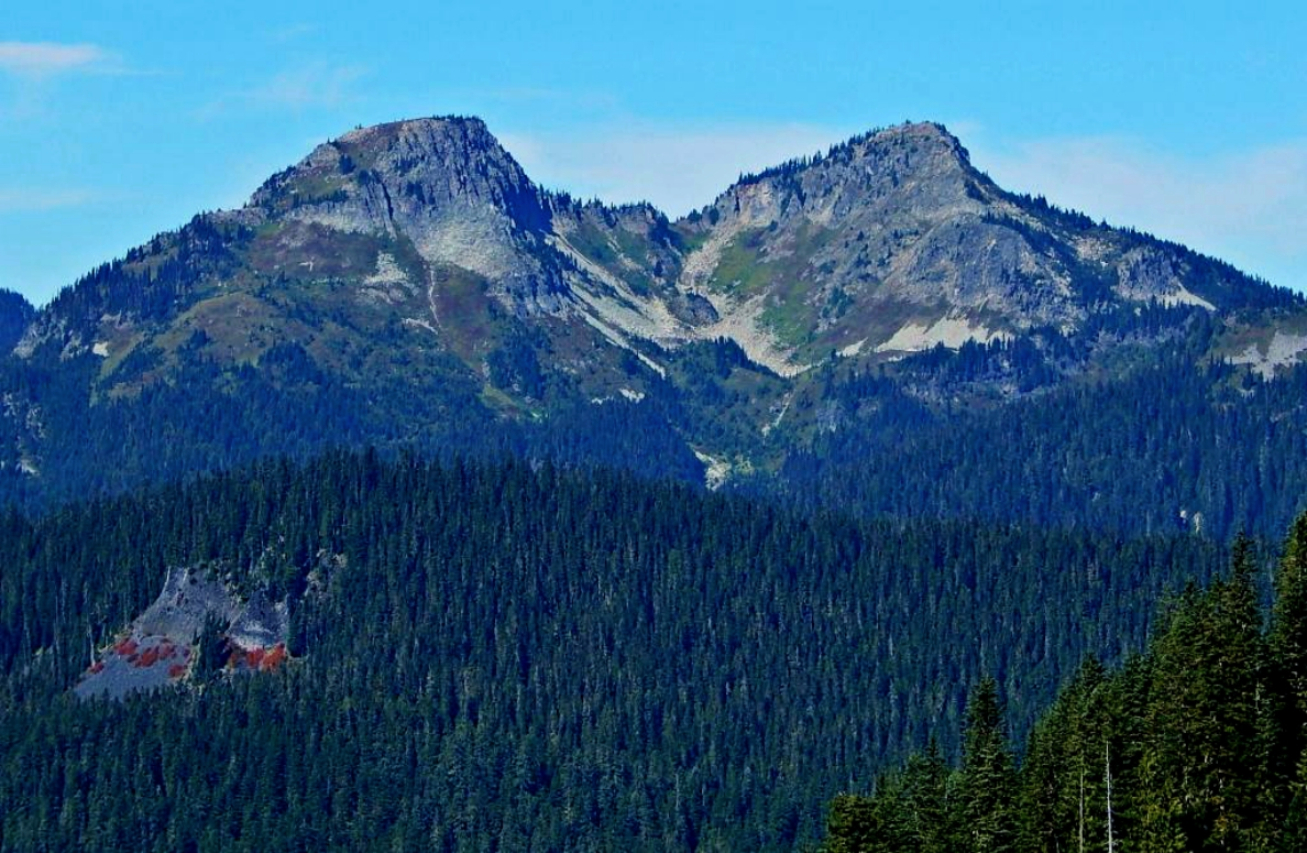
Iron Mountain (left) and Copper Mountain

== Climate ==
Iron Mountain is located in the marine west coast climate zone of western North America. Most weather fronts originating in the Pacific Ocean travel northeast toward the Cascade Mountains. As fronts approach, they are forced upward by the peaks of the Cascade Range (orographic lift), causing them to drop their moisture in the form of rain or snow onto the Cascades. As a result, the west side of the Cascades experiences high precipitation, especially during the winter months in the form of snowfall. Because of maritime influence, snow tends to be wet and heavy, resulting in high avalanche danger. During winter months, weather is usually cloudy, but due to high pressure systems over the Pacific Ocean that intensify during summer months, there is often little or no cloud cover during the summer.

== See also ==
- Geography of Washington (state)
- Geology of the Pacific Northwest
