= Kautz Glacier =

Glacier in the United States

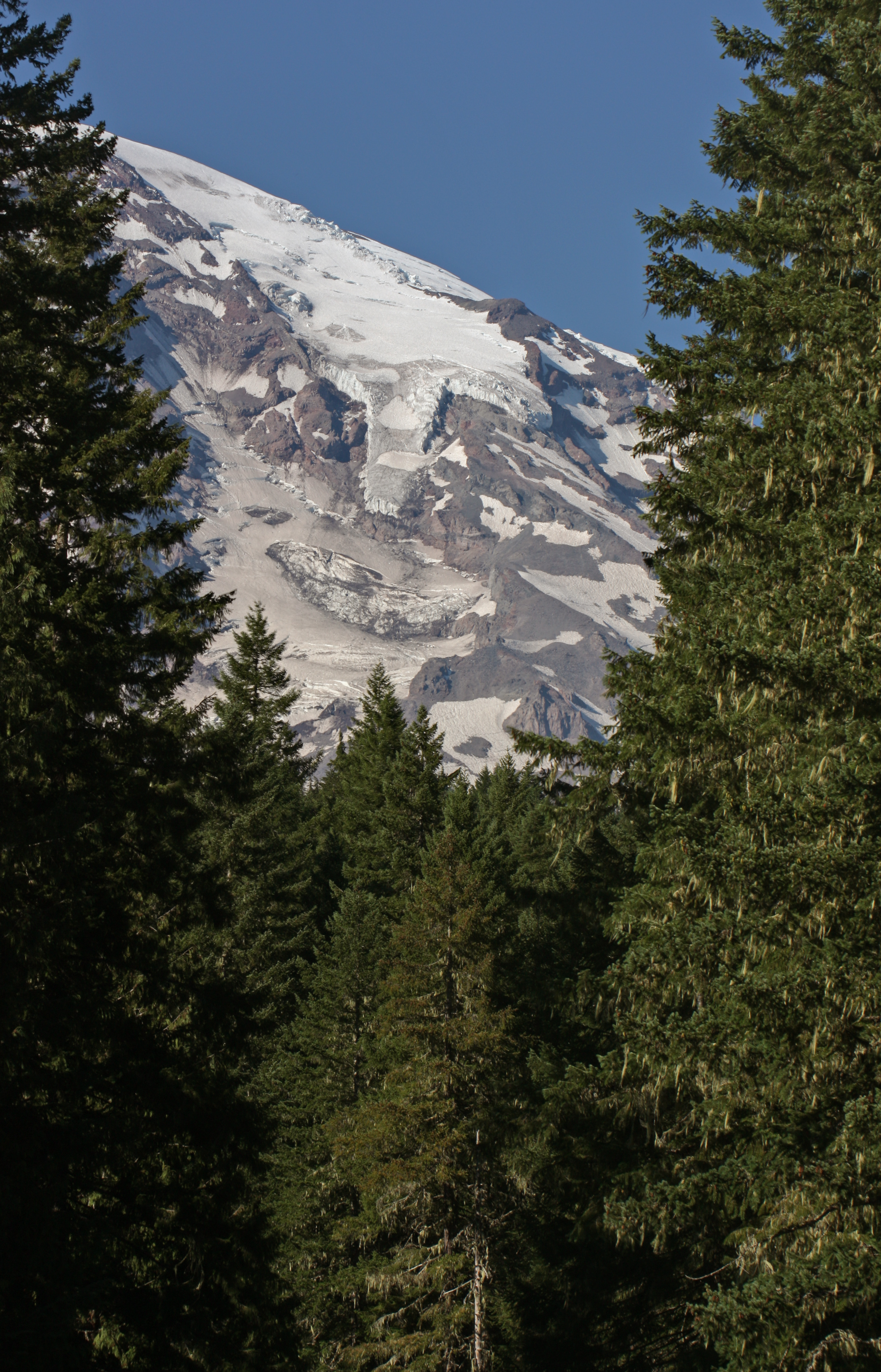
- Upper Kautz Glacier descends from the summit ice cap to Kautz Ice Cliff. The lower glacier (left center) descends from the Kautz Glacier Headwall (upper left).
- Interactive map of Kautz Glacier
- Type: Mountain glacier
- Location: Mount Rainier, Pierce County, Washington, USA
- Coordinates: 46°49′41″N 121°46′14″W
- Area: 1.8 square miles (4.7 km^{2}), 1983

The Kautz Glacier is a narrow glacier on the southern flank of Mount Rainier in Washington. Named for August Kautz, who is sometimes credited for the first ascent of Mount Rainier, covers 1.8 square miles (4.7 km^{2}) and contains 7.8 billion ft^{3} (221 million m^{3}) of ice. Upper Kautz Glacier extends south from the summit ice cap to Kautz Ice Cliff at about 11,700 feet (3,600 m). Immediately west of the main ice cliff, the glacier continues down Kautz Chute which terminates in another ice cliff just above the lower Kautz Glacier at 10,800 feet (3,300 m). Usually reached by a short descent from Camp Hazard at 11,300 feet (3,400 m) on Wapowety Cleaver, climbers following the Kautz Glacier climbing route ascend this chute to the upper glacier.

Starting from the Kautz Glacier Headwall at about 12,500 feet (3,800 m), the lower glacier flows generally south-southwest between the Kautz and the Wapowety Cleaver. Just before it meets the Success Glacier, the Kautz makes a right turn and heads west for a short distance. After the two glaciers meet, the resultant glacier reaches down to about 6,000 ft (1,800 m) before terminating. Meltwater from the glacier drains into Kautz Creek Falls and into Kautz Creek, a tributary of the Nisqually River.

== Debris flows ==
The glacier is one of four on Mount Rainier that are known to have released debris flows. Similar flows have stemmed from the Nisqually, Winthrop, and South Tahoma glaciers as well. The glacier released a particularly large mudflow on October 2–3, 1947, when heavy rains melted and eroded the lower part of the glacier. The meltwater transformed into a 14 billion ft^{3} (40 million m^{3}) mudflow replete with large boulders up to 13 feet (4 m) in diameter. The flow buried Highway 706 in 28 feet (9 m) of sediment and watery debris. Deposits from the 1947 mudflow can still be seen today. Smaller flows occurred in the years 1961, 1985 and 1986.

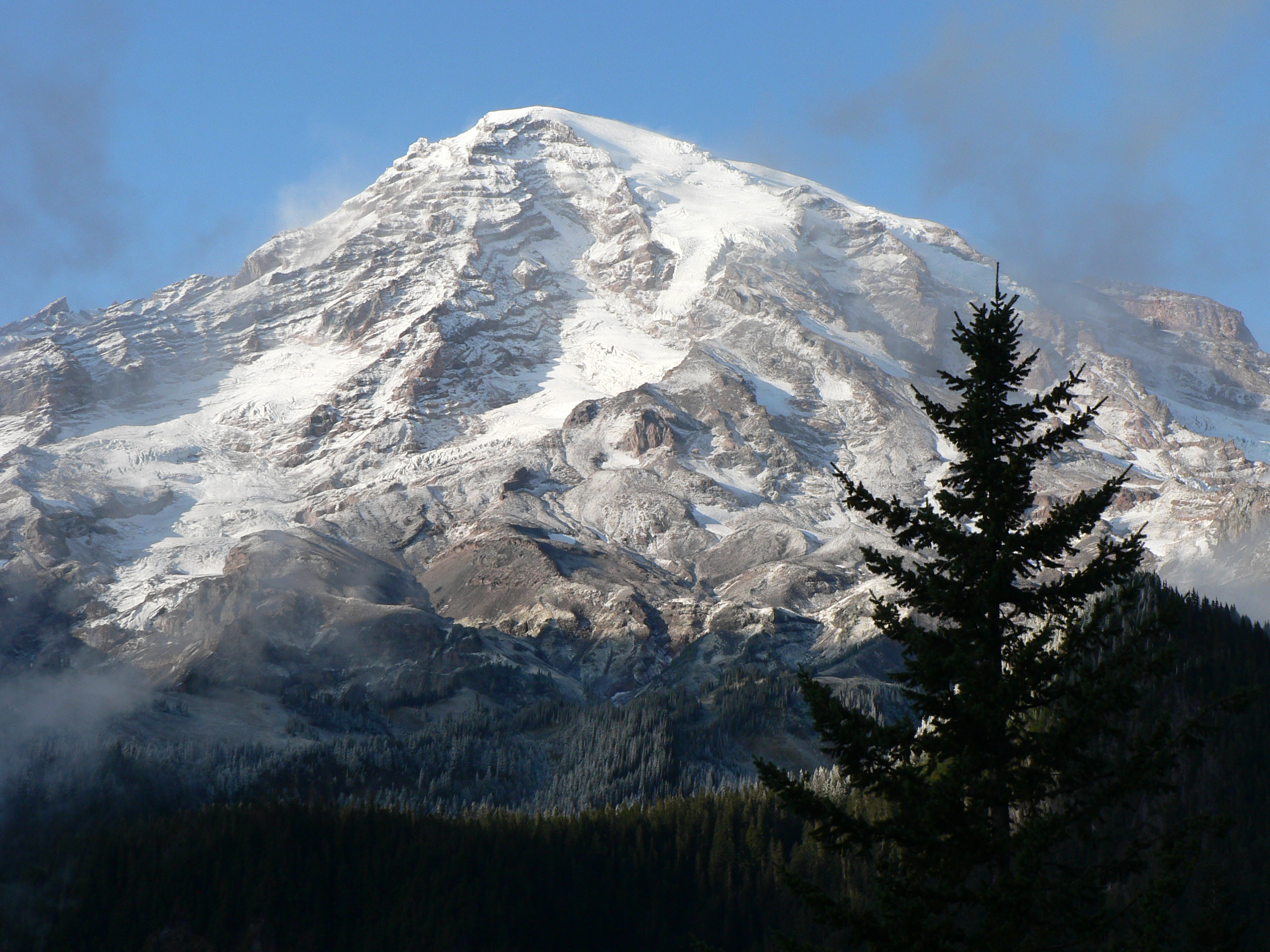
South face of Rainier featuring Kautz Glacier

== See also ==
- List of glaciers
