= South Tahoma Glacier =

Glacier in Washington, United States

- Interactive map of South Tahoma Glacier
- Type: Mountain glacier
- Location: Mount Rainier, Pierce County, Washington, United States
- Coordinates: 46°49′27″N 121°48′17″W
- Area: 1.1 square miles (2.8 km^{2}), 1983

The South Tahoma Glacier is a glacier located on the southwest flank of Mount Rainier in State of Washington. It covers 1.1 square miles (2.8 km^{2}) and contains 4.6 billion ft^{3} (130 million m^{3}) of ice. Starting from an elevation of around 10,600 feet (3,200 m) at the base of a steep cliff, the glacier flows down southwest with the larger, adjacent Tahoma Glacier lying to the north. The smaller South Tahoma is connected to the Tahoma at an ice patch located in midway down the South Tahoma. From then on, the glacier narrows and flows down southwest and accumulates rock debris before turning and ending at an elevation of around 5,100 feet (1,600 m). The southern ice stream used to be connected to a northern ice stream coming down south from the Tahoma Glacier encompassing a jagged 7,690 feet (2,344 m) high sub-peak of Rainier called Glacier Island, but retreat has separated the glaciers at an elevation below 8,000 ft (2,400 m). Meltwater from the glacier drains into the Nisqually River.

== Debris flows ==
The glacier is one of four on Mount Rainier that are known to have released debris flows. Similar flows have stemmed from the Nisqually, Kautz, and Winthrop glaciers as well. The glacier has at least 23 recorded debris flows since 1967, with 15 reported between the years 1986 and 1992. The floods have caused damage and disruption to the roads and picnic areas downstream. In August 2015, a debris flow was caused by a glacial outburst flood when meltwater was released by the glacier. Part of the Westside Road was damaged by the debris flow.

== History ==
The South Tahoma Glacier is the site of the worst accident to have occurred on the slopes of Mount Rainier. In December 1946, 32 U.S. Marines were killed in a Curtiss R5C Commando military aircraft when it crashed into the glacier at the 10,500 foot (3,200 m) level in what was then the worst aviation accident in U.S. history. While much of the wreckage and 25 bodies were located during several recovery attempts throughout the following year, only small artifacts were recovered, including several Marines' medical records. The bodies and wreckage are presumably still buried in the glacier today.

== See also ==
- Tahoma Glacier
- List of glaciers
