= Kautz Creek =

Coordinates: 46°43′41″N 121°50′50″W

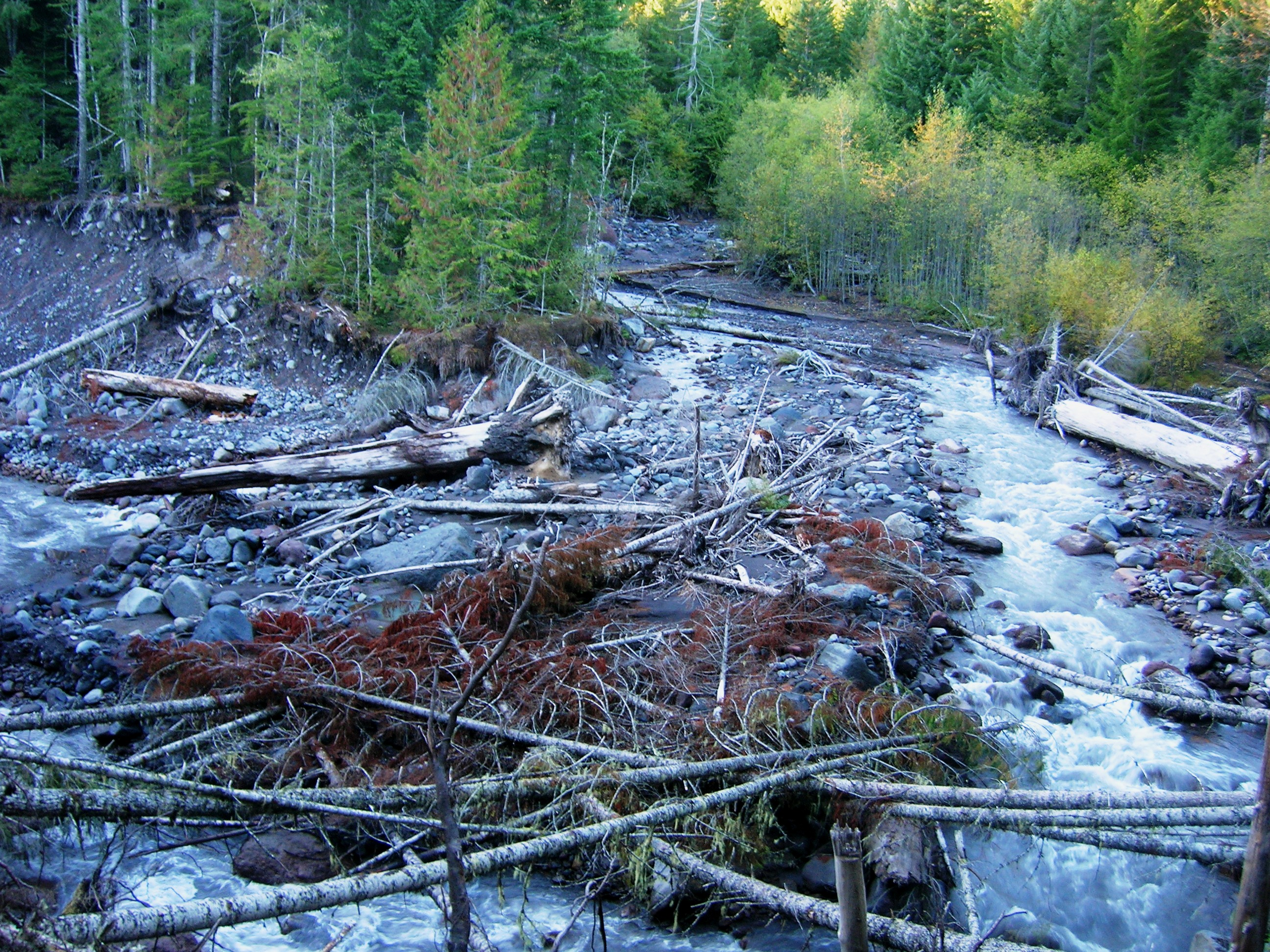
- Kautz Creek in Mount Rainier National Park, photographed in 2006.

Location
- Country: United States
- State: Washington
- National parks: Mount Rainier National Park

Physical characteristics
- Source
  - location: Kautz Glacier, Mount Rainier
- Mouth: Nisqually River
- Length: 6 mi (9.7 km)

Basin features
- Tributaries
  - right: Pyramid Creek, Pearl Creek

Kautz Creek is a tributary of the Nisqually River, flowing from the Kautz Glacier, with its watershed in the Mount Rainier National Park of Washington. It drains southwest from Mount Rainier for about 6 miles (9.7 km) before it joins the Nisqually River near Mount Rainier Highway. It is notable for being a severe flooding hazard due to the volume of summer glacier melt and its frequently changing course. The 400-foot (120 m) Kautz Creek Falls on the headwaters of the creek was formed by the retreat of the Kautz Glacier in the past 50 years.

Kautz Creek was named after A. V. Kautz, an army officer and mountain climber.

== Hydrology ==
The channel of Kautz Creek is very steep and narrow, because it has eroded through the relatively soft material that the lahars and mudflows have deposited. The creek flows in a trench that is 100 to 200 feet (30 to 61 m) wide and up to 75 feet (23 m) deep, and its course often changes during floods.

== Lahars ==
The creek is notorious for its history of severe floods and mudflows. On October 2 and 3, 1947, heavy rains triggered a jökulhaup (glacial lake outburst flood) from the Kautz Glacier- the largest flood after the establishment of the park. The flood (similar to a volcanic lahar) moved 40,000,000 cubic metres (1.4×10^{9} ft^{3}) of earth and boulders of up to 13 feet (4.0 m) in diameter for 6 miles (9.7 km). It buried the Nisqually-Longmire Road under 30 feet (9.1 m) of debris, and carved a canyon 300 feet (91 m) deep. Other large debris flows have occurred in the Kautz Creek watershed in 1961, 1985, and 1986, with small debris flows occurring more frequently. The creek also jumped its banks in November 2006, destroying parts of the Kautz Creek Trail.
