= Van Trump =

Van Trump may refer to:

== People ==
- Van Trump (surname)

== Places ==
United States

- Van Trump Creek, Washington
- Van Trump Falls, Washington
- Van Trump Glacier, Mount Rainier, Washington

== See also ==
- Trump (disambiguation)
