= Donald Trump endorsements =

Donald Trump endorsements may refer to:

- List of Donald Trump 2016 presidential campaign endorsements
- List of Donald Trump 2020 presidential campaign endorsements
- List of Donald Trump 2024 presidential campaign endorsements
- List of politicial endorsements by Donald Trump, candidates endorsed by Donald Trump

== See also ==
- Donald Trump (disambiguation)
