= Trump (surname) =

German-English surname

Trump is a surname of English and German origin. The German surname possibly originates from a word for "drum". It is notable as the surname of president of the United States Donald Trump, whose ancestors' surname was Drumpf. It has an older presence in the United States via the 18th-century Amish migration from the Palatinate to Pennsylvania. The English surname is derived from Old French trompeor "trumpeter" or "maker of trumpets" (modern surnames Trump and Trumper), recorded from the 1270s.

The majority of people with the surname live in the United States (close to 5,000 individuals, approximately 900 of whom live in Pennsylvania); the surname does survive in both Germany and England, but is comparatively rare (fewer than 500 individuals in each country).

== German surname ==
German name researcher (Lehrbeauftragter für Namenforschung) Hans Bahlow derived the German surname Trump from a Bavarian word for "drum" (Middle High German trumpe).

Trump as a contemporary German surname is comparatively rare, with 382 telephone book entries as of 2016 concentrated in the Cologne area, the Bad Dürkheim district, the Gifhorn district, and the Schwäbisch Hall/Ansbach region.

- Donald Trump (born 1946), president of the United States and businessman, grandson of Bavarian-born businessman Frederick Trump
  - Family of Donald Trump
- Georg Trump (1896–1985), German graphic, typeface, and postage stamp designer
- Peter Trump (born 1950), German field hockey player
- Walter Trump (born 1953), German mathematician

The German surname was introduced to the British colonial Province of Pennsylvania in 1733. Philip Thomas Trump was recorded as part of a group of Germans from the Palatinate. In the United States, there were close to 4,800 individuals with the surname on record as of 2016, Pennsylvania still accounting for close to one fifth of their number.

- Charles S. Trump (born 1960), West Virginia State Senator
- Chrystelle Bond (née Trump; 1938–2020), American dancer, choreographer, and dance historian
- Clifford Trump (born 1937), president of Idaho State University
- Donald L. Trump (born 1945), American oncologist
- Mary Lea Trump (born 1965), American clinical psychologist and author
- William Trump (1923–2009), American soldier

== English surname ==
The modern English surnames Trump, Tromp, and Trumper are derived from occupational names referring to "trumpet", either for trumpeters or trumpet-makers. Early attestations of the occupational name include references to one Patrick Trumpe in Cumbria (1275), to Adam Trumpur in Essex (also 1275), and to Nicholas Trump in Cambridgeshire (1279). One William Trompeur is recorded in London in 1320, and one John le Trumpour in Yorkshire in 1327. One of the Monmouth rebels transported to the West Indies in 1685 was Humphrey Trump of Membury, Devon. In modern English surnames Trump is localized in Southwestern England, especially Devon and Somerset. 429 individuals named Trump were reported for Great Britain as of 2016 (compared to 458 in 1881).

- David H. Trump (1931–2016), British archaeologist known for his work in the area of Maltese prehistory
- Dorothy Trump (1964–2013), English geneticist
- Gerald Trump (born 1937), English cricketer
- Harvey Trump (born 1968), English cricketer
- Henry Searle né Trump (born 2006), English tennis player
- Judd Trump (born 1989), English snooker player

== Others ==
- Aussie Trump (born Benjamin Letts Dawkins, 1971), former Australian politician

== Fictional characters ==
- Warden Trump in Dragon Quest Monsters: Joker

== See also ==
- Anita Trumpe (born 1968), Latvian hurdler
- Drumpf (surname)
- Tromp (surname)
- Van Trump (surname)
