= Timeline of Mount Rainier expeditions =

From 1836 to 1899

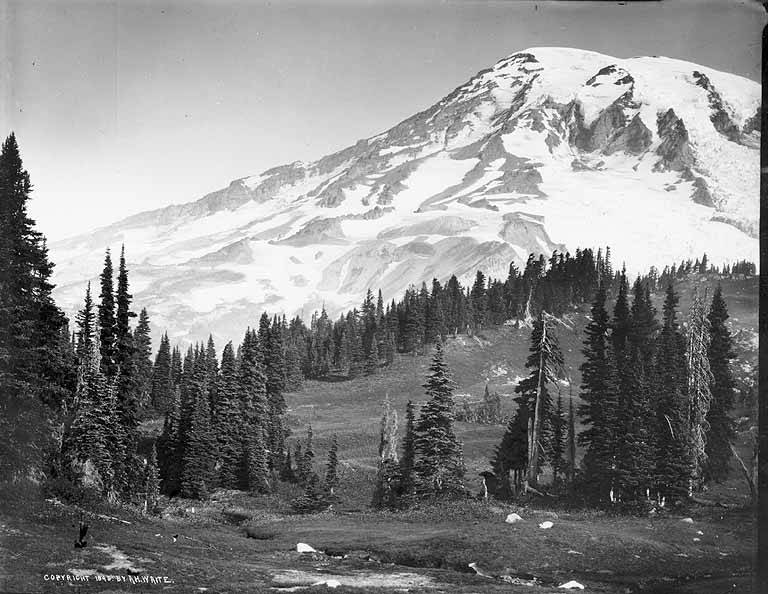
Mount Rainier's south peak, 19 August 1895.

Mount Rainier is a stratovolcano within the Cascade Range of the Pacific Northwest. The mountain is within modern-day Washington state, 59 miles south south-east of Seattle. Mt. Rainier is the tallest mountain in the Cascade Range, the fifth tallest in the contiguous 48, and the most prominent peak in the contiguous 48. The peak can be seen from approximately 150 mi (240 km) away. It is classified as an active volcano with the last eruptions occurring between 1894 and 1895. Mt. Rainier has a height of 14,410 ft (4,390 m) and a prominence of 13,246 ft (4,037 m).

== Timeline (1836 to 1870) ==
=== Early exploration ===
Andrew Jackson commissioned Lieutenant Charles Wilkes to lead the United States Exploring Expedition in 1836 with the goal of exploring the Pacific Ocean. Wilkes and the expedition reached Fort Nisqually on 11 May 1841, which would serve as their base for further exploration of the region. Although Wilkes expressed specific interest in the snowy peaks of Mount Rainier and Mount St. Helens, with a potential goal of ascending Mount Rainier, the undertaking was deemed as too much for the current expedition resources. Wilkes calculated the height of Mount Rainier using the triangulation method to a height of 12,330 feet, approximately 2000 feet less than the actual height of the mountain. The Wilkes expedition made the first successful navigation over the Naches Pass just north of Mount Rainier, which had been seen as a potential route for overland wagon travel.

In 1853, Theodore Winthrop visited the Northwest and wrote about his travel experience in the region in the book The Canoe and the Saddle, published in 1863. In his writings, Winthrop intentionally used the term Tacoma to refer to Mount Rainier, opting for the anglicized Lushootseed word for "snow-covered mountain." Winthrop's book described in detail Mount Rainier and the Native Americans of the region, inspiring future travelers.

=== Early settlement ===
The first permanent settlement on Puget Sound near Mount Rainier was that of Fort Nisqually. Fort Nisqually, also known as the Nisqually House, was created by Hudson's Bay Company in 1833 as a trading outpost for furs and agricultural supplies. This fort would become the launching point for early exploration of Mount Rainier and the surrounding region.

The first settler upon the slopes of Mount Rainier itself was James Longmire, an American who came to Washington Territory in 1853 with his family via the overland Naches Pass route. Longmire and his family settled in Yelm, Washington, in the valley below Mount Rainier. His home became a launching point for a number of exploratory trips to Mount Rainier. In the 1860s, Longmire was involved in surveys of the Nisqually River region at the base of Mount Rainier leading to his eventual employment as a guide for the 1870 ascent of Mount Rainier. Longmire would go on to locate a mineral claim at the base of Mount Rainier, leading to an increase of prospectors to the region and eventually an increase in tourists after, with the aid of some local American Indians, they cleared a road from the Succotash Valley to the springs and established Longmire hotel and health spa in 1884.

=== 1833: First approach and discovery of glaciers ===
The first non-indigenous man to approach Mt. Rainier was William Fraser Tolmie of the Hudson's Bay Company in August and September 1833. Tolmie, from Scotland, had arrived in the Pacific Northwest in the Spring of 1830 and helped with the construction of Fort Nisqually beginning in May 1833. Tolmie received permission to travel to the base of Mt. Rainier as part of a botanical excursion and was to be accompanied by five Native Americans including the Nisqually chief Lachalet, Lachalet's nephew Lashima, Nuckalkut and Quilniash of the Puyallup people, and one other unnamed Native American all of whom were to assist with navigation and in the finding of medicinal herbs. The group traveled up the Puyallup River to the base of the mountain. Once near the destination, Tolmie and one of the Native Americans on the trip climbed a nearby peak and were able to view Mt. Rainier from a closer distance than any Europeans had previously. From here, Tolmie witnessed the fact that there were glaciers present near the summit of Mt. Rainier. The hill from which Tolmie and the Native American man viewed these glaciers is now called Tolmie Peak.

=== 1857: First attempted ascent ===
By 1857, there had been no recorded ascent of Mt. Rainier, and the local American Indian population was supposedly superstitious about it. While stationed at Fort Steilacoom as part of the Indian Wars, Lieutenant August V. Kautz learned much about Mt. Rainier from the Nisqually chief Leschi, who was prisoner at the fort awaiting trial. While assisting in chief Leschi's defense, Kautz and Leschi became friends and Leschi shared valuable information about routes to the mountain while inspiring Kautz to attempt the summit. On 8 July 1857, Lieutenant August V. Kautz set out to ascend Mt. Rainier accompanied by four other soldiers and Fort Bellingham's doctor. The expedition stopped at the Nisqually Reservation to pick up their guide Wapowety, who supposedly knew more about the upper Nisqually River than any other man in his tribe. The plan was to approach Mt. Rainier's southern slope, which was seen as the most direct and best approach. The troop set up camp in the Mishawl Prairie before leaving their horses and making their approach to the mountain. The party then traveled from this base camp for another five days along the Nisqually River gorge until they reached the Nisqually Glacier on the southwest slope of Mt. Rainier. On 6 September 1857, the group began to travel the glacier, and the next day they reached a high point on the glacier. Due to lack of resources, the group turned back and did not reach the summit of the mountain. A glacier and creek were named after Lieutenant Kautz while the Wapowety Cleaver is named after the Native American guide. The peak would not be ascended for another thirteen years.

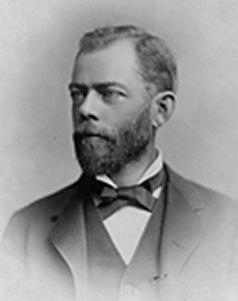
Hazard Stevens (following the American Civil War)

=== 1870: First successful ascent ===
Hazard Stevens and Philemon Beecher Van Trump were the first recorded to reach the summit of Mount Rainier. The two men met in 1867 while Van Trump was employed as the governor's secretary and Stevens was working for the Oregon Steam Navigation Company. They both expressed interest in attempting to summit Mt. Rainier, however, the men were not able to leave for two years because of forest fires in the region. In early August 1870, the men headed west to Yelm Prairie, there they would enlist the help of an experienced guide named James Longmire to lead them to Bear Prairie. While they were on the Yelm Prairie, Stevens and Van Trump met Edmund T. Coleman, an experienced mountain climber who agreed to accompany them.

When the group reached Bear Prairie, Longmire assisted the party in hiring a Native American guide to then guide the men to the base of the mountain. A Yakama man named Sluiskin knew the area well from hunting wild game and agreed to take them. Communication between Sluiskin and the climbing party took place in Chinook Jargon. Each of the three men agreed to pay him one dollar per day. Longmire then left them and returned home. Soon after, during their trek to the mountain, Coleman left the party due to complications with his gear. He took with him the groups altimeter and bacon.

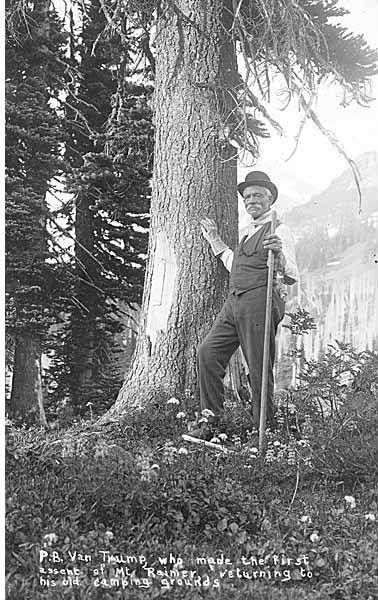
P. B. Van Trump revisiting old campground near Mount Rainier, 1909.

When Stevens, Van Trump, and Sluiskin reached the mountain, at about 6,500 foot elevation they set up a permanent campsite, called Stevens Camp. They named a nearby waterfall Sluiskin Falls after their guide.

However, Sluiskin refused to go past the snowline and further up the mountain. He attempted to warn the two men of the dangers of the mountains summit. Sluiskin explained that his grandfather, a great chief, had attempted to climb the mountain. He said that before reaching the summit, his grandfather had seen an evil spirit that lived beside a lake of fire. Sluiskin's grandfather fled, and no Native American went near the summit of the mountain. Sluiskin warned Stevens and Van Trump, referring to them as friends, that if the natural elements did not kill them, then the spirit would.

When he could not deter the men, Sluiskin told them that he would wait three days for their return. After which he would go to Olympia and tell the authorities there of their deaths. He demanded a written note from them clearing him of blame.

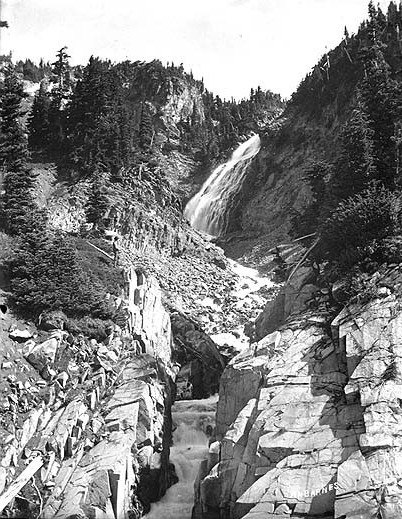
Sluiskin Falls: This waterfall was named by P.B. Van Trump and Hazard Stevens, after their Native American guide Sluiskin.

The day of the ascent Stevens and Van Trump, assuming their climb would not take more than a day, left their coats and blankets, and packed only enough food for one meal. They then left their camp and Sluiskin to climb the southwest slope of the mountain.

Above 10,000 feet the climb became treacherous, and the two men fought through dangerous snow and ice to what they assumed was the tallest point. There they planted a flag attached to Steven's walking staff, and named the place Peak Success. They then realized that the highest point was about 250 feet higher, and travelled to that point, which they named Crater Peak. They were forced to spend the night near the summit, huddling inside a cave containing a steam vent, unsure of their chances of survival.

They survived the night, and began to make their descent back to Stevens Camp. As they neared the end of their journey, Van Trump slipped, sliding 40 feet, severely gashed his thigh. When they found Sluiskin hunting near the camp, he at first would not approach them, unsure if they were real flesh and blood, or ghosts. The men returned to Olympia, and though many would not believe their story, they celebrated their victory.

== Other notable ascents (1870 to 1890) ==
=== 1870: S. F. Emmons ===
Upon the return of Stevens and Van Trump from their successful summit of Mt. Rainier, the scientists S.F. Emmons and A.D. Wilson set out to explore the mountain. Emmons and Wilson both were scientists working in the region as part of the United States Government Geological Exploration of the Fortieth Parallel. Emmons sent in his scientific report of the geological and topographical work the team was able to accomplish on Mt. Rainier to Clarence King. King published Emmons' findings and letter in the American Journal of Science in March 1871. This publication is the first scientific description of Mt. Rainier and its glacier. The publication refers to the mountain as "Tachoma".

=== 1888: John Muir ===
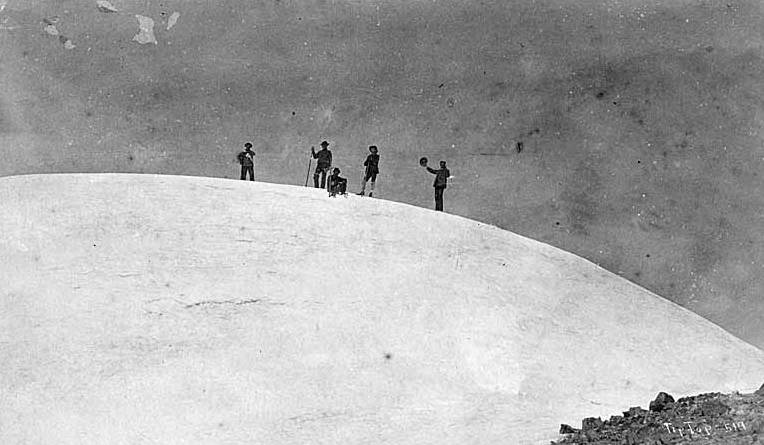
John Muir and climbing party on the summit of Mount Rainier, 1888. Left to right: D.W. Bass, P. B. Van Trump, John Muir, N.O. Booth, E. S. Ingraham

The Scottish-American naturalist John Muir, alongside Major E.S. Ingraham and six others summited Mt. Rainier in 1888. Muir and company found a pumice patch where they camped, this area is now known as Camp Muir. Muir's climbing group included the first photographer to climb and photograph the peak, Arthur C. Warner.

=== 1890: Fay Fuller ===
While teaching at a school in Yelm, Washington, Fay Fuller and her class were visited by P. B. Van Trump who inspired Fuller to summit Mt. Rainier herself. In 1890, after a failed attempt in 1887, Fuller was invited by P.B. Van Trump to join a climbing party and attempt to summit Rainier for a second time. On 10 August 1890, Fay Fuller became the first woman to summit Mt. Rainier.

== Mt. Rainier National Park (Post 1899) ==
On 2 March 1899, Mt. Rainier National Park was officially established, protecting the area federally and leading to many future ascents of Mt. Rainier. Mt. Rainier National Park is the fifth oldest national park in the United States.

== See also ==
- Denali
