= Van Trump (surname) =

Van Trump is a surname. Notable people with the surname include:

- Jessalyn Van Trump (1887–1939), American silent film actress
- Philadelph Van Trump (1810–1874), U.S. Representative from Ohio
- P. B. Van Trump (Philemon Beecher Van Trump; 1839–1916), American mountaineer
- Rebecca Newbold Van Trump (1839–1935), American painter
- R. V. Truitt (Reginald Van Trump Truitt; 1890–1991), American zoologist and lacrosse player

== See also ==
- Trump (surname)
- Van Trump (disambiguation)
