= Upper Comet Falls =

Waterfall in Washington (state), United States

Coordinates: 46°47′58″N 121°46′42″W

- Interactive map of Upper Comet Falls
- Location: Mount Rainier National Park, Pierce County, Washington, United States
- Type: Segmented
- Total height: 35 feet (11 m)
- Number of drops: 1
- Total width: 10 feet (3.0 m)
- Watercourse: Van Trump Creek

Upper Comet Falls is a waterfall in Pierce County, Washington. It is located along Van Trump Creek and is located a ways above Comet Falls. The falls may have been formed as a result of the floods of 2003 and 2006 that came down Van Trump Creek.

There used to be a bridge spanning the creek just below the falls, but it has been out since the debris flows in 2001 washed it away. The falls are easily seen from where the bridge used to be. Approaching the falls closely would not be terribly difficult, but one would have to climb over large boulders that were likely left there after the floods of 2003 and 2006.
