= Christine Falls Bridge =

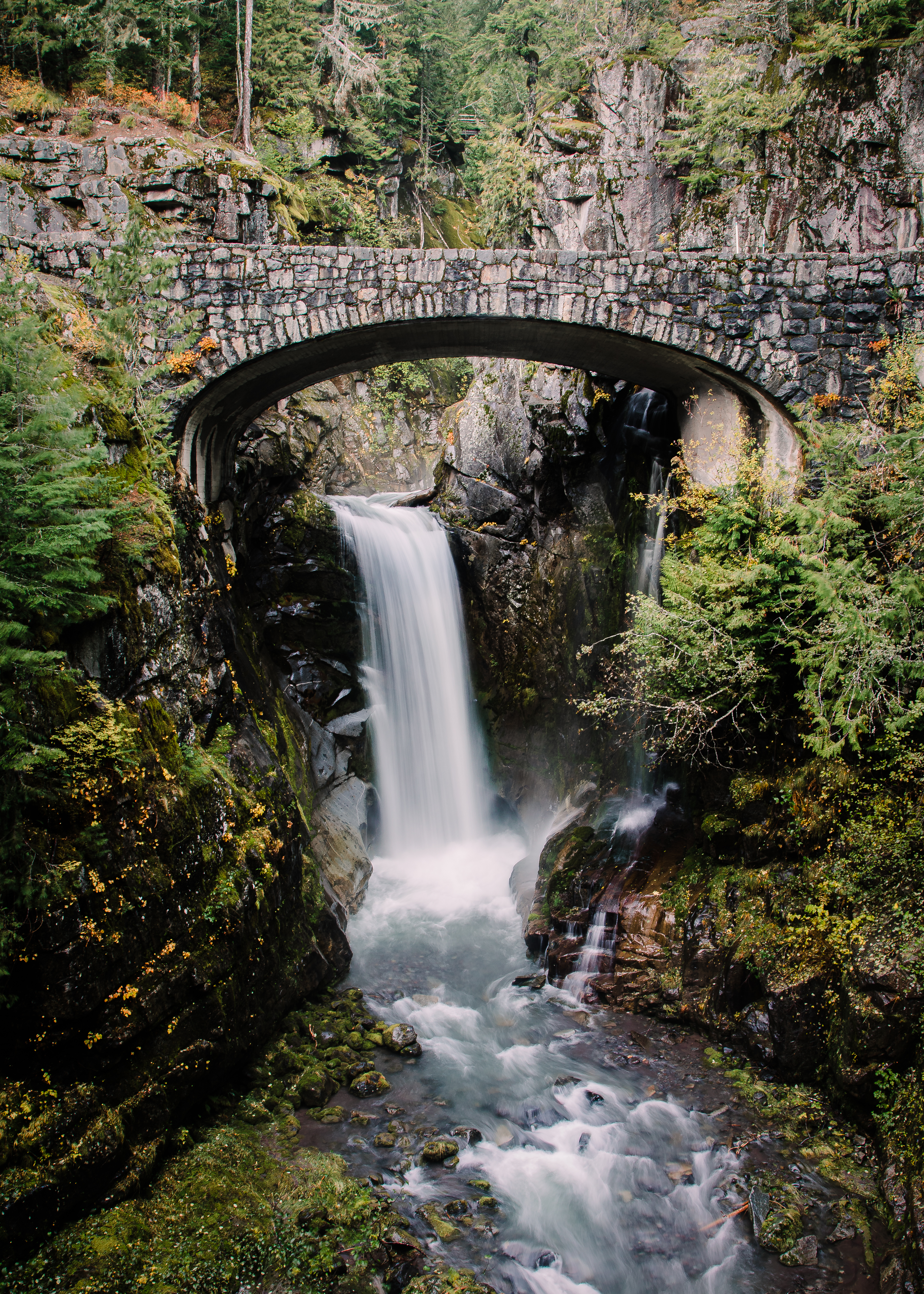
- Coordinates: 46°46′51″N 121°46′46″W
- Carries: Paradise Road
- Crosses: Van Trump Creek
- Locale: Paradise, Washington

Characteristics
- Design: Deck arch
- Total length: 56 feet (17 m)
- Width: 30 feet (9.1 m)

History
- Constructed by: J. D. Tobin
- Construction end: 1928
- Christine Falls Bridge
- U.S. National Register of Historic Places
- Area: Less than one acre
- Architectural style: Rustic style
- MPS: Mount Rainier National Park MPS
- NRHP reference No.: 91000196
- Added to NRHP: March 13, 1991

Location
- Interactive map of Christine Falls Bridge

The Christine Falls Bridge is a reinforced concrete arch bridge in Mount Rainier National Park, spanning Van Trump Creek at Christine Falls. The bridge was built in 1927–1928 by contractor J. D. Tobin of Portland, Oregon, who built the Narada Falls Bridge at the same time. The arch has a three-centered profile and spans 56 feet (17 m). The bridge is 30 feet (9.1 m) wide. It was faced with rubble stonework and is an example of National Park Service Rustic design.

The bridge was placed on the National Register of Historic Places on March 13, 1991. It is part of the Mount Rainier National Historic Landmark District, which encompasses the entire park and which recognizes the park's inventory of Park Service-designed rustic architecture.

== Predecessor bridges ==
Two other bridges formerly existed at this location. The "Old Christine Falls Bridge", built circa 1908 by the US Army Corps of Engineers, was constructed of wood in a Howe truss design. Its span was 100 feet (30 m) and was 100 feet (30 m) above the surface.

The first Christine Falls Bridge was condemned in 1917 because it was "badly decayed". A 60-foot-long (18 m) bridge was constructed closer to the falls as a replacement.

== See also ==
- List of bridges documented by the Historic American Engineering Record in Washington (state)
