= Stevens Peak =

Mountain in Washington, United States

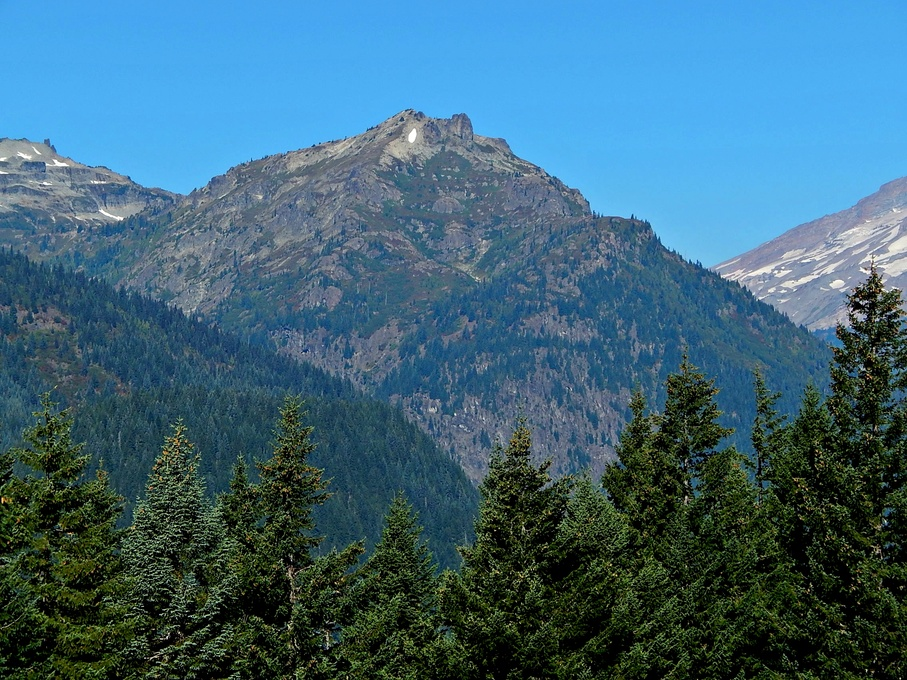
- East aspect from Stevens Canyon Road

Highest point
- Elevation: 6,560 ft (1,999 m)
- Prominence: 760 ft (232 m)
- Parent peak: Unicorn Peak
- Isolation: 1.16 mi (1.87 km)
- Coordinates: 46°44′46″N 121°40′37″W

Naming
- Etymology: Hazard Stevens

Geography
- Location within Washington (state) Location within the United States
- Country: United States
- State: Washington
- County: Lewis
- Protected area: Mount Rainier National Park
- Parent range: Cascades
- Topo map: USGS Tatoosh Lakes

Climbing
- Easiest route: Scrambling

Stevens Peak is a 6,560-foot (1,999-metre) mountain summit in Lewis County, Washington, United States.

== Description ==
Stevens Peak is located in Mount Rainier National Park, one mile east of Unicorn Peak in the Tatoosh Range which is a sub-range of the Cascade Range. Precipitation runoff from the mountain drains into tributaries of the Cowlitz River. Topographic relief is significant as the summit rises 3,800 feet (1,158 meters) above Stevens Canyon in 1.25 mile (2 km). The name honors Hazard Stevens who made the first documented ascent of Mount Rainier along with P. B. Van Trump on August 17, 1870. The mountain's toponym was officially adopted in 1913 by the United States Board on Geographic Names.

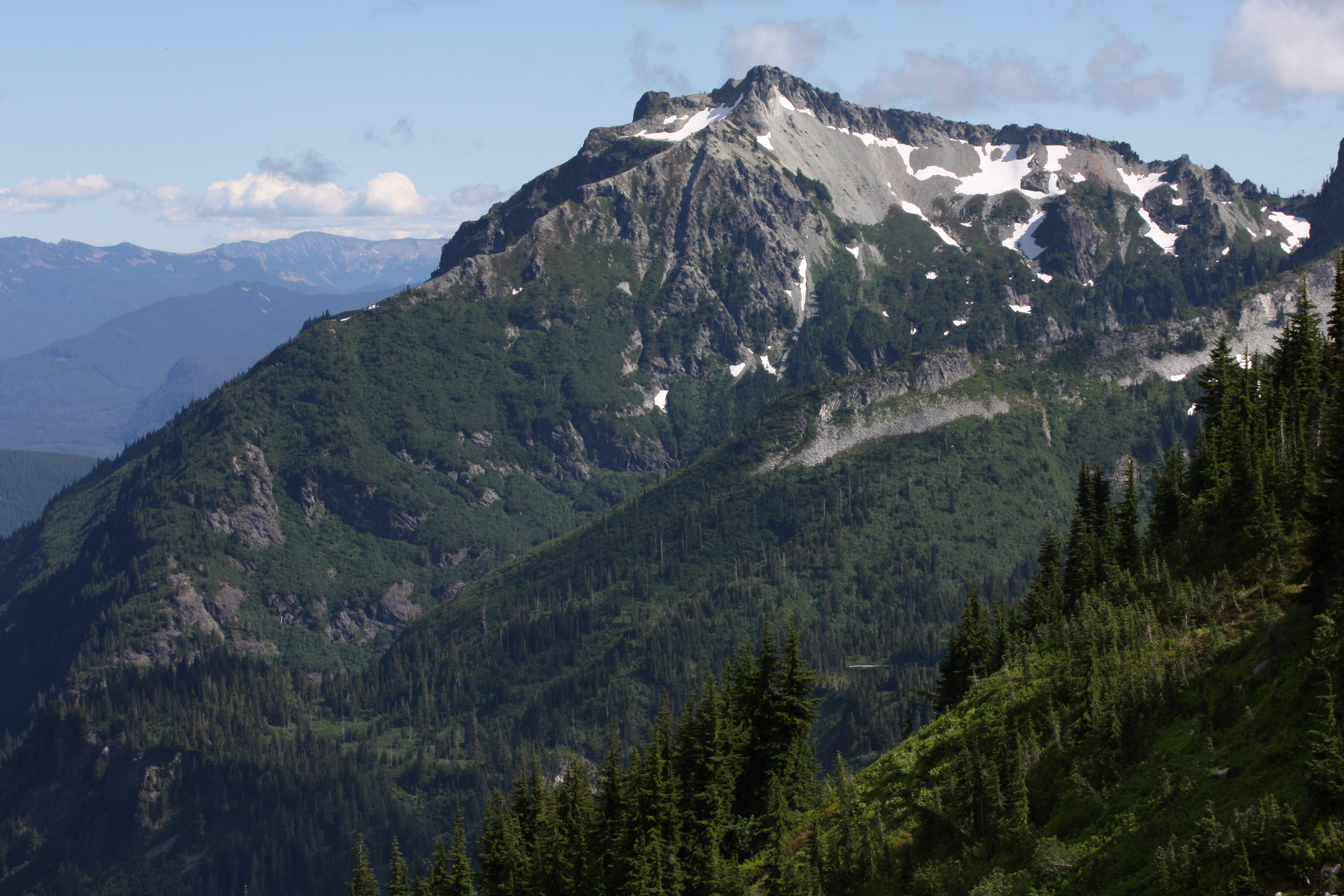
Stevens Peak from northwest

== Climate ==
Stevens Peak is located in the marine west coast climate zone of western North America. Weather fronts originating in the Pacific Ocean travel northeast toward the Cascade Mountains. As fronts approach, they are forced upward by the peaks of the Cascade Range (orographic lift), causing them to drop their moisture in the form of rain or snowfall onto the Cascades. As a result, the west side of the North Cascades experiences high precipitation, especially during the winter months in the form of snowfall. Because of maritime influence, snow tends to be wet and heavy, resulting in high avalanche danger. Due to its temperate climate and proximity to the Pacific Ocean, areas west of the Cascade Crest very rarely experience temperatures below 0 °F (−18 °C) or above 80 °F (27 °C). During winter months, weather is usually cloudy, but due to high pressure systems over the Pacific Ocean that intensify during summer months, there is often little or no cloud cover during the summer.

== See also ==
- List of geographic features in Lewis County, Washington
