= Trumper =

Trumper is a surname. Notable people with the surname include:

== Notable people ==
- Gillian Trumper (1936–2019), Canadian politician
- Lutz Trümper (born 1955), German politician
- Simon Trumper (born 1963), English poker player
- Victor Trumper (1877–1915), Australian cricketer

== Fictional People ==
- Anthony Trumper, the main antagonist from Shaun the Sheep Movie
- Freddie Trumper, an American grandmaster in Chess
- Charles Trumper, the main character in As the Crow Flies

== See also ==
- Geo. F. Trumper, barbershop
- Trumper Park Oval
- Trumpers Crossing Halte railway station
- Trump (surname)
