= Christine Falls =

Waterfall in Washington (state), United States

Coordinates: 46°46′51″N 121°46′47″W

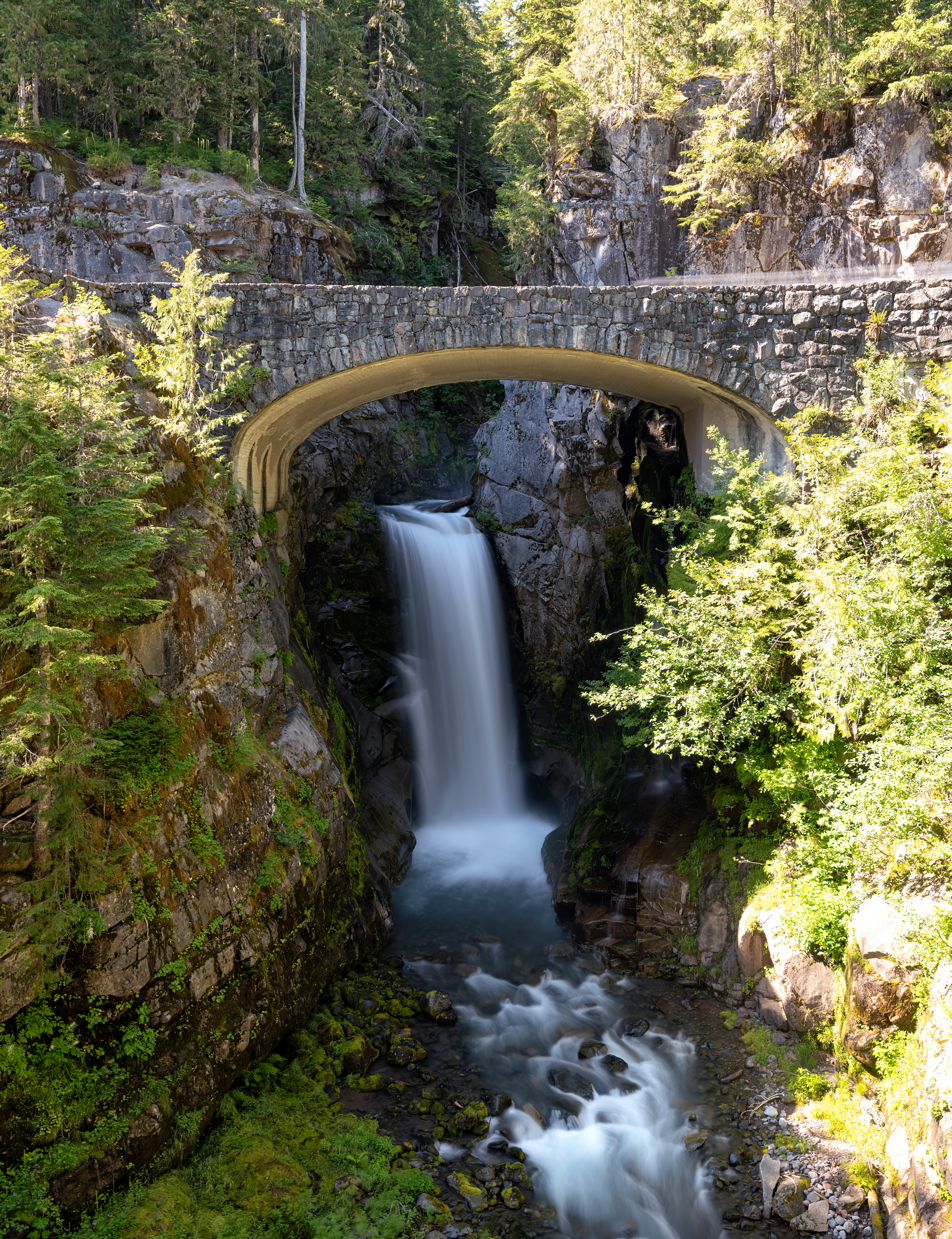
- Christine Falls from downstream.
- Interactive map of Christine Falls
- Location: Mount Rainier National Park, Pierce County, Washington, United States
- Type: Tiered
- Total height: 69 feet (21 m)
- Total width: 10 feet (3.0 m)
- Watercourse: Van Trump Creek

Christine Falls is a waterfall on Van Trump Creek in Pierce County, Washington. The falls are 69 feet (21 m) feet high and are best known for the Christine Falls Bridge spanning the lower drop. The upper drop is 32 feet (9.8 m) high and is almost impossible to film in tandem with the oft-photographed 37-foot (11 m) lower tier. The lower tier is probably one of the most commonly photographed locations in the Mount Rainier area.

The falls were named in honor of Christine Van Trump, the daughter of P. B. Van Trump. In 1889 Christine, then nine years old, accompanied her father on an ascent of Mount Rainier, as far as her strength would allow. She made it to the 10,000-foot (3,000 m) level, even though she had a crippling nervous disorder.

== Debris flows of 2001 ==
The debris flows of 2001 scoured the creek's banks clean of plant life, and altered the falls. It took a large chunk of rock and dumped it into the upper tier of the falls, altering it a bit.
