= Donald Trump (disambiguation) =

Donald Trump (born 1946) is the current president of the United States.

Donald Trump may also refer to:

== People ==
- Donald Trump Jr. (born 1977), American businessman, son of the president
- Donald L. Trump (born 1945), American oncologist

== Songs ==
- "Donald Trump" (song), a 2011 single by rapper Mac Miller
- "Donald Trump", a 2018 single by Lil Nas X
- "Donald Trump (Black Version)", a song by The Time from the 1990 album Pandemonium

== Television ==
- "Donald Trump" (Last Week Tonight with John Oliver), a 2016 segment on the news satire program
- Saturday Night Live parodies of Donald Trump

== Other ==
- Donald Trump (buffalo), an albino water buffalo from Bangladesh

== See also ==
- List of things named after Donald Trump
- Donald Crump (1933–2011), commissioner of the Canadian Football League
- "FDT (Fuck Donald Trump)", a 2016 single by rapper YG featuring Nipsey Hussle
- Jeff Trachta (born 1960), actor and singer who appeared as "The Singing Trump" on America's Got Talent (season 12)
- Presidency of Donald Trump (disambiguation)
- Trump (disambiguation)
