= Franklin Rhoda =

Franklin Rhoda (July 14, 1854 - Sept. 10, 1929). In the words of historian Mike Foster, Frank Rhoda was an "artist, musician, writer, surveyor, naturalist, social critic, defender of civil liberties and champion of Christ - the only theme unifying his versatile life was idealism that aimed to reform almost everything he encountered."

Born in Crescent City, California, he grew up on a large fruit farm in the Fruitvale section of Oakland. Rhoda studied civil engineering at the University of California and in 1872 at age 19 he was the youngest member of that institution's first graduating class. The University tried to recruit him to teach mathematics. In addition he informally studied ancient Greek and Hebrew during his college days.

For three summer seasons (1873–75) he worked with his half brother A. D. Wilson as assistant topographer producing eloquent notes and detailed sketches of mountains in southwestern Colorado. Rhoda's chronicling of the 1874 Hayden Survey has been considered one of the "best of the last century in American mountaineering", and parts of his account were published in the Pittsburgh Gazette. Through the efforts of Mike Foster, his 1874 survey notes were published in a 1984 book, "Summits to Reach." As part of the surveys, he scaled six mountains over 14,000 feet including Uncompahgre Peak, Mt. Wilson (named for A.D. Wilson), Mt. Sneffels, Handies Peak, San Luis Peak, and Sunshine Peak. In all, Wilson and Rhoda “climbed 35 summits over 12,000 feet in order to triangulate for mapping the great San Juan uplift. Mount Rhoda a 13,402 foot peak in San Juan County, CO is named for him.Mount Rhoda : Climbing, Hiking & Mountaineering : SummitPost A photography of Rhoda and A.D. Wilson on top of Sultan Mountain appears on the cover of “Great Surveys of the American West” by Richard A. Bartlett.

While Rhoda was assisting his father, Frederick Rhoda in operating the fruit farm during the 1870s, he was also active in many social and political causes. He wrote numerous articles "attacking financiers, especially stockbrokers and real estate agents...he fired equal wrath at apparently socialistic Irishmen who were organizing the labor force in California. He was particularly upset about the persecution of the Chinese and wrote detailed letters to local and national newspapers defending them. Newspapers also published his writings on nature, philosophical and political topics.

Frank Rhoda was always religious and in 1880 he co-founded a Presbyterian Sunday School in Fruitvale which evolved into a full church in 1890. In 1882 he published a small book, "Bible Gems," a collection of verses from the Old and New Testaments which he grouped into 39 key themes.

In 1883 Rhoda enrolled at the San Francisco Theological Seminary, but soon dropped out to follow his own religious path which involved co-editing two religious monthlies, practicing and teaching "mind cure" an offshoot Christian Science, the "holiness movement," street preaching/singing, co-founding a "Church of the New Age" and founding an "Underground Mission". This religious odyssey led Frank back toward traditional Protestantism and in the fall of 1887 he rejoined the Theological Seminary. He completed the program this time, but took off from May to August 1888 to travel to Japan and China as an unofficial missionary. His trip journal indicates he visited several Christian missions and schools in each country and tried to convert people to Christianity throughout the trip. During the trip his mind and daily thoughts were primarily focused on God and religion. Unfortunately, upon returning to San Francisco nobody could disembark as the ship was placed in quarantine because two passengers had smallpox. In 1889, he was officially ordained as a Presbyterian minister and served as pastor for the Memorial Presbyterian Church in South San Francisco for three years.

In 1890 he married Clare Rebecca “Bessie” Williams 15 years his junior and daughter of his landlady, who had helped him establish the “Church of the New Age.” The couple spent most of their married life in Fruitvale near his boyhood home and had ten children: John Williams Rhoda, Ellen Rhoda, Frank L. Rhoda, Paul Ernest Rhoda, Lyte Wilbur Rhoda, Mabel Rhoda, Floyd Lincoln Rhoda, Lawrence Rhoda, Grace Rhoda, and A. Lucille Rhoda. Franklin did not manage financial matters well and felt that money was the root of all evil. He renounced several mortgages bequeathed to him and sold off portions of the land he inherited to support his ten children. Fortunately, his half-brother A.D. Wilson provided him with a stipend during the latter days of his life.

Frank Rhoda served as pastor in the Bay Area for about 25 years, including 17 years at the Presbyterian Church in Fruitvale, which he had organized as a Sunday school in 1880. He injected evangelical enthusiasm into his pastorships by “preaching twice on Sundays, leading prayer meetings before regular services, and also on Wednesday evenings, instituting evening song services scores of times during each year, and by inviting other evangelists to preach." He reached out to numerous ethnic groups including Blacks, Chinese, Mexicans and Native Americans.

Rhoda was an active prohibitionist. In 1901, he was instrumental in getting the Alameda county supervisors to close five drinking establishments in the community. Franklin Rhoda was the 1903 Prohibition Party candidate for Supervisor of the Alameda's 2nd district and in 1913 he was a speaker at the Women's Christian Temperance Union of Alameda County. He also actively opposed smoking, gambling and prostitution.

Rhoda retired 1918 and lived out his life in his house on Lincoln Avenue (named for his son Lincoln Rhoda) in Fruitvale. He remained active in retirement continuing his religious convictions and interest in nature, local history and civic affairs. Rhoda's philosophy and knowledge were based on personal insights and direct experience, he was “suspicious of professors, book learning, and the specialization of experts” and he "laughed at evolution, but just as ruthlessly made fun of creationists."

== Bibliography ==
- Summits to Reach: An Annotated Edition of Franklin Rhoda's Report on the Topography of the San Juan Country, Rhoda, Franklin.
