= Hazard Stevens =

United States Army Medal of Honor recipient (1842–1918)

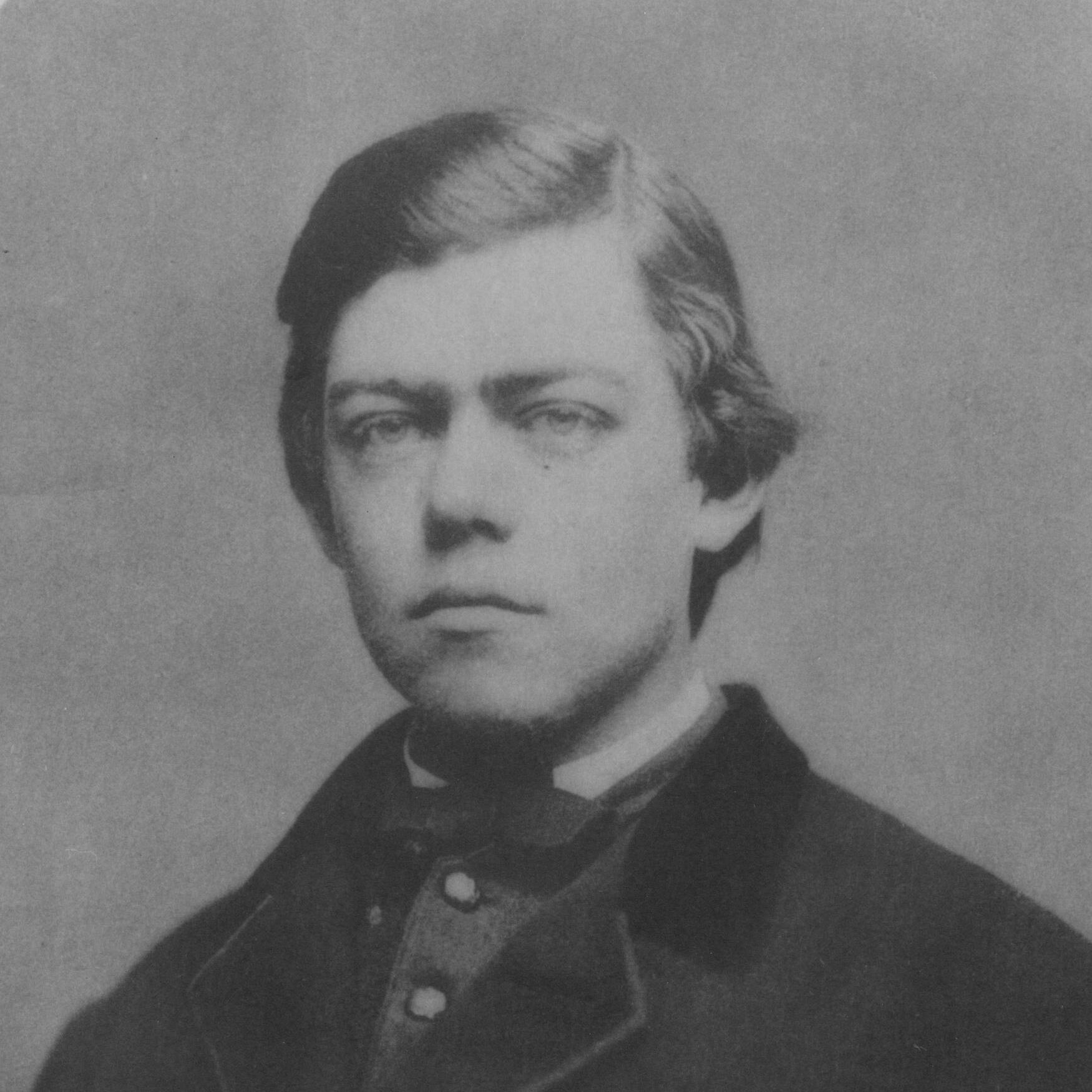
- Hazard Stevens circa 1865
- Born: June 9, 1842; Newport, Rhode Island, US
- Died: October 11, 1918 (aged 76); Goldendale, Washington, US
- Burial place: Island Cemetery, Newport, Rhode Island
- Military career
- Allegiance: United States of America; Union
- Branch: United States Army; Union Army
- Service years: 1861–1865
- Rank: Major; Brevet Brigadier General
- Unit: 79th New York Volunteer Infantry
- Conflicts: American Civil War: Battle of Chantilly; Battle of Fort Huger
- Awards: Medal of Honor
- Other work: Federal revenue collector, attorney, politician

Hazard Stevens (June 9, 1842 – October 11, 1918) was an American military officer, mountaineer, politician and writer. He received the Medal of Honor for his service in the Union army during the American Civil War at the Battle of Fort Huger. Stevens and Philemon Beecher Van Trump made the first documented successful climb of Mount Rainier on August 17, 1870.

== Early life and the Civil War ==
Stevens was born in Newport, Rhode Island on June 9, 1842, the son of Isaac I. Stevens and Margaret Hazard Stevens. In 1854, his father became the first governor of the new Washington Territory and the Stevens family moved to Olympia, Washington. Both father and son volunteered in the Union army during the Civil War and served in the 79th New York Volunteer Infantry.

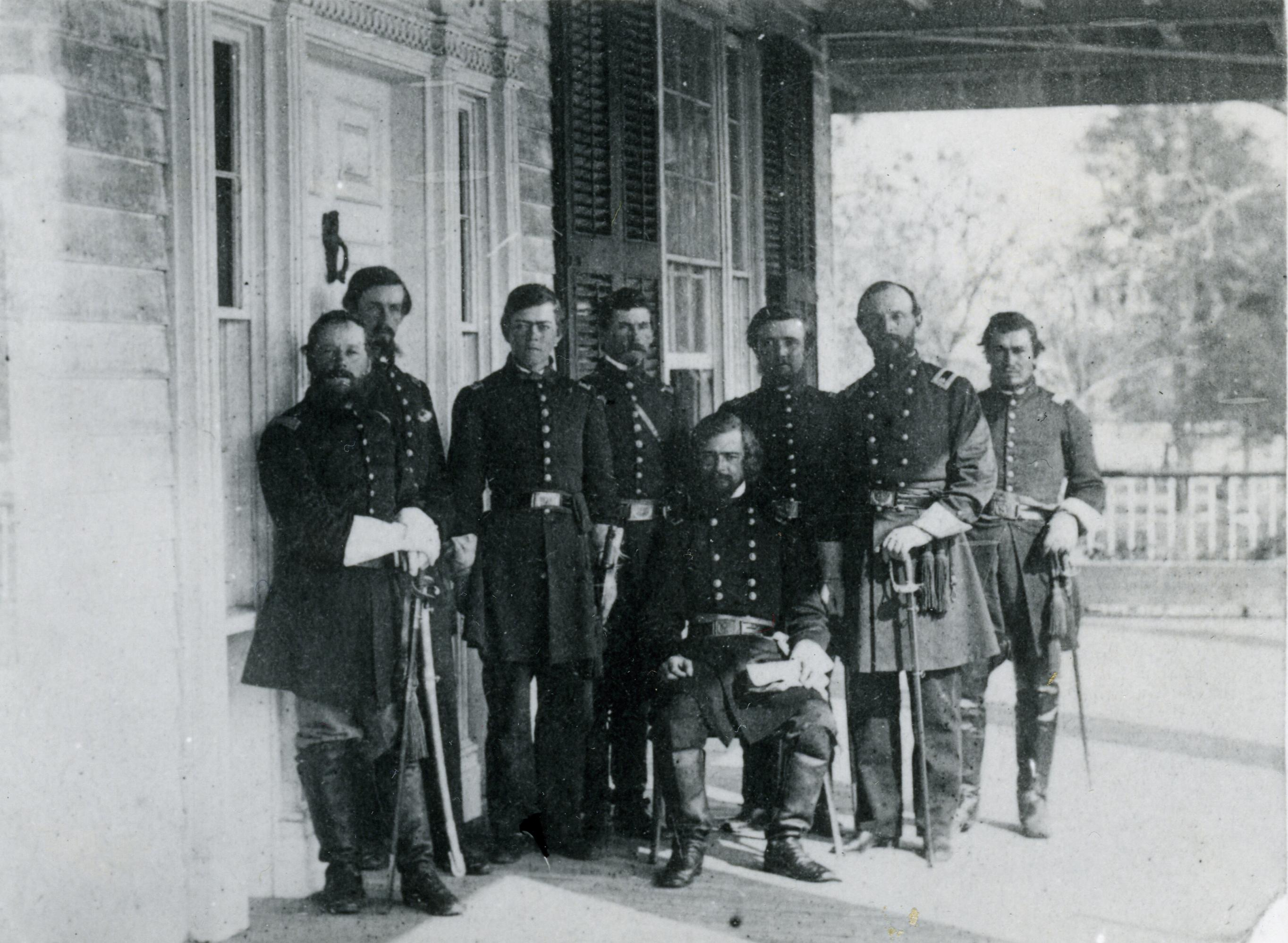
Isaac Stevens and his division staff, circa 1861-1862. Hazard Stevens (his son) stands third from the left.

Hazard Stevens was a major and assistant adjutant general. Hazard was wounded and his father, by then a general, was killed in the Battle of Chantilly on September 1, 1862. For his contribution to the capture of Fort Huger, Virginia, on April 19, 1863, Stevens received the Medal of Honor on June 13, 1894. Stevens was mustered out of the Union Army volunteers on September 19, 1865. On January 13, 1866, President Andrew Johnson nominated Stevens for appointment to the brevet grade of brigadier general of volunteers, to rank from April 2, 1865, and the U.S. Senate confirmed the nomination on March 12, 1866.

== After the war and the ascent of Mount Rainier ==
After the war, Stevens returned to Washington to care for his widowed mother, initially working for the Oregon Steam Navigation Company and then as a federal revenue collector in 1868. He then met P. B. Van Trump, who was working as the private secretary to Marshall F. Moore, the seventh governor of the territory. Both men were interested in climbing Mount Rainier and on August 17, 1870 they completed the first documented ascent of the mountain.

The Stevens Van Trump Historic Monument along the Skyline Trail in Mount Rainier National Park was erected to commemorate the historic first ascent of the mountain. Nearby Stevens Peak, Stevens Canyon, and Stevens Ridge are named after him.

Stevens joined the bar in 1871, representing the Northern Pacific Railroad Company in their prosecution of lumber theft cases. In 1874, Stevens investigated British claims on the San Juan Islands at the request of President Ulysses S. Grant.

== Later life ==
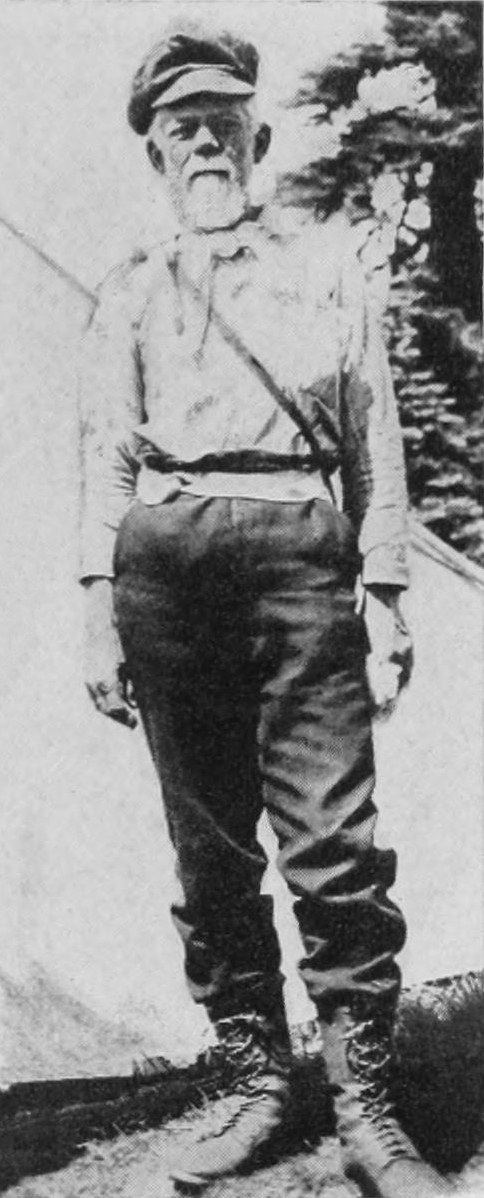
Hazard Stevens during his second ascent of Mount Rainier in 1905.

In 1874, Stevens moved to Dorchester, Massachusetts near Boston. He then entered the Massachusetts state legislature as a reformer in 1885. He successfully lobbied for the preservation of Boston's Old State House. He was unsuccessful in a run for the United States Congress.

In 1887 Stevens was admitted to the Rhode Island Society of the Cincinnati by right of his descent from Lieutenant Colonel Daniel Lyman.

Stevens climbed Mount Rainier a second time in 1905 on a trip organized by The Mazamas, an Oregon mountaineering club.

Stevens returned to Washington in 1914. He established the Cloverfields Dairy Farm in Olympia, Washington in 1916. Now on the National Historic Register, the former farm is the site of the present Olympia High School.

Later in life, Stevens wrote The Life of Isaac Ingalls Stevens, a noted biography of his father in addition to many papers on the Civil War. In 1918, while in frail health, he presided over the ceremonial placement of a memorial marker to Bureau of Indian Affairs agent Andrew Bolon in Klickitat County, Washington and, the following day, suffered a stroke of paralysis. He died unmarried shortly thereafter and is interred at Island Cemetery in Newport, Rhode Island.

== Medal of Honor citation ==

Rank and Organization:

Captain and Assistant Adjutant General, U.S. Volunteers. Place and Date: At Fort Huger, Va., April 19, 1863. Entered service at: Olympia, Washington Territory. Born: June 9, 1842, Newport, R.I. Date of issue: June 13, 1894.

Citation: Gallantly led a party that assaulted and captured the fort.

== See also ==
- List of Medal of Honor recipients
- List of American Civil War Medal of Honor recipients: Q–S
- History of Olympia
