= Van Trump Falls =

Waterfall in Washington (state), United States

Coordinates: 46°47′32″N 121°46′54″W

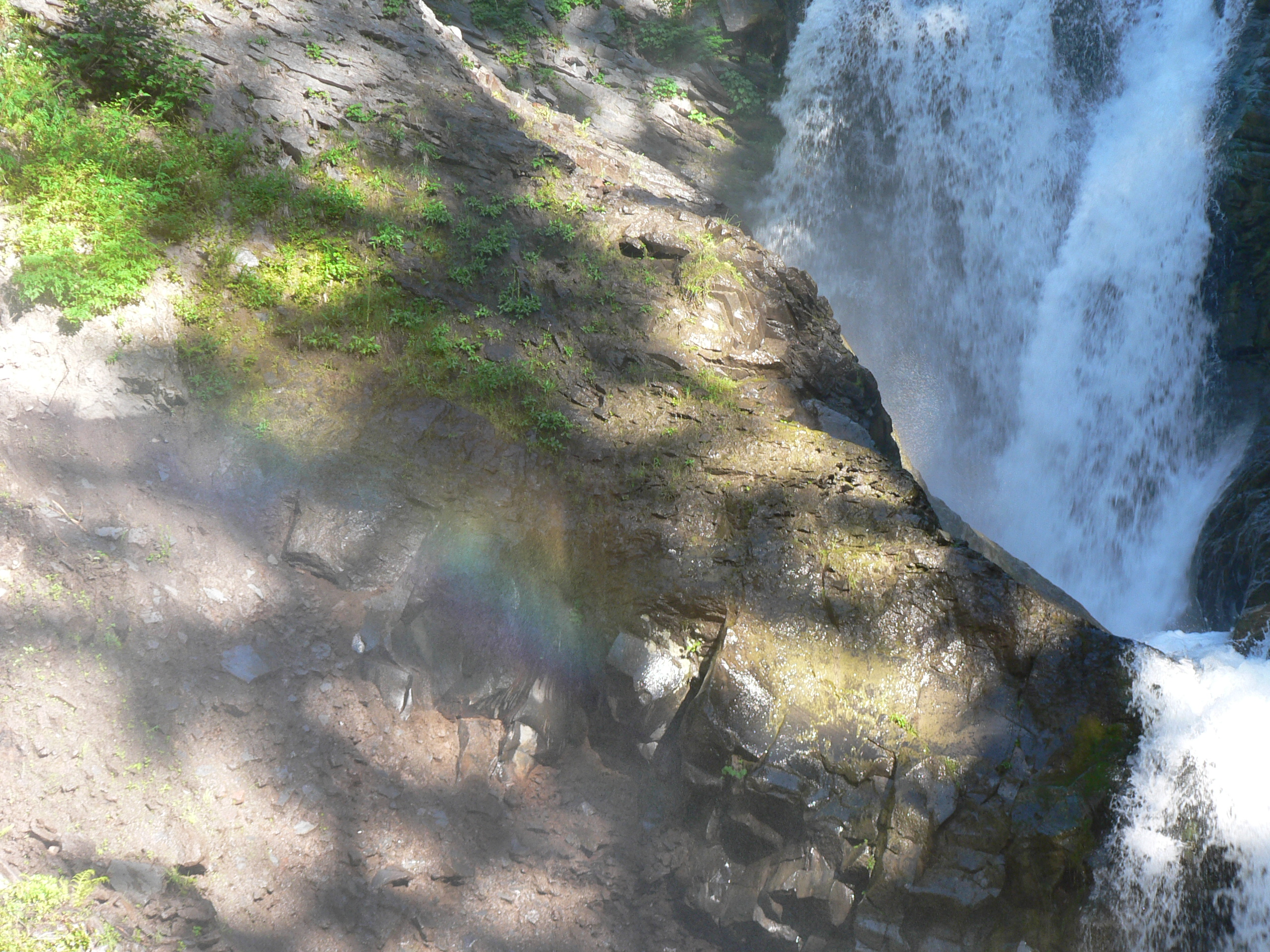
- Interactive map of Van Trump Falls
- Location: Mount Rainier National Park, Pierce County, Washington, United States
- Type: Tiered
- Total height: 170 feet (52 m)
- Number of drops: 4
- Total width: 15 feet (4.6 m)
- Watercourse: Van Trump Creek

Van Trump Falls is a waterfall on Van Trump Creek in Pierce County, Washington. The falls are located a short distance downstream from the mouth of Falls Creek.

== Stature ==
The falls start off by dropping 40 feet in a simple plunge before fanning out and falling 80 feet into a short but deep canyon. After flowing through the canyon the falls drop another 50 feet in two horsetails. The lower tiers were significantly altered by the floods of 2001 while neither tier was altered much by the floods of 2003 and 2006.

Accessing the upper tiers can be sketchy since one has to stand at the edge of the canyon, 150 feet above the raging creek, to see them. Reaching the base of the falls is almost as bad, as one has to climb down a slick and slippery rock face to reach it.
