= A. D. Wilson =

American cartographer

Allen David "A.D." Wilson (September 17, 1844 – February 21, 1920) was an American cartographer.

== Biography ==
He was born in Sparta, Illinois. He left school and in March 1867, enlisted with the Geological Survey of California. There he learned triangulation. In July 1868, he joined Clarence King for his Geological Exploration of the Fortieth Parallel and stayed with him through 1872. During that time, Wilson accompanied King and others to investigate and eventually debunk a diamond hoax in the northwest corner of the Colorado Territory. Wilson then joined Ferdinand Vandeveer Hayden, and between 1873 and 1878 he led a survey party across western Colorado, western Wyoming, and eastern Idaho. Wilson's half-brother Franklin Rhoda was a key member of this survey team. In 1879, Hayden's Survey was merged with others to form the U.S. Geological Survey. Clarence King named Wilson the chief topographer of the USGS.

Wilson resigned from the USGS on September 30, 1881, in order to become chief topographer for the Northern Transcontinental Survey, organized by Raphael Pumpelly. Henry Villard, president of the Northern Pacific Railroad, had invited Pumpelly to map a route through the territories of Washington, Idaho, and Montana and to identify the economic resources near the railroad lines. Pumpelly published part of that survey in his report for the Tenth Census, including at least one of Wilson's maps.

During the 1890s, Wilson relocated to Oakland, California, where he and other civic leaders organized the Athenian Bank (later renamed the Security Bank and Trust of Oakland). In 1918, the bank was absorbed by the Bank of Italy and soon thereafter became the Bank of America. He died of influenza on February 21, 1920, in Oakland.

== Awards and honors ==
- Mount Wilson (Colorado) was named for A. D. Wilson, a topographer with the Hayden Survey. He was in the first ascent party, which climbed the peak on September 13, 1874, via the south ridge (a difficult route, not often climbed today).
- Wilson Peak - Elevation 14,017 feet - This peak high in the San Juan mountains above the old mining structures in the Silver Pick Basin was named for A. D. Wilson, a chief cartographer with the Hayden Survey.
- Wilson Glacier (Mount Rainier) - a medium-sized tributary glacier located on the southeast flank of Mount Rainier in Washington state.

== Publications ==
- "Report on the Primary Triangulation of Colorado" in Hayden's Tenth Annual Report, (1878), pages 275–309.
- Geological and Geographical Atlas of Colorado and Portions of Adjacent Territory, 1877
- Leadville special map (Lake County) Colorado. U.S. Geological Survey (1910)
- Colorado, Tenmile District. U.S. Geological Survey (1897)(reprinted 1945)
