= Van Trump Glacier =

Glacier in the United States

- Interactive map of Van Trump Glacier
- Type: Mountain glacier
- Location: Mount Rainier, Pierce County, Washington, USA
- Coordinates: 46°49′05″N 121°45′41″W
- Area: 0.2 square miles (0.5 km^{2}), 1983

The Van Trump Glacier is a scattering of glaciers and snowfields located on the southern flank of Mount Rainier in Washington. Named after P. B. Van Trump, who was part of an early ascent of Mount Rainier, the glacier covers 0.2 square miles (0.5 km^{2}) and contains 500 million ft^{3} (14 million m^{3}) of ice. The glacier is located between the Wilson Glacier to the east and the Kautz Glacier to the west. The elevation of the scattering ranges from 7,000 feet (2,100 m) at the lower end to 9,800 ft (3,000 m) on the upper reaches of the glacier. Meltwater from the glacier drains into the Nisqually River.

In a June 2023 report from the National Park Service, the glacier had lost 43% of its volume between 2015 and 2021. Based on 2022 satellite imagery, glaciologist Mauri Pelto declared Pyramid Glacier dead.

== See also ==
- List of glaciers
