= Van Trump Creek =

Coordinates: 46°46′26″N 121°46′51″W

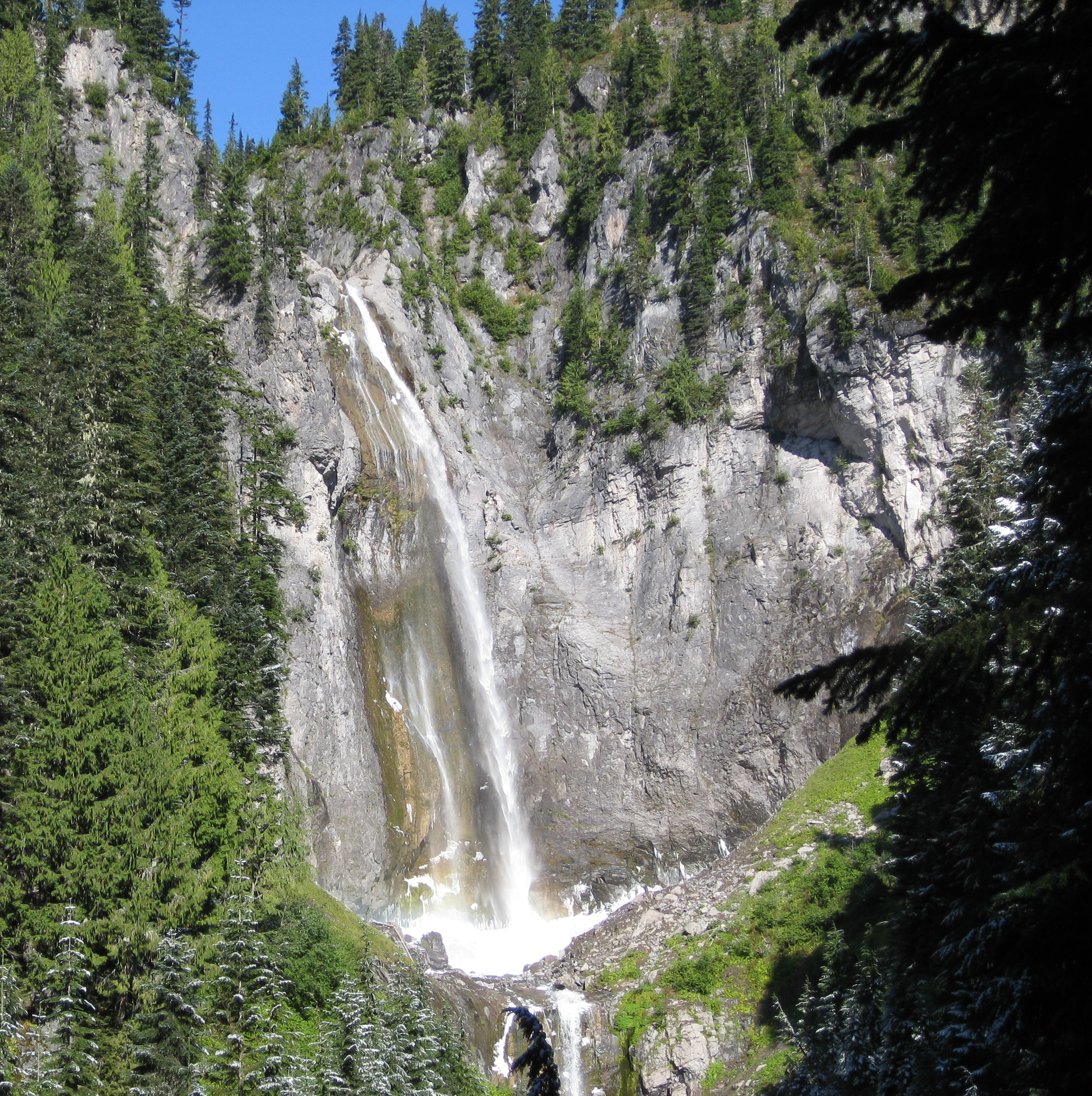
- Etymology: P. B. Van Trump

Location
- Country: United States
- State: Washington
- County: Pierce County

Physical characteristics
- Source: Van Trump Glacier
  - location: Mount Rainier
- Mouth: Nisqually River

Van Trump Creek, also called Van Trump Falls Creek or the Van Trump Fork of the Nisqually River, is a creek in Pierce County, Washington. It is a tributary of the Nisqually River, joining the river just above the mouth of the Paradise River. The creek is known for having several well known waterfalls along its course.

== Course ==
The creek originates at the toe of the Van Trump Glacier and flows south. Just west of Mildred Point, the creek drops over small Upper Comet Falls. Shortly below that, the creek drops over the largest and best known of the falls on the creek, Comet Falls. Shortly below Comet Falls, Falls Creek joins Van Trump Creek. The creek drops over another major waterfall just below the mouth of Falls Creek, Van Trump Falls. After dropping over the falls, the creek enters a deep canyon, which extends almost all the way to its mouth. About halfway through the gorge, the creek drops over Lower Van Trump Falls before exiting the canyon by dropping over Christine Falls and under Longmire-to-Paradise Road. The creek then continues south to where it meets the Nisqually.

== Debris Flows of 2001 ==
On August 14, 2001, a ton of debris washed down from the Kautz Glacier and flowed down the creek, turning the creek into a raging torrent of mud and other debris. Most of the waterfalls on the creek were not seriously altered, but the mudflows scoured out existing vegetation and took out the bridge above Comet Falls, which was not replaced.

== Floods of 2003 and 2006 ==
In 2003 and 2006, Van Trump Creek and Falls Creek experienced major floods. The floods brought huge amounts of water down, large enough to take out all the dead vegetation, left by the 2001 mudflows, lining the creek in many places and replace them with gigantic boulders in some areas, especially below Upper Comet Falls. It altered several of the falls on the creek.

== See also ==
- List of rivers in Washington
