= Comet Falls =

Waterfall in Washington (state), United States

Coordinates: 46°47′45″N 121°46′48″W

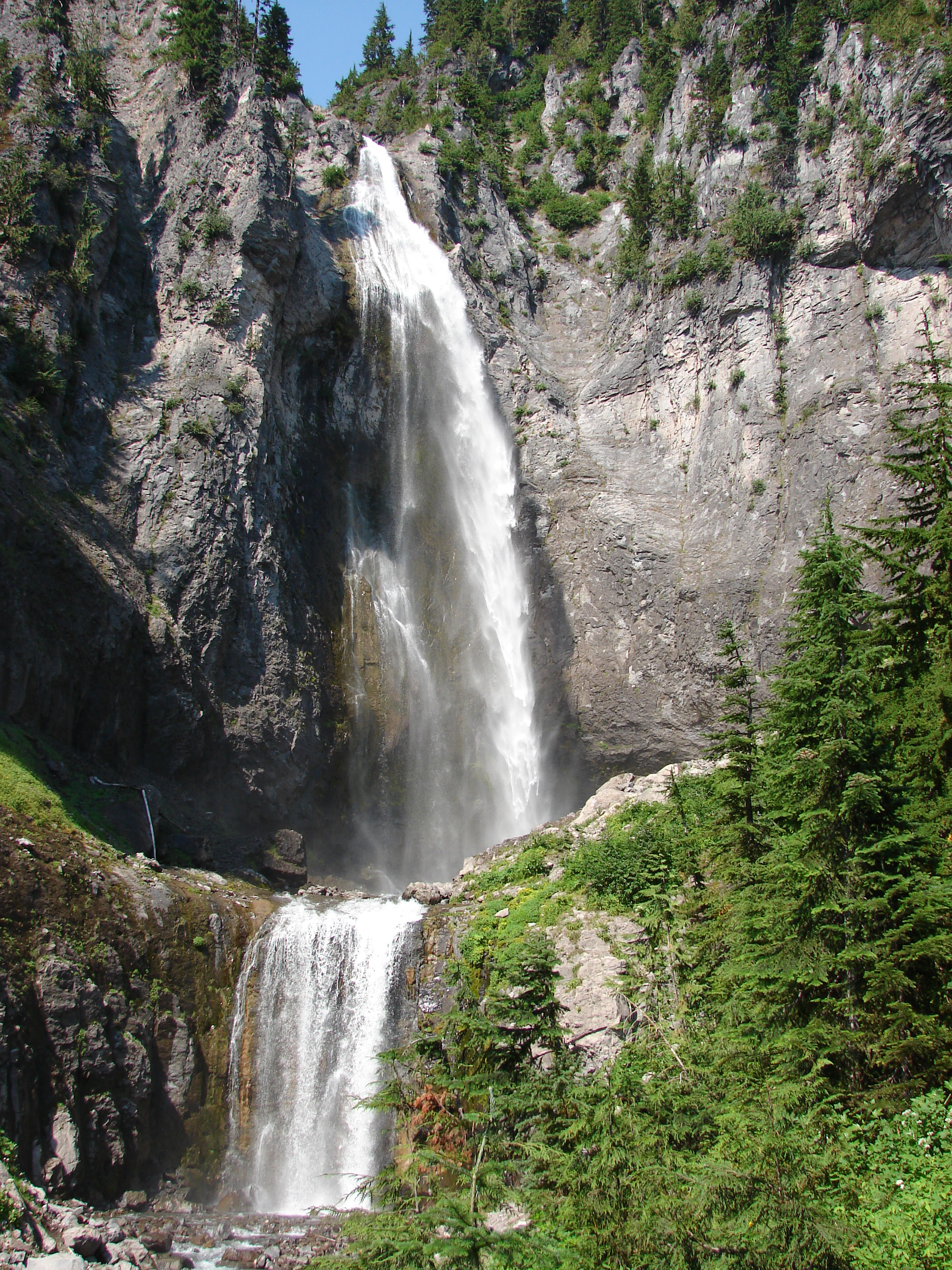
- Interactive map of Comet Falls
- Location: Mount Rainier National Park, Pierce County, Washington, United States
- Type: Tiered
- Total height: 380 feet (120 m)
- Number of drops: 4
- Total width: 30 feet (9.1 m)
- Watercourse: Van Trump Creek

Comet Falls is a tall waterfall located on Van Trump Creek in Pierce County, Washington. The falls are thought to be the best in the Mount Rainier region.

== Stature ==
At first glance the falls drop about 300 feet (91 m) out of a hanging valley in one lofty plunge. The height of the plunge is actually 320 feet (98 m). The falls are more than that though, as there are two obvious smaller tiers below the main drop as well as one just visible above the main drop. The bottom two drops are 40 and 20 feet (6.1 m) high while the height of the upper drop is not known. In any case, assuming the upper drop is at least 20 feet (6.1 m) high, the falls are likely around 400 feet (120 m) high.

== Debris Flow of 2001 ==
Due to the strong bedrock the falls flow over, the falls themselves were not damaged, but the mudflows still left their mark. A canyon up to 10 feet (3.0 m) deep was carved by the mudflows just below the falls and all plant life lining the creek below the falls was washed away and replaced by dead vegetation. Also, the pool at the base of the main drop was filled in by rock and debris.

== Floods of 2003 and 2006 ==
The floods of 2003 and 2006 actually helped the falls a lot because it removed most of the debris that previously lined the creek below the falls. Once again, due to the strong bedrock the falls flow over, the falls were not altered much.

== See also ==
- List of waterfalls
