= Wilson Glacier (Mount Rainier) =

Glacier

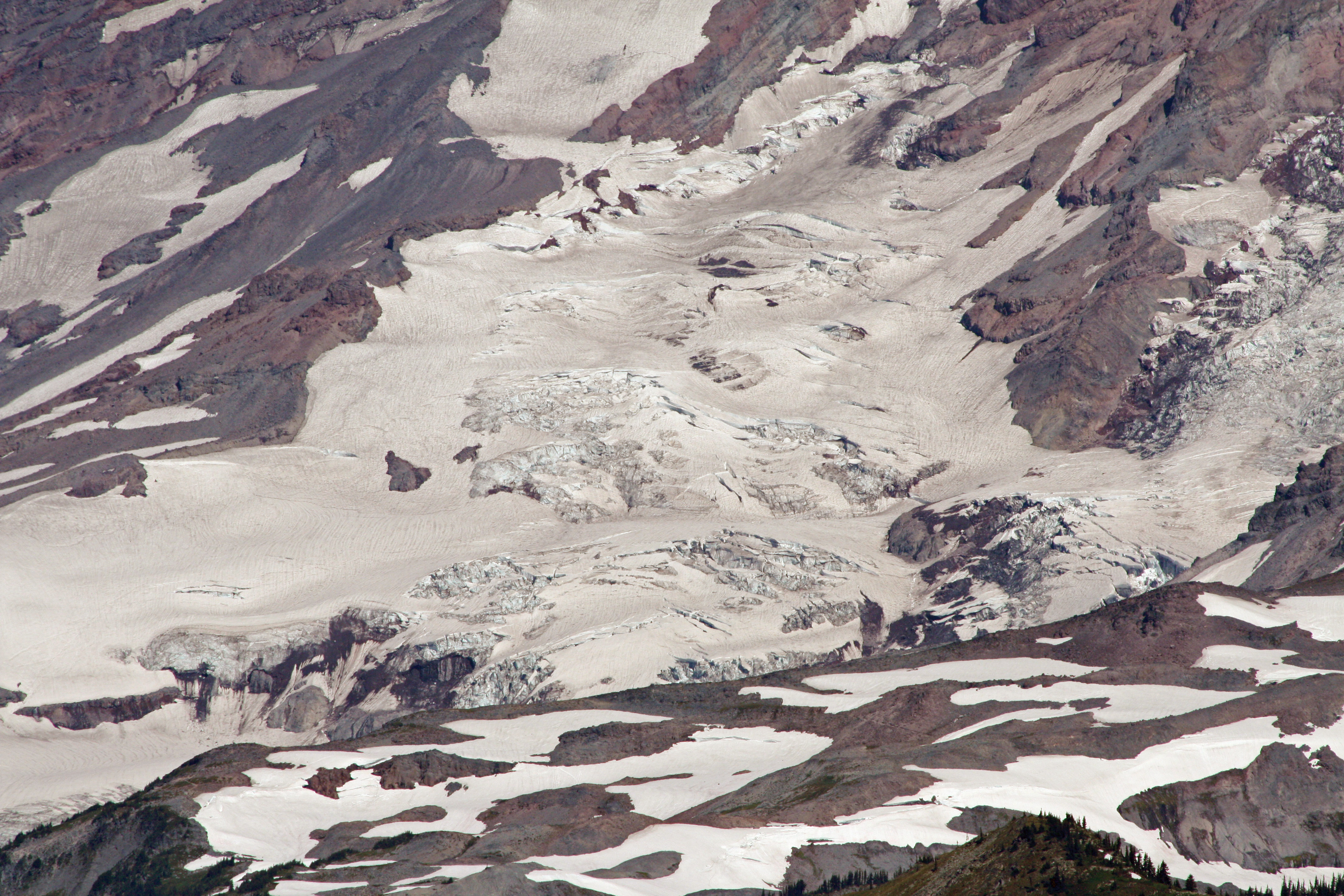
- Interactive map of Wilson Glacier
- Type: Mountain glacier
- Location: Mount Rainier, Pierce County, Washington, USA
- Coordinates: 46°49′19″N 121°45′09″W
- Area: 0.5 square miles (1.3 km^{2}), 1983

The Wilson Glacier is a medium-sized tributary glacier located on the southeast flank of Mount Rainier in Washington. Named after A.D. Wilson, who was part of an early ascent of Mount Rainier, the body of ice has an area of 0.5 square miles (1.3 km^{2}) and has a volume of 1.9 billion feet^{3} (54 million m^{3}). The glacier directly feeds ice to the adjacent, but much larger Nisqually Glacier. Starting from the head at 9,700 feet (3,000 m), the glacier flows downhill southward. One part of the glacier meets the Nisqually Glacier at 8,000 feet (2,400 m) and the other part of the glacier ends on a cliff in between the Wilson and Nisqually Glacier at 7,200 ft (2,200 m). Meltwater from the glacier feeds the Nisqually River.

== See also ==
- List of glaciers
