= P. B. Van Trump =

American mountaineer (1838–1916)

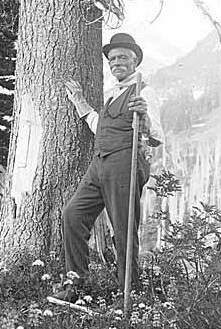
Van Trump around 1909

Philemon Beecher Van Trump (known as P. B. Van Trump; December 18, 1838 – December 27, 1916) was an American pioneering mountaineer and writer who lived in the state of Washington. He is best known for the first documented ascent of Mount Rainier in 1870.

== Early life ==
Van Trump was born in Lancaster, Ohio, on December 18, 1838. His father, Philadelph Van Trump, and his maternal grandfather, Philemon Beecher, represented the Ohio districts in the United States House of Representatives. He was educated at Kenyon College and the New York University.

== Washington ==
In 1867, he moved to Washington Territory as the private secretary to Marshall F. Moore, the seventh governor of the territory. Moore was Van Trump's brother-in-law. Van Trump first saw Mount Rainier in August 1867, and later recalled:

That first true vision of the mountain, revealing so much of its glorious beauty and grandeur, its mighty and sublime form filling up nearly all of the field of direct vision, swelling up from the plain and out of the green forest till its lofty triple summit towered immeasurably above the picturesque foothills, the westering sun flooding with golden light and softening tints its lofty summit, rugged sides and far-sweeping flanks – all this impressed me so indescribably, enthused me so thoroughly, that I then and there vowed, almost with fervency, that I would some day stand upon its glorious summit, if that feat were possible to human effort and endurance.

He and Hazard Stevens made the first documented successful climb of Mount Rainier on August 17, 1870. They climbed the mountain via the Gibraltar Ledges route. Van Trump climbed the mountain at least five other times. Van Trump guided John Muir to the summit of Mount Rainier in 1888. Muir describes this climb in a chapter of his book Steep Trails. Muir and Van Trump kept in touch after the climb. Van Trump joined the Sierra Club in 1893 making him one of their first members outside California. He later served on the Sierra Club committee that campaigned for the creation of Mount Rainier National Park.

After his wife died in 1907, Van Trump took a position greeting tourists at a summer tent camp at Indian Henry's Hunting Ground at Mount Rainier. He served briefly as a seasonal ranger and spent winters with the Longmire family.

== Death and legacy ==
Failing health caused him to relocate to New York in 1915 to spend his final days with relatives. He died on December 27, 1916, and was interred at the Kattellvile Cemetery, Broome County, New York. He had a son and a daughter.

The Stevens–Van Trump Historic Monument along the Skyline Trail in Mount Rainier National Park was erected to commemorate the historic first ascent of the mountain. Van Trump Park (an alpine meadow), Van Trump Creek, and Van Trump Glacier, all in the national park, are named after him. Christine Falls were named for his daughter, Christine.
