= Donald L. Trump =

American oncologist (born 1945)

- Born: Donald Lynn Trump; July 31, 1945 (age 81); Greencastle, Indiana, U.S.
- Other name: "Skip"
- Education: Johns Hopkins University (MD)
- Occupation: Oncologist

Donald Lynn "Skip" Trump (born July 31, 1945) is an American oncologist who has been the executive director and chief executive officer of the Inova Schar Cancer Institute in Falls Church, Virginia, since January 2015. He is not related or affiliated with the current president of the United States, Donald J. Trump.

== Early life and education ==
Donald Lynn Trump was born in Greencastle, Indiana on July 31, 1945, and he grew up in Hudson, New York. He received his undergraduate and medical degrees from Johns Hopkins University, where he also completed his fellowship and residency.

== Career ==
Trump's first academic appointment was at Naval Hospital Philadelphia. His later positions included stints at Johns Hopkins, Duke University, and the University of Pittsburgh. In 2002, he joined Roswell Park Comprehensive Cancer Center as its associate institute director and senior vice president for clinical investigations. In 2007, he became the center's president, a position he held until he retired in December 2014. The chair of Roswell Park's board of directors said that "Roswell Park’s clinical revenues and its unique patient care programs continue to increase as Dr. Trump has been at the forefront of a 'transformation process' at the Institute. Further, he led several important initiatives that have great potential to enhance collaborative relationships with local and regional health care partners, thus benefiting cancer patients not only at Roswell Park, but in upstate New York."

== Shared name with U.S. President Donald Trump ==
In addition to his work in oncology, Trump is known for his shared first and last name with Donald J. Trump. They are not related. He disagrees with Donald J. Trump's political positions and considers the politician's rhetoric "hostile" and "distinctly out of place in public discourse". He did not vote for Trump in the 2016 election and instead voted for his Democratic opponent Hillary Clinton. The oncologist has been dubbed "the other Donald Trump" and has dealt with confusion and mixups for decades regarding the politician, who is one year apart from him in age. The oncologist began increasingly using his nickname "Skip" amid Trump's political rise.

Donald L. Trump contacted the Trump family by letter in the 1980s. After a patient of Dr. Trump reached out to the businessman in 2007, the businessman replied with a letter but declined the suggestion to donate to the cancer center the oncologist led. In 2010, both Donald Trumps spoke on the phone when Donald J. Trump requested his friend's son be admitted into a clinical trial. Though it was too late to add a new patient to the trial, Dr. Trump asked the businessman to shave his head for a "Bald for Bucks" event. The businessman declined, instead sending $30,000 through the Donald J. Trump Foundation. In a video the same year, businessman Trump said, "Donald L. Trump, which is you, is probably more important than Donald J. Trump, which is me."

== Honors and awards ==
Trump has received a Lifetime Achievement Award in Medicine/Business from Medaille College, and a Distinguished Alumnus Award from the Johns Hopkins University Alumni Association.

== See also ==
- Mark S. Zuckerberg
