= Freedom of speech in schools in the United States =

The issue of school speech or curricular speech as it relates to the First Amendment to the United States Constitution has been the center of controversy and litigation since the mid-20th century. The First Amendment's guarantee of freedom of speech applies to students in public schools. In the landmark decision Tinker v. Des Moines Independent Community School District, the U.S. Supreme Court formally recognized that students do not "shed their constitutional rights to freedom of speech or expression at the schoolhouse gate".

The core principles of Tinker remain unaltered, but are clarified by several important decisions, including Bethel School District v. Fraser, Hazelwood School District v. Kuhlmeier, Morse v. Frederick, and Mahanoy Area School District v. B.L. Despite respect for the legitimate educational interests of school officials, the Supreme Court has not abandoned Tinker; it continues to recognize the basis precept of Tinker that viewpoint-specific speech restrictions are an egregious violation of the First Amendment. In Rosenberger v. Rector and Visitors of the University of Virginia, the Supreme Court declared: "Discrimination against speech because of its message is presumed to be unconstitutional". Rosenberger held that denial of funds to a student organization on the sole basis that the funds were used to publish a religiously oriented student newspaper was an unconstitutional violation of the right of free speech guaranteed by the First Amendment. Accordingly, for other on-campus speech that is neither obscene, vulgar, lewd, indecent, or plainly offensive under Fraser nor school-sponsored under Hazelwood nor advocating illegal drugs at a school-sponsored event under Frederick, Tinker applies limiting the authority of schools to regulate the speech, whether on or off-campus, unless it would materially and substantially disrupt classwork and discipline in the school.

== Tinker v. Des Moines ==
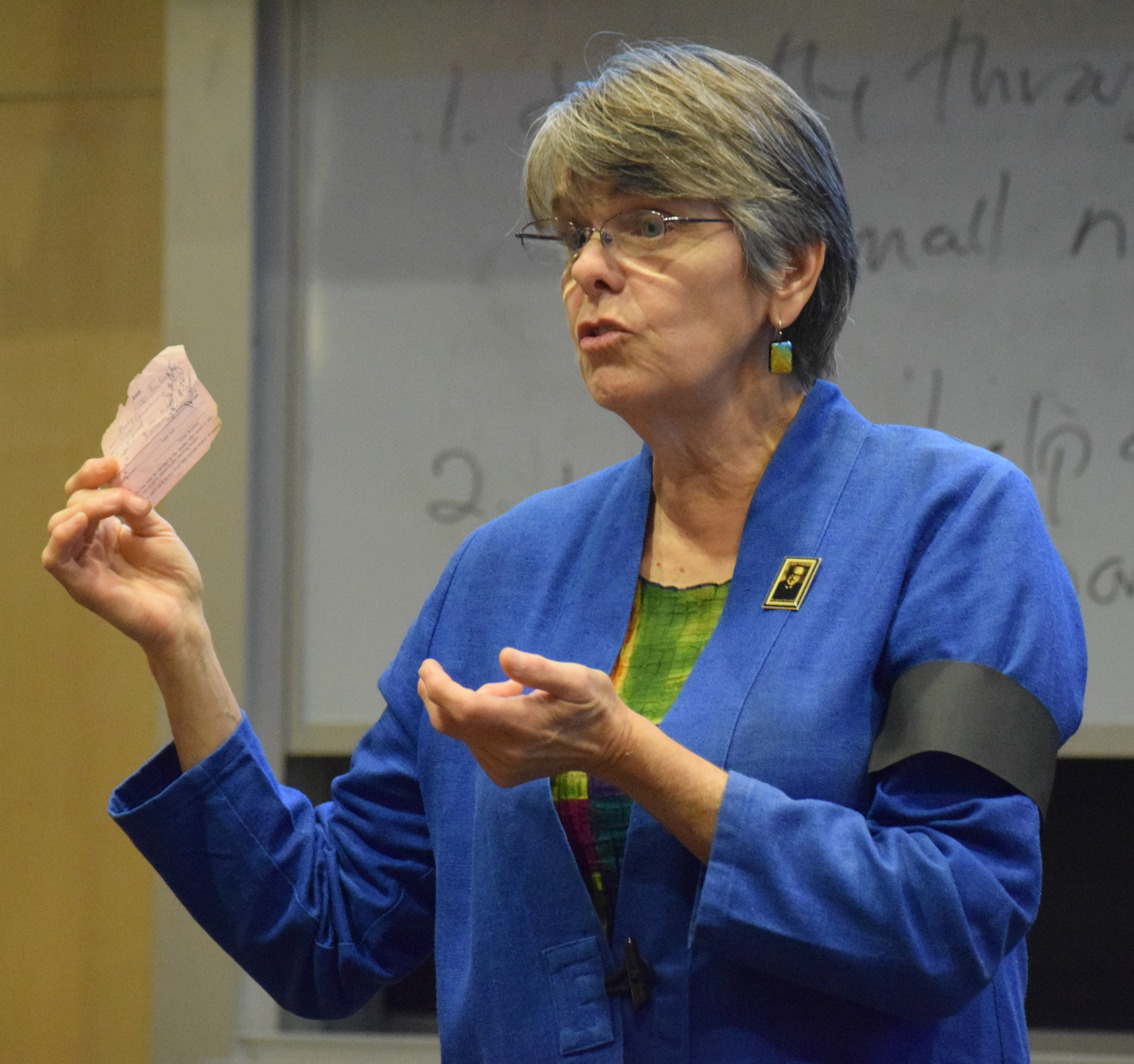
Mary Beth Tinker was given detention for wearing a black armband to protest the Vietnam War, leading to the Tinker v. Des Moines case.

In Tinker, 393 U.S. 503 (1969), several students were suspended for wearing black armbands that protested against the Vietnam War. The Supreme Court ruled broadly that students' freedom of speech was not limited simply for being on school grounds, but schools do have a compelling interest to limit speech that may "materially and substantially interfere with the requirements of appropriate discipline in the operation of the school", what is known as the Tinker test for substantial disruption. In the case of the students wearing the armbands, the Court found their actions to not be considered disruptive, and thus ruled in their favor.

== Bethel School District v. Fraser ==
In Fraser, a high school student was disciplined following his speech to a school assembly at which he nominated a fellow student for a student elective office. The speech contained sexual innuendos, but not obscenities. The Supreme Court found that school officials could discipline the student. In doing so, it recognized that "the process of educating our youth for citizenship in public schools is not confined to books, the curriculum, and the civics class; schools must teach by example the shared values of a civilized social order". Recognizing that one of the important purposes of public education is to inculcate the habits and manners of civility as valued conducive both to happiness and to the practice of self-government, the Supreme Court emphasized that "consciously or otherwise, teachers—and indeed the older students—demonstrate the appropriate form of civil discourse and political expression by their conduct and deportment in and out of class". Under the Fraser standard, school officials look not merely to the reasonable risk of disruption—the Tinker standard—but would also balance the freedom of a student's speech rights against the school's interest in teaching students the boundaries of socially appropriate behavior. Schools have discretion to curtail not only obscene speech, but speech that is vulgar, lewd, indecent, or plainly offensive.

== Hazelwood v. Kuhlmeier ==
The Hazelwood School District case applies the principles set forth in Fraser to curricular matters. In Hazelwood, the Supreme Court upheld a school's decision to censor certain articles in the school newspaper which was produced as part of the school's journalism curriculum. Echoing Fraser, the Supreme Court observed that "[a] school need not tolerate student speech that is inconsistent with 'its basic educational mission'...even though the government could not censor similar speech outside the school". School authorities and educators do not offend the First Amendment by exercising editorial control over the style and content of student speech in school-sponsored expressive activities so long as their actions are reasonably related to legitimate pedagogical concerns.

== Morse v. Frederick ==
Morse v. Frederick blends Fraser and Hazelwood, applying them to a school-sanctioned event or activity. While students were along a public street in front of school watching the Olympic Torch Relay pass through, Frederick unfurled a banner bearing the phrase: "BONG HiTS [sic] 4 JESUS". The banner was in plain view of other students. The high school principal seized the banner and suspended Frederick because the banner was perceived to advocate the use of illegal drugs. The Supreme Court held that a principal may, consistent with the First Amendment, restrict student speech at a school event, when that speech is reasonably viewed as promoting illegal drug use. Not only was a school activity involved, but the banner's promotion of illegal drugs was contrary to the school's policy or mission to prevent student drug abuse.

== Mahanoy Area School District v. B.L. ==
At issue in Mahanoy Area School District v. B.L. was whether the Tinker decision applies to student speech that occurs off campus. The case centered on Brandi Levy, identified as B.L. in pleadings, a student at Mahanoy Area High School in Mahanoy City, Pennsylvania, who posted an angry, profane Snapchat message from an off-campus location after she failed to make the school's varsity cheerleading squad. Though sent to a private circle of friends and deleted later, the message was shown to school staff, and Levy was suspended from cheerleading the next year under the school's policy relating to social media.

In its decision, the Court affirmed that through Tinker, schools may have a valid interest to regulate student speech off-campus that is disruptive, but did not define when this regulation can occur, leaving this open for lower courts in future litigation. The Supreme Court ruled specifically for Levy, holding that the school's interests to prevent disruption under Tinker were not sufficient to overcome her First Amendment rights.

== School-specific factors ==
The right of free speech is not itself absolute: the Court has consistently upheld regulations as to time, place, and manner of speech, provided that they are "reasonable". In applying this reasonableness test to regulations limiting student expression, the Court has recognized that the age and maturity of students is an important factor to be considered.

In the school context, the United States Supreme Court has identified three major relevant considerations:

1. The extent to which the student's speech-in-question poses a substantial threat of disruption (Tinker v. Des Moines Indep. Cmty. Sch. Dist.).
2. Whether the speech is sexually vulgar or obscene (Bethel School District v. Fraser).
3. Whether the speech, if allowed as part of a school activity or function, would be contrary to the basic educational mission of the school (Hazelwood v. Kuhlmeier).

Each of these considerations has given rise to a separate mode of analysis, and in Morse v. Frederick the Court implied that any one of these may serve as an independent basis for restricting student speech.

=== Disruption ===
The problem of disruption is perhaps the most fundamental issue addressed by the courts in student free speech cases.

=== Offensiveness ===
The second major question addressed by the courts is closely related to, but nevertheless distinct from, the question of disruption. This is the question of speech which is offensive to prevailing community standards by reason of being vulgar, lewd, or indecent speech.^{α} Courts have held that offensiveness is a question of whether speech is plainly offensive in terms of sexual content or implication, rather than simply expressing ideas and beliefs considered offensive by some or most students or members of the community. See Saxe v. State College Area School District. In Bethel School District v. Fraser, the Supreme Court recognized the special responsibility of the public schools to inculcate moral values and to teach students the boundaries of socially acceptable behavior. It therefore permitted a public school to discipline a student for making sexually suggestive remarks in an address to a school assembly, even though the remarks were not obscene in the traditional sense.

The ability to regulate inappropriate speech has been found to be especially important in situations where the student speech may have the appearance of being sponsored or endorsed by the school.

In Bethel, the Court held that the offensiveness test does not apply to off-campus speech but has been limited by Morse v. Frederick.

=== Impairing educational mission ===
The third major area of concern addressed in student free speech cases is whether a particular instance of student speech may be viewed as impairing the school's ability to carry out its educational mission. This concern arises where the speech in question occurs in connection with a school-sponsored or school-controlled activity but is inconsistent with a legitimate pedagogical concern. In such circumstances, the United States Supreme Court has found that student speech may be regulated. For example, in Hazelwood School District v. Kuhlmeier, it held that a school may exercise control over the content of a student newspaper when it attempts to address issues of divorce and teenage pregnancy; in Morse v. Frederick, it permitted a school to exercise control over the words displayed on a large banner at a school-sponsored event, when those words convey a message promoting the use of illegal drugs.

These rulings demonstrate the Court's acknowledgment of the obligation placed on schools to preserve educational goals and provide a supportive learning environment. The Court seeks to strike a balance between defending students' rights to free speech and making sure that speech does not interfere with the educational process or compromise the goals of the school by permitting institutions to control student speech under specific conditions.

=== Pure speech ===
One of these factors is whether the activity sought to be controlled is "pure speech", or sufficiently related to the expression of ideas to fall under the umbrella of the First Amendment. "Pure speech" does not need to involve words but is generally represented by symbols or actions.

=== Focus of protected speech activity ===
The focus of the protected speech activity, whether pure speech or not, may affect the propriety of regulation by school officials.

=== Property ===
Even before Morse, the federal appellate circuits had been dealing with the question of whether Tinker applied to speech by students that took place not only off school property but outside the school context entirely, yet was found by administrators to be sufficiently disruptive to punish. The Fifth Circuit was the first circuit, after Tinker, to hear cases involving off-campus student speech when it upheld students' rights to distribute off-campus "underground" newspapers they had produced themselves. In the earlier case, Shanley v. Northeast Independent School District, Bexar County, Texas, the court declined to decide whether Tinker reached off-campus speech. "We do note, however, that it is not at all unusual to allow the geographical location of the actor to determine the constitutional protection that should be afforded to his or her acts", and since the newspaper had only been distributed not only off-campus but outside of school hours, and in an orderly fashion, the school could not constitutionally punish the students for doing so. (Note: Sullivan concerns itself primarily with other issues related to the case. The district court that first heard it held that "[i]n this court's judgment, it makes little sense to extend the influence of school administration to off-campus activity under the theory that such activity might interfere with the function of education. School officials may not judge a student's behavior while he is in his home with his family nor does it seem to this court that they should have jurisdiction over his acts on a public street corner.")

In 1979, the Second Circuit heard the similar Thomas v. Board of Education, Granville Central School District, the appeal of three students disciplined for producing a satirical publication which targeted school officials modeled on the then-popular National Lampoon magazine, including sexual content. While the students had stored copies at school for a while, while preparing them, and sought a teacher's help in proofreading, they had otherwise distanced the publication from the school, printing and distributing it off-campus and including a prominent disclaimer of responsibility for any copies found at the school. (Note: The student petitioner in Boucher v. School Board of Greenfield, heard by the Seventh Circuit in 1998, argued that the underground newspaper containing an article explaining to students how they could crack the district's computer network for which he had been expelled for distributing was off-campus speech since he had prepared it at home, but the court rejected that since it had been distributed on school grounds, as he had stipulated.)

"[A]ll but an insignificant amount of relevant activity in this case was deliberately designed to take place beyond the schoolhouse gate" observed Judge Irving Kaufman, distinguishing the case from Tinker and other school speech cases that had followed it. "Here, because school officials have ventured out of the school yard and into the general community where the freedom accorded expression is at its zenith ... we find that the punishments imposed here cannot withstand the proscription of the First Amendment." Porter v. Ascension Parish School Board, a 2004 Fifth Circuit case, similarly held that a student's drawing of an attack on the school, made at home and kept there for two years until accidentally brought in by his younger brother, was off-campus protected speech.

In the next two decades the advent of digital technology and the Internet made it much easier for students to engage in school-focused speech from their own homes. The Second Circuit was the first to decide a case involving a student's online speech with 2007's Wisniewski v. Board of Education of Weedsport Central School District, holding the school was within its rights in suspending for a semester a middle school student who used as an online avatar an image suggesting he intended to shoot and kill one of his teachers, due to the threat of violence involved and the likelihood that threat would eventually reach the school and cause a reasonably foreseeable threat of disruption, even though he testified the image was only intended as a joke.

The next year, the Second Circuit also heard Doninger v. Niehoff. There, the aggrieved student, angry over what she believed to have been the cancellation of a concert had posted to her blog calling the school administration "douchebags" and urging people to email the superintendent. A panel that included Sonia Sotomayor, later elevated to the Supreme Court, held unanimously that her ensuing suspension and disqualification from student government was constitutional, as her confrontational post angered fellow students and was explicitly intended to reach the school and disrupt the operations of at least the superintendent's office.

In a pair of 2011 cases it reviewed en banc, the Third Circuit ruled against schools that punished students who had created mock MySpace profiles for their principals on their home computers, resolving conflicting holdings by the district courts. In both cases the only school resource used was a freely available photo of the principal posted on the district's website. In both cases the circuit found no distinction from Thomas or Porter and held that the use of the principal's photo was not enough of a nexus with school activity to put the profiles under school authority.

In J.S. ex rel. Snyder v. Blue Mountain School District, one of those cases, two judges commented on the relation between the school setting and the location of the speech as a factor in deciding whether the Tinker line of cases reached speech made on a student's own time, away from school, without the use of any school resources. Judge D. Brooks Smith wrote in a concurrence joined by four other judges, that while he was satisfied that Tinker did not and could not be applied to off-campus speech:

... that is only half the battle. The other half: how can one tell whether speech takes place on or off campus? Answering this question will not always be easy ... The answer plainly cannot turn solely on where the speaker was sitting when the speech was originally uttered. Such a standard would fail to accommodate the somewhat "everywhere at once" nature of the internet. So, for example, I would have no difficulty applying Tinker to a case where a student sent a disruptive email to school faculty from his home computer. Regardless of its place of origin, speech intentionally directed towards a school is properly considered on-campus speech. On the other hand, speech originating off campus does not mutate into on-campus speech simply because it foreseeably makes its way onto campus.

Judge D. Michael Fisher, writing for himself and five other dissenters, primarily argued that the sexual aspects of the student's mock profile of her principal, which the majority had found too exaggerated to be taken seriously, could easily have been taken seriously to the point of injuring not only his reputation but his career and thus were significantly disruptive enough under Tinker to be punishable, without regard to the location, since Tinker had been silent on that. As to her having made the profile at home during a weekend, Fisher wrote that it was unreasonable for her to expect that the profile would not eventually come to the attention of the school community, including the principal she targeted. "The line between 'on-campus' and 'off-campus' speech is not as clear as it once was", he observed, noting the increasing prevalence of smartphones brought to school by students. "[W]ith near-constant student access to social networking sites on and off campus, when offensive and malicious speech is directed at school officials and disseminated online to the student body, it is reasonable to anticipate an impact on the classroom environment. I fear that our Court has adopted a rule that will prove untenable." (Note: Fisher distinguished J.S. from Layshock in this regard by noting that in the other case the school district had not argued on appeal that the profile page carried a reasonable foreseeability of disruption to the school environment.)

Within a year two other circuits held in favor of schools punishing students for online off-campus speech. The Fourth Circuit held for a school district's discipline of a student who had created, after school one day, a MySpace page devoted to ridiculing a classmate which other students had joined and shared content on, since it had led to a complaint from the other student's parents that it violated the school's anti-bullying policies, and their daughter did not feel comfortable going to class the next day, which the court found substantially disruptive under Tinker. The Eighth Circuit reversed a district court's preliminary injunction against a school district that had suspended twins who ran a website about their high school, since the site had been "directed" at the school, and racist and sexist remarks on it had caused substantial disruption when, despite the twins' intent to keep it largely to themselves and some close friends, the content became widely viewed and discussed among the student body.

The Ninth Circuit had in 2001's LaVine v. Blaine School District ruled in favor of a school district that briefly expelled a student who shared a disturbing poem he had written at home, suggesting plans to engage in a school shooting, with his English teacher. It acknowledged in a later case where it upheld the discipline of a student who had regularly posted writings suggesting he was seriously considering a school shooting to his MySpace page that while LaVine had involved the issue of where the speech occurred, it had not found it dispositive nor discussed it. "One of the difficulties with the student speech cases", Judge M. Margaret McKeown acknowledged, "is an effort to divine and impose a global standard for a myriad of circumstances involving off-campus speech. A student's profanity-laced parody of a principal is hardly the same as a threat of a school shooting, and we are reluctant to try and craft a one-size fits all approach." In that case, the court held, it was not necessary to adopt any of the tests proposed in other circuits since the threatening nature of the speech satisfied all of them.

In 2015 the Fifth Circuit was again explicitly asked to determine whether Tinker applied to off-campus speech; this time the court, hearing the case en banc, accepted. The petitioner in Bell v. Itawamba County School District had posted a profanity-laced rap on his Facebook and YouTube pages accusing two coaches of sexual misconduct with female students and threatening violence against them. "Bell's position is untenable; it fails to account for evolving technological developments," Judge Rhesa Barksdale wrote for the majority, citing the threatening statements in the rap, and the disruption it caused, as outweighing its off-campus origin and thus coming under Tinker. Other judges on the circuit differed. E. Grady Jolly proposed a standard that would have held student speech unprotected if it were actually threatening to students or staff in the school environment and communicated directly to the school, students or staff. James L. Dennis's lengthy dissent, one of several, joined by one other judge and another one in part, accused the majority of misreading many of the precedents it cited; he also believed that the rap was addressing matters of public concern with its allegations against the coaches and thus was entitled to greater protection. "[Its] vague framework fails to provide constitutionally adequate notice of when student speech crosses the line between permissible and punishable off-campus expression", he wrote. Edward C. Prado, who had joined Dennis's dissent in part, said that the circuit should wait for the Supreme Court to decide the issue instead of attempting to do so on its own.

== The "Chicago Statement" ==
In July 2014, the University of Chicago released the "Chicago Statement", a free speech policy statement designed to combat censorship on campus. This statement was later adopted by a number of top-ranked universities including Princeton University, Washington University in St. Louis, and Columbia University.

== See also ==
- Broussard v. School Board of Norfolk, 801 F. Supp. 1526 (E.D. Va. 1992)
- Lamb's Chapel v. Center Moriches Union Free School District, 508 U.S. 384 (1993)
- Desilets v. Clearview Regional Board of Education, 647 A.2d. 150 (N.J. 1994)
- Dean v. Utica Community Schools, 345 F.Supp.2d 799 (E.D. Mich. 2004)
- Bias response team
- Censorship of student media in the United States

== Notes ==
^α See also Vagueness doctrine
