= Lamb's Chapel v. Center Moriches Union Free School District =

- Supreme Court of the United States

Argued February 24, 1993 Decided June 7, 1993
- Full case name: Lamb's Chapel v. Center Moriches Union Free School District
- Citations: 508 U.S. 384 (more) 113 S. Ct. 2141; 124 L. Ed. 2d 352

Case history
- Prior: Injunction denied, 736 F. Supp. 1247 (E.D.N.Y. 1990); summary judgment granted, 770 F. Supp. 91 (E.D.N.Y. 1991); affirmed, 959 F.2d 381 (2d Cir. 1992); cert. granted, 506 U.S. 813 (1992).
- Subsequent: On remand, 17 F.3d 1425 (2d Cir. 1994)

Holding
- Under the Free Speech Clause of the First Amendment, a public school may not refuse to allow religious films.

Court membership
- Chief Justice William Rehnquist Associate Justices Byron White · Harry Blackmun; John P. Stevens · Sandra Day O'Connor; Antonin Scalia · Anthony Kennedy; David Souter · Clarence Thomas

Case opinions
- Majority: White, joined by Rehnquist, Blackmun, Stevens, O'Connor, Souter
- Concurrence: Kennedy (in part)
- Concurrence: Scalia (in judgment), joined by Thomas

Laws applied
- U.S. Const. amend. I

Lamb's Chapel v. Center Moriches Union Free School District, 508 U.S. 384 (1993), was a decision by the Supreme Court of the United States concerning whether the Free Speech Clause of the First Amendment was offended by a school district that refused to allow a church access to school premises to show films dealing with family and child-rearing issues faced by parents. In a unanimous decision, the court concluded that it was.

== Case summary ==
The case arose in Center Moriches, New York, where state law authorized school boards to promulgate regulations for the use of school property outside of school hours. The Lamb's Chapel evangelical church sought to show a series of family lectures by James Dobson on school property belonging to the Center Moriches Union Free School District. The local board refused on the grounds that the film "appear[ed] to be church related," 508 U.S. at 389, whereafter the church sued. The district court rejected their claims, finding that the school was a limited public forum, and that because "the District had not opened its facilities to organizations similar to Lamb's Chapel for religious purposes, ... the denial ... was viewpoint neutral and, hence, not a violation of the Freedom of Speech Clause." Id. at 389-90. The Court of Appeals affirmed, and the matter came before the Supreme Court.

Writing for the court, Justice Byron White observed that the courts below missed the point: "That all religions and all uses for religious purposes are treated alike ... does not answer the critical question whether it discriminates on the basis of to permit school property to be used for the presentation of all views about family issues and child rearing except those dealing with the subject matter from a religious standpoint." The subject of the films was permitted; the viewpoint was the problem: "[the] exhibition was denied solely because the series dealt with the subject from a religious standpoint." This constituted viewpoint discrimination and could not withstand First Amendment scrutiny.

Three justices concurred in the judgment. The Court had, in passing, invoked the landmark Lemon v. Kurtzman (1971) case, which remained good law, to the consternation of some of the concurring justices. Justice Antonin Scalia, joined by Justice Clarence Thomas, wrote:

Like some ghoul in a late-night horror movie that repeatedly sits up in its grave and shuffles abroad, after being repeatedly killed and buried, Lemon stalks our Establishment Clause jurisprudence once again, frightening the little children and school attorneys of Center Moriches Union Free School District. Its most recent burial, only last Term, was, to be sure, not fully six feet under: Our decision in Lee v. Weisman conspicuously avoided using the supposed "test" but also declined the invitation to repudiate it. Over the years, however, no fewer than five of the currently sitting Justices have, in their own opinions, personally driven pencils through the creature's heart (the author of today's opinion repeatedly), and a sixth has joined an opinion doing so.

The secret of the Lemon test's survival, I think, is that it is so easy to kill. It is there to scare us (and our audience) when we wish it to do so, but we can command it to return to the tomb at will. When we wish to strike down a practice it forbids, we invoke it; when we wish to uphold a practice it forbids, we ignore it entirely. Sometimes, we take a middle course, calling its three prongs 'no more than helpful signposts.' Such a docile and useful monster is worth keeping around, at least in a somnolent state; one never knows when one might need him. (Citations omitted.)

== See also ==
- Freedom of speech in the United States
- School speech cases:
  - Tinker v. Des Moines Independent Community School District (1969)
  - Bethel School District v. Fraser (1986)
  - Hazelwood v. Kuhlmeier (1988)
  - Rosenberger v. University of Virginia (1995)
  - Guiles v. Marineau (2d. Cir. 2006)
  - Morse v. Frederick (2007)
- List of United States Supreme Court cases
  - Lists of United States Supreme Court cases by volume
  - List of United States Supreme Court cases, volume 508
  - List of United States Supreme Court cases by the Rehnquist Court
