= Desilets v. Clearview Regional Board of Education =

New Jersey Supreme Court decision

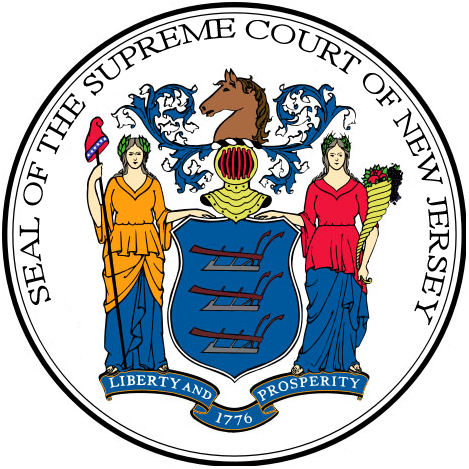
- Court: Supreme Court of New Jersey
- Full case name: Patricia Desilets, on Behalf of and as natural guardian of Brien Desliets, Plaintiff-Respondent, v. Clearview Regional Board of Education, Michael P. Toscano, Superintendent and Charles Bishop, Principal, Defendants-Appellants
- Decided: September 22, 1994
- Citations: 137 N.J. 585; 647 A.2d 150 (1994)

Case history
- Prior actions: Desilets v. Clearview Regional Bd. of Educ., 266 N.J.Super. 531, 630 A.2d 333 (1993); certification granted, 134 N.J. 565, 636 A.2d 522 (1993)

Holding
- The exclusion by a public school of a student's article in an extracurricular student newspaper without any specific educational policy justification violated the students' right to free speech under the First Amendment.

Court membership
- Chief Justice: Robert N. Wilentz
- Associate Justices: Robert L. Clifford, Stewart G. Pollock, Daniel J. O'Hern, Alan B. Handler, Marie L. Garibaldi, Gary S. Stein

Case opinions
- Per curiam
- Concurrence: Clifford, Stein (all but Part III)
- Concur/dissent: Pollock, joined by Wilentz

Laws applied
- U.S. Const. amend. I

Desilets v. Clearview Regional Board of Education, 137 N.J. 585 (1994), was a New Jersey Supreme Court decision that held that public school curricular student newspapers that have not been established as forums for student expression are subject to a lower level of First Amendment protection than independent student expression or newspapers established (by policy or practice) as forums for student expression.

== Background ==
The Clearview Regional High School District had an extracurricular club that produced the Pioneer Press student newspaper. Brien Desilents, a student member of the club, submitted movie reviews for Mississippi Burning and Rain Man but the school principal blocked them from being printed, not because the reviews themselves were problematic, but because the underlying movies were R-rated. The student's mother then filed suit in state court claiming violations of both the federal and state constitution. The New Jersey Supreme Court did find that the school paper was not a public forum. However, because they held that the school did not have a consistent policy related to "pedagogical concerns" they felt that in this circumstance censorship was not warranted. The Student Press Law Center explains "in Desilets v. Clearview Regional Board of Education the New Jersey Supreme Court rejected school officials' justifications for censoring reviews of R-rated movies from a student newspaper under the Hazelwood standard as "equivocal and inconsistent." The court noted that there was nothing offensive in the reviews, that R-rated movies were discussed in class by teachers, that such reviews were available in the school library and that the student newspaper had, in fact, reviewed such movies in the past." Also another source states, " HELD: The judgment of the Appellate Division is affirmed, substantially for the reasons expressed in the majority opinion below. The Court also determines that the school, as a non-public forum, failed to prove that it had established a policy related to legitimate pedagogical concerns."

== Basis ==
The First Amendment Freedom of Speech clause was not violated by the school district because the First Amendment protection for student expression described in Tinker v. Des Moines Independent Community School District does not compel a public school to affirmatively sponsor speech that conflicts with its educational goals. The school-funded newspaper at issue was also not considered to be a public forum under the totality of circumstances present in the case, and therefore, its editors were entitled to a lower level of First Amendment protection than is applicable to independent student newspapers or those newspapers that have, by policy or practice, opened their pages to student opinion. "The trial court ruled that the school principal's decision to delete the pupil's movie reviews from the school newspaper did not violate his expressional rights under the First Amendment of the Federal Constitution because such action was reasonably related to legitimate pedagogical concerns, as required by the United States Supreme Court in Hazelwood School District v. Kuhlmeier." Nevertheless, the trial court determined that the student's rights had been violated under the State Constitution, which, it found, provided broader protection of free expression than the First Amendment.

== Precedent ==
Under the First Amendment, school officials can censor curricular, non-forum student newspapers when they can justify their decision with a legitimate pedagogical (i.e., educational) justification. Subsequent decisions, such as the decision in Dean v. Utica Community Schools, 345 F.Supp.2d 799 (E.D. Mich. 2004), have made clear that this is not carte blanche for school officials to censor articles wantonly or based on personal opinion.

Some states have passed laws guaranteeing that curricular, non-forum newspapers (those at issue in Hazelwood) have greater rights than the First Amendment requires.

== See also ==
- Freedom of speech in schools in the United States
- Tinker v. Des Moines Independent Community School District, 393 U.S. 503 (1969)
- Bethel School District v. Fraser, 478 U.S. 675 (1986)
- Hazelwood School District v. Kuhlmeier, 484 U.S. 260 (1988)
- Broussard v. School Board of Norfolk, 801 F. Supp. 1526 (E.D. Va. 1992)
- Morse v. Frederick, 551 U.S. 393 (2007)
