= Guiles v. Marineau =

- Court: United States Court of Appeals for the Second Circuit
- Full case name: Zachary Guiles, by his father and next friend, Timothy Guiles and by his mother and next friend Cynthia Lucas, v. Seth Marineau, Kathleen Morris-Kortz, Douglas Shoik and Rodney Graham
- Argued: October 28, 2005
- Decided: August 30, 2006
- Citation: 461 F.3d 320

Case history
- Prior history: 349 F. Supp. 2d 871 (D. Vt. 2004)
- Subsequent history: Cert. denied, 127 S.Ct. 3054 (2007)

Holding
- The court held that it is a violation of the First and Fourteenth Amendments for a public school to require a student to partially obscure images relating to drugs and alcohol on a shirt criticizing the President of the United States.

Court membership
- Judges sitting: Richard J. Cardamone, Rosemary S. Pooler, Sonia Sotomayor

Case opinions
- Majority: Cardamone, joined by a unanimous court

Laws applied
- First Amendment

In Guiles v. Marineau, 461 F.3d 320 (2d. Cir. 2006), cert. denied by 127 S.Ct. 3054 (2007), the U.S. Court of Appeals for the Second Circuit held that the First and Fourteenth Amendments to the Constitution of the United States protect the right of a student in the public schools to wear a shirt insulting the President of the United States and depicting images relating to drugs and alcohol.

== Overview ==
The First Amendment to the Constitution of the United States prohibits Congress, among other things, from passing any law "abridging the freedom of speech." The Fourteenth Amendment likewise prohibits State governments from "depriv[ing] any person of life, liberty, or property, without due process of law." The courts have interpreted the "liberty" guaranteed by the Fourteenth Amendment to encompass the freedom of speech protected by the First Amendment. See, e.g., Edwards v. South Carolina, 372 U.S. 229, 235 (1963); Near v. Minnesota, 283 U.S. 697, 707 (1931); Stromberg v. California, 283 U.S. 359, 368 (1931).

== Factual background ==
The plaintiff in this case, a student at Williamstown Middle High School in Vermont, had worn a T-shirt displaying the name "George W. Bush" and the words "Chicken-Hawk-In-Chief," underneath of which there was "a large picture of the President's face, wearing a helmet, superimposed on the body of a chicken." Alongside the picture of the President was a depiction of "three lines of cocaine and a razor blade." The wings of the "chicken" were depicted holding a straw and an alcoholic beverage. At the bottom of and on the back of the T-shirt there was additional verbiage making fun of Bush and, among other things, accusing him of being addicted to cocaine. Depictions of Bush, cocaine and alcohol were also present on the sleeves. After plaintiff had worn this shirt several times over a period of weeks, another student complained to a teacher, but was informed that the shirt constituted political speech, protected by law. However, after receiving a complaint from a parent, the defendant in the case, a school employee, asked the student to cover up the parts of the shirt pertaining to drugs and alcohol, or turn the shirt inside-out, or wear a different shirt, in accordance with the school system's dress code, which prohibits "any aspect of a" student's "appearance, which constitutes a real hazard to the health and safety of self and others or is otherwise distracting," (emphasis added) including "[c]lothing displaying alcohol, drugs, violence, obscenity, and racism."

The student refused, and after the student's father had the opportunity to speak with the superintendent, the defendant school administrator completed a "discipline referral form" and sent the student home. After the student returned to school, he wore the T-shirt covered by duct tape (as required by the school), on top of which was written the word "censored."

The student sued the school administrators (the student support specialist, the principal and the superintendent) in order to have the disciplinary referral expunged from his record, and to enjoin the school from enforcing the dress code policy against him. The district court, applying the Supreme Court precedent set in Bethel School District No. 403 v. Fraser, held that the images depicted on the shirt were "plainly offensive or inappropriate" and that the school was therefore entitled to enforce its dress-code policy, but also ordered the expungement of the offense from the student's disciplinary record. Both the plaintiffs and the defendant appealed.

== Decision ==
The court of appeals held that the T-shirt, in spite of its depiction of drugs and alcohol, was protected speech under the First and Fourteenth Amendments to the Constitution of the United States.

In its decision, the court analyzed the facts in light of the following three Supreme Court cases: Tinker v. Des Moines Indep. Cmty. Sch. Dist., 393 U.S. 503 (1969), Bethel School District No. 403 v. Fraser, 478 U.S. 675 (1986) and Hazelwood Sch. Dist. v. Kuhlmeier, 484 U.S. 260 (1988).

In Tinker, the United States Supreme Court held that a school may not ban students from wearing black armbands in protest of the Vietnam War. The Tinker case thus stands for the proposition that "a student may 'express his opinions, even on controversial subjects ... if he does so without materially and substantially interfer[ing] with the requirements of appropriate discipline in the operation of the school and without colliding with the rights of others,' Tinker 393 U.S. at 513 (alteration in original). The rule of Tinker has come to mean that a school may not regulate student expression unless the regulation may be 'justified by a showing that the student['s] [speech] would materially and substantially disrupt the work and discipline of the school.'"

In Fraser, however, the Supreme Court held that a school could discipline a student for making a speech at a public assembly that "is 'vulgar,' 'lewd,' 'indecent,' or 'plainly offensive.'" Fraser can be thought of as an exception to the general rule set forth in Tinker: student speech is generally protected under the Constitution, but the protection does not apply if the speech is "plainly offensive." Whether Guiles' T-shirt was plainly offensive or not was a question of first impression in the Second Circuit; in this case, considering an analogous decision in Frederick v. Morse, 439 F.3d 1114 (9th Cir. 2006), the court held that the T-shirt is not "plainly offensive," and therefore falls within the protection of the Constitution as interpreted in Tinker, rather than being subject to regulation in accordance with Fraser. [The holding in Frederick v. Morse was subsequently overruled by the Supreme Court, but this does not affect the precedential value of Guiles v. Marineau within the Second Circuit.]

In Hazelwood, the Supreme Court permitted schools to regulate the content of a school newspaper, on the grounds that there is a "distinction between school-sponsored speech and student speech.". The student's T-shirt was not school-sponsored, nor was there any appearance of sponsorship by the school, and therefore Hazelwood was inapplicable in this case.

Finally, the Guiles court held that the plaintiff's rights were violated even by the limited intervention of the school staff (who had given the plaintiff the choice of changing shirts, wearing the shirt inside out, or covering the depictions of drugs and alcohol). The court stated that "[t]he pictures" that the school administrators wanted the student to obscure "are an important part of the political message" that he "wished to convey, accentuating the anti-drug (and anti-Bush) message. By covering them defendants diluted the student's "message, blunting its force and impact. Such censorship may be justified under Tinker only when the substantial disruption test is satisfied." As the student had worn the shirt on several days with no disruption to classroom activities, there are no grounds for the school to take any action against him.

== See also ==
- Broussard v. School Board of Norfolk: a similar student T-shirt case

== Notes ==
The citations in this article are written in Bluebook style. Please see the talk page for more information.

== Bibliography ==
- Amendments to the Constitution of the United States
- case summary from firstamendmentcenter.org First Amendment Center
- Helen Nguyen. "2nd Circuit rules censoring student's T-shirt violated free speech." Daily Record (Rochester, NY) (Sept 12, 2006): NA. General Reference Center Gold. Gale. Montgomery County Public Library (MD). 5 May 2008 <http://find.galegroup.com/itx/start.do?prodId=GRGM>
- Jenny B. Davis "Student, Parents Sue School District Over Dress Code." Texas Lawyer (April 7, 2008): NA. General Reference Center Gold. Gale. Montgomery County Public Library (MD). 8 May 2008 (discussion of a new case that is similar to the Guiles case). <http://find.galegroup.com/itx/start.do?prodId=GRGM>
