= Kincaid v. Gibson =

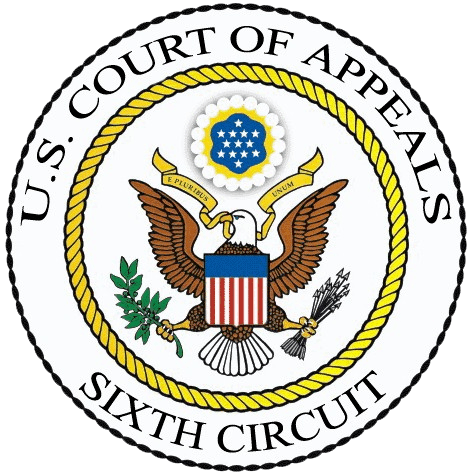
- Court: United States Court of Appeals for the Sixth Circuit
- Full case name: Charles Kincaid, et al v. Betty Gibson, et al
- Argued: May 30, 2000
- Decided: January 5, 2001
- Citation: 236 F. 3d 342 (6th Cir. 2001)

Case history
- Prior history: 191 F.3d 719 (1999); Rehearing en banc granted, 197 F.3d 828 (1999)

Court membership
- Judges sitting: Boyce F. Martin Jr., Gilbert S. Merritt Jr., James L. Ryan, Danny Julian Boggs, Alan Eugene Norris, Richard Fred Suhrheinrich, Eugene Edward Siler Jr., Alice M. Batchelder, Martha Craig Daughtrey, Karen Nelson Moore, R. Guy Cole Jr., Eric L. Clay, Ronald Lee Gilman

Case opinions
- Majority: Cole, joined by Martin, Merritt, Siler, Daughtrey, Moore, Clay, Gilman
- Concurrence: Ryan
- Concur/dissent: Boggs
- Dissent: Norris, joined by Suhrheinrich, Batchelder

Laws applied
- First Amendment

Kincaid v. Gibson, 236 F. 3d 342 (6th Cir. 2001) was a United States court case before the United States Court of Appeals for the Sixth Circuit dealing with freedom of expression.

Charles Kincaid and Carpi Coffer, students at Kentucky State University, filed the suit against Betty Gibson, KSU's Vice President for Student Affairs.

In 1994, the Kentucky State University administration reviewed the school yearbook, The Thorobred, and decided that its quality was not satisfactory. In particular, the administration felt as though the yearbook featured too many images related to current events and objected to the lack of school colors on the yearbook cover, among other things.

Charles Kincaid and Carpi Coffer filed suit on behalf of the students against Gibson and the members of the university's Board of Regents. Initially, the lower courts granted the university's motion to dismiss—citing Hazelwood v. Kuhlmeier as an example of how students' speech in a school-sponsored setting can be censored by administrations. Eventually, the case made it to the Sixth Court of Appeals, who affirmed the District Court's dismissal. The students then appealed to have the circuit court rule en banc, a motion which the Court of appeals granted. The en bank panel of the court heard the case on May 30, 2000, and decided in favor of the students with a 10-3 majority on January 5, 2001.

Kincaid v. Gibson was influential in deciding that Hazelwood v. Kuhlmeier, which allowed school districts to censor material in a school publications, did not apply to colleges and universities.

In early 2001, the parties reached a settlement, with KSU paying each student plaintiff $5,000 and attorney's fees of $60,000. As a part of the settlement, all students received the yearbook they had paid for in 1994.
