= Hosty v. Carter =

- Court: United States Court of Appeals for the Seventh Circuit
- Full case name: Margaret L. HOSTY, Jeni S. Porche, and Steven P. Barba, Plaintiffs-Appellees, v. Patricia CARTER, Defendant-Appellant, Governors State University, et al., Defendants.
- Decided: June 20, 2005

Case history
- Related action: Hazelwood v. Kuhlmeier

Court membership
- Judges sitting: Joel Martin Flaum, Richard Posner, John Louis Coffey, Frank H. Easterbrook, Kenneth Francis Ripple, Daniel Anthony Manion, Michael Stephen Kanne, Ilana Rovner, Diane Pamela Wood, Terence T. Evans, Ann Claire Williams

Hosty v. Carter was a 2005 decision by the United States Court of Appeals for the Seventh Circuit that limited the free press rights of college newspapers.

== Background ==
In October 2000, the editor of Governors State University's student newspaper, The Innovator, was told by Dean Patricia Carter to hold future issues until they were approved of by a school administrator, because it had published stories and editorials critical of the administration. This was done despite a policy stating that student newspaper staff would "determine content and format of their respective publications without censorship or advance approval."

Journalists Margaret Hosty, Jeni Porche, and Steven Barba filed suit against the University and Dean Carter in January 2001. A federal district court allowed the case to go forward in November 2001. The school appealed in early 2002.

== Holding ==
The court of appeals held that college newspapers could be subject to the same amount of school control allowed under Hazelwood v. Kuhlmeier (1988) for high school newspapers.
