= Broussard v. School Board of Norfolk =

1992 US court case

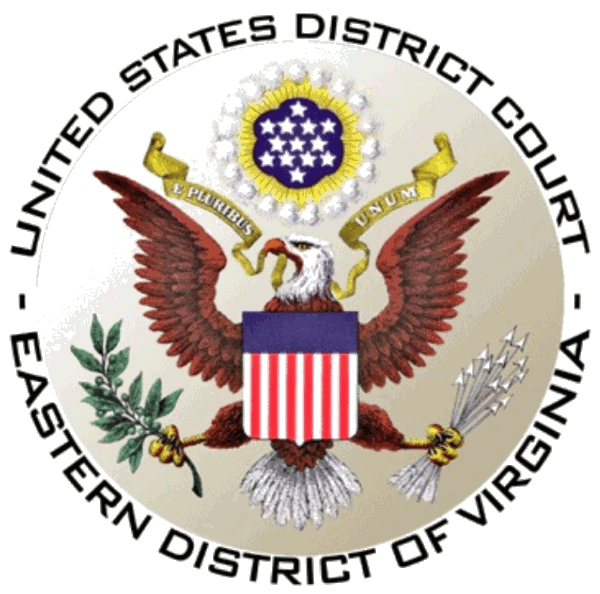
- Court: United States District Court for the Eastern District of Virginia
- Full case name: Broussard by Lord v. School Board of City of Norfolk
- Decided: September 3, 1992
- Docket nos.: 2:92-cv-71
- Citation: 801 F. Supp. 1526

Court membership
- Judge sitting: Robert G. Doumar

Broussard v. School Board of Norfolk, 801 F. Supp. 1526 (E.D. Va. 1992) was a court case that took place in Norfolk, Virginia, United States in 1992. Kimberly Broussard, a middle school student was disciplined by the Norfolk Public Schools for wearing a t-shirt that read "Drugs Suck". When her parents sued on her behalf, her lawyer claimed that her shirt was a form of free speech protected by the First Amendment of the United States Constitution and the Tinker Standard. The United States District Court for the Eastern District of Virginia ruled in favor of the school board, saying that although the shirt displayed an anti-drug message, the word "suck" was a vulgar word with a sexual connotation and therefore not allowed in school.

== See also ==
- School speech
  - Guiles v. Marineau: a similar case with student T-shirts
  - Tinker v. Des Moines Independent Community School District, 393 U.S. 503 (1969)
  - Bethel School District v. Fraser, 478 U.S. 675 (1986)
  - Morse v. Frederick, 551 U.S. 393 (2007)
- Obscenity
  - Cohen v. California, 403 U.S. 15 (1971)
  - Miller v. California, 413 U.S. 15 (1973)
