= 2002 Winter Olympics torch relay =

- Host city: Salt Lake City, Utah, United States
- Countries visited: Greece, United States
- Distance: 13,500 miles (21,700 km)
- Torchbearers: 12,012
- Theme: Light the Fire Within
- Start date: November 19, 2001
- End date: February 8, 2002

The 2002 Winter Olympics torch relay was a 65-day run, from December 4, 2001, until February 8, 2002, prior to the 2002 Winter Olympics. The runners carried the Olympic Flame throughout the United States – following its lighting in Olympia, Greece, to the opening ceremony of the 2002 games at Rice-Eccles Stadium in Salt Lake City, Utah. The 2002 torch relay was also the 50th anniversary of the Winter Olympic torch relay, which was first run during the 1952 Winter Olympics.

== Planning ==
Preparations for the torch relay began in March 1999, when the Salt Lake Organizing Committee (SLOC) issued a Request for Proposals from contractors to plan the relay route, including security and marketing plans. In May, the contract was awarded to Além International Management, Inc., a logistics consulting firm which had previously organized the Olympic torch relays in 1996 and 1998, and was then planning the relay for 2000. Planning of the relay itself began in June, with organizers announcing that the scope of the event would be determined by sponsorships, as all organizing costs would be paid by the relay's sponsors as opposed to state and national governments.

In February 2000, The Coca-Cola Company and Chevrolet signed an agreement with SLOC to become the official relay sponsors, agreeing to pay two-thirds of the $25 million relay cost. The remainder of the cost would be paid for by official relay providers, such as Delta Air Lines, who flew the flame from Greece to the United States, and Union Pacific, whose trains transported the flame through parts of the United States.

The route produced by SLOC and Além was announced to the public on December 4, 2000. It would have the torch cover 13,500 miles (21,700 km), passing through 46 of the 50 U.S. states, and be carried by 12,012 torchbearers. The torch would pass through 300 communities, stopping twice a day: once for a midday celebration and then in a larger populated city for the night. 120 of the 300 communities would host the special celebrations, which would allow large groups of people to participate in the Olympic spirit. It also allowed each community to show off local talent, its people, and history. Atlanta, New York City, and Salt Lake City were all selected as special signature cities, and they would host large relay celebrations which would be paid for, planned, and controlled by SLOC. Later plans for special commemorations of September 11, 2001, along the relay route in Washington, D.C., and New York City, would be added to the route plan. The torch and all relay marketing would be designed to closely follow the 2002 Olympic theme Light the Fire Within and the look of the games theme Land of Contrast - Fire and Ice.

In February 2001, the nomination process for torchbearers was begun. SLOC had decided on a theme of Inspire for the Torchbearers, and people were encouraged to nominate those who inspire others. Of the 12,012 torchbearer positions, SLOC, Coca-Cola, and Chevrolet each got to select one-third of the nominees, while a few were reserved for providers and special guests at the Opening Ceremony. SLOC received approximately 50,000 nominations for its 3,500 positions, so applications were separated by ZIP code then sent to a local community judging panel who scored the applications and selected the torchbearers for their area. Coca-Cola and Chevrolet both received more than 120,000 applications for their positions, and both used a random selection process to choose torchbearers.

SLOC president Mitt Romney was scheduled to release the names of the selected torchbearers in a press conference at New York City's Battery Park on September 12, 2001. The press conference had initially been set for the morning of September 11, but it was postponed by one day to allow Romney to lobby Congress for additional Olympics security funding. The event was canceled entirely due to the September 11 attacks, which destroyed the World Trade Center towers a few blocks away from the park. The announcement of the torchbearers' names was postponed until October 4, when they were unveiled in an event on the steps of the Utah State Capitol.

== Relay elements ==
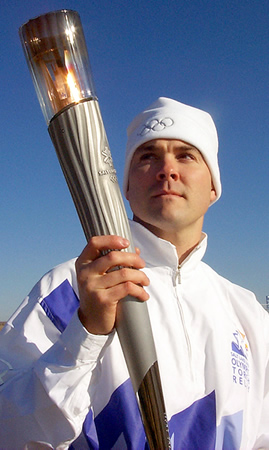
John Nowak, a torchbearer, in Olympic livery with 2002 Olympic Torch

=== Torch ===
The 2002 Olympic Torch, engineered and manufactured by Coleman, was modeled after an icicle, with a slight curve to represent speed and fluidity. The Torch measured 33 inches (84 cm) long, 3 inches (7.6 cm) wide at the top, 0.5 inches (1.3 cm) at the bottom, and was designed by Axiom Design of Salt Lake City. It was created with three sections, each with its own meaning and representation.

The top section was glass, and the Olympic flame burned within the glass, echoing the 2002 Olympic theme Light the Fire Within. The glass stood for purity, winter, ice, and nature. Also inside the glass was a geometric copper structure which helped hold the flame. Copper is a very important natural element of Utah, and represented fire, warmth, Utah's History, and mirrored the orange/red colors of the theme Fire and Ice. The center section was made of silver and finished to look old and worn, while the bottom section was made of clean, highly polished silver. The center section represented the silver mining heritage of the American West, while the bottom section represented the future and modern technology. The Torchbearer gripped the torch at the junction of both the aged and polished silver, during which their hand represented a bridge from the past to the present. The two silver sections also mirrored the blue/purple colors of the Fire and Ice theme.

=== Modes of transportation ===
The Olympic torch was carried through a variety of modes, including runners, skiers, motor vehicles, aircraft, boats, canoes, and bicycles.

==== Aircraft ====
Delta Air Lines, one of the relay providers, was responsible for carrying the flame across the Atlantic Ocean from Athens, Greece, to the United States. A Boeing 777, known as the Soaring Spirit, decorated in Olympic-themed livery carried the Olympic flame in a ceremonial lantern from Greece to Atlanta, Georgia, during an 11-hour flight.

==== Railroad car ====
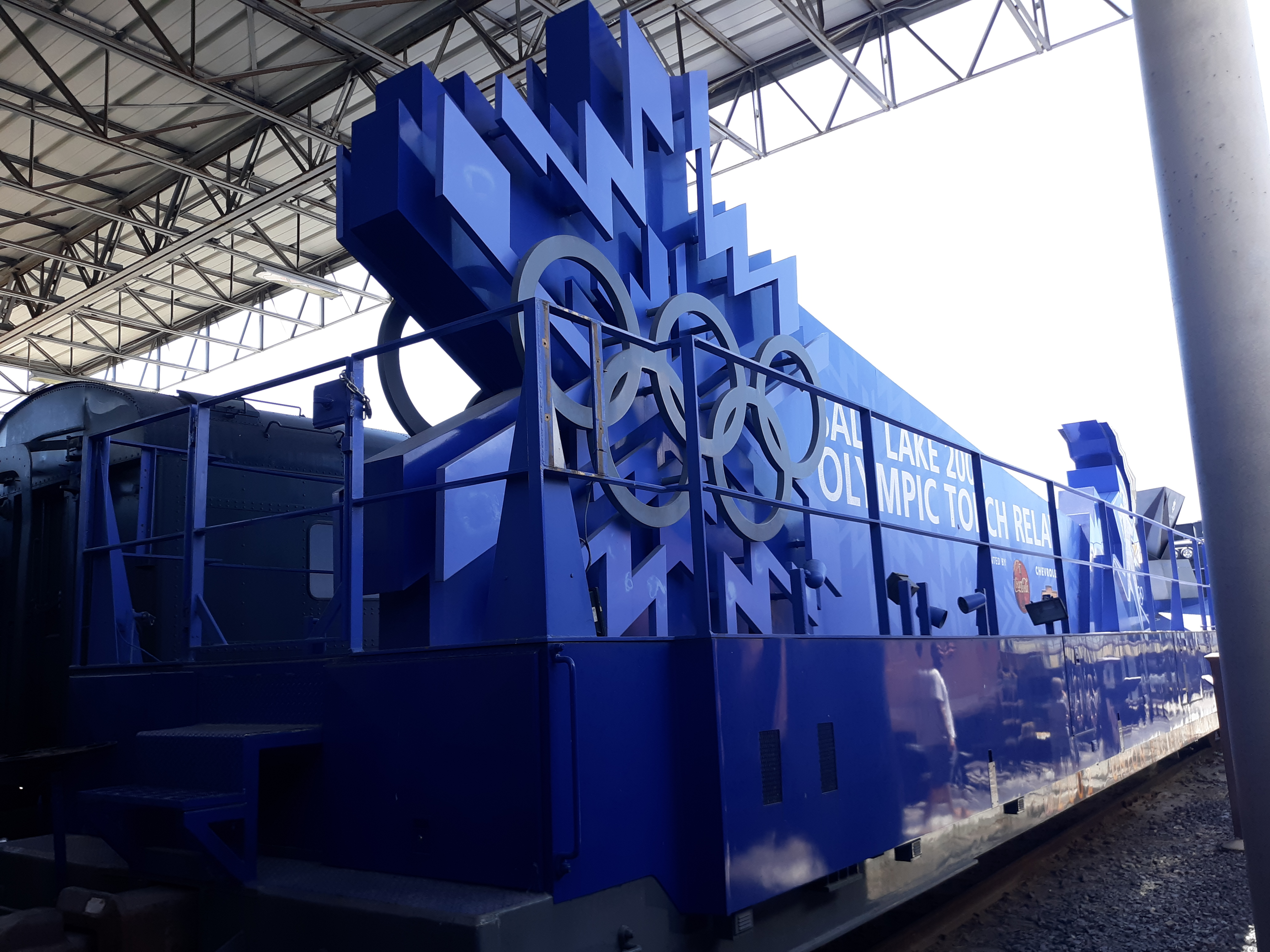
The specially designed flatcar that was used by Union Pacific to transport the Olympic Torch on display at Ogden, Utah

Union Pacific, another of the relay providers, used a specially designed railroad car to carry the flame across various areas of the United States (mainly rural and desert areas). Coined the "Cauldron Car", it was part of Union Pacific's "Olympic Train", which included two diesel locomotives (UP Numbers: 2001 & 2002), 13 passenger cars, and 3 service cars with the cauldron car serving as the caboose. The entire train was painted in Olympic livery, using Salt Lake's "Look of the Games" style, known as "Land of Contrast - Fire and Ice". The cauldron car contained a 2 million-BTU burner, to keep the flame burning, was originally used during the torch relay for the 1996 Summer Olympics, and was simply redesigned and repainted for the 2002 games. The Olympic train carried the flame on four separate occasions during the 2002 torch relay, for a total of more than 3,200 miles (5,100 km) through 11 states. Following the games the cauldron car was donated to the Utah State Railroad Museum at Union Station, where it is currently on display. In anticipation of the torch relay Overland Models (model railroading) created an H0 scale model of the Olympic Train, which included the two locomotives and several of the passenger cars.

The Heber Valley Historic Railroad also played a role in the torch relay. Its historic steam locomotives were joined by another from the Nevada Northern Railway Museum, and together they were known as the Olympic Steam Team. During the games all three locomotives would pull their own eight-car train loaded with spectators to the Soldier Hollow Olympic venue. The day prior to the Opening Ceremony of the games, all three locomotives were combined into one triple-headed train, and used to transport the Olympic flame from Soldier Hollow to Heber City, Utah, as part of the torch relay.

== Route ==
Route of the 2002 Winter Olympics torch relay through the United States. Red dots show the starting and ending points, orange dots represent major stops, while the blue arrows indicate the direction of travel along the route.

On November 19, 2001, the first 2002 Olympic torch was lit at the birthplace of the Olympic Games in Olympia, Greece. Greek actress Thalia Prokopiou played the role of high priestess and lit the torch using a flame kept in a clay urn. Usually the torch is lit using a parabolic mirror and the sun's rays, but for the third games in a row, cloudy conditions prevented that from happening during the ceremony. The weekend prior to the lighting ceremony, the flame held in the clay urn had been lit using the parabolic mirror and the sun's rays in case of this situation. Following the ceremony, a two-day Greek torch relay carried the flame to the Panathenian stadium in Athens, Greece, where it burned in a cauldron for two weeks.

On December 3, 2001, a Greek skier, Thanassis Tsailas, lit a 2002 Olympic torch from a flame in the cauldron, which in turn was used to light a ceremonial lantern. This lantern was then flown aboard the Soaring Spirit to Atlanta, Georgia, where it arrived on the morning of December 4. The lantern was unloaded and Bonnie Blair used its flame to light a temporary cauldron to be used at the celebration in Atlanta. During this celebration, Muhammad Ali lit a 2002 Olympic torch from the flame in the temporary cauldron, which he then passed to Olympians Peggy Fleming and Bob Paul, who began the 2002 Winter Olympics torch relay.

Some elements of the torch relay route were altered or canceled in the wake of the September 11 attacks. Special commemorations were held when the torch passed through Washington, D.C. and New York City, and several survivors, family members of victims, and first responders were given the opportunity to carry the torch. Additionally, the torch was planned to be carried by seaplane from Orlando to Fort Lauderdale, Florida, but this was canceled at the last minute because the seaplane operator was concerned about terrorism.

Date	Locations	Notable torchbearers and notes	Map
December 4	Atlanta, Georgia: Hartsfield International Airport; Centennial Olympic Park; Coca-Cola headquarters; Doraville: GM Doraville Assembly Plant; Athens: Classic Center; Clemson, South Carolina: Clemson Memorial Stadium; Greenville: Peace Center	Atlanta: Muhammad Ali; Peggy Fleming; Bob Paul; Bill Spencer; Nikki Stone; Bonnie Blair; Evander Holyfield; Dan O'Brien; Athens: Paula Zahn; Clemson: Woodrow Dantzler	2002 Winter Olympics torch relay is located in Georgia
December 5	Greenville Asheville, North Carolina: Biltmore Estate; Morganton Hickory Charlotte	Asheville: Kyle Petty; Charlotte: Michael Waltrip; Dale Earnhardt, Jr.; Teresa Earnhardt	2002 Winter Olympics torch relay is located in North Carolina
December 6	Charlotte Rock Hill, South Carolina: City Hall Plaza; Chester Columbia: South Carolina State House; Charleston	Columbia: Darius Rucker; Charleston: transported overnight to Jacksonville by Coast Guard Cutter Kingfisher	2002 Winter Olympics torch relay is located in South Carolina
December 7	Jacksonville, Florida: The Landing; St. Augustine Daytona Beach DeLand Winter Park Orlando: Lake Eola Park	Daytona Beach: Jeff Gordon; Orlando: Howie Dorough	2002 Winter Olympics torch relay is located in Florida
December 8	Orlando Fort Lauderdale Miami: Bayfront Park	Fort Lauderdale: Venus Williams; Serena Williams; Miami: Dan Marino	2002 Winter Olympics torch relay is located in Florida
December 9	Miami Mobile, Alabama Biloxi, Mississippi New Orleans, Louisiana: French Quarter; Baton Rouge		2002 Winter Olympics torch relay is located in Mississippi
December 10	Baton Rouge Lake Charles Beaumont, Texas Houston: Amtrak station; Rice University; George R. Brown Convention Center	Baton Rouge: boarded a Union Pacific train at Livonia; Houston: Mary Lou Retton; Tara Lipinski	2002 Winter Olympics torch relay is located in Louisiana
December 11	Houston San Antonio: River Walk; The Alamo; Austin: Texas State Capitol; Auditorium Shores	San Antonio: David Robinson; Austin: Lance Armstrong	2002 Winter Olympics torch relay is located in Texas
December 12	Austin Fort Worth: Intermodal Transportation Center; Texas Christian University; Livestock Exchange Building; Arlington: The Ballpark in Arlington; GM Arlington Assembly Plant; Dallas: Southern Methodist University; Fair Park; Dealey Plaza; City Hall Plaza	Fort Worth: carried on horseback in a cattle drive; Dallas: Troy Aikman	2002 Winter Olympics torch relay is located in Texas
December 13	Dallas Texarkana Arkadelphia, Arkansas Hot Springs Rockport Little Rock	Arkadelphia: Joby Ogwyn	2002 Winter Olympics torch relay is located in Arkansas
December 14	Little Rock Lonoke Carlisle Hazen Forrest City West Memphis Memphis, Tennessee: National Civil Rights Museum; Beale Street	Memphis: crossed the Mississippi River on a riverboat	2002 Winter Olympics torch relay is located in Arkansas
December 15	Memphis: St. Jude Children's Research Hospital; Jackson Dickson Nashville: Tennessee State University; Bicentennial Capitol Mall State Park; Vanderbilt University; Riverfront Park		2002 Winter Olympics torch relay is located in Tennessee
December 16	Nashville Madison Bowling Green, Kentucky: Fountain Square Park; National Corvette Museum; Elizabethtown Louisville: Churchill Downs; Louisville Zoo; Kentucky International Convention Center	Nashville: Mike Dunham; Louisville: Loretta Lynn	2002 Winter Olympics torch relay is located in Kentucky
December 17	Louisville: City Hall; The Galleria; Frankfort Lexington Hebron Cincinnati, Ohio: Paul Brown Stadium	Louisville: Diane Sawyer; Cincinnati: Kenyon Martin	2002 Winter Olympics torch relay is located in Kentucky
December 18	Covington, Kentucky: John A. Roebling Suspension Bridge; Cincinnati: Fairfax; Mariemont; Milford, Ohio Portsmouth Huntington, West Virginia Charleston		2002 Winter Olympics torch relay is located in Ohio
December 19	Charleston Morgantown Washington, Pennsylvania Pittsburgh: Heinz Field		2002 Winter Olympics torch relay is located in West Virginia
December 20	Pittsburgh Uniontown: Fort Necessity National Battlefield; Cumberland, Maryland Martinsburg, West Virginia	Pittsburgh: Mario Lemieux; Martinsburg: Ricky Rudd	2002 Winter Olympics torch relay is located in West Virginia
December 21	Martinsburg Alexandria, Virginia: The Pentagon; Washington, D.C.: Georgetown; Freedom Plaza; National Law Enforcement Officers Memorial; United States Capitol		2002 Winter Olympics torch relay is located in Maryland
December 22	Washington: The White House; Baltimore, Maryland: Rash Field; Wilmington, Delaware: Rodney Square; Philadelphia, Pennsylvania: Veterans Stadium; Marconi Plaza; Rittenhouse Square; Liberty Bell; City Hall; Philadelphia Museum of Art	Baltimore: Cal Ripken, Jr.; Philadelphia: Adam Taliaferro; Vai Sikahema; John F. Timoney	2002 Winter Olympics torch relay is located in Maryland
December 23	Philadelphia Hopewell Township, New Jersey: Washington Crossing Historic Park; Princeton: Drumthwacket; South Brunswick New York City: Goethals Bridge; Staten Island; Verrazzano–Narrows Bridge; Brooklyn; Grand Army Plaza; Queens; East River Ferry; Rockefeller Center	Washington Crossing: recreated George Washington's crossing of the Delaware River with the torch; Brooklyn: Christopher Reeve; Joe Torre; Lydia Stephans; Raymond Lumpp; New York Harbor: ferried past Statue of Liberty; Manhattan: Rudy Giuliani	2002 Winter Olympics torch relay is located in New Jersey
December 24–25	New York City: Rockefeller Center	rested in a special cauldron for Christmas	
December 26	New York City: Manhattan; The Bronx; New Haven, Connecticut Hartford: Bushnell Park; Providence, Rhode Island	New York City: Ann Curry	2002 Winter Olympics torch relay is located in USA Northeast
December 27	Providence: Rhode Island State Capitol; Fall River, Massachusetts New Bedford: City Hall; Plymouth: Plymouth Rock; Quincy: Quincy Center; Cambridge: Harvard Square; Somerville Boston: Bayside Expo Center	Quincy: Karen Cashman; Boston: Francis Bok; Eric Maleson	2002 Winter Olympics torch relay is located in Massachusetts
December 28	Boston: Charlestown; Everett York, Maine Kittery Portsmouth, New Hampshire Manchester Concord: New Hampshire State House; Hanover: Dartmouth College; Lebanon	Lebanon: carried down Storrs Hill ski jump	2002 Winter Olympics torch relay is located in New Hampshire
December 29	Lebanon White River Junction, Vermont Montpelier: Vermont State House; Burlington Lake Champlain: Grand Isle Ferry; Plattsburgh, New York Lake Placid: Verizon Sports Complex; MacKenzie Intervale Ski Jumping Complex; James B. Sheffield Olympic Skating Rink; Lake George: Fort William Henry Hotel	White River Junction: crossed Connecticut River on Abenaki canoe; Lake Placid: rode in bobsled; carried down 90-meter ski jump by Casey Colby	2002 Winter Olympics torch relay is located in Vermont
December 30	Lake George Saratoga Springs Albany Utica Syracuse	Syracuse: Stephen Baldwin	2002 Winter Olympics torch relay is located in New York
December 31	Syracuse Seneca Falls Rochester Amherst Tonawanda Buffalo: Theodore Roosevelt Inaugural National Historic Site	Rochester: Cathy Turner	2002 Winter Olympics torch relay is located in New York
January 1	Buffalo Erie, Pennsylvania Cleveland, Ohio: Rock and Roll Hall of Fame		2002 Winter Olympics torch relay is located in Pennsylvania
January 2	Cleveland Akron: Canal Park; Columbus: Ohio State University; COSI		2002 Winter Olympics torch relay is located in Ohio
January 3	Columbus Springfield Moraine: GM Moraine Assembly Plant; Dayton: Dayton Aviation Heritage National Historical Park; Lima Fort Wayne, Indiana		2002 Winter Olympics torch relay is located in Ohio
January 4	Fort Wayne South Bend: University of Notre Dame	University of Notre Dame: Theodore Hesburgh; Gary Chicago, Illinois: South Shore Cultural Center; Museum of Science and Industry; McCormick Place; Navy Pier	2002 Winter Olympics torch relay is located in Indiana
January 5	Oak Brook, Illinois Chicago Evanston Wilmette Kenilworth Winnetka Glencoe Highland Park: Ravinia Festival; Kenosha, Wisconsin Racine Shorewood Milwaukee West Milwaukee West Allis Milwaukee: Pettit National Ice Center	Highland Park: Ramsey Lewis; Milwaukee: Bonnie Blair	2002 Winter Olympics torch relay is located in Chicago metropolitan area 2002 Winter Olympics torch relay is located in Wisconsin
January 6	Milwaukee Lansing, Michigan: Capital City Airport; Michigan State Capitol; Flint Royal Oak Warren Detroit: Comerica Park	Milwaukee: flown across Lake Michigan; Lansing: Tom Izzo; Warren: Gordie Howe; Detroit: Aretha Franklin	2002 Winter Olympics torch relay is located in Michigan
January 7	Garden City Livonia Detroit: Renaissance Center; Ann Arbor: Michigan Stadium; Indianapolis, Indiana: Broad Ripple Park; Monument Circle	Ann Arbor: Dave Brandon; Indianapolis: Kim Seybold; Wayne Seybold	2002 Winter Olympics torch relay is located in Michigan
January 8	Indianapolis Speedway: Indianapolis Motor Speedway; Terre Haute East St. Louis, Illinois: Jackie Joyner-Kersee Center; St. Louis, Missouri: Gateway Arch; Forest Park; Saint Louis Science Center; Kiener Plaza	Speedway: driven around the track by Sam Hornish Jr. and Hélio Castroneves; Tony George; Eddie Cheever; John Andretti; St. Louis: Jackie Joyner-Kersee; Ozzie Smith; Kurt Warner	2002 Winter Olympics torch relay is located in USA Midsouth
January 9	St. Louis: Francis Field, Washington University; Wentzville: GM Wentzville Assembly Plant; Columbia: Hearnes Center; Kansas City: Negro Leagues Baseball Museum; Country Club Plaza		2002 Winter Olympics torch relay is located in Missouri
January 10	Kansas City St. Joseph: Pony Express Museum; Nebraska City, Nebraska: Arbor Lodge State Park; Council Bluffs, Iowa Omaha, Nebraska: Joslyn Art Museum; Creighton University; Old Market; Durham Western Heritage Museum	Omaha: boarded Union Pacific train for overnight transport to Kansas	2002 Winter Olympics torch relay is located in USA Midwest
January 11	Topeka, Kansas Wichita Oklahoma City, Oklahoma: Bricktown Events Center; Oklahoma City National Memorial; Oklahoma City University; Oklahoma State Capitol; National Cowboy & Western Heritage Museum	Oklahoma City: Nadia Comăneci; Bart Conner; continued on Union Pacific train for overnight transport to Texas and New Mexico	2002 Winter Olympics torch relay is located in Kansas 2002 Winter Olympics torch relay is located in Oklahoma
January 12	Amarillo, Texas Santa Rosa, New Mexico Vaughn Santa Fe Albuquerque: Balloon Fiesta Park; Civic Plaza; Amtrak station; Belen	Vaughn: disembarked from train for motorcade to Santa Fe; Albuquerque: boarded Union Pacific train for overnight transport to Texas and Arizona	2002 Winter Olympics torch relay is located in New Mexico
January 13	El Paso, Texas Tucson, Arizona Chandler Tempe Scottsdale: Scottsdale Mall; Phoenix: Patriots Square Park	Tucson: Kerri Strug; Phoenix: Curt Schilling	2002 Winter Olympics torch relay is located in Arizona
January 14	Yuma Jacumba Hot Springs, California Chula Vista: United States Olympic Training Center; Coronado San Diego: Balboa Park; Embarcadero Marina Park	Chula Vista: rowed across San Diego Bay by Cliff Meidl; San Diego: Sally Ride; Lance Armstrong	2002 Winter Olympics torch relay is located in southern California
January 15	San Diego San Juan Capistrano Laguna Beach Newport Beach Costa Mesa Los Angeles: Los Angeles Memorial Coliseum; La Brea Tar Pits; Universal CityWalk	Costa Mesa: Lance Bass; Los Angeles: Goldie Hawn; Debbie Heald; Magic Johnson; Rafer Johnson; Larry King; Michelle Kwan; Carl Lewis; Kevin Richardson; Arnold Schwarzenegger; Martin Sheen	2002 Winter Olympics torch relay is located in southern California
January 16	Los Angeles Pasadena: Norton Simon Museum; Oxnard Ventura Santa Barbara Buellton Solvang Santa Ynez Santa Maria Guadalupe San Luis Obispo	Pasadena: Erin Brockovich; Chris O'Donnell	2002 Winter Olympics torch relay is located in southern California
January 17	San Luis Obispo Paso Robles King City Soledad Salinas: National Steinbeck Center; Carmel-by-the-Sea Pacific Grove Monterey: Monterey Bay Aquarium; Cannery Row; Seaside		2002 Winter Olympics torch relay is located in California 2002 Winter Olympics torch relay is located in Monterey Peninsula
January 18	Marina Santa Cruz San Jose Oakland: Jack London Square; San Francisco: Hyde Street Pier; Lombard Street; Justin Herman Plaza	Oakland: carried across San Francisco Bay on the schooner Alma; San Francisco: Pat O'Brien; Barry Bonds	2002 Winter Olympics torch relay is located in Northern California
January 19	San Francisco: Golden Gate Bridge; Mill Valley Martinez Concord Walnut Grove Sacramento: California State Capitol	San Francisco: Willie Mays; Concord: Mike Love	2002 Winter Olympics torch relay is located in Northern California
January 20	Sacramento Truckee Olympic Valley Tahoe City Tahoe Vista Kings Beach Incline Village, Nevada South Lake Tahoe, California	Olympic Valley: rode up in cable car, then skied down mountain by Mark Wellman	2002 Winter Olympics torch relay is located in Northern California
January 21	South Lake Tahoe Stateline, Nevada: Caesars Tahoe; Genoa Carson City: Nevada State Railroad Museum; Nevada State Capitol; Reno: Reno Arch; Sparks Truckee, California Roseville, California	Reno: Mills Lane; Patty Sheehan; Sparks: boarded Union Pacific train to Klamath Falls	2002 Winter Olympics torch relay is located in Northern California
January 22	Klamath Falls, Oregon Eugene Salem: Willamette University; Oregon State Capitol; Tigard Portland		2002 Winter Olympics torch relay is located in Oregon
January 23	Portland Vancouver, Washington Longview Kelso Tumwater Olympia: Washington State Capitol; Lacey Tacoma Des Moines Seattle: Safeco Field; Seattle Center	Olympia: Bill Johnson; Tacoma: carried by tugboat across Puget Sound to Des Moines; Seattle: Jeff Nelson; Megan Quann	2002 Winter Olympics torch relay is located in Washington (state)
January 24	Seattle Juneau, Alaska: Mendenhall Glacier; Spokane, Washington: Spokane International Airport; Spokane Arena	Juneau: flown to and from Alaska by SkyWest Airlines; rowed across Gastineau Channel in a traditional Tlingit canoe; student protest at Juneau-Douglas High School was the subject of Supreme Court case Morse v. Frederick	2002 Winter Olympics torch relay is located in Alaska
January 25	Pasco, Washington Kennewick Baker City, Oregon Caldwell, Idaho Nampa Boise	Pasco: crossed Columbia River on a Coast Guard Cutter	2002 Winter Olympics torch relay is located in Washington (state) 2002 Winter Olympics torch relay is located in Idaho
January 26	Boise Mountain Home Twin Falls Fort Hall Indian Reservation Pocatello Idaho Falls		2002 Winter Olympics torch relay is located in Idaho
January 27	Idaho Falls Rexburg West Yellowstone, Montana Yellowstone National Park: Old Faithful; West Yellowstone Big Sky Bozeman		2002 Winter Olympics torch relay is located in Montana
January 28	Bozeman Livingston Big Timber Columbus Laurel Billings		2002 Winter Olympics torch relay is located in Montana
January 29	Sheridan, Wyoming Kaycee Casper Wheatland Cheyenne		2002 Winter Olympics torch relay is located in Wyoming
January 30	Cheyenne Fort Collins, Colorado Loveland Berthoud Longmont Boulder Denver	Longmont: Erik Weihenmayer; Boulder: Davis Phinney; Denver: John Elway	2002 Winter Olympics torch relay is located in Colorado
January 31	Denver Littleton: Columbine High School; Colorado Springs	Littleton: Columbine survivors Patrick Ireland, Richard Castaldo, the father of victim John Tomlin, and principal Frank DeAngelis.	2002 Winter Olympics torch relay is located in Colorado
February 1	Colorado Springs: Garden of the Gods; Johnson Village Buena Vista Leadville Vail Eagle	Vail: Cindy Nelson	2002 Winter Olympics torch relay is located in Colorado
February 2	Eagle Glenwood Springs Carbondale Aspen Rifle Grand Junction	Rifle: James (Jim) Boone	2002 Winter Olympics torch relay is located in Colorado
February 3	set aside as a contingency day in case of weather delays along the route, no relay celebrations due to the Super Bowl		
February 4	Arches National Park, Utah: carried under Delicate Arch; Moab Monument Valley Bryce Canyon Zion National Park Springdale Hurricane St. George		2002 Winter Olympics torch relay is located in Utah
February 5	St. George, Utah Cedar City Parowan Beaver Richfield Centerfield Gunnison Manti Ephraim Nephi Provo		2002 Winter Olympics torch relay is located in Utah
February 6	Provo Orem American Fork Lehi Camp Floyd State Park Tooele Antelope Island State Park Layton Tremonton Garland Logan Brigham City Ogden	Ogden: Spencer Eccles	2002 Winter Olympics torch relay is located in Utah
February 7	Ogden Henefer Midway Heber City Park City Salt Lake City: This Is the Place Heritage Park; Utah State Capitol; Church Administration Building; Abravanel Hall; Salt Lake City and County Building	Heber City: Hilary Lindh; Salt Lake City: carried into Salt Lake Valley by "Brigham Young" (portrayed by actor James Arrington) on stagecoach; Robert D. Hales; Gordon B. Hinckley; James E. Faust; Neal A. Maxwell; Thomas S. Monson; Prince Albert of Monaco; Chris Waddell; Kristi Yamaguchi	2002 Winter Olympics torch relay is located in Utah
February 8	Salt Lake City area: Woods Cross; Bountiful; West Valley City; Taylorsville; Kearns; Utah Olympic Oval; West Jordan; Draper; Sandy; Midvale; Murray; Rice-Eccles Stadium (opening ceremony)	Sandy: Karl Malone; Kearns: Steve Young	2002 Winter Olympics torch relay is located in Utah

== Gallery ==
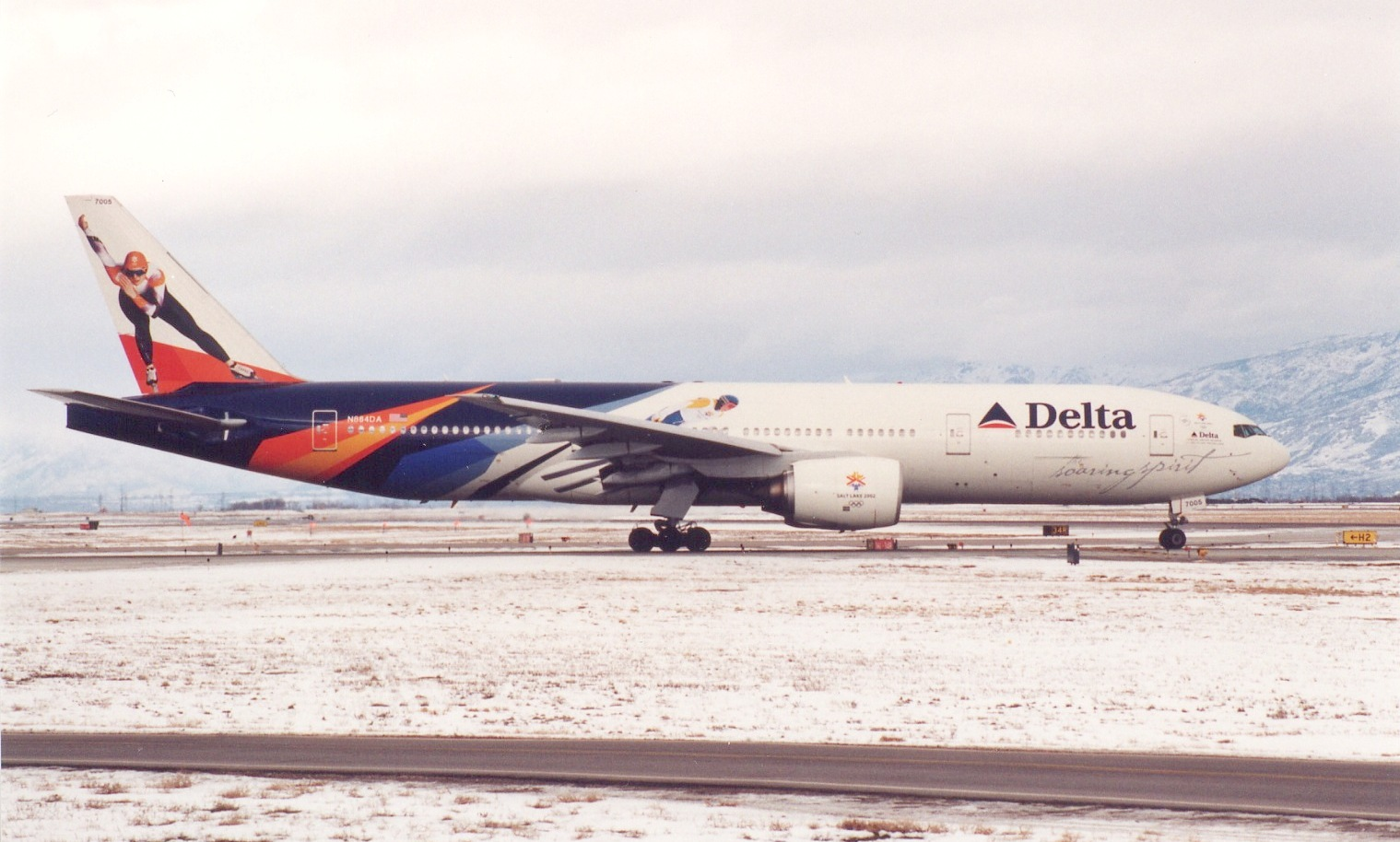
Delta's Soaring Spirit was used to transport the flame from Greece to the United States.

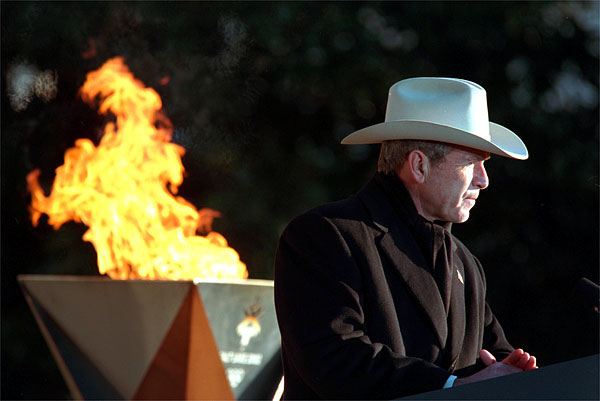
President George W. Bush, with the flame behind, speaks at the White House.

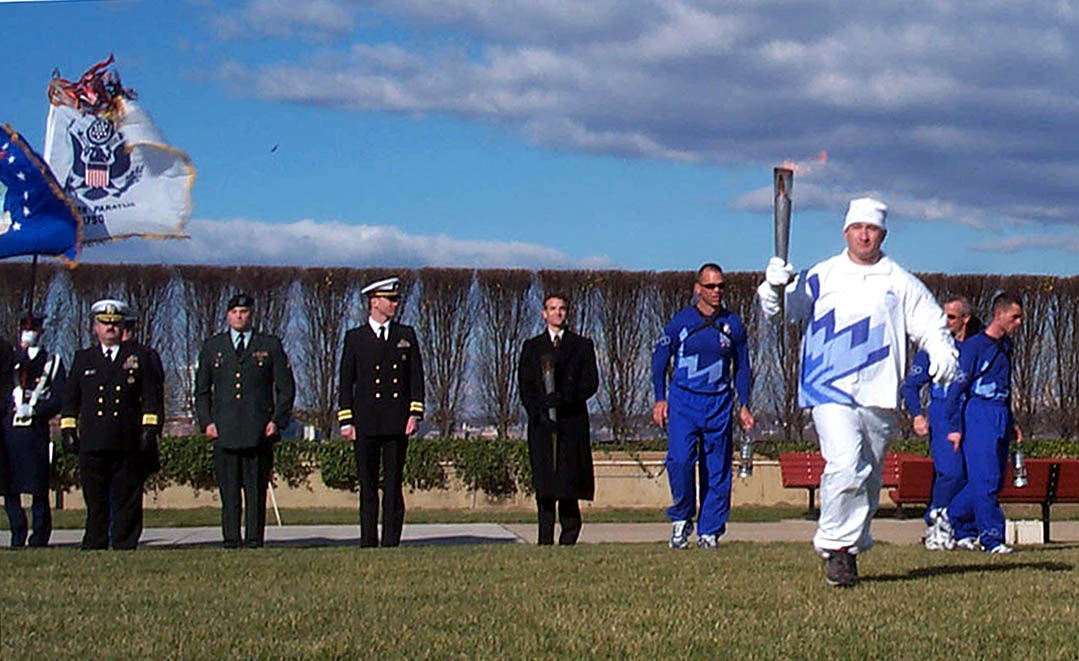
The flame during a ceremony at The Pentagon.

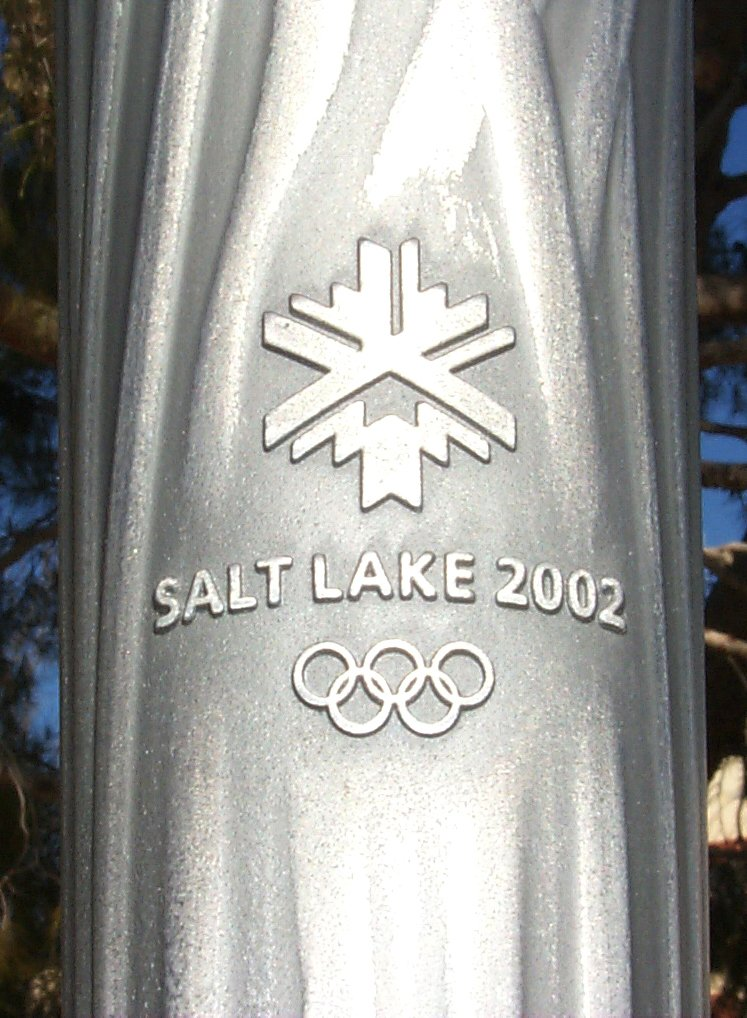
Close-up of the 2002 Winter Olympic torch

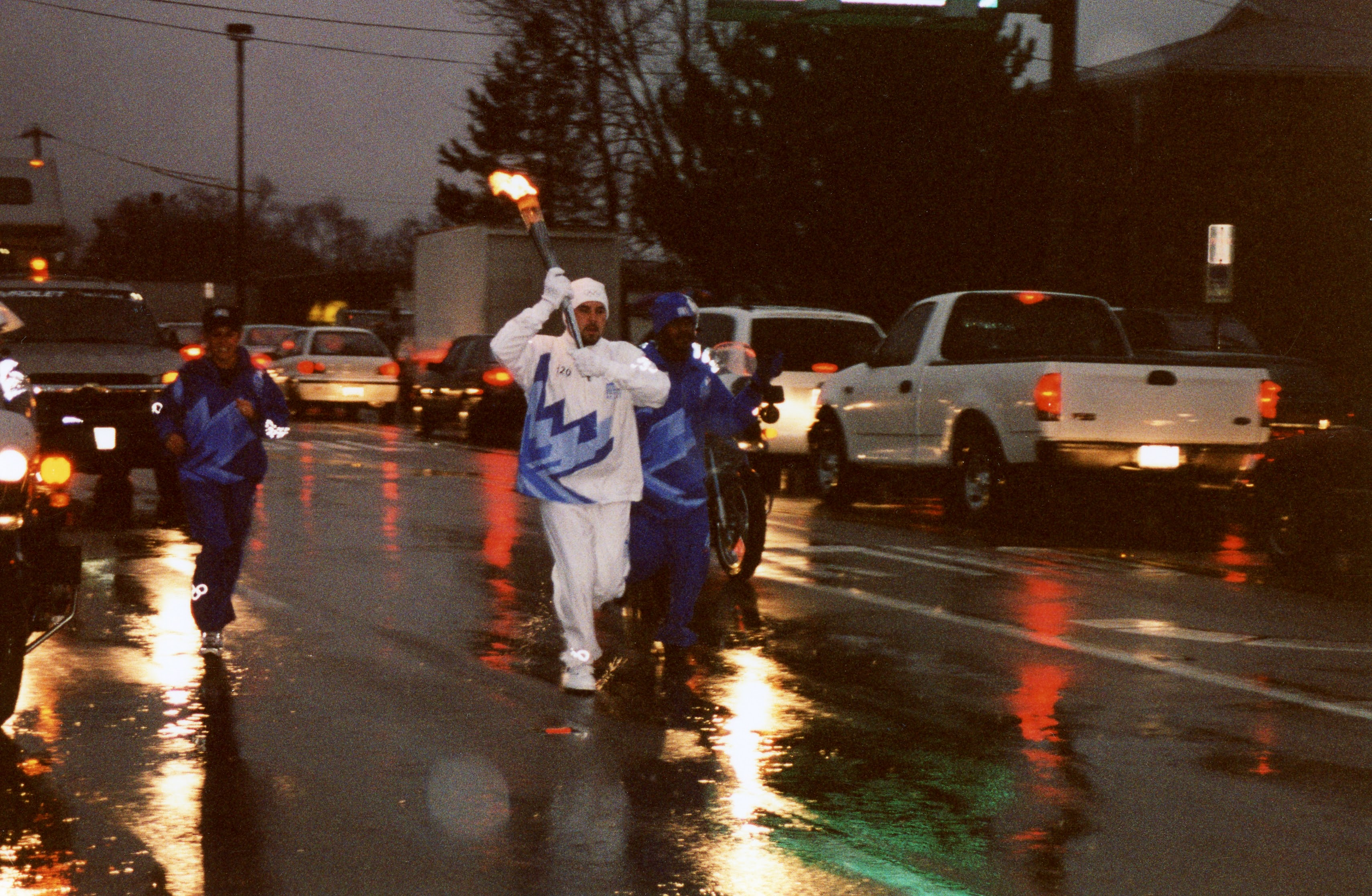
The flame passes through North College Hill, Ohio.

== See also ==
- Morse v. Frederick (2007)
