= Substantial disruption =

Criterion set forth by the United States Supreme Court

The substantial disruption test is a criterion set forth by the United States Supreme Court, in the leading case of Tinker v. Des Moines Independent Community School District, 393 U.S. 503 (1969). The test is used to determine whether an act by a U.S. public school official (State actor) has abridged a student's constitutionally protected First Amendment rights of free speech.

The test, as set forth in the Tinker opinion, asks the question: Did the speech or expression of the student "materially and substantially interfere with the requirements of appropriate discipline in the operation of the school," or might it "reasonably have led school authorities to forecast substantial disruption of or material interference with school activities?" The case holds that to justify suppression of speech, school officials would need to show that the conduct in question would "materially and substantially interfere" with the operation of the school.
