= Dean v. Utica Community Schools =

2004 United States legal case

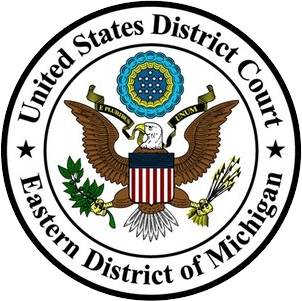
- Court: United States District Court for the Eastern District of Michigan
- Full case name: Dean v. Utica Community Schools
- Decided: November 17, 2004
- Docket nos.: 2:03-cv-71367
- Citation: 345 F. Supp. 2d 799

Court membership
- Judge sitting: Arthur Tarnow

Dean v. Utica Community Schools, 345 F. Supp. 2d 799 (E.D. Mich. 2004), is a landmark legal case in United States constitutional law, namely on how the First Amendment applies to censorship in a public school environment. The case expanded on the ruling definitions of the Supreme Court case Hazelwood School District v. Kuhlmeier, in which a high school journalism-oriented trial on censorship limited the First Amendment right to freedom of expression in curricular student newspapers. The case consisted of Utica High School Principal Richard Machesky ordering the deletion of an article in the Arrow, the high school's newspaper, a decision later deemed "unreasonable" and "unconstitutional" by District Judge Arthur Tarnow.

== Case overview ==
On March 8, 2002, Utica High School Principal Richard Machesky asked the Arrow advisor to cut student reporter Katy Dean's story about school bus diesel emissions along with the adjoining cartoon and editorial, at the time claiming it was based on "unreliable" sources and was "highly inaccurate." After a year of asking school officials to reconsider their decision, Dean filed a lawsuit against the Utica Community Schools in federal court.

On October 12, 2004, Judge Arthur Tarnow determined that "The Arrow" student newspaper was an example of a limited public forum after reviewing the degree of control school officials exercised over the paper, which ultimately separated this case from the decision expressed in Hazelwood. A limited public forum—in this context, a public forum created for use by student editors—can reasonably be regulated in terms of time, place, and manner of expression, but not on the substance of that expression.

Tarnow also examined Dean's article and determined that there was not a "significant disparity in quality between Dean's article in the Arrow and the similar articles in 'professional newspapers.'" In addition to these two factors, the Judge decided that the school had censored the article in its own interest, by preventing the expression of its viewpoint, and then claiming it was "inaccurate."

== See also ==
- Environmental journalism
- Tinker v. Des Moines
- Bethel v. Fraser
- Hazelwood School District v. Kuhlmeier
