= Hazelwood School District v. Kuhlmeier =

1988 US Supreme Court case

- Supreme Court of the United States

Argued October 13, 1987 Decided January 13, 1988
- Full case name: Hazelwood School District, et al. v. Kuhlmeier, et al.
- Docket no.: 86-836
- Citations: 484 U.S. 260 (more) 108 S. Ct. 562; 98 L. Ed. 2d 592; 1985 U.S. LEXIS 310; 56 U.S.L.W. 4079; 14 Media L. Rep. 2081
- Argument: Oral argument
- Opinion announcement: Opinion announcement

Case history
- Prior: Kuhlmeier v. Hazelwood Sch. Dist., 596 F. Supp. 1422 (E.D. Mo. 1984); 607 F. Supp. 1450 (E.D. Mo. 1985); reversed, 795 F.2d 1368 (8th Cir. 1986); cert. granted, 479 U.S. 1053 (1987).

Court membership
- Chief Justice William Rehnquist Associate Justices William J. Brennan Jr. · Byron White; Thurgood Marshall · Harry Blackmun; John P. Stevens · Sandra Day O'Connor; Antonin Scalia

Case opinions
- Majority: White, joined by Rehnquist, Stevens, O'Connor, Scalia
- Dissent: Brennan, joined by Marshall, Blackmun

Laws applied
- U.S. Const. amend. I

Hazelwood School District et al. v. Kuhlmeier et al., 484 U.S. 260 (1988), is a landmark decision by the Supreme Court of the United States which held, in a 5–3 decision, that student speech in a school-sponsored student newspaper at a public high school could be censored by school officials without a violation of First Amendment rights if the school's actions were "reasonably related" to a legitimate pedagogical concern.

The case concerned the censorship of two articles in The Spectrum, the student newspaper of Hazelwood East High School in St. Louis County, Missouri, in 1983. When the school principal removed an article concerning divorce and another concerning teen pregnancy, the student journalists sued, claiming that their First Amendment rights had been violated. A lower court sided with the school, but its decision was overturned by the U.S. Court of Appeals for the Eighth Circuit, which sided with the students and found that the paper was a "public forum" comparable to speech outside an educational setting. The Supreme Court reversed, noting that the paper was established by school officials as a limited forum for the purpose of a supervised journalism class, and could be censored even though similar speech in an off-campus or independent student newspaper would be protected.

The case, and the earlier Tinker v. Des Moines Independent Community School District (1969), are considered landmark decisions for defining the right of expression for students in public schools. While subsequent court rulings have varied on when Kuhlmeier applies, the case remains a strong precedent in the regulation of student speech. However, the state statutes protecting student free expression, enacted by 17 states as of March 23, 2023, most in response to the limitations of Kuhlmeier, typically adopt the more protective Tinker precedent.

== Background ==
=== Facts of the case ===
The case concerned The Spectrum, a student newspaper published as part of a Journalism II class at Hazelwood East High School in St. Louis County, Missouri. The Spectrum was published roughly every three weeks during the 1982–1983 school year. About 4,500 copies were distributed to students and community members. The cost of printing the paper, as well as supplies, textbooks, and a portion of the academic advisor's salary, were furnished by the district's board of education, supplemented by newspaper sales. For that school year, the board supplied $4,668 in printing costs, and Howard Emerson, the adviser to the journalism class, submitted page proofs of the May 13 issue of the newspaper to principal Robert Eugene Reynolds for approval, a practice that was customary at the time. Reynolds objected to two of the stories scheduled to run. One was about teen pregnancy, containing interviews with three students who had been pregnant. The story used false names to keep the girls' identities a secret, but Reynolds was concerned that the students would still be identifiable from the text. He was also concerned that the references to sexual activity and birth control were inappropriate for younger students at the school. The second story was about divorce and featured an interview with a student whose parents were divorced, in which she complained that her father "wasn't spending enough time with my mom, my sister, and I ... was always out of town on business or out late playing cards with the guys ... always argued about everything". Reynolds, unaware that the girl's name would also be changed, argued that her family should have been given an opportunity to respond within the story or to object to its publication.

Reynolds did not believe there was time to make changes because, if there were any delays in publication, the newspaper would not be published before the end of the school year. After consulting with his supervisors, he opted to publish a four-page newspaper instead of a six-page one, omitting the pages containing the two stories in question. Cutting two pages removed a total of seven articles from the paper. Reynolds did not tell the students about the decision, and they did not find out about it until the paper was delivered to the school.

In response, editor Cathy Kuhlmeier and reporters Leslie Smart and Leanne Tippett filed suit in January 1984 with the aid of the American Civil Liberties Union. Kuhlmeier later said that the idea for the pieces had come from old issues of The Spectrum and that she had been looking to update them.

=== Legal precedent ===
Until the 1960s, administrative review of student publications was considered routine at both the high school and collegiate level. However, with the rise of the counterculture of the 1960s, student publications began to explore social issues with greater fervor, focusing on the Vietnam War, the civil rights movement, sexual orientation, and other topics considered controversial at the time.

In 1969, the U.S. Supreme Court held in Tinker v. Des Moines Independent Community School District (393 U.S. 503) that students' freedom of expression is protected under the First Amendment. Following that precedent, at least 125 cases in lower courts across the country were decided in favor of student expression and against administrative censorship. Whenever an instance of censorship involved action by a government employee, such as a school principal or a college dean, the courts held that First Amendment safeguards applied. Under the Tinker precedent, courts recognized student newspapers as public forums in which expression could be restricted only if administrators could prove that substantial disruption of school activities was imminent. Two subsequent cases—Healy v. James, 408 U.S. 169 (1972), and Papish v. University of Missouri Curators, 410 U.S. 670 (1973)—expanded the First Amendment rights of students on college campuses, but did not strongly define the status of student newspapers as public forums.

By the 1980s, however, with the end of the student protest era, school administrators sought to reassert their authority. The first case in the new trend, Bethel School District v. Fraser, 478 U.S. 675 (1986), involved a high school student who was disciplined for delivering a speech containing sexual innuendos, even though they were not obscene or disruptive in a legal sense. Overturning lower court rulings, the Supreme Court held that the Tinker precedent did not apply because the penalties imposed by the school were unrelated to the student's political viewpoint.

=== Lower court decisions ===
The Kuhlmeier case was filed in the U.S. District Court for the Eastern District of Missouri. The students sought a declaration that their First Amendment and Fourteenth Amendment rights had been violated by undue actions of a public official, as well as injunctive relief and monetary damages. After a bench trial, the district court denied the injunction and monetary damages. In May 1985, it ruled that no violation of First Amendment rights had occurred, and held that school officials may restrict student speech in activities that "are an integral part of the school's educational function" as long as the restriction has "a substantial and reasonable basis".

The U.S. Court of Appeals for the Eighth Circuit reversed the district court's decision in January 1986. It held that The Spectrum was not only part of the school program, but also a public forum. The newspaper was "intended to be and operated as a conduit for student viewpoint", the appeals court found, and as a public forum, it could not be censored unless "necessary to avoid material and substantial interference with school work or discipline ... or the rights of others ".

== Supreme Court ruling ==
The Supreme Court granted certiorari in January 1987, and the case was argued on October 13, 1987. On January 13, 1988, the court handed down its decision, overturning the circuit court in a 5-3 ruling. Its majority opinion set a precedent that school-sponsored activities, including student newspapers and drama productions, are not normally protected from administrative censorship under the First Amendment.

=== Majority opinion ===
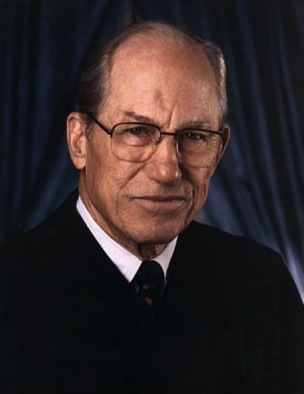
Associate Justice Byron White wrote the court's majority opinion.

The majority of the justices held that the school principal was entitled to censor the articles. The majority opinion, written by Associate Justice Byron White, stated that officials had never intended the school paper to be a public forum, as underground publications were in past cases. White went on to say that educators do not infringe on First Amendment rights when exercising control over student speech in school-sponsored activities, "so long as their actions are reasonably related to legitimate pedagogical concerns". The court established that the student publication could be regulated by school officials, and that they "reserved the forum for its intended purpose, as a supervised learning experience for journalism students".

A school need not tolerate student speech that is inconsistent with its basic educational mission, even though the government could not . ... (Judicial action to protect students' rights is justified) only when the decision to censor a school-sponsored publication, theatrical production or other vehicle of student expression has no valid educational purpose.

The decision overrode the precedent set in the Tinker case, which had permitted censorship of student speech only if it violated the rights of other students or threatened to cause a campus disruption. The majority opinion in Kuhlmeier held that this case was different. The majority opinion said that school administrators are not required to tolerate speech that is contrary to the school's academic mission, and continued:

The question [of] whether the First Amendment requires a school to tolerate particular student speech—the question we addressed in Tinker—is different from the question whether the First Amendment requires a school affirmatively to promote particular student speech. The former question addresses educators' ability to silence students' personal expression that happens to occur on the school premises. The latter question concerns educators' authority over school sponsored publications, theatrical productions, and other expressive activities that students, parents, and members of the public might reasonably perceive to bear the imprimatur of the school.

In a footnote, the court clarified that the ruling did not necessarily apply at the collegiate level.

=== Dissenting opinion ===
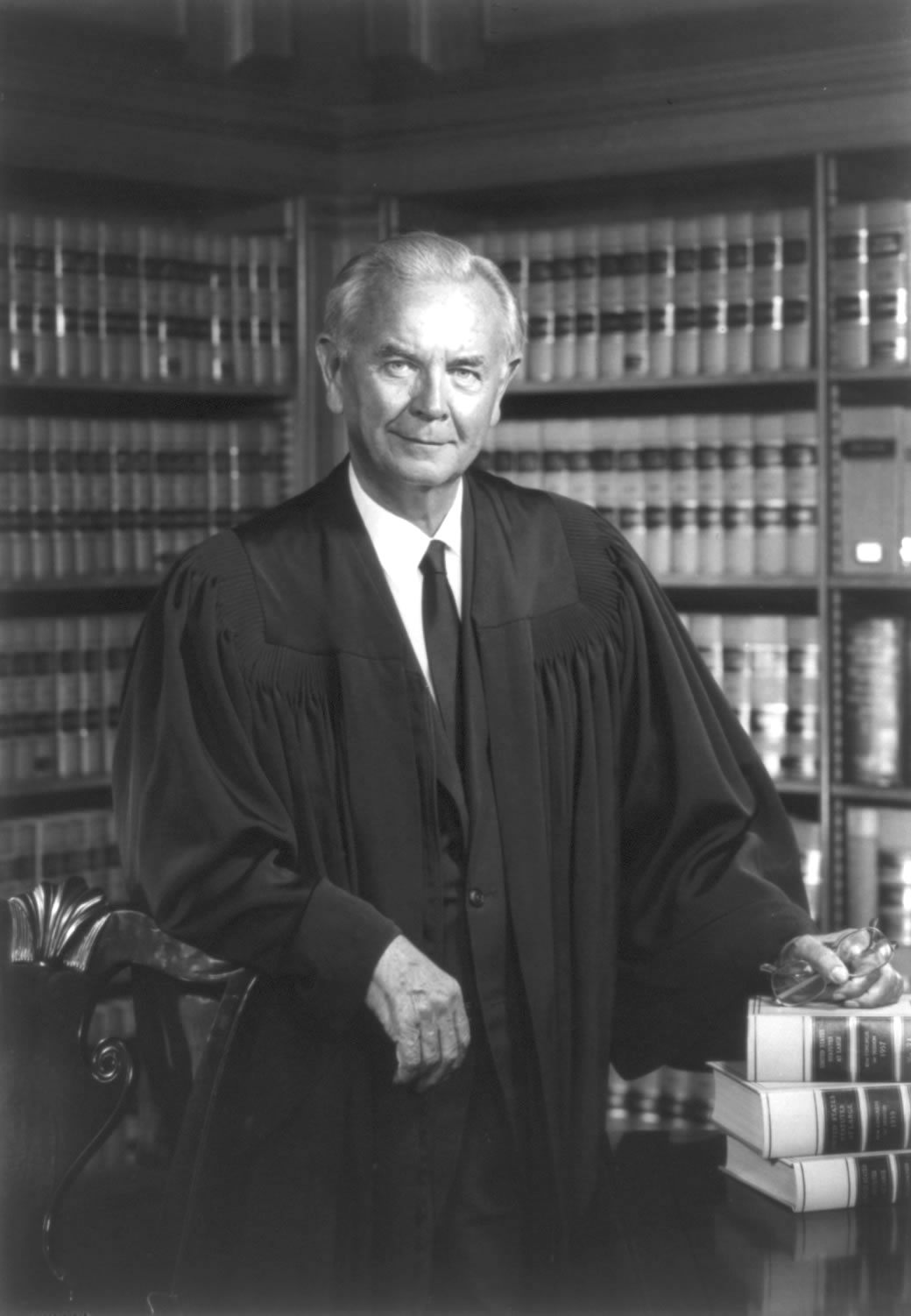
Associate Justice William J. Brennan Jr. wrote the dissenting opinion.

Associate Justice William J. Brennan Jr. wrote a dissenting opinion, in which he was joined by Associate Justices Thurgood Marshall and Harry Blackmun, who often took liberal positions on First Amendment issues. In his opinion, Brennan expressed concern about the message the majority ruling would send to students, writing:

The young men and women of Hazelwood East expected a civics lesson, but not the one the Court teaches them today ... Such unthinking contempt for individual rights is intolerable from any state official. It is particularly insidious from (a school principal) to whom the public entrusts the task of inculcating in its youth an appreciation for the cherished democratic liberties that our constitution guarantees.

== Legacy ==
The case established the standard that school personnel must meet to limit students' freedom of expression in secondary schools. As representatives of the state, school administrators can censor, restrain, or refuse to publish school-sponsored student expression if it interferes with the requirements of school discipline, interferes with students' rights, interferes with academic propriety, generates health or welfare concerns, or is deemed obscene or vulgar. This extends to theatrical productions, public speeches in an assembly environment, and publications produced as part of curricular activity, such as a student newspaper. The Supreme Court majority termed these reasons "legitimate pedagogical concerns".

This standard does not, however, apply to personal or non-school-sponsored communication, such as off-campus publications, unless that communication interferes with school discipline or the rights of others. The Kuhlmeier case established student newspapers as "limited public forums". This means schools may exercise prior restraint regarding the "style and content" of a student newspaper so long as their action is "not unreasonable", whereas there previously had to be compelling evidence to warrant censorship. Separate cases also established what constituted school activities, such as in-class parties and art created by students at the behest of teachers.

In response to the ruling, some students created web-based publications not subsidized by the school. Some individual states have also responded with laws designating student newspapers as public forums and offering them greater First Amendment protection. Experts from the Student Press Law Center say the case has meant that fewer lawsuits regarding student censorship make it to court.

In conjunction with the 25th anniversary of the Court's decision in 2013, the Student Press Law Center launched a nationwide censorship awareness campaign, "Cure Hazelwood," that ignited "New Voices" reform movements across the country, seeking to enact state legislation affording students enhanced press freedoms.

=== Subsequent jurisprudence ===
Federal appeals courts have been divided on whether the Kuhlmeier case applies to college newspapers, a question the Supreme Court left open. Courts have also been split on viewpoint-based expression in schools, such as religious expression.

A 1989 case, Alabama Student Party v. Student Government Assn. (867 F.2d 1344), held that campus newspapers that are part of a curriculum might not enjoy First Amendment protection. In 2001, the U.S. Court of Appeals for the Sixth Circuit ruled in Kincaid v. Gibson (236 F. 3d 342) that Kuhlmeier did not apply at the college level, and that a student publication could not be censored if the censorship was not viewpoint-neutral. Subsequently, Dean v. Utica dealt with what defines a "legitimate pedagogical concern", and the court found that a school had censored speech wantonly.

A 2005 U.S. Court of Appeals for the Seventh Circuit decision, Hosty v. Carter (412 U.S. 731), however, held that Kuhlmeier did apply to subsidized student media at the college level. That ruling, though controversial, found that there was "no sharp difference between high school and college newspapers", noting that some college newspapers are financially subsidized or produced by journalism classes. The 2007 decision Morse v. Frederick (551 U.S. 393) found that the First Amendment did not protect student speech that could be "reasonably viewed as promoting drug use".

== See also ==
- Desilets v. Clearview Regional Board of Education, 647 A.2d. 150 (N.J. 1994)
- Tinker v. Des Moines Independent Community School District
- Hazelwood School District v. United States
- Censorship of student media in the United States
- List of United States Supreme Court cases, volume 484
- Student Press Law Center
