= Papish v. Board of Curators of University of Missouri =

- Supreme Court of the United States

Decided 19 March, 1973
- Full case name: Papish v. Board of Curators of University of Missouri
- Citations: 410 U.S. 667 (more)

Holding
- Reaffirmed that public universities could not punish students for indecent or offensive speech that did not disrupt campus order or interfere with the rights of others.

Court membership
- Chief Justice Warren E. Burger Associate Justices William O. Douglas · William J. Brennan Jr. Potter Stewart · Byron White; Thurgood Marshall · Harry Blackmun; Lewis F. Powell Jr. · William Rehnquist

Case opinions
- Majority: Douglas, joined by Brennan, Stewart, White, Marshall, Powell
- Dissent: Rehnquist, joined by Burger, Blackmun

Papish v. Board of Curators of University of Missouri is a court case that was heard and decided by the U.S. Supreme Court on March 19, 1973.

In 1969, Barbara Susan Papish, a graduate student at the University of Missouri, distributed a newspaper containing a political cartoon of policemen raping the Statue of Liberty and the Goddess of Justice with the caption "With Liberty and Justice for All." She and three of her classmates were arrested for "possessing and attempting to sell obscene literature". The university tried to expel Papish for violating their student conduct code that prohibited "indecent conduct or speech" and the lower courts agreed. In 1973, the Supreme Court overturned the lower ruling, rejecting the notion that such content-based discipline could be justified, and ruled that public universities could not punish students for offensive speech that did not cause disruption or interfere with the rights of others. The Court held that the school's expulsion of Papish violated the First Amendment.
