= Morse v. Frederick =

2007 U.S. Supreme Court case on student speech

Coordinates: 58.3057°N 134.4291°W

- Supreme Court of the United States

Argued March 19, 2007 Decided June 25, 2007
- Full case name: Deborah Morse and the Juneau School Board, et al., Petitioners v. Joseph Frederick
- Docket no.: 06-278
- Citations: 551 U.S. 393 (more) 127 S. Ct. 2618; 168 L. Ed. 2d 290; 2007 U.S. LEXIS 8514; 75 U.S.L.W. 4487; 20 Fla. L. Weekly Fed. S 431; 220 Ed. Law Rep. 50; 07 Cal. Daily Op. Serv. 7248; 2007 Daily Journal D.A.R. 9448
- Argument: Oral argument

Case history
- Prior: Summary judgment for defendant granted, No. J 02-008 CV(JWS), 2003 WL 25274689 (D. Alaska May 27, 2003); rev'd, 439 F.3d 1114 (9th Cir. 2006); cert. granted, 127 S. Ct. 722 (2006)

Holding
- Because schools may take steps to safeguard those entrusted to their care from speech that can be regarded as encouraging illegal drug use, the school officials in this case did not violate the First Amendment by confiscating the pro-drug banner and suspending Frederick.

Court membership
- Chief Justice John Roberts Associate Justices John P. Stevens · Antonin Scalia; Anthony Kennedy · David Souter; Clarence Thomas · Ruth Bader Ginsburg; Stephen Breyer · Samuel Alito

Case opinions
- Majority: Roberts, joined by Scalia, Kennedy, Thomas, Alito
- Concurrence: Thomas
- Concurrence: Alito, joined by Kennedy
- Concur/dissent: Breyer
- Dissent: Stevens, joined by Souter, Ginsburg

Laws applied
- U.S. Const. amends. I, XIV; 42 U.S.C. § 1983

Morse v. Frederick, 551 U.S. 393 (2007), is a United States Supreme Court case where the Court held, 5–4, that the First Amendment does not prevent educators from prohibiting or punishing student speech that is reasonably viewed as promoting illegal drug use at a school-sanctioned event.

In 2002, Juneau-Douglas High School principal Deborah Morse suspended student Joseph Frederick after he displayed a banner reading "BONG HiTS 4 JESUS" across the street from the school during the 2002 Winter Olympics torch relay. Frederick sued, claiming his constitutional rights to free speech were violated. His suit was dismissed by the federal district court, but on appeal, the Ninth Circuit reversed the ruling, concluding that Frederick's speech rights were violated. The case then went on to the Supreme Court.

Chief Justice John Roberts, writing for the majority, concluded that school officials did not violate the First Amendment for three reasons. First, under the existing school speech precedents Tinker v. Des Moines Independent Community School District (1969), Bethel School District No. 403 v. Fraser (1986) and Hazelwood School District v. Kuhlmeier (1988), students do have free speech rights in school, but those rights are subject to limitations in the school environment that would not apply to the speech rights of adults outside school. Second, the "school speech" doctrine applied because Frederick's speech occurred at a school-supervised event. Finally, the Court held that the speech could be restricted in a school environment, even though it was not disruptive under the Tinker standard, because "the government interest in stopping student drug abuse...allow[s] schools to restrict student expression that they reasonably regard as promoting illegal drug use."

== Background and procedural history ==
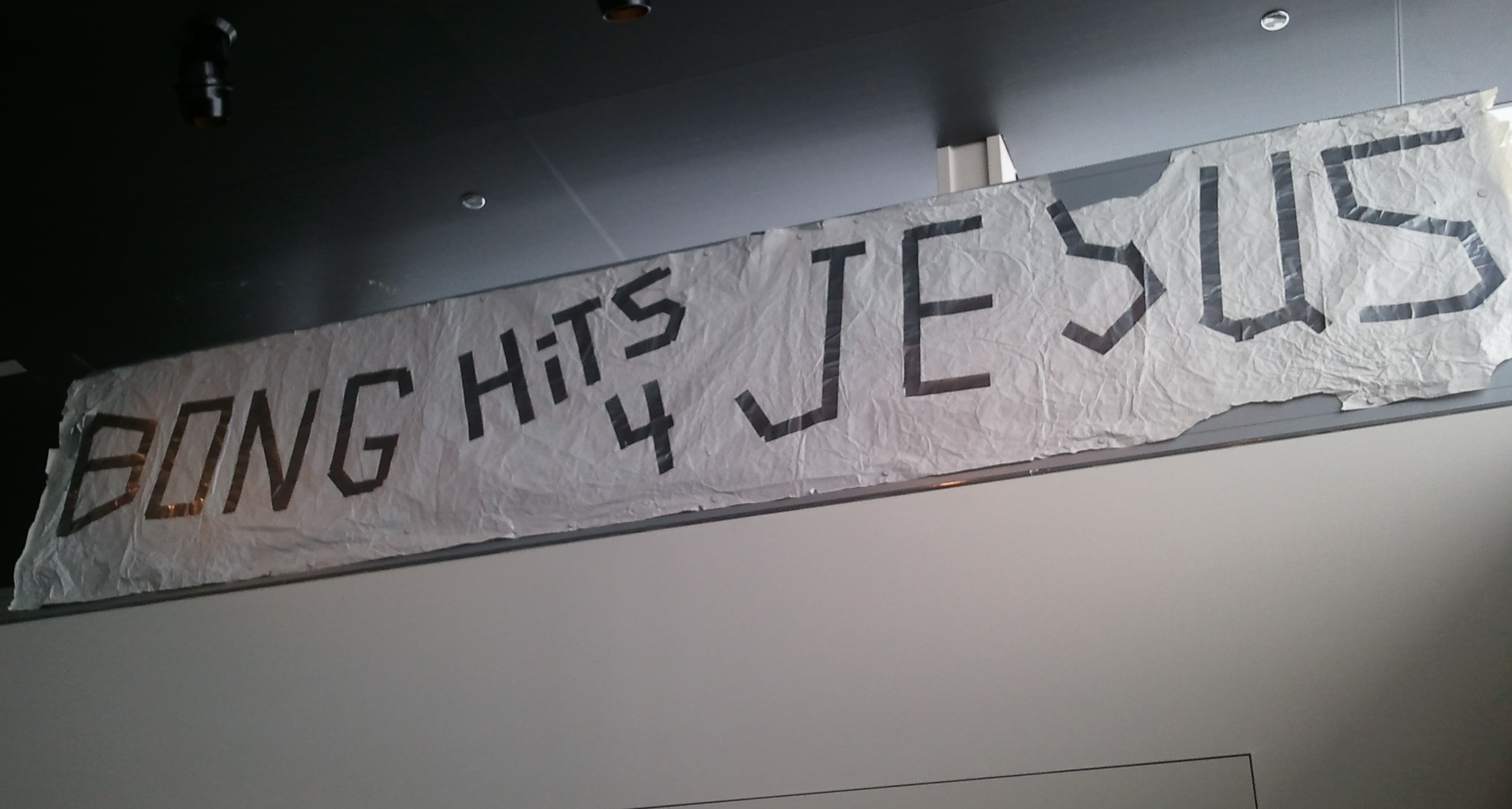
The original banner hung in the Newseum in Washington, DC.

On January 24, 2002, students and faculty at Juneau-Douglas High School in Juneau, Alaska were excused from their morning classes to allow them to watch the Olympic torch pass by as part of the 2002 Winter Olympics torch relay. Joseph Frederick, who was late for school and missed his first-period class, joined some friends on the sidewalk across the street from the school building. (Note: Frederick "parked on a public street" and joined his friends without entering the school building.) Frederick and his friends waited for the television cameras to reach their location so they could unfurl a banner reading "BONG HiTS 4 JESUS". Frederick and his friends had first seen the phrase on a snowboard sticker. When they displayed the banner, then-principal Deborah Morse ran across the street and seized it.

Morse initially suspended Frederick for five days for violating the school district's anti-drug policy, but increased the suspension to ten days after Frederick quoted Thomas Jefferson. Frederick administratively appealed his suspension to the superintendent who denied his claim but limited it to the time Frederick had already spent out of school prior to his appeal (eight days). Frederick then appealed to the Juneau School Board, which upheld the suspension on March 19, 2002.

=== District court ===
On April 25, 2002, Frederick filed a civil rights lawsuit (under 42 U.S.C. § 1983) against Morse and the school board, claiming they violated his federal and state constitutional rights to free speech. He sought declaratory relief (on the applicability of his First Amendment rights), injunctive relief (to remove his ten-day suspension from his school records), and monetary awards (compensatory damages, punitive damages, and attorney's fees).

The United States District Court for the District of Alaska dismissed Frederick's case on summary judgment. The district court reasoned that Bethel School District No. 403 v. Fraser governed Frederick's school speech. Under this precedent, the Court ruled that, given the stipulated facts, Morse and the school board had not infringed Frederick's First Amendment rights, because Morse had reasonably interpreted the banner as contravening the school's policies on drug abuse prevention. Frederick appealed this ruling to the Ninth Circuit Court of Appeals.

=== Ninth Circuit ===
The Ninth Circuit reversed the decision of the District Court. The unanimous panel decision was written by Judge Andrew Kleinfeld. First, the Court decided that the incident should be interpreted under school speech doctrines, even though Frederick was standing across the street, and not on school grounds.

Thus, for Judge Kleinfeld, "the question comes down to whether a school may, in the absence of concern about disruption of educational activities, punish and censor non-disruptive, off-campus speech by students during school-authorized activities because the speech promotes a social message contrary to the one favored by the school. The answer under controlling, long-existing precedent is plainly 'No'." To reach this determination, the Court inquired whether Frederick's constitutional rights were violated. The circuit court, in opposition to the district court, held that Tinker v. Des Moines Independent Community School District was the more relevant precedent.

=== Certiorari and oral arguments ===
The school board petitioned the U.S. Supreme Court to review the Ninth Circuit's decision, with Juneau school district superintendent Peggy Cowan stating, "My concern is that [the court's ruling] could compromise our ability to send a consistent message against the use of illegal drugs." On December 1, 2006, the Court accepted the case.

Oral arguments were heard on the morning of March 19, 2007. Kenneth Starr first spoke on behalf of the petitioning school principal. He described the rule in Tinker v. Des Moines Independent Community School District as allowing speech by school students but "that the speech not be disruptive". He defined disruptiveness in general terms as behavior inimical to the educational mission of the school, and in specific terms as a violation of the school's announced policy to enforce and support laws with respect to the control of marijuana (and other laws in general). Starr also cited the cases of Bethel School District v. Fraser, and Hazelwood v. Kuhlmeier.

Starr noted that in Tinker there was no written policy; it was an issue of "standardless discretion" being exercised. That case was said to be concerned with school disciplinary actions "casting a pall of orthodoxy to prevent the discussion of ideas". Justice David Souter remarked that Bong Hits 4 JESUS "sounds like just a kid's provocative statement to me." Starr responded by saying "the key is to allow the school official to interpret the message as long as that interpretation is reasonable."

Deputy Solicitor-General Edwin Kneedler spoke on behalf of the U.S. government in support of the petitioner. He said: "The First Amendment does not require public school officials to stand aside and permit students who are entrusted to their supervision and care to promote or encourage the illegal use of drugs." He cited the cases of Board of Education v. Earls and Hazelwood v. Kuhlmeier in his favor.

Representing Frederick, Douglas K. Mertz opened, "This is a case about free speech. It is not about drugs." Chief Justice John Roberts responded: "It's a case about money. Your client wants money from the principal personally for her actions in this case." Mertz emphasized that the torch relay was not school-sponsored; that Frederick had not stepped on school property at all before presenting the banner; that "BONG HiTS 4 JESUS" was intended to be—and was regarded as—a purely humorous message; and that the unfurling of the banner did not cause any disruption. Based on these facts, he concluded, his case "does not present the issue of school authority over student expressions on campus or in a school-sponsored activity."

Starr rebutted. He cited Vernonia School District 47J v. Acton and Board of Education v. Earls as cases demonstrative of the Court's strong past stances on matter related to combating the "scourge of drugs". In closing and in summary, he said, "To promote drugs is utterly inconsistent with the educational mission of the school. The court has spoken more broadly with respect to the need to defer to school officials in identifying the educational mission."

== Opinion of the Court ==
Chief Justice Roberts, writing for a majority of five justices, concluded that the school officials did not violate the First Amendment by confiscating the pro-drug banner and suspending the student responsible for it. Roberts determined that Frederick's banner qualified as "school speech" that can be restricted by administrators because it occurred "at a school event". Roberts also determined that the speech was "reasonably viewed as promoting illegal drug use" and acknowledged a school's "important—indeed, perhaps compelling interest" in deterring drug use by students.

First, Roberts determined that the Court should analyze Frederick's speech under the comparatively strict doctrine of "school speech"—rejecting "at the outset" Frederick's contention that the case should instead be considered under ordinary free-speech jurisprudence. While conceding that past precedent reflects "some uncertainty at the outer boundaries as to when courts should apply school-speech precedents", Roberts added: "but not on these facts". "Under these circumstances, we agree with the superintendent that Frederick cannot 'stand in the midst of his fellow students, during school hours, at a school-sanctioned activity and claim he is not at school'."

Next, Roberts determined that the principal's conclusion that Frederick's banner "advocated the use of illegal drugs" was reasonable. Acknowledging that the banner's message was "cryptic", nevertheless it was undeniably a "reference to illegal drugs". In reaching this conclusion, Roberts contrasted "the paucity of alternative meanings the banner might bear" against the fact that the two immediately available interpretations of the words support this conclusion, "bong hits" being equivalent to smoking marijuana which in turn is illegal activity. Roberts also detected no difference between "celebrating illegal drug use in the midst of fellow students and outright advocacy or promotion."

Roberts rejected the two alternative accounts for Frederick's speech provided in the dissent: first, the dissent noted that Frederick "just wanted to get on television", which it characterized as a "credible and uncontradicted explanation for the message". Roberts rejoined: "But that is a description of Frederick's motive for displaying the banner; it is not an interpretation of what the banner says." Second, the dissent emphasized the importance of political speech and the need to foster "national debate about a serious issue". Roberts rejoined that "not even Frederick argues that the banner conveys any sort of political or religious message"; "this is plainly not a case about political debate over the criminalization of drug use or possession."

Finally, Roberts inquired whether a principal may restrict such speech. He concluded that she can per Tinker v. Des Moines Independent Community School Dist. which governs student speech that could disrupt the educational environment, and Bethel School Dist. No. 403 v. Fraser which governs potentially controversial speech on school grounds. Roberts also concluded that both of those precedents allow flexibility for school administrators on which types of speech to prohibit. Finally, Roberts cited Hazelwood School Dist. v. Kuhlmeier which allows school administrators to "exercise editorial control over the style and content of student speech in school-sponsored expressive activities" for pedagogical reasons.

Roberts then considered a school's interest in prohibiting speech that promotes illegal drug use, citing statistics illustrating the problems of youth drug abuse and noting that part of a school's educational mission is "to educate students about the dangers of illegal drugs and to discourage their use." Roberts determined that Frederick's banner could create peer pressure and that the principal's actions were motivated by a "serious and palpable" danger of drug abuse. Morse's actions sent "a powerful message to the students in her charge, including Frederick, about how serious the school was about the dangers of illegal drug use." The First Amendment "does not require schools to tolerate at school events student expression that contributes to those dangers."

=== Concurring opinions ===
Justice Clarence Thomas wrote a concurrence that argued that students in public schools do not have a right to free speech at all and that Tinker should be overturned. Thomas wrote, "In my view, the history of public education suggests that the First Amendment, as originally understood, does not protect student speech in public schools." He praised Hugo Black's dissenting opinion in Tinker and called it "prophetic". According to Thomas, because originally public schools were intended to substitute for private tutors, public schools could discipline students as they liked and had a far stronger hand in what happened in the classroom. "In short", he continues, "in the earliest public schools, teachers taught, and students listened. Teachers commanded, and students obeyed." He opined that because parents entrusted the care of their children to teachers, teachers have a right to act in the place of parents during school hours. Therefore, teachers should be able to discipline students if necessary. Thomas lambasted Tinker for "usurping [the local school district as a] traditional authority for the judiciary". Thomas believed that Frederick was neither speaking gibberish nor openly advocating drug use, but granting such an impertinence constitutional protection "would... be to 'surrender control of the American public school system to public school students'."

Justice Samuel Alito, joined by Justice Anthony Kennedy, wrote a concurrence indicating that he agreed with the majority opinion to the extent that it focused on Frederick's possible glamorization of illegal drug use without infringing on social or political speech. Alito concluded that an exception must be made to the First Amendment free speech guarantee to protect the students; since according to Alito, advocating illegal drugs possibly leads to violence. But Alito insisted that this small reduction of what is protected by the First Amendment is "at the far reaches of what the First Amendment permits."

Justice Stephen Breyer concurred in the judgment in part and dissented in part, arguing that the Court should not have directly answered the First Amendment question in the case, but rather decided it based on qualified immunity for school administrators against sanctions for using their personal judgment on behalf of students. Because it was not clear whether the school principal's actions in taking down the banner violated the First Amendment, Breyer would have simply issued a narrow decision indicating that she was shielded by qualified immunity and gone no further.

=== Dissenting opinion ===
Justice John Paul Stevens, in a dissent joined by Justice David Souter and Justice Ruth Bader Ginsburg, argued that "the Court does serious violence to the First Amendment in upholding—indeed, lauding—a school's decision to punish Frederick for expressing a view with which it disagreed." Stevens wrote:

... the school's interest in protecting its students from exposure to speech 'reasonably regarded as promoting illegal drug use' ... cannot justify disciplining Frederick for his attempt to make an ambiguous statement to a television audience simply because it contained an oblique reference to drugs. The First Amendment demands more, indeed, much more.

Stevens criticized the majority decision as one that "trivializes the two cardinal principles upon which Tinker rests", because it "upholds a punishment meted out on the basis of a listener's disagreement with her understanding (or, more likely, misunderstanding) of the speaker's viewpoint". Moreover, he noted, "Encouraging drug use might well increase the likelihood that a listener will try an illegal drug, but that hardly justifies censorship". "[C]arving out pro-drug speech for uniquely harsh treatment finds no support in our case law and is inimical to the values protected by the First Amendment."

Stevens also took issue with the majority's interpretation of the banner as being a serious incitement to drug use:

Admittedly, some high school students (including those who use drugs) are dumb. Most students, however, do not shed their brains at the schoolhouse gate, and most students know dumb advocacy when they see it. The notion that the message on this banner would actually persuade either the average student or even the dumbest one to change his or her behavior is most implausible.

Stevens argued that it would be "profoundly unwise to create special rules for speech about drug and alcohol use", pointing to the historical examples of both opposition to the Vietnam War and resistance to Prohibition in the 1920s. Pointing to the current debate over medical marijuana, Stevens concluded, "Surely our national experience with alcohol should make us wary of dampening speech suggesting—however inarticulately—that it would be better to tax and regulate marijuana than to persevere in a futile effort to ban its use entirely."

== Academic commentary ==
Melinda Cupps Dickler, in her article "The Morse Quartet: Student Speech and the First Amendment" in the Loyola Law Review, provided a survey of commentary that followed in the immediate aftermath of the case: Some commentators have suggested that Morse both demonstrated a division among the Justices on student speech rights and continued the erosion of students' First Amendment rights from the Fraser and Kuhlmeier precedents. She regards this suggestion as "not surprising" given the outcome of the decision, the plain language of the holding, and the dissenting Justices' charge that the opinion did "serious violence to the First Amendment". She adds that other commentators have asserted that while Morse did not dramatically change the law regarding student speech, it failed to answer any of the questions left by the Tinker/Fraser/Kuhlmeier trilogy. Further, "such questions are always paramount because schools are the training grounds for our nation's citizens and future leaders." Dickler noted that "The few courts that have discussed Morse have disagreed about the breadth of its holding."

Kenneth Starr, who argued on behalf of Morse before the Supreme Court, introduced a symposium about the case noting that Chief Justice Roberts "sought to keep the decision quite narrow", limiting the case "to the issue of public school administrators' ability to keep the educational process free from messages about illegal drugs" and drawing from the Court's existing student speech jurisprudence that "permitted school administrators broad discretion to keep out of the educational environment antisocial messages celebrating drug use".

Leading constitutional law scholar Erwin Chemerinsky participated in the same symposium, exploring how this decision would be understood and applied by school officials, school boards, and lower court judges. He suggested that the opinion was misguided and—from a First Amendment perspective—highly undesirable, arguing that the decision cannot be justified under existing First Amendment principles, that it could be seen as authorizing punishment of students for speech that is deemed distasteful or offensive, even just juvenile. However, he noted Justice Alito's concurring opinion, which suggests that the majority opinion might be exceedingly narrow and based on a very unusual factual context; Chemerinsky noted that if Justice Alito's opinion is seen as defining the scope of the holding, then the case establishes only the power of schools to punish speech encouraging illegal drug use rather than giving school officials great discretion to punish student speech.

== Groups involved ==
The American Civil Liberties Union directly participated in this case on the side of Joseph Frederick. The Center for Individual Rights, National Coalition Against Censorship, and other groups that advocate First Amendment protection filed amici curiae in support of Frederick. Students for Sensible Drug Policy also noted that banning drug-related speech would undermine their ability to have chapters in public schools. The American Center for Law and Justice, and Rutherford Institute, and several other Christian right groups also filed briefs on the side of Frederick, reasoning that if schools could ban "offensive" speech they would also be able to prohibit religious speech with which administrators disagree. On this point, the Christian right groups prevailed, as the Supreme Court explicitly declined to hold that school boards could discipline "offensive" speech, noting that "much political and religious speech might be perceived as offensive to some" and the concern is "not that Frederick's speech was offensive, but that it was reasonably viewed as promoting illegal drug use."

The National School Boards Association supported Morse and the Juneau school district, arguing that schools should be able to regulate controversial speech. U.S. Solicitor General Paul Clement filed an amicus brief in support of the school district's decision to prohibit controversial speech. On March 19, 2007, Students for Sensible Drug Policy organized a free speech rally at the Supreme Court during oral arguments. The Drug Policy Alliance and the National Youth Rights Association assisted with the rally which brought dozens of students from across the country to the court steps.

== Aftermath ==
The U.S. Supreme Court decision did not resolve all of the issues in the case. Frederick claimed his speech rights under the Constitution of Alaska were violated, and the issue was argued in front of the Alaska Court of Appeals in September 2008. However, the school district agreed to settle out of court before the judges reached a decision. In November 2008, the district paid Frederick $45,000 to settle all remaining claims and agreed to hire a neutral constitutional law expert to lead a forum on student speech at Juneau-Douglas High School by the end of the school year. Frederick later said that while he was proud of himself for standing up for his rights, he regretted "the bad precedent set by the ruling."

The original "BONG HiTS 4 JESUS" banner hung in the First Amendment gallery of the now-defunct Newseum in Washington, D.C.

== See also ==
- Censorship of student media in the United States
- List of United States Supreme Court cases, volume 551
