= Tinker v. Des Moines Independent Community School District =

1969 United States Supreme Court case

- Supreme Court of the United States

Argued November 12, 1968 Decided February 24, 1969
- Full case name: John F. Tinker and Mary Beth Tinker, minors, by their father and next friend, Leonard Tinker and Christopher Eckhardt, minor, by his father and next friend, William Eckhardt v. The Des Moines Independent Community School District, et al.
- Citations: 393 U.S. 503 (more) 89 S. Ct. 733; 21 L. Ed. 2d 731; 1969 U.S. LEXIS 2443; 49 Ohio Op. 2d 222
- Argument: Oral argument

Case history
- Prior: Plaintiff's complaint dismissed, 258 F.Supp. 971 (S.D. Iowa 1966); affirmed, 383 F.2d 988 (8th Cir. 1967); cert. granted, 390 U.S. 942 (1968)
- Subsequent: None on record

Holding
- The First Amendment, as applied through the Fourteenth, did not permit a public school to punish a student for wearing a black armband as an anti-war protest, absent any evidence that the rule was necessary to avoid substantial interference with school discipline or the rights of others.

Court membership
- Chief Justice Earl Warren Associate Justices Hugo Black · William O. Douglas; John M. Harlan II · William J. Brennan Jr. Potter Stewart · Byron White; Abe Fortas · Thurgood Marshall

Case opinions
- Majority: Fortas, joined by Warren, Douglas, Brennan, White, Marshall
- Concurrence: Stewart
- Concurrence: White
- Dissent: Black
- Dissent: Harlan

Laws applied
- U.S. Const. amends. I, XIV; 42 U.S.C. § 1983

Tinker v. Des Moines Independent Community School District, 393 U.S. 503 (1969), is a landmark decision by the United States Supreme Court that recognized the First Amendment rights of students in U.S. public schools. The Tinker test, also known as the "substantial disruption" test, is still used by courts today to determine whether a school's interest in preventing disruption outweighs students' First Amendment rights. The Court famously opined, "It can hardly be argued that either students or teachers shed their constitutional rights to freedom of speech or expression at the schoolhouse gate."

== Background ==
Mary and John showing the black armbands which they wore to school

On December 16, 1965, five students in Des Moines, Iowa, decided to wear black armbands to school in protest of American involvement in the Vietnam War and supporting the Christmas Truce that was called for by Senator Robert F. Kennedy. The students were John F. Tinker (aged 15), his siblings Mary Beth Tinker (13), Hope Tinker (11), and Paul Tinker (8), and their friend Christopher Eckhardt (16). The students wore the armbands to several schools in the Des Moines Independent Community School District (North High School for John, Roosevelt High School for Christopher, Warren Harding Junior High School for Mary Beth, elementary school for Hope and Paul).

The Tinker family had been involved in civil rights activism before the student protest. The Tinker children's mother, Lorena, was a leader of the Peace Organization in Des Moines. Christopher Eckhardt and John Tinker attended a protest of the war the previous month in Washington, D.C. The principals of the Des Moines schools learned of the plan and met before the incident occurred on December 16 to create a policy that schoolchildren wearing an armband would be asked to remove it immediately. Students violating the policy would be suspended and allowed to return to school only after agreeing to comply with it. The participants decided to violate this policy. Hope and Paul Tinker were not in violation of the policy, since it did not apply to elementary schools, and were not punished. No violence or disruption was shown to have occurred due to the students wearing the armbands. Mary Beth Tinker and Christopher Eckhardt were suspended from school for wearing the armbands on December 16 and John Tinker was suspended for the same reason the next day.

=== Legal precedents and issues ===
Previous decisions, such as West Virginia State Board of Education v. Barnette, established that students had some constitutional protections in public school. This case was the first time that the court set forth standards for safeguarding public school students' free speech rights. It involved symbolic speech, which was first recognized in Stromberg v. California.

== Lower courts ==
A suit was filed after the Iowa Civil Liberties Union approached the Tinker family, and the ICLU agreed to help with the lawsuit. Dan Johnston was the lead attorney on the case.

The Des Moines Independent Community School District represented the school officials who suspended the students. The children's fathers filed suit in U.S. District Court, which upheld the Des Moines school board's decision.

A tie vote in the U.S. Court of Appeals for the 8th Circuit meant that the U.S. District Court's decision continued to stand, which led the Tinkers and Eckhardts to appeal to the Supreme Court.

The only students involved in the lawsuit were Mary Beth Tinker, John Tinker, and Christopher Eckhardt. During the case, the Tinker family received hate mail, death threats, and other hateful messages.

The case was argued before the court on November 12, 1968. It was funded by Des Moines residents Louise Noun, who was the president of the Iowa Civil Liberties Union, and her brother, Joseph Rosenfield, a businessman.

== Decision ==
=== Majority opinion ===
The court's 7–2 decision in favor of the students held that the First Amendment applied to public schools, and that administrators would have to demonstrate constitutionally valid reasons for any specific regulation of speech in the classroom. Justice Abe Fortas wrote the majority opinion, holding that the speech regulation at issue was "based upon an urgent wish to avoid the controversy which might result from the expression, even by the silent symbol of armbands, of opposition to this Nation's part in the conflagration in Vietnam." This decision made students and adults equal in terms of First Amendment rights while at school. Bethel School District v. Fraser and Hazelwood v. Kuhlmeier later rewrote this implication, limiting the freedoms granted to students.

The Court held that for school officials to justify censoring speech, they "must be able to show that [their] action was caused by something more than a mere desire to avoid the discomfort and unpleasantness that always accompany an unpopular viewpoint" and that the conduct that would "materially and substantially interfere with the requirements of appropriate discipline in the operation of the school." The Court found that, by wearing armbands, the Tinkers did not cause disruption, and that their activity was constitutionally protected symbolic speech. The Court ruled that First Amendment rights were not absolute, and could be overridden if there was a "carefully restricted circumstance". Student speech that has the potential to cause disruption is not protected by Tinker.

=== Dissents ===
Justices Hugo Black and John M. Harlan II dissented. Black, who had long believed that disruptive "symbolic speech" was not constitutionally protected, wrote, "While I have always believed that under the First and Fourteenth Amendments neither the State nor the Federal Government has any authority to regulate or censor the content of speech, I have never believed that any person has a right to give speeches or engage in demonstrations where he pleases and when he pleases." Black argued that the Tinkers' behavior was indeed disruptive, writing, "I repeat that if the time has come when pupils of state-supported schools ... can defy and flout orders of school officials to keep their minds on their own schoolwork, it is the beginning of a new revolutionary era of permissiveness in this country fostered by the judiciary."

Harlan dissented on the grounds that he found "nothing in this record which impugns the good faith of respondents in promulgating the armband regulation."

== Legacy ==
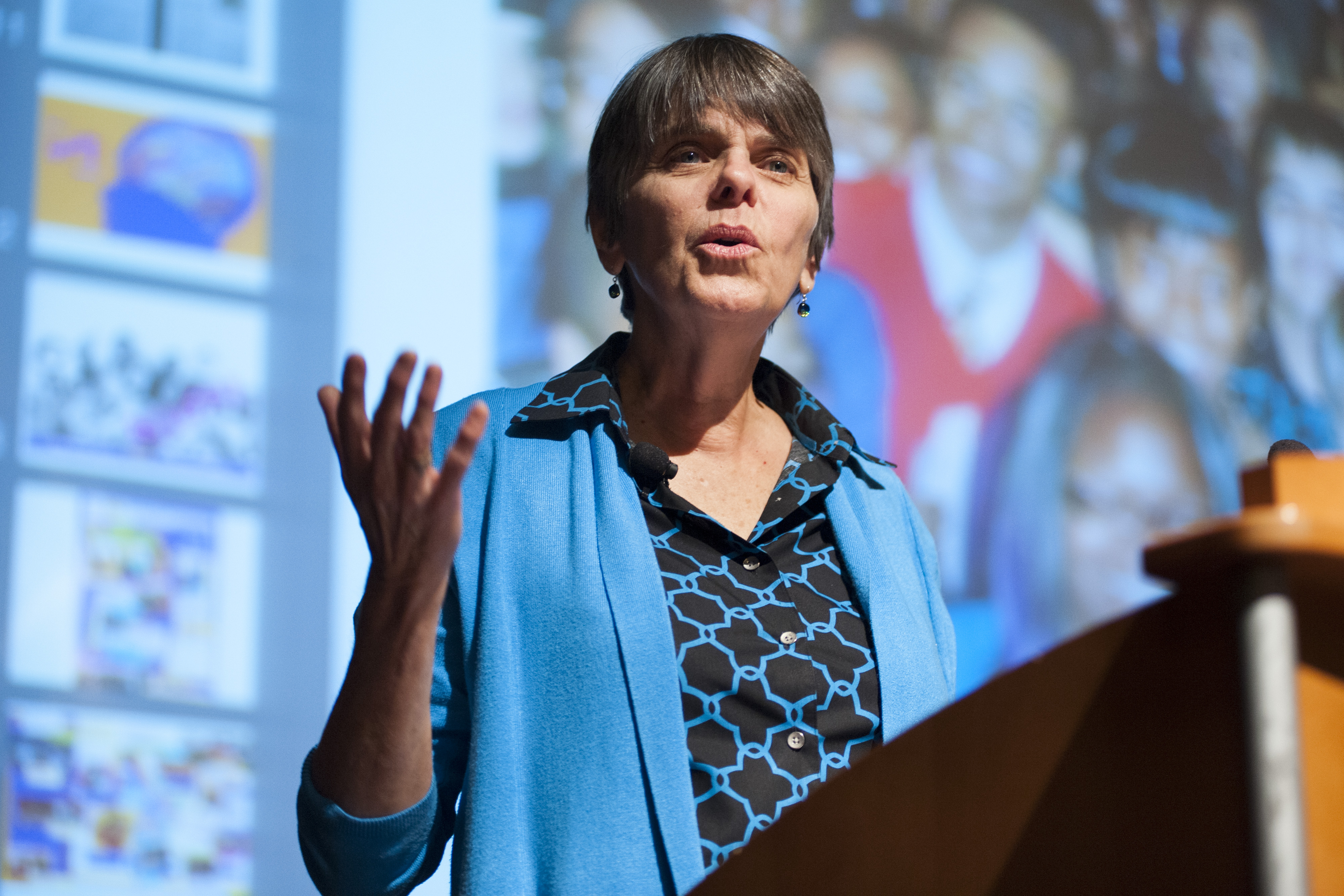
Mary Beth Tinker speaks at Ohio University in 2014 during her Tinker Tour USA.

=== Subsequent jurisprudence ===
Tinker remains a viable and frequently cited court precedent, and court decisions citing Tinker have both protected and limited the scope of student free speech rights. Tinker was cited in the 1973 case Papish v. Board of Curators of the University of Missouri, which held that the expulsion of a student for distributing a newspaper on campus containing what the school deemed "indecent speech" violated the First Amendment. In the 1986 case Bethel School District v. Fraser, the Supreme Court held that a high school student's sexual innuendo-laden speech during a school assembly was not constitutionally protected. The court said the protection of student political speech created in Tinker did not extend to vulgar language in a school setting. The court ruled that similar language may be constitutionally protected if used by adults to make a political point, but that those protections did not apply to students in a public school.

In the 1988 case Hazelwood v. Kuhlmeier, a high school principal blocked the school paper from publishing two articles about divorce and teenage pregnancy. The Supreme Court ruled that schools have the right to regulate the content of non-forum, school-sponsored newspapers under "legitimate pedagogical concerns". It reasoned that the principal's editorial decision was justified because the paper was a non-public forum since it was school-sponsored and existed as a platform for students in a journalism class. The Court in Hazelwood said that under the doctrine of Perry Education Association v. Perry Local Educators Association, a 1982 case that clarified the definition of a public forum, a school facility like a newspaper qualifies as a public forum only if school authorities make it available for "indiscriminate use by the general public".

The Court's rulings in Fraser and Hazelwood state that a "substantial disruption" or infringement of other students' rights was reason enough to restrict student freedom of speech or expression. Some experts argue that the three individual cases each act independently of one another and govern different types of student speech. It is argued that Fraser does not interfere with Tinker, since Fraser questions sexual speech while Tinker protects political speech. While some believe Fraser and Kuhlmeier overrule Tinker's protections, others believe that they created exceptions to Tinker. Others argue that a broad reading of Tinker allows for viewpoint discrimination on certain topics of student speech.

In 2013, the U.S. Court of Appeals for the Third Circuit reheard a case en banc that had been argued before a panel of three of its judges, considering whether middle school students could be prohibited from wearing bracelets promoting breast cancer awareness that were imprinted with "I ♥ Boobies! (Keep a Breast)." The Third Circuit cited Tinker when ruling that the school's ban on the bracelets violated the students' right to free speech because the bracelets were not plainly offensive or disruptive. The court also cited Fraser, saying the bracelets were not lewd speech. The Supreme Court later declined to hear the case.

Several cases have arisen from the modern display of the Confederate flag. Courts applying the "substantial disruption test" under Tinker have held that schools may prohibit students from wearing clothing with Confederate symbols. The U.S. Court of Appeals for the Fourth Circuit cited Tinker in the 2013 case Hardwick v. Heyward to rule that prohibiting a student from wearing Confederate flag shirt did not violate the First Amendment because there was evidence that the shirt could cause disruption. Exceptions to this are the 2010 case Defoe v. Spiva and the 2000 case Castorina v. Madison County School Board. In Castorina v. Madison County School Board, the U.S. Court of Appeals for the Sixth Circuit held that based on Tinker and other Supreme Court rulings, the school board could not ban Confederate flag T-shirts while other "controversial racial and political symbols" like the "X" symbol associated with Malcolm X and the African American Muslim movement were permitted. In Defoe v. Spiva, the U.S. Court of Appeals for the Sixth Circuit ruled that "racially hostile or contemptuous speech" can be restricted even if it is not disruptive. This deviated from Tinker, which says the school's restriction of the Tinkers' speech was unconstitutional because it was not disruptive.

In 2014, The U.S. Court of Appeals for the Ninth Circuit applied Tinker in Dariano v. Morgan Hill Unified School District to rule that a California school did not violate the First Amendment when it banned American flag apparel during a Cinco de Mayo celebration. The school said it had enacted the ban due to a conflict caused by American flag apparel at the event the previous year. The Ninth Circuit declined to rehear the case en banc and the U.S. Supreme Court later declined to hear the case.

In 2017, a Pennsylvania high school cheerleader who had been reprimanded by her school for using offensive language in a social media post she made off-campus and outside school hours sued the school, claiming her First Amendment rights had been infringed. The district court ruled in her favor, and the school district appealed to the Third Circuit. There, the three-judge panel upheld the district ruling unanimously, but the majority wrote that Tinker could never apply to a student's off-campus speech, while Judge Thomas L. Ambro found this claim too broad. The school petitioned to the Supreme Court, which upheld the ruling in favor of the student in Mahanoy Area School District v. B.L., but overturned the Third Circuit's ruling that Tinker may cover some parts of off-campus speech when the school has a compelling interest, such as incidents of harassment or threats. The Supreme Court did not specify when such off-campus speech falls under a school's compelling interest.

=== Tinker Tour ===
In 2013, Mary Beth Tinker embarked on a tour of the United States, called the Tinker Tour, to "bring real-life civics lessons to students through the Tinker armband story and the stories of other young people." The tour was a project of the Student Press Law Center.

== See also ==
- List of United States Supreme Court cases, volume 393
- Schenck v. United States, 249 U.S. 47 (1919)
- Shanley v. Northeast Independent School District (1972)
- Miller v. California, 413 U.S. 15 (1973)
- Broussard v. School Board of Norfolk (1992)
- Gillman v. Holmes County School District (2008)
