= Frederickson, Washington =

- CDP
- Location of Frederickson, Washington

- Location within Washington (state) Location within the United States
- Coordinates: 47.091771°N 122.361615°W
- Country: United States
- State: Washington
- County: Pierce

Area
  - Total: 11.318 sq mi (29.313 km^{2})
  - Land: 11.311 sq mi (29.295 km^{2})
  - Water: 0.0073 sq mi (0.019 km^{2}) 0.06%
- Elevation: 410 ft (125 m)

Population (2020)
  - Total: 24,906
  - Estimate (2023): 24,219
  - Density: 2,202.0/sq mi (850.21/km^{2})
- Time zone: UTC–8 (Pacific (PST))
  - Summer (DST): UTC–7 (PDT)
- ZIP Codes: 98375, 98387, 98445, 98446
- Area code: 253
- FIPS code: 53-25475
- GNIS feature ID: 2408258

Frederickson is a census-designated place (CDP) in Pierce County, Washington, United States. The population was 24,906 at the 2020 census, and was estimated at 24,219 in 2023.

== Geography ==
According to the United States Census Bureau, the CDP has a total area of 11.318 square miles (29.31 km^{2}), of which 11.311 square miles (29.30 km^{2}) is land and 0.007 square miles (0.02 km^{2}) (0.06%) is water.

According to the Frederickson Community Plan published by Pierce County (May 1, 2003) Frederickson's total area is 8,003 acres or 12.5 square miles.

== Demographics ==
Historical population
| Census | Pop. | Note | %± |
|---|---|---|---|
| 1990 | 3,502 | | — |
| 2000 | 5,758 | | 64.4% |
| 2010 | 18,719 | | 225.1% |
| 2020 | 24,906 | | 33.1% |
| 2023 (est.) | 24,219 | ▼ | −2.8% |
U.S. Decennial Census; 1970 1980 1990; 2000 2010

=== American Community Survey ===
As of the 2023 American Community Survey, there are 7,763 estimated households in Frederickson with an average of 3.1 persons per household. The CDP has a median household income of $107,241. Approximately 4.9% of the CDP's population lives at or below the poverty line. Frederickson has an estimated 61.1% employment rate, with 21.9% of the population holding a bachelor's degree or higher and 88.5% holding a high school diploma. There were 8,272 housing units at an average density of 731.32 per square mile (282.4/km^{2}).

The top five reported languages (people were allowed to report up to two languages, thus the figures will generally add to more than 100%) were English (_%), Spanish (_%), Indo-European (_%), Asian and Pacific Islander (_%), and Other (_%).

=== Racial and ethnic composition ===
Frederickson CDP, Washington – Racial and ethnic composition Note: the US Census treats Hispanic/Latino as an ethnic category. This table excludes Latinos from the racial categories and assigns them to a separate category. Hispanics/Latinos may be of any race.
| Race / Ethnicity (NH = Non-Hispanic) | Pop 1990 | Pop 2000 | Pop 2010 | Pop 2020 | % 1990 | % 2000 | % 2010 | % 2020 |
|---|---|---|---|---|---|---|---|---|
| White alone (NH) | 3,243 | 4,730 | 12,903 | 13,565 | 92.60% | 82.15% | 68.93% | 54.46% |
| Black or African American alone (NH) | 51 | 178 | 1,284 | 2,308 | 1.46% | 3.09% | 6.86% | 9.27% |
| Native American or Alaska Native alone (NH) | 31 | 88 | 166 | 227 | 0.89% | 1.53% | 0.89% | 0.91% |
| Asian alone (NH) | 82 | 208 | 1,013 | 1,649 | 2.34% | 3.61% | 5.41% | 6.62% |
| Native Hawaiian or Pacific Islander alone (NH) | x | 44 | 409 | 913 | x | 0.76% | 2.18% | 3.67% |
| Other race alone (NH) | 2 | 12 | 39 | 165 | 0.06% | 0.21% | 0.21% | 0.66% |
| Mixed race or Multiracial (NH) | x | 241 | 1,232 | 2,662 | x | 4.19% | 6.58% | 10.69% |
| Hispanic or Latino (any race) | 93 | 257 | 1,673 | 3,417 | 2.66% | 4.46% | 8.94% | 13.72% |
| Total | 3,502 | 5,758 | 18,719 | 24,906 | 100.00% | 100.00% | 100.00% | 100.00% |

=== 2020 census ===
As of the 2020 census, Frederickson had a population of 24,906. The population density was 2,201.93 inhabitants per square mile (850.2/km^{2}). There were 8,268 housing units at an average density of 730.97 per square mile (282.2/km^{2}), of which 3.4% were vacant; the homeowner vacancy rate was 1.0% and the rental vacancy rate was 3.7%.

There were 7,991 households, of which 42.0% had children under the age of 18 living in them. Of all households, 57.8% were married-couple households, 15.0% were households with a male householder and no spouse or partner present, and 18.0% were households with a female householder and no spouse or partner present. About 14.8% of all households were made up of individuals and 4.6% had someone living alone who was 65 years of age or older.

The median age was 33.4 years; 27.7% of residents were under the age of 18 and 9.2% were 65 years of age or older. For every 100 females there were 100.4 males, and for every 100 females age 18 and over there were 98.5 males age 18 and over.

All residents lived in urban areas, while none lived in rural areas.

Racial composition as of the 2020 census
| Race | Number | Percent |
|---|---|---|
| White | 14,211 | 57.1% |
| Black or African American | 2,434 | 9.8% |
| American Indian and Alaska Native | 315 | 1.3% |
| Asian | 1,699 | 6.8% |
| Native Hawaiian and Other Pacific Islander | 943 | 3.8% |
| Some other race | 1,462 | 5.9% |
| Two or more races | 3,842 | 15.4% |

=== 2010 census ===
As of the 2010 census, there were 18,719 people, 6,237 households, and _ families residing in the CDP. The population density was 1,620.13 inhabitants per square mile (625.5/km^{2}). There were 6,604 housing units at an average density of 571.58 per square mile (220.7/km^{2}). The racial makeup of the CDP was 72.83% White, 7.27% African American, 1.13% Native American, 5.59% Asian, 2.24% Pacific Islander, 2.87% from some other races and 8.07% from two or more races. Hispanic or Latino people of any race were 8.94% of the population.

=== 2000 census ===
As of the 2000 census, there were 5,758 people, 1,877 households, and 1,542 families residing in the CDP. The population density was 789.6 inhabitants per square mile (304.9/km^{2}). There were 1,963 housing units at an average density of 269.2 per square mile (103.9/km^{2}). The racial makeup of the CDP was 84.40% White, 3.18% African American, 1.56% Native American, 3.66% Asian, 0.85% Pacific Islander, 1.60% from some other races and 4.74% from two or more races. Hispanic or Latino people of any race were 4.46% of the population.

There were 1,877 households, out of which 46.1% had children under the age of 18 living with them, 69.0% were married couples living together, 8.6% had a female householder with no husband present, and 17.8% were non-families. 12.8% of all households were made up of individuals, and 3.8% had someone living alone who was 65 years of age or older. The average household size was 3.03 and the average family size was 3.28.

In the CDP, the population was spread out, with 31.1% under the age of 18, 7.1% from 18 to 24, 35.2% from 25 to 44, 20.0% from 45 to 64, and 6.7% who were 65 years of age or older. The median age was 32 years. For every 100 females, there were 107.8 males. For every 100 females age 18 and over, there were 107.1 males.

The median income for a household in the CDP was $56,862, and the median income for a family was $57,060. Males had a median income of $41,439 versus $28,690 for females. The per capita income for the CDP was $19,385. About 5.8% of families and 7.4% of the population were below the poverty line, including 9.8% of those under age 18 and 14.3% of those age 65 or over.

== Education ==
Public schools in Frederickson are part of the Bethel School District. Schools in or near Frederickson include:

- Elementary Schools:
  - Clover Creek Elementary School
  - Frederickson Elementary School
  - Naches Trail Elementary School
- Middle Schools:
  - Bethel Middle School
  - Liberty Middle School
  - Cedarcrest Middle School
- High Schools:
  - Graham-Kapowsin High School
  - Spanaway Lake High School
- Private school:
  - Bethel Baptist Christian School (grades K4-12)
- Nearby colleges:
  - Pacific Lutheran University (Parkland)
  - Colleges in Tacoma
  - Colleges in Lakewood
  - Colleges in Puyallup
  - Colleges offering classes at Joint Base Lewis-McChord
