= Bethel School District (Washington) =

School district in Washington, United States

Location
- Pierce County, Washington

District information
- Type: Public
- Grades: K-12
- Superintendent: Brian Lowney
- Schools: 27
- NCES District ID: 5300480

Other information
- Website: www.bethelsd.org

Bethel School District No. 403 is a public school district in Pierce County, Washington, USA and serves 200 square miles (520 km^{2}) of unincorporated Pierce County including Spanaway, Graham, Kapowsin and the city of Roy. Bethel was unique in the way that its high schools served grades 10-12 as opposed to the traditional grades of 9-12 of many other districts. In September 2011, Bethel School District planned to switch to a traditional 9-12 district, which occurred in the 2012-2013 school year.

As of May 2013, the district had an enrollment of 17,642 students. The superintendent is Brian Lowney, who became the district's leader in 2024.

== Boundary ==
The district includes:

Elk Plain, Roy, South Creek, Spanaway. It also includes the majority of the following: Frederickson, Graham, and Kapowsin. Additionally, it has portions of Clover Creek, Fort Lewis, McChord Field, Parkland, South Hill, and Summit View.

== Schools ==
=== High schools ===
- Bethel High School
- Challenger Secondary School
- Graham-Kapowsin High School
- Spanaway Lake High School

=== Middle high schools ===
- Bethel Middle School
- Cedarcrest Middle School
- Cougar Mountain Middle School
- Frontier Junior High School
- Spanaway Middle School
- Liberty Middle School

=== K-8 ===
- Elk Plain School of Choice

=== Elementary schools ===
- Camas Prairie Elementary School
- Centennial Elementary School
- Clover Creek Elementary School
- Evergreen Elementary School
- Expedition Elementary School
- Frederickson Elementary School
- Graham Elementary School
- Kapowsin Elementary School
- Katherine G. Johnson Elementary
- Naches Trail Elementary School
- Nelson Elementary School
- North Star Elementary School
- Pioneer Valley Elementary School
- Roy Elementary School
- Rocky Ridge Elementary School
- Shining Mountain Elementary School
- Spanaway Elementary School
- Thompson Elementary School

=== Alternative Education ===
- Bethel Acceleration Academy

== See also ==
- Bethel School District v. Fraser
