= Elk Plain, Washington =

- CDP
- Location of Elk Plain, Washington
- Coordinates: 47°02′44″N 122°22′23″W
- Country: United States
- State: Washington
- County: Pierce

Area
  - Total: 8.387 sq mi (21.722 km^{2})
  - Land: 8.380 sq mi (21.704 km^{2})
  - Water: 0.0073 sq mi (0.019 km^{2})
- Elevation: 479 ft (146 m)

Population (2020)
  - Total: 14,534
  - Density: 1,734.5/sq mi (669.71/km^{2})
- Time zone: UTC−8 (Pacific (PST))
  - Summer (DST): UTC−7 (PDT)
- ZIP Code: 98387
- Area code: 253
- FIPS code: 53-21205
- GNIS feature ID: 2408074

Elk Plain is a census-designated place (CDP) in Pierce County, Washington, United States. The population was 14,534 at the 2020 census.

== Geography ==
According to the United States Census Bureau, the CDP has a total area of 8.387 square miles (21.72 km^{2}), of which 8.380 square miles (21.70 km^{2}) are land and 0.007 square miles (0.02 km^{2}) are water.

== Demographics ==
Historical population
Census	Pop.	Note	%±
1990	12,197		—
2000	15,697		28.7%
2010	14,205		−9.5%
2020	14,534		2.3%
U.S. Decennial Census; 1970 1980 1990; 2000 2010

=== Racial and ethnic composition ===
Elk Plain, Washington – racial and ethnic composition Note: the US Census treats Hispanic/Latino as an ethnic category. This table excludes Latinos from the racial categories and assigns them to a separate category. Hispanics/Latinos may be of any race.
Race / ethnicity (NH = non-Hispanic)	Pop. 2000	Pop. 2010	Pop. 2020	% 2000	% 2010	% 2020
White alone (NH)	12,283	10,722	10,095	78.25%	75.48%	69.46%
Black or African American alone (NH)	825	628	590	5.26%	4.42%	4.06%
Native American or Alaska Native alone (NH)	184	157	149	1.17%	1.11%	1.03%
Asian alone (NH)	621	484	494	3.96%	3.41%	3.40%
Pacific Islander alone (NH)	205	324	291	1.31%	2.28%	2.00%
Other race alone (NH)	36	23	94	0.23%	0.16%	0.65%
Mixed race or multiracial (NH)	800	881	1,317	5.10%	6.20%	9.06%
Hispanic or Latino (any race)	743	986	1,504	4.73%	6.94%	10.35%
Total	15,697	14,205	14,534	100.00%	100.00%	100.00%

=== 2020 census ===
As of the 2020 census, there were 14,534 people and 3,821 families residing in the CDP. The population density was 1,734.4 inhabitants per square mile (669.7/km^{2}). There were 5,094 housing units at an average density of 607.9 per square mile (234.7/km^{2}).

The median age was 38.6 years. 23.5% of residents were under the age of 18, 4.9% were under 5 years of age, and 13.9% were 65 years of age or older. For every 100 females, there were 103.0 males, and for every 100 females age 18 and over there were 101.4 males age 18 and over.

100.0% of residents lived in urban areas, while 0.0% lived in rural areas.

There were 4,967 households in Elk Plain, of which 35.1% had children under the age of 18 living in them. Of all households, 57.1% were married-couple households, 16.4% were households with a male householder and no spouse or partner present, and 17.7% were households with a female householder and no spouse or partner present. About 16.3% of all households were made up of individuals and 6.3% had someone living alone who was 65 years of age or older. Of all housing units, 2.5% were vacant. The homeowner vacancy rate was 0.8% and the rental vacancy rate was 3.1%.

=== 2010 census ===
As of the 2010 census, there were 14,205 people, 4,707 households, and 3,759 families residing in the CDP. The population density was 1,846.9 inhabitants per square mile (713.1/km^{2}). There were 4,929 housing units at an average density of 641.0 per square mile (247.5/km^{2}). The racial makeup of the CDP was 78.67% White, 4.60% African American, 1.25% Native American, 3.58% Asian, 2.37% Pacific Islander, 1.94% from some other races and 7.60% from two or more races. Hispanic or Latino people of any race were 6.94% of the population. 27.4% of residents were under the age of 18, 6.4% were under 5 years of age, and 7.9% were 65 and older. The gender makeup of the CDP was 35.7% female.

=== 2000 census ===
As of the 2000 census, there were 15,697 people, 4,990 households, and 4,166 families residing in the CDP. The population density was 1,640.8 inhabitants per square mile (633.5/km^{2}). There were 5,211 housing units at an average density of 544.7 per square mile (210.3/km^{2}). The racial makeup of the CDP was 80.57% White, 5.40% African American, 1.23% Native American, 4.05% Asian, 1.37% Pacific Islander, 1.48% from other races, and 5.89% from two or more races. Hispanic or Latino people of any race were 4.73% of the population.

There were 4,990 households, out of which 48.8% had children under the age of 18 living with them, 66.9% were married couples living together, 10.5% had a female householder with no husband present, and 16.5% were non-families. 12.1% of all households were made up of individuals, and 2.6% had someone living alone who was 65 years of age or older. The average household size was 3.12 and the average family size was 3.34.

In the CDP, the population was spread out, with 32.9% under the age of 18, 7.7% from 18 to 24, 34.0% from 25 to 44, 20.0% from 45 to 64, and 5.4% who were 65 years of age or older. The median age was 32 years. For every 100 females, there were 101.9 males. For every 100 females age 18 and over, there were 101.3 males.

The median income for a household in the CDP was $54,400, and the median income for a family was $57,004. Males had a median income of $39,242 versus $26,105 for females. The per capita income for the CDP was $19,547. About 5.5% of families and 7.8% of the population were below the poverty line, including 10.1% of those under age 18 and 0.4% of those age 65 or over.

== Education ==
Public schools in Elk Plain are part of the Bethel School District. Schools in or near Elk Plain include:

=== Elementary Schools ===
- Elk Plain School of Choice Elementary School
- Centennial Elementary School
- Shining Mountain Elementary School

=== Junior High School ===
- Bethel Junior High School

=== High School ===
- Bethel High School

=== Private school ===
- Bethel Baptist Christian School (grades K4-12)

=== Nearby colleges ===
- Pacific Lutheran University (Parkland)
- Colleges in Tacoma
- Colleges in Lakewood
- Colleges in Puyallup
- Colleges offering classes at Joint Base Lewis-McChord
