= House of Prayer Christian Church =

Religious organization based in Hinesville, Georgia

- Orientation: Pentecostal
- Leader: Rony Denis
- Headquarters: Hinesville, Georgia
- Founder: Rony Denis
- Origin: 2002; Baton Rouge, Louisiana
- Separated from: New Testament Christian Churches of America
- Congregations: 12 (in 2022)
- Other names: A Place of Prayer; Place of Help Prayer House; Place of Help Prayer Force

The House of Prayer Christian Church is a religious organization based in Hinesville, Georgia. The organization, described by one of its members as a Pentecostal church, was established by Rony Denis in 2004 in Baton Rouge, Louisiana. By 2022, the organization was operating 12 local churches, including its mother church in Hinesville, and multiple seminaries in several states.

Starting around the 2010s, multiple former members have accused the church of being a cult and have alleged a series of wrongdoings against the organization and its leaders. These allegations have included verbal abuse, manipulation, fraud, and forgery, among others. In 2020, a veterans' advocacy group submitted a letter to the United States Department of Veterans Affairs requesting that the department investigate the church for potential abuses regarding the G.I. Bill programs, accusing the church of defrauding veterans out of their educational benefits by offering courses without granting certificates of completion, among other charges. In one example, the advocacy group noted that one student had been enrolled in a House of Prayer's educational program for 12 years, completely draining his educational benefits without receiving a degree or certificate from the program.

In June 2022, the Federal Bureau of Investigation raided several church locations, and by November 2022, multiple states had barred House of Prayer educational programs from receiving G.I. Bill funding. In January 2023, the United States Department of Justice (DOJ) filed papers with the United States District Court for the Southern District of Georgia seeking the forfeiture of roughly $150,000 in funds owned by the church and accusing the organization of engaging in a "criminal scheme" to "defraud the United States of money" and "its military veterans of monetary educational benefits". The filing alleged that over 500 veterans were involved in the scheme, which involved roughly $22 million in government funds. In April 2024, the DOJ accused the church and several leaders of stonewalling their investigation efforts.

== History ==
=== Establishment ===
The House of Prayer Christian Church (HOPCC) was established in 2004 by Rony Denis, whose work in Christian ministry may date to at least 1989. (Note: A 2017 article in the Coastal Courier, a local newspaper based in Hinesville, Georgia, cites a former member of the House of Prayer Christian Church as having been a member of that church and "its affiliates" starting in 1989, but offers no more clarity regarding what is meant by this phrasing.) Denis had previously served as a minister at another Christian church, the New Testament Christian Churches of America, which had church locations nationwide, including in Hinesville, Georgia, and Graham, Washington. In 2003, Denis convinced 15 other ministers from New Testament to leave that church and join him in a new organization, which was officially established the following year. Denis founded the organization in Baton Rouge, Louisiana, but soon relocated HOPCC's headquarters to Hinesville, (Note: Concerning the location of the organization's principal church and headquarters, multiple sources state that the building is located in the 2500 block of Airport Road in Hinesville. However, at least one source states that the building is located in nearby Walthourville, Georgia, while another states that the building is "just outside of Hinesville city limits". According to several sources, the organization uses a Hinesville post office box number for the headquarters' mailing address, and its location anywhere in Liberty County would place the headquarters within the Hinesville metropolitan area.) where he had previously ministered with New Testament. According to reporting from the Savannah Morning News, HOPCC registered with the Georgia Secretary of State on May 18, 2004, and is officially owned by a "foreign nonprofit group" known as House of Prayer Christian Churches of America, Inc., which is a 501(c)(3) organization. Following HOPCC's establishment, several people who had been congregants of Denis's at New Testament followed him to his new organization. Regarding the theology of the HOPCC, in 2017 a member named Cesar Vargas stated that the church was Pentecostal, further saying, "We are what the Assemblies of God, Church of God and Methodists were 100 years ago".

By 2022, HOPCC operated 12 local churches across the country, as well as several seminaries. (Note: Sources vary on the exact number of seminaries that the organization was running in 2022, with an article in the Deseret News claiming five and an article in The Fayetteville Observer saying six. A 2022 article in The News Tribune lists seminaries operated by the organization in five different locations: Augusta, Georgia; Hinesville, Georgia; Fayetteville, North Carolina; Killeen, Texas; and Tacoma, Washington. An article in The Augusta Chronicle lists these locations in addition to a seminary in San Diego.) Of these churches, 11 were located near American military installations, including one in Killeen, Texas, located 4 miles (6.4 km) from Fort Hood, one in Tacoma, Washington, near Joint Base Lewis–McChord, and another in the Augusta metropolitan area near Fort Gordon. The organization's principal church and headquarters in Hinesville was located less than 8 mi (13 km) from Fort Stewart in Liberty County. On average, the typical membership at each of these churches was between 50 and 100 people, but the attendance would often double during sermons held by Denis, who several former members of the organization have described as a charismatic preacher. As of 2022, Denis reportedly lived in Augusta, owned three mansions, including one in Florida and two in Georgia, and at least two Rolls-Royce vehicles.

=== Accusations of wrongdoing by former members ===
Since at least the 2010s, several former members of the church have criticized the organization for alleged wrongdoings, with some calling House of Prayer a cult. (Note: Multiple sources have reported on former members referring to House of Prayer Christian Church as a "cult".) According to reporting from the Hinesville-based Coastal Courier newspaper, several former members have alleged that child abuse has occurred within the organization, and some former members have accused Denis of committing fraud and manipulating church members. According to the Courier, one former member who had followed Denis from New Testament to House of Prayer have claimed that he became "money hungry" at the new church. Former members have also alleged that Denis referred to himself as a deity and barred the church members' access to the Internet and certain electronic devices, such as cell phones. Additionally, according to some former members, Denis had control over who the church members' date and marry and claimed to have the ability to perform divorces, which one former member said he did to her marriage after she refused to give testimony. According to Arlen Bradeen, a former member and pastor with House of Prayer, Denis had initially agreed to allow local churches a large degree of autonomy, but employed a conference call system to directly communicate and preach to all churches, saying, "Someone could be preaching or singing a song and when the Polycom rang, you heard it through the PA system, and everybody had to sit and listen to Denis".

==== Allegations of targeting military personnel ====
Several former members have stated that the church often focused their recruitment efforts on members of the United States Armed Forces. One soldier stationed at Fort Stewart told The Augusta Chronicle that there had been a meeting at one of the barracks where soldiers were told that a nearby church was targeting military members, while a representative from Fort Gordon told the Chronicle in 2022 that they were aware that the organization was targeting military members on the base. The Chronicle also stated that there were allegations that some church members had snuck into the barracks at Fort Hood and threatened soldiers. In 2020, one former member stated that they had been recruited to the church at the welcome barracks of Fort Stewart by an E-5 rank sergeant of the United States Army. Former members describe the church's program of proselytizing to military members as "soul-winning".

According to a 2022 article from the Chronicle, military members were targeted primarily because of their steady income, propensity for obeying orders, and their geographic isolation from friends and family members while stationed at military bases, with one former church member who was active in the National Guard saying it was "almost like a predator/prey type scenario". That same former member said that church leaders requested information on the members income and demanded a 10 percent tithe, stating that withholding that amount would be "stealing from God". Military members were also required to sign over their reenlistment bonuses to the church, with one member stating that she also signed over her $400,000 military life insurance plan to the church, allowing them to receive the money in the event of her death.

==== Accusations of real estate wrongdoings ====
In a 2017 article in the Courier, reporter Patty Leon wrote that multiple former members have accused Denis of "real estate fraud and forgery" dating back to around 2004 or 2005. According to Ray Yorke, a former pastor at House of Prayer, Denis would often convince church members to buy houses and then turn over the properties to a property management company run by the church via a power of attorney. Former members stated that the homes were often used to generate income for the church through refinancing and that sometimes the properties were allowed to go into foreclosure, damaging the credit of the property owner. A former member of the church called the system a "real estate money factory" and stated that Denis had plans to create a rental agency, a construction company, and a mortgage department. A 2022 article in The Christian Post stated that the church's real estate dealings were "worth millions". According to Yorke, the church's affiliated property management company, called People Helping People, is blacklisted by Fort Lewis and is on the "off limits list" at several other military bases, including Fort Stewart.

=== 2017 Hinesville protests and town hall meeting ===
Between May 19 and 21, 2017, a group of about 20 or 30 former members of the church held a protest outside of the Hinesville location where they alleged that the organization was actually a cult that had engaged in wrongdoing, accusing House of Prayer of manipulating its members and abuse. According to a 2017 article in the Courier, the protests were probably planned to coincide with a nationwide gathering of church members from the other branches. During the protests, one former member said with a megaphone that Denis is a "false prophet".

A month later, on June 21, a town hall meeting in Hinesville was organized by a local activist for former church members to discuss the church. During the meeting, current church members confronted the former members and interrupted speeches, with the Courier reporting that the confrontations "nearly led to fistfights". Former members stated that the current members carried cell phones and had earpieces, leading them to believe that they were receiving instructions from church officials. During the meeting, Yorke accused Denis of being a fraud and accused the church of harassing former members. Leon of the Courier also reported that one former member stated during the meeting that Denis, during a church testimonial, had said that he had "lust after young kids". In her article covering the meeting, Leon noted that in 2016, the Hinesville Police Department had cooperated with the Department of Family and Children Services in investigating a child molestation allegation at a house owned by the church and allegedly occupied by Denis, his wife, and a daughter. Leon stated that no charges appeared to have been filed concerning the investigation. Following the meeting, a scuffle involving some shoving between former and current members occurred in a nearby parking lot, but did not escalate further.

Around the time of the protests and town hall meeting, the church began to use several different names to refer to itself, including "A Place of Prayer", "Place of Help Prayer House", and "Place of Help Prayer Force". Concerning the name changes, the activist who organized the town hall meeting said, "It looks like they are trying to hide by changing the name of all their churches".

=== 2020 Veterans Education Success letter ===
In August 2020, Veterans Education Success (VES), an advocacy group for veterans, submitted a letter to the United States Department of Veterans Affairs and the Georgia Veterans Service requesting that the government organizations investigate potential abuses by the church regarding G.I. Bill programs. Per the claims made in the letter, which VES submitted after interviewing 14 former and one current church member, House of Prayer had engaged in fraud against current and former military members by misleading members who had enrolled in educational classes through the church. VES alleged that veterans were charged higher rates for tuition than non-veterans and were misled by church officials regarding their education benefits. According to the letter, House of Prayer would keep veterans enrolled in educational programs that had constantly-changing rules for graduation until they had exhausted their military education benefits without receiving any form of certificate or degree. According to the advocacy group, no veteran that had enrolled in the church's education program had ever received a completion letter or certificate. In one case, a student had attended church classes for 12 years without graduation, completely draining their G.I. Bill education allowance in the process. Additionally, the church's seminaries accepted women, even though women were barred from becoming pastors in the church.

VES also alleged that House of Prayer sought to take money from veterans through VA loans and disability benefits. Per VES, military members in the church were requested to seek out disability assistance for nonexistent ailments. VES estimated that, in total, House of Prayer had received approximately $7 million in government funds through these programs, including $3.5 million received by the church's seminaries. VES alleged that in 2018 alone, House of Prayer had received roughly $700,000 in funds from the G.I. Bill program, and in 2020, the church's seminary in Tacoma had received $150,000 in G.I. Bill funds. The group also alleged that much of the money received by the church went directly to Denis. In addition to the accusations of financial wrongdoing, the VES letter also charged that the church operated like a cult and would intimidate members who were seeking to leave the organization.

=== 2022 FBI raids ===
On the morning of June 23, 2022, the Federal Bureau of Investigation (FBI) conducted raids on several House of Prayer facilities located near military bases, including the churches located near Fort Bragg, Fort Gordon, Fort Hood, Fort Stewart, and Joint Base Lewis–McChord, and one in California. At many of these locations, local law enforcement, including police departments and sheriff's offices, assisted the FBI. According to a spokesperson for the FBI, the bureau had conducted a "court authorized law enforcement activity", which most likely means that they had executed a search warrant. The FBI noted that no arrests were made, but gave no reason for the raids. Following the raid, a spokesperson for Fort Stewart said that the church might be added to a list of businesses that soldiers are notified to be wary of. In July 2022, William Hubbard, a vice president at VES, testified before the United States House Committee on Veterans' Affairs regarding the recent raids on House of Prayer and their alleged misconduct as evidence of more needed oversight of G.I. Bill programs. That same month, the church's property in Hinesville was seized by the government of the United States after federal agents received warrants from the United States District Court for the Southern District of Georgia. By November 2022, regulatory agencies in several states, including Georgia, North Carolina, Texas, and Washington, had barred educational organizations associated with House of Prayer from receiving any funding from G.I. Bill programs.

=== 2023–2024 actions by the Department of Justice ===
On January 6, 2023, the United States Department of Justice (DOJ) submitted a court filing with the Southern District of Georgia seeking the asset forfeiture of roughly $150,000 from six bank accounts at First Citizens Bank and South Georgia Bank that were associated with House of Prayer. In the filing, the DOJ accused House of Prayer of operating a "criminal scheme" to "defraud the United States of money" and "its military veterans of monetary educational benefits" through its subsidiary, House of Prayer Bible Seminaries (HOPBS). According to the filing, between January 2013 and February 2020, over 300 veterans were enrolled in educational programs hosted by the church. With these programs, House of Prayer falsified records, misled students, denied or delayed granting students documentation to show their progress and completion of courses, and changed students' courses and classes without their consent, in addition to other charges. According to the DOJ, "Had HOPBS related truthful and accurate information, ... HOPBS would not have been authorized to operate in the state of Georgia and, as a result, would not have been certified to receive Post-9/11 GI Bill program benefits and would not have received money from the VA".

Specific charges alleged by the DOJ against House of Prayer included conspiracy to defraud the United States, embezzlement of public funds, money laundering, wire fraud, among other offenses. According to reporting from the Chronicle, the department alleged that House of Prayer "used 20 financial institutions and 80 bank accounts" as part of the alleged money laundering scheme. In total, the department alleged that a total of 514 veterans were affected, with the VA paying a total of roughly $22 million to the church's education subsidiary between 2013 and 2022. Denis and nine other church leaders were explicitly mentioned in the court filings, though at the time, no individual criminal charges had been filed.

In a filing on April 4, 2024, after House of Prayer failed to submit documents to the DOJ by a September 2023 deadline, DOJ prosecutors accused the church of stonewalling their investigation by refusing to produce requested documentation. In response, House of Prayer stated that they could withhold documents based on their rights enumerated in the Fifth Amendment to the United States Constitution, though federal prosecutors have dismissed this argument. The federal prosecutors' filing requests that the religious organization and three church leaders be held in contempt of court and fined until the requested documentation is produced.
