= Kapowsin, Washington =

Kapowsin
- census-designated place (CDP)
- Location within the state of Washington
- Coordinates: 46°58′02″N 122°14′22″W
- Country: United States
- State: Washington
- County: Pierce
- Elevation: 581 ft (177 m)

Population (2020)
  - Total: 372
- Time zone: UTC-8 (Pacific (PST))
  - Summer (DST): UTC-7 (PDT)
- GNIS feature ID: 2584985

Kapowsin /kəˈpaʊ.ə.sɪn/ is a census-designated place located approximately 25 miles (38 kilometers) southeast of Tacoma in Pierce County, Washington, United States. The 2020 Census placed the population at 372.

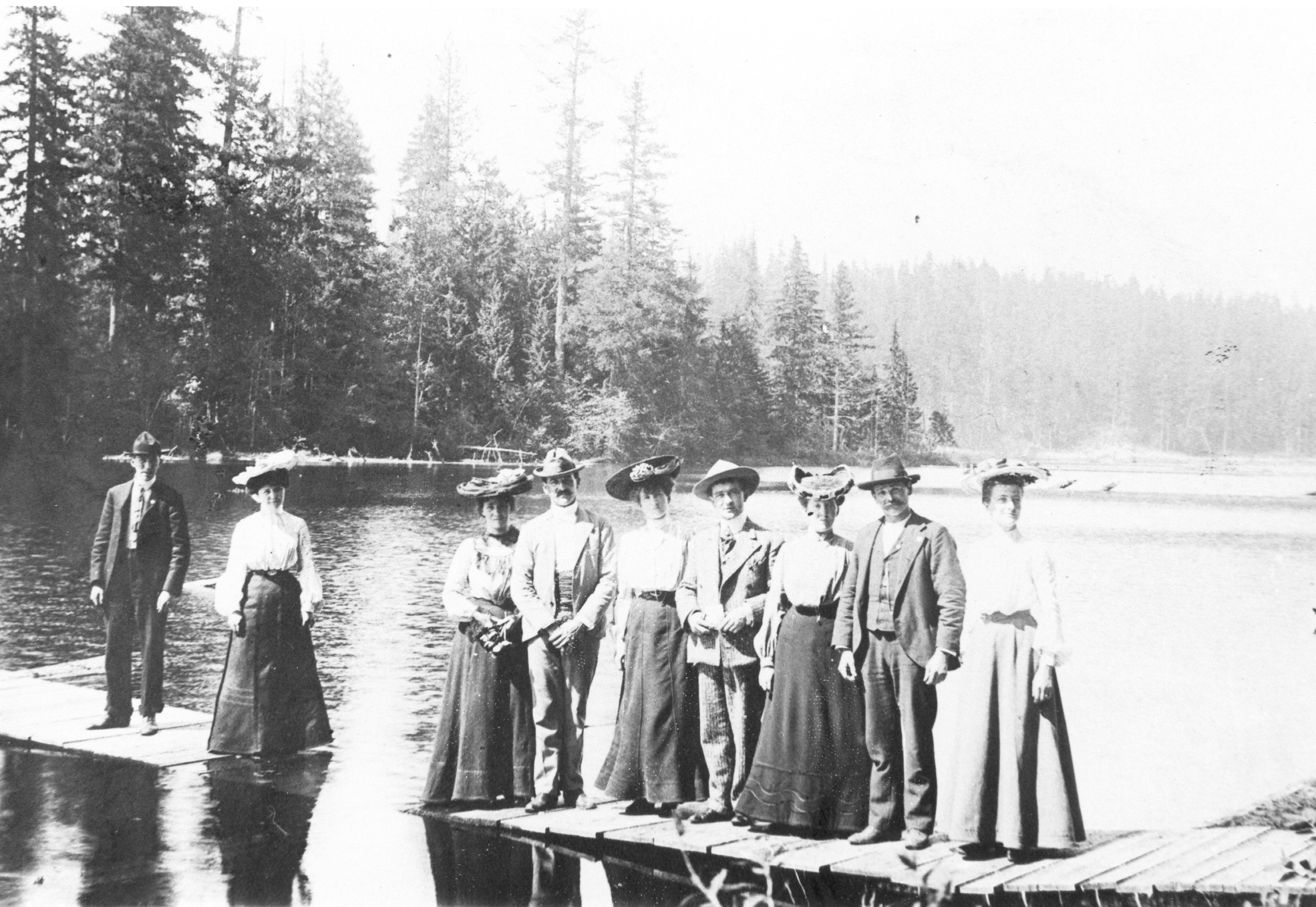
The boardwalk used by people in Kapowsin to walk over to the woods to work or to get to the dance hall.

Kapowsin, originally Kapousen Precinct, was named for its shallow lake. The ancient glacial drainage channel provides a nearly level connection between the Puyallup and Nisqually Rivers, and formed a natural travel route at the base of the Cascade foothills. Chief Kapowsin was a fictional leader with an iron fist who lived on the lake's shores, a folklore told by the Nisqually tribe that lived in the nearby village of bacálabc (or bišál; southwest of Eatonville) prior to the area being settled in 1888.

Kapowsin was founded in 1901 when the Kapowsin Lumber Company built a sawmill at the community's present site. Located on the north end of Lake Kapowsin, the community was a thriving lumber town in the early part of the 20th century, with a high school, shops, and trades, and a population of about 10,000. After a decline in the timber industry, the town diminished in size into a neighborhood center, with a store, tavern, post office (US ZIP code 98344), fire station and grange hall. Kapowsin High School was abandoned in 1949 after being damaged in an earthquake. The 2010 Census placed the population at 333.

Kapowsin is located partially in the Bethel School District and partially in the Eatonville School District, and Kapowsin Elementary School is located nearby. Secondary students attend Frontier Junior High and Graham-Kapowsin High School, which opened in 2005. Tacoma Rail's freight line to Morton, Washington, runs through the town.

== Demographics ==
Historical population
Census	Pop.	Note	%±
2010	333		—
2020	372		11.7%
U.S. Decennial Census; 2000 2010

Kapowsin first appeared as a census designated place in the 2010 U.S. census.

=== Racial and ethnic composition ===
Kapowsin CDP, Washington – Racial and ethnic composition Note: the US Census treats Hispanic/Latino as an ethnic category. This table excludes Latinos from the racial categories and assigns them to a separate category. Hispanics/Latinos may be of any race.
Race / Ethnicity (NH = Non-Hispanic)	Pop 2010	Pop 2020	% 2010	% 2020
White alone (NH)	289	320	86.79%	86.02%
Black or African American alone (NH)	1	8	0.30%	2.15%
Native American or Alaska Native alone (NH)	5	2	1.50%	0.54%
Asian alone (NH)	4	4	1.20%	1.08%
Native Hawaiian or Pacific Islander alone (NH)	0	0	0.00%	0.00%
Other race alone (NH)	0	0	0.00%	0.00%
Mixed race or Multiracial (NH)	16	26	4.80%	6.99%
Hispanic or Latino (any race)	18	12	5.41%	3.23%
Total	333	372	100.00%	100.00%
