= Caesar Rayford =

American football player (born 1986)

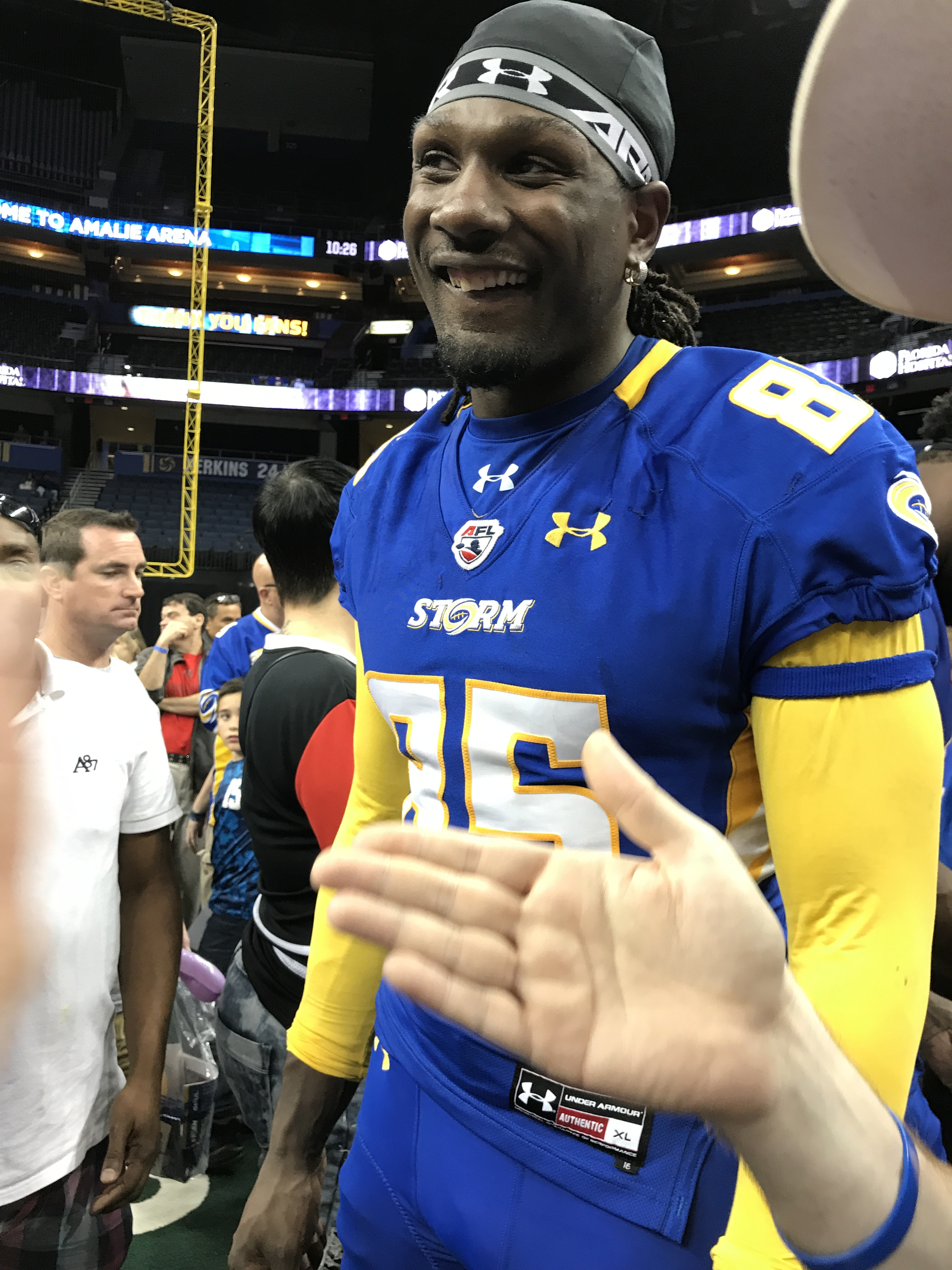
- Rayford with the Tampa Bay Storm in 2017

No. 85, 95
- Positions: Linebacker, defensive end

Personal information
- Born: March 4, 1986 (age 40); Fayetteville, North Carolina, U.S.
- Listed height: 6 ft 7 in (2.01 m)
- Listed weight: 272 lb (123 kg)

Career information
- High school: Bethel (Spanaway, Washington)
- College: Washington
- NFL draft: 2008: undrafted

Career history

Playing
- BC Lions (2008)*; Spokane Shock (2009); BC Lions (2009); Utah Blaze (2010–2013); Indianapolis Colts (2013)*; Dallas Cowboys (2013–2014); Calgary Stampeders (2014); Montreal Alouettes (2014); Jacksonville Sharks (2015); Minnesota Vikings (2015)*; Los Angeles Kiss (2016); Saskatchewan Roughriders (2016)*; Tampa Bay Storm (2017)
- * Offseason or practice squad member only

Coaching
- Atlantic City Blackjacks (2019) Defensive line & linebackers coach

Awards and highlights
- First-team All-Arena (2011)

Career NFL statistics
- Games played: 7
- Total tackles: 5
- Stats at Pro Football Reference

Career AFL statistics
- Total tackles: 90
- Sacks: 30
- Forced fumbles: 10
- Pass deflections: 19
- Interceptions: 3
- Stats at ArenaFan.com
- Stats at CFL.ca (archive)

Caesar Rayford (born March 4, 1986) is an American former professional football player who was a defensive end for the Dallas Cowboys of the National Football League (NFL). He played college football for the Washington Huskies. Rayford also was a member of the BC Lions, Spokane Shock, Utah Blaze, Indianapolis Colts, Calgary Stampeders, Montreal Alouettes, Jacksonville Sharks, Minnesota Vikings, Los Angeles Kiss, Saskatchewan Roughriders, and Tampa Bay Storm.

== Early life ==
Rayford attended Bethel High School in Spanaway, Washington. As a senior, he tallied 47 tackles, 8 sacks and 3 blocked field goals. He received All-SPSL South and Tacoma News Tribune's second-team All-area honors.

College recruiting
| Name | Hometown | School | Height | Weight | 40^{‡} | Commit date |
|---|---|---|---|---|---|---|
| Caesar Rayford; DE/TE | Spanaway, Washington | Bethel High School | 6 ft 7 in (2.01 m) | 225 lb (102 kg) | 4.56 | Jan 11, 2004 |
| Caesar Rayford; DE/TE | Recruit ratings: Scout: Rivals: | | | | | |
Overall recruit ranking: Scout: 30 (TE) Rivals: -- (DE), -- (WA)
‡ Refers to 40-yard dash; Note: In many cases, Scout, Rivals, 247Sports, On3, and ESPN may conflict in their listings of height, weight and 40 time.; In these cases, the average was taken. ESPN grades are on a 100-point scale.; Sources: "Washington Football Commitment List". Rivals.; "Washington College Football Recruiting Commits". Scout.; "Scout.com Team Recruiting Rankings". Scout.; "2004 Team Ranking". Rivals.com.

== College career ==
Rayford accepted a football scholarship from the University of Washington on January 11, 2004. He chose the Huskies over scholarship offers from Oregon and UCLA. He was originally redshirted as a true freshman, but had to play the last 6 games of the season because of injuries suffered on the defensive line.

As a sophomore, he appeared in 9 games, making 2 tackles and a half sack. As a junior, he appeared in 9 games and made one tackle. As a senior, he appeared in 13 games, registering career-highs with 10 tackles and 4 sacks.

He played a total of 35 career games mainly as a backup defensive end, finishing with 13 tackles (7 solo), 5.5 sacks, 5.5 tackles for loss, 4 pass breakups, one forced fumble and one blocked kick.

== Professional career ==
=== BC Lions (first stint) ===
Rayford declared for the 2008 NFL draft, but was not selected and began his career as an undrafted free agent. He was signed by the BC Lions of the Canadian Football League after having a free agent workout. He spent all of the season on the practice squad.

He was released before the start of the season on June 25, 2009.

=== Spokane Shock ===
On July 7, 2009, Rayford joined the Spokane Shock of the AF2 league. He appeared in 3 games (2 starts), collecting 2 tackles (2 for loss), one sack and two pass breakups. He was a part of the ArenaCup X Championship team.

=== BC Lions (second stint) ===
On November 12, 2009, the BC Lions added Rayford to the practice roster. He was promoted to the active roster on November 13. He played in two playoff games as a backup defensive end, making one tackle. He wasn't re-signed after the season.

=== Utah Blaze ===
In 2010, he signed with the Utah Blaze of the Arena Football League. He recorded 16 tackles, 5 sacks, 2 interceptions (returned for 2 touchdowns), 4 pass breakups, 2 forced fumbles and 2 fumble recoveries.

In 2011, he started 17 out of 18 games, posting 31 tackles, 10 sacks (tied for sixth in the league), 12 tackles for loss (fourth in the league), 7 passes defensed, 3 forced fumbles and 4 fumble recoveries. He also blocked an AFL single-season record five kicks.

In 2012, the Blaze's defensive line was coined "Sack Lake City" due to the tremendous amount of pressure and sacks they applied to quarterbacks. In a game against the Iowa Barnstormers, the Blaze recorded a league record 11 sacks in one game, led by the combination of Rayford and Mike Lewis with 3.5 sacks each. He finished with 18 starts, 21 tackles (7 for loss), 7.5 sacks, 3 pass breakups, one forced fumble and one blocked kick.

In 2013, he registered 13 tackles, 6 sacks, 2 pass breakups, 4 forced fumbles, one fumble recovery and 2 blocked kicks. He finished with 68 tackles (26.5 for loss), 22.5 sacks, 16 passes defensed, 7 forced fumbles, 7 fumble recoveries, 2 interceptions returned for touchdowns and 6 blocked kicks.

=== Indianapolis Colts ===
On May 23, 2013, Rayford signed as a free agent with the Indianapolis Colts to play as an outside linebacker on the team's 3-4 defense.

=== Dallas Cowboys ===
On September 3, 2013, the Dallas Cowboys acquired him from the Colts after he had a notable preseason, in exchange of a seventh round draft choice (#244-Trenton Brown). He played in 7 games, before being cut on November 12 and signed to the practice squad. He was released by the team on August 30, 2014.

=== Calgary Stampeders ===
Rayford was signed to the Calgary Stampeders' practice roster on September 23, 2014. He was released by the Stampeders on September 26, 2014.

=== Montreal Alouettes ===
Rayford was signed to the Montreal Alouettes' practice roster on October 27, 2014. He was promoted to the active roster on November 1. He was released by the Alouettes on November 24.

=== Jacksonville Sharks ===
Rayford was acquired by the Jacksonville Sharks of the Arena Football League through the Off-Season Assignment Process in 2013 and was activated from the Other League Exempt list on January 6, 2015. He spent the entire 2014 season on the Other League Exempt list. He was activated by the Sharks on January 6, 2015.

=== Minnesota Vikings ===
On April 2, 2015, he was signed as a free agent by the Minnesota Vikings. He was cut on August 30.

=== Los Angeles KISS ===
On November 18, 2015, he was assigned to the Los Angeles KISS of the Arena Football League. He tallied 3 tackles and one pass defensed. On January 7, 2016, he was placed on the Other League Exempt list.

=== Saskatchewan Roughriders ===
On January 7, 2016, Rayford signed with the Saskatchewan Roughriders. He was released on June 12.

=== Tampa Bay Storm ===
On October 14, 2016, Rayford was selected by the Tampa Bay Storm of the Arena Football League during the dispersal draft. He had 8 tackles, 1.5 sacks, 2 passes defensed, one forced fumble, one blocked kick and one interception returned for a touchdown. The franchise folded in December 2017.

== Personal life ==
His uncle Otis Sistrunk was a defensive tackle for the Oakland Raiders. On January 31, 2019, he was named the defensive line and linebackers coach for the Arena Football League expansion team Atlantic City Blackjacks.
