= Foster Sarell =

American football player (born 1998)

No. 61 – San Francisco 49ers
- Position: Offensive tackle
- Roster status: Practice squad

Personal information
- Born: August 28, 1998 (age 28); Tacoma, Washington, U.S.
- Listed height: 6 ft 6 in (1.98 m)
- Listed weight: 322 lb (146 kg)

Career information
- High school: Graham-Kapowsin (Graham, Washington)
- College: Stanford (2017–2020)
- NFL draft: 2021: undrafted

Career history
- Baltimore Ravens (2021)*; New York Giants (2021)*; Los Angeles Chargers (2021–2024); Washington Commanders (2025)*; Los Angeles Chargers (2025); Washington Commanders (2026)*; Denver Broncos (2026)*; San Francisco 49ers (2026–present)*
- * Offseason or practice squad member only

Career NFL statistics as of 2025
- Games played: 41
- Games started: 4
- Stats at Pro Football Reference

Foster Dane Sarell (born August 28, 1998) is an American professional football offensive tackle for the San Francisco 49ers of the National Football League (NFL). He played college football for the Stanford Cardinal and signed with the Baltimore Ravens as an undrafted free agent in 2021. Sarell has also been a member of the New York Giants, Los Angeles Chargers, Washington Commanders, and Denver Broncos.

== Early life ==
Sarell was born on August 28, 1998, in Tacoma, Washington. He attended Graham-Kapowsin High School, where he earned numerous accolades in football. He was thrice named the team's lineman of the year, was three times all-area, three times all-state, three times all-league, three times league offensive lineman of the year, and three times All-American. He was league MVP in 2016 and was named first-team USA Today All-USA that season. Sarell, a five-star recruit, was widely ranked the top high school player in the state and was listed by some sources as high as number two nationally. He additionally participated in track and field and basketball, while earning the High GPA Achievement Award in all four years at the school.

== College career ==
After graduating from high school, Sarell committed to Stanford to play college football, becoming one of the school's highest rated recruits ever. Sarell was joined by two other five star prospects, quarterback Davis Mills and offensive lineman Walker Little. As a true freshman in 2017, he played 14 games as a backup offensive lineman. As a sophomore in 2018, Sarell appeared in two games before suffering an injury and played in only one afterwards, leading him to redshirt for the season. He appeared in 11 games, each as a starter, in the 2019 season, being named to the All-Pac-10 Conference team as an honorable mention after the year ended. As a senior in 2020, he started all six games in a season shortened by COVID-19. Although Sarell had an extra year of eligibility in 2021, he decided to declare for the NFL draft rather than return for a fifth season.

== Professional career ==
Pre-draft measurables
Height	Weight	Arm length	Hand span	Wingspan	40-yard dash	10-yard split	20-yard split	20-yard shuttle	Three-cone drill	Vertical jump	Broad jump	Bench press
6 ft 6 1/2 in (1.99 m)	318 lb (144 kg)	33 3/8 in (0.85 m)	9 3/4 in (0.25 m)	6 ft 8 1/4 in (2.04 m)	5.58 s	1.89 s	3.22 s	4.69 s	7.63 s	27.0 in (0.69 m)	8 ft 2 in (2.49 m)	29 reps
All values from Pro Day

=== Baltimore Ravens ===
After going unselected in the 2021 NFL draft, Sarell was signed by the Baltimore Ravens as an undrafted free agent. He was waived at the final roster cuts, on August 31. Sarell returned to the Ravens on September 16, being signed to the team's practice squad. However, he was released five days later.

=== New York Giants ===
On September 1, 2021, one day after being released from the Baltimore practice squad, Sarell joined the New York Giants practice squad. After spending about a week there, he was released on September 28.

=== Los Angeles Chargers ===
Later, on October 14, 2021, he was signed by the Los Angeles Chargers as a practice squad member. Sarell spent the whole season there, not appearing in a game, and was signed to a future contract on January 11, 2022. At the final roster cuts in 2022, on August 30, he was released, after which he was re-signed to the practice squad. He was promoted to the active roster for their week six game against the Denver Broncos, and made his NFL debut in the 19–16 win, appearing on five special teams snaps. He was elevated again for their game against the San Francisco 49ers in week ten, and recorded his first career start in the 16–22 loss, appearing on every offensive snap while allowing one sack. He was signed to the active roster on November 26. Sarell finished the season with seven regular season games played, three as a starter, in addition to one playoff game.

=== Washington Commanders ===
On March 18, 2025, Sarell signed a one-year contract with the Washington Commanders. He was released by the Commanders on August 27.

=== Los Angeles Chargers (second stint) ===
On August 28, 2025, Sarell was signed to the Los Angeles Chargers' practice squad. He was signed to the active roster on October 1. Sarell was waived by the Chargers on November 29, and re-signed to the practice squad.

=== Washington Commanders (second stint) ===
On March 24, 2026, Sarell signed with the Washington Commanders. He was released by the Commanders on August 25.

=== Denver Broncos ===
On August 26, 2026, Sarell was signed by the Denver Broncos. On August 30, he was released by the Broncos.

=== San Francisco 49ers ===
On September 1, 2026, Sarell signed with the San Francisco 49ers' practice squad.

== Personal life ==
Sarell is of partial Korean descent.
