= Vega Ioane =

American football player (born 2004)

No. 71 – Baltimore Ravens
- Position: Guard
- Roster status: Active

Personal information
- Born: April 17, 2004 (age 22); American Samoa
- Listed height: 6 ft 4 in (1.93 m)
- Listed weight: 326 lb (148 kg)

Career information
- High school: Graham-Kapowsin (Graham, Washington, U.S.)
- College: Penn State (2022–2025)
- NFL draft: 2026: 1st round, 14th overall pick

Career history
- Baltimore Ravens (2026–present)

Awards and highlights
- First-team All-American (2025); First-team All-Big Ten (2025); Second-team All-Big Ten (2024)

Career NFL statistics as of Week 4, 2026
- Games played: 4
- Games started: 4
- Stats at Pro Football Reference

Olaivavega Ioane (/joʊˈɑːnɛ/ yoh-AH-neh; born April 17, 2004) is an American professional football guard for the Baltimore Ravens of the National Football League (NFL). He played college football for the Penn State Nittany Lions and was selected by the Ravens in the first round of the 2026 NFL draft.

== Early life ==
Ioane was born on the islands of American Samoa, one of eight siblings, he and his family moved to Graham, Washington. He attended Graham-Kapowsin High School, where he played football as an offensive lineman, making the varsity team as a freshman before becoming a starter as a sophomore. Ioane had not played football until entering Graham-Kapowsin. He was a first-team All-South Puget Sound League (SPSL) selection and as a senior was chosen second-team All-American by MaxPreps after helping his team to a 15–0 record and the state championship. A three-star prospect, Ioane was ranked the eighth-best player in the state and the 18th-best interior offensive lineman nationally by 247Sports. He initially committed to play college football for the Washington Huskies before de-committing and signing with the Penn State Nittany Lions.

== College career ==
Ioane, an offensive guard, played in four games for Penn State in 2022 while redshirting.

As a redshirt freshman in 2023, Ioane played in all 13 games and started five, being selected honorable mention All-Big Ten Conference by the media.

Ioane became a full-time starter in 2024, starting all 16 games while being selected second-team All-Big Ten.

== Professional career ==
Pre-draft measurables
Height	Weight	Arm length	Hand span	Wingspan	Vertical jump	Broad jump
6 ft 4 1/4 in (1.94 m)	320 lb (145 kg)	32 3/4 in (0.83 m)	10 1/2 in (0.27 m)	6 ft 8 5/8 in (2.05 m)	31.5 in (0.80 m)	8 ft 8 in (2.64 m)
All values from NFL Combine

Ioane was selected by the Baltimore Ravens in the first round (14th overall) of the 2026 NFL draft.
