= Place of worship (disambiguation) =

A place of worship is a specially designed structure or space where individuals or a group perform acts of devotion, veneration, or religious study. A building constructed or used for these purposes is a house of worship or house of prayer.

They may also refer to

- Places of Worship (album) by Arve Henriksen
- House of Prayer (denomination) of Christianity
- House of Worship (album) by Twila Paris
- House of Prayer Christian Church, the Pentecostal organization
