= New Testament Christian Churches of America =

Christian denomination

New Testament Christian Churches of America, Incorporated
- Classification: Pentecostal
- Orientation: Pentecostal
- Polity: Episcopal
- Leader: Joseph Olson (chairman); Michael Kekel (CEO)
- Distinct fellowships: None
- Associations: None
- Region: Worldwide, usually adjacent to U.S. military bases
- Headquarters: Graham, Washington, USA
- Founder: Rodger W. Davis
- Origin: October 1969; St. Louis, Missouri
- Separated from: Pentecostal Church of God
- Separations: House of Prayer Christian Churches
- Missionaries: Philippines

New Testament Christian Churches of America (NTCC) is a Pentecostal, Evangelical, Trinitarian, Fundamentalist denomination of about 3,000 members in approximately 100 individual churches internationally, headquartered in Graham, Washington in the United States. It was founded in 1969 by former Pentecostal Church of God minister Rodger Wilson Davis (1929-2014). The NTCC proselytizing strategy targets military bases, specifically overseas. The NTCC does not provide financial statements and its finances are often cash-based.

== History ==
Incorporated in 1969 in St. Louis, Missouri as the New Testament Church of God (NTCG), the NTCC's founder and original pastor was Pentecostal Church of God minister Rodger Wilson Davis. For the first five years of its existence, NTCG was affiliated with the Independent Pentecostal, or Free, Holiness movement. The NTCG leadership eventually severed their ties with all outside churches, ministers, and ministries. They also distanced themselves from other Christian denominations by requiring that only those who had graduated from their own seminary could minister in their churches, and that their pastors could not maintain positions in any non-NTCG churches. The NTCG seminary was founded by Davis soon after he left the Pentecostal Church of God in 1969, and was incorporated in St. Louis as the Midwestern Bible Institute. The institute was later known as New Testament Christian (NTC) College, and is currently known as New Testament Christian Seminary.

In 1984, NTCG moved its denominational headquarters from St. Louis to Graham, Washington; the New Testament Christian Seminary followed suit in 1987. Also in 1987, NTCG changed its name to the New Testament Christian Churches of America, Incorporated.

== Proselytizing ==
As an evangelical church, the NTCC believes the Bible to be the pure word of God and the church's mission to change the nature of humanity by spreading the Gospel. Reporter Bruce Smith, writing in The Dispatch: The Independent Voice of South Pierce County, Washington, wrote that NTCC focuses its proselytizing efforts on United States Military bases, especially those outside the United States, "where single, lonely American soldiers need something more than honky-tonks and bars." Associate pastor Phillip Kinson told The Dispatch that their military evangelism works to "provide a home-away-from-home, and get them out of those filthy, evil barracks." NTCC sponsors its seminary graduates as missionaries in countries such as Germany and the Philippines. Teams of church volunteers and lay pastors go door-to-door inviting local residents to attend one of the five services held each week at the Graham NTCC. The evangelism teams are instructed to avoid malls because they "respect the privacy of business owners," according to Kinson.

The monthly NTCC-published magazine, Trumpet, contains ministry reports, Bible lessons and other columns written by different authors, predominantly from within NTCC.

== Constituency and facilities ==
While the church's board has not revealed financial or population statistics for NTCC, The Dispatch estimates approximately 105 NTCC churches with 5,000 members worldwide. NTCC's official website states it operates churches in Germany, Okinawa Japan, Panama, the Philippines, and the Republic of Korea; a total of 6 churches overseas. NTCC has an estimated 1,500 – 5,000 members and about 93 churches in the United States. According to Pastor Mike Kekel, attendance at the Graham NTCC numbers 700–800 for Sunday services. Membership is racially diverse, with about 40% of the congregants being black and others being from Asian or Hispanic backgrounds.

NTCC owns campground facilities in Santa Fe, Missouri, where ministerial meetings are held. The church also operates 12 residence facilities for servicemen near American military bases; most of them are located in Germany, and the Republic of Korea, the United States, England, and Japan. For a fee, these residential facilities provide unmarried soldiers a home-style alternative to barracks life.

NTCC runs the unaccredited New Testament Christian Seminary. More than 75 percent of New Testament Christian Seminary alumni are former members of the military, or spouses of former military members.

== Cult accusations and cult-like practices ==
The NTCC is an insular organization with dozens of former members of NTCC, including many former ministers, stating that the NTCC is a cult. According to the Dispatch, church services are used to bully and humiliate members, whose perceived sins are cited during sermons. The Dispatch further states there is rigid control of the relations between men and women, especially in the context of courtship. According to the Dispatch report, when members leave NTCC, current members are not instructed to shun them.

Also according to The Dispatch report, sports are discouraged at NTCC because members are expected to spend their time serving God; simple social gatherings such as birthday parties are also restricted. Members are discouraged to watch television, referred to as "Devil-vision" by church leaders." Women are not allowed to wear make-up, wear anything other than dresses and are forbidden to cut their hair. Women are further prohibited from holding jobs if they are married. Even if ordained at NTCC's Bible seminary, women are not allowed to run a ministry.

"Many ex-members describe a system whereby a young man wanting to date a woman would first have to ask permission of Rev. Davis during a public fellowship service. If Davis approved, he would then move to the women's section and ask the young woman if she would like to court the man. If she concurred, then the couple could "sit along the wall" in pre-arranged chairs and chat. In addition, they would be forbidden to meet outside of this time, although they eventually would be permitted to go on dates with a chaperone."

— Bruce Smith, The Dispatch,

The NTCC ministerial leadership arranges engagements of teenage girls to much older ministerial students, many of whom are in their twenties. Divorce is encouraged when one of the marriage partners leaves the church.

== Finances and financial distribution ==
NTCC members are expected to give 10% of their income to the NTCC and to give "till it hurts" in special collections for missionary programs. Writing for the Pierce County Dispatch, reporter Bruce Smith called the NTCC financial system "murky and mysterious." It is unclear how much money NTCC generates, and top NTCC officials such as associate pastor Phil Kinson have refused to divulge this information. Kinson also refused to say how much money he receives as pastor of the Graham church. However, Gregory Shunk, a former NTCC minister who oversaw the three Korean ministries, estimates that NTCC generates up to $6 million per year for the central church leadership. NTCC does not provide financial statements, and it does not belong to the Evangelical Council for Financial Accountability. The NTCC relies heavily on a "cash only" system for taking donations. Former ministers and Bible students report that tithes, dormitory fees, tuition, rent and utilities, were all paid in cash to the NTCC.

All local churches are required to send ten percent of all tithes to the leadership in Graham. Expenses to the leadership, however, are minimal since congregations are expected to support themselves. Pastors are also expected to maintain full-time work in addition to their ministerial duties, and also tithe to Graham. Ministers receive no finances from the central church coffers to help build their ministries, except for loans to buy land and building materials for new churches. They are expected to repay these loans even though the NTCC organizational office holds the titles to church properties. Local churches are expected to pay rent to the NTCC on their facilities as well, even though they financed them to begin with. The Dispatch also found that, whenever a pastor leaves a church, the NTCC absorbs the local escrow account, which may be tens of thousands of dollars, leaving the new minister with no funds. Ministers and their families are rotated out and shuffled from place to place frequently, seldom remaining at servicemen's works for longer than two years at a time.

Up to $100,000 a year is raised for the field missions; however, only $300 of this total is given to each of the field missions per month (or about $43,000 yearly for all 12 missions combined). Many ministers of field missions report that they live in poverty. Other reports show the amount of money given the field missions is even less.

NTCC founder Rodger Wilson Davis reportedly lived in a million-dollar home in Graham that is registered with Pierce County as owned by the NTCC. In February 2004, NTCC gave Davis' son-in-law (Kekel) a 39-acre (160,000 m^{2}) parcel of land next to the NTCC campus in Graham. According to county records, Kekel recently filed an application to build a subdivision of eight lots on this site.
