= Challenger Secondary School =

Public school in Spanaway, Washington, United States

Coordinates: 47°05′33″N 122°25′47″W

- Spanaway, Washington; United States

Information
- Type: Public secondary
- School district: Bethel School District
- Principal: Jeffrey Johnson
- Staff: 19.60 (FTE)
- Grades: 9–12
- Enrollment: 366 (2023–2024)
- Student to teacher ratio: 18.67
- Color(s): Black and Red
- Mascot: Raven
- Website: chs.bethelsd.org

Challenger High School is a public school in Spanaway, Washington. The school serves grades 9–12 and graduates 100 to 130 students each year. To enroll, students must meet certain requirements, and unlike other high schools in the district, a normal school day at Challenger is 3 hours long. Students have 4 classes and are trusted to have done four hours of homework each night.

Challenger is a part of Bethel School District.
