= Bethel School District v. Fraser =

- Supreme Court of the United States

Argued March 3, 1986 Decided July 7, 1986
- Full case name: Bethel School District No. 403 v. Matthew N. Fraser, a Minor, et al.
- Citations: 478 U.S. 675 (more) 106 S. Ct. 3159; 92 L. Ed. 2d 549; 1986 U.S. LEXIS 139; 54 U.S.L.W. 5054
- Argument: Oral argument

Case history
- Prior: Judgment for plaintiff; affirmed, 755 F.2d 1356 (9th Cir. 1985); cert. granted, 474 U.S. 814 (1985).

Holding
- The First Amendment, as applied through the Fourteenth, permits a public school to punish a student for giving a lewd and indecent, even if not obscene, speech at a school assembly. Ninth Circuit reversed and remanded.

Court membership
- Chief Justice Warren E. Burger Associate Justices William J. Brennan Jr. · Byron White; Thurgood Marshall · Harry Blackmun; Lewis F. Powell Jr. · William Rehnquist; John P. Stevens · Sandra Day O'Connor

Case opinions
- Majority: Burger, joined by White, Powell, Rehnquist, O'Connor
- Concurrence: Brennan (in judgment)
- Concurrence: Blackmun (in result)
- Dissent: Marshall
- Dissent: Stevens

Laws applied
- U.S. Const. amends. I, XIV; 42 U.S.C. § 1983

Bethel School District v. Fraser, 478 U.S. 675 (1986), is a landmark decision of the Supreme Court of the United States in which the Court upheld the suspension of a high school student who delivered a sexually suggestive speech at a school assembly. The case involved free speech in public schools.

On April 26, 1983, student Matthew Fraser was suspended from Bethel High School in Pierce County, Washington after he gave a speech including sexual innuendo while nominating a classmate for a student council position at a school assembly. Believing his speech to be inappropriate and vulgar, the school's administration suspended Fraser for three days and barred him from speaking at graduation. After unsuccessfully appealing his punishment through the school's grievance procedures, Fraser filed a lawsuit against the school board, claiming the suspension violated his right to free speech under the First Amendment to the U.S. Constitution.

The United States District Court and Ninth Circuit Court of Appeals both sided with Fraser. On appeal to the U.S. Supreme Court, a 7–2 majority held that his suspension did not violate the First Amendment. Writing for the majority, Chief Justice Warren Burger found that schools have the right to suppress student speech that is considered lewd or indecent, even if not obscene, in the interest of preserving a safe educational environment.

== Background ==
=== Prior case law ===
The First Amendment to the United States Constitution protects the freedom of speech with several narrow exceptions that the Supreme Court has defined over time. In Tinker v. Des Moines Independent Community School District (1969), the Court held that speech made by students in public schools is protected by the First Amendment unless the speech causes a "substantial disruption" to the learning environment.

=== Facts of the case ===
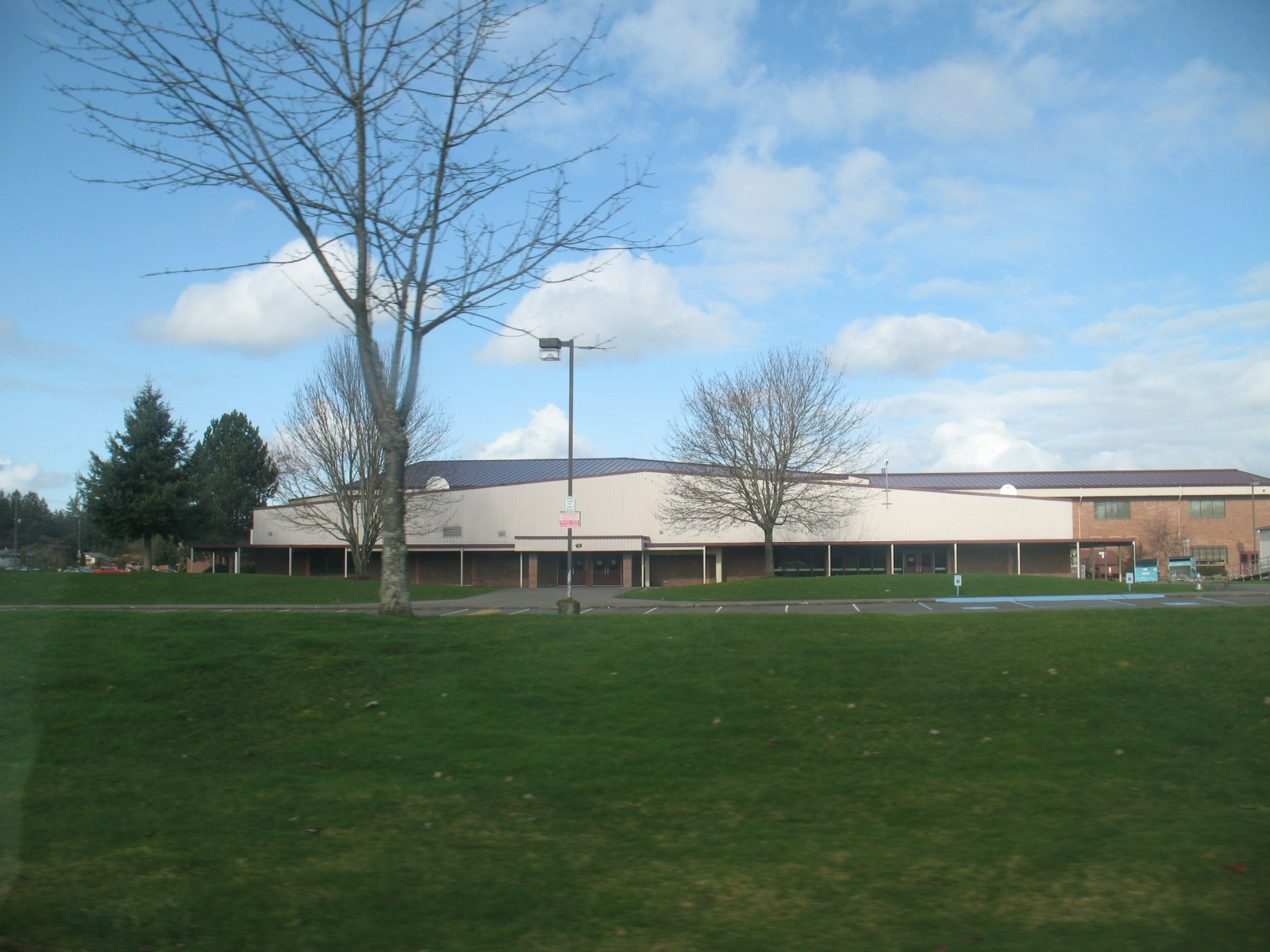
Bethel High School, where the incident took place

On April 26, 1983, an assembly was held at Bethel High School in Spanaway, Washington for student council elections. Students were required to either attend the assembly or report to study hall. (Note: Legal scholar John C. Polifka wrote: "In effect, student attendance was compelled.") At the assembly, Matthew Fraser, a 17-year-old senior, gave a speech nominating a classmate for student council vice president. To an audience of about 600 students and teachers, Fraser delivered the following speech:

I know a man who is firm – he's firm in his pants, he's firm in his shirt, his character is firm – but most . . . of all, his belief in you, the students of Bethel, is firm. Jeff Kuhlman is a man who takes his point and pounds it in. If necessary, he'll take an issue and nail it to the wall. He doesn't attack things in spurts – he drives hard, pushing and pushing until finally – he succeeds. Jeff is a man who will go to the very end – even the climax, for each and every one of you. So vote for Jeff for A. S. B. vice-president – he'll never come between you and the best our high school can be.

It took Fraser about one minute to deliver the speech. As he delivered it, several students in the audience "hooted and yelled" while others appeared "bewildered and embarrassed". Several students made gestures that simulated sexual acts alluded to in the speech. Fraser's candidate, Jeff Kuhlman, won the election with 90 percent of the vote.

Prior to the assembly, two of Fraser's teachers warned him that the speech was inappropriate and that he "probably should not deliver it" because doing so could have "severe consequences", though they did not suggest that doing so would violate school rules. The morning after the assembly, Fraser was called to the office, (Note: Fraser was also called to the principal's office immediately after giving the speech, though no disciplinary action was taken at the time.) where an assistant principal informed him that his speech violated a school rule against disruptive conduct. The rule, which appeared to be inspired by Tinker, prohibited "conduct which materially and substantially interferes with the educational process", including "obscene, profane language or gestures". Fraser admitted to using sexual innuendo in his speech on purpose and defended it as necessary to reach his core audience. Fraser was suspended for three days and his name was removed from the list of eligible graduation speakers.

Fraser appealed the decision through the school district's grievance procedures but was still found to be in violation of the disruptive conduct rule, though he was allowed to return to school after serving only two days of his three-day suspension. (Note: Despite his ban from speaking at graduation, Fraser was elected as a class speaker following a successful write-in campaign. The school board refused to accept the results but a district court ruling overturned their decision, granting Fraser an injunction allowing him to speak. Fraser ultimately spoke at graduation without incident.) Fraser, with his father acting as guardian ad litem, filed a lawsuit against the school district claiming that the suspension violated his First Amendment rights.

=== Lower court proceedings ===
Fraser's complaint was filed to the United States District Court for the Western District of Washington on May 23, 1983. A half-day hearing was held on May 31, after which Judge Jack Edward Tanner ruled in Fraser's favor. Tanner found that Fraser's speech was "not obscene under the appropriate tests for obscenity" and further held the school's disruptive conduct rule was "unconstitutionally vague, uncertain, and indefinite within the meaning of the due process clause of the Fourteenth Amendment". The school district appealed the decision to the Ninth Circuit Court of Appeals.

Oral arguments were held before the Ninth Circuit on March 7, 1984. A three-judge panel ruled in Fraser's favor on March 4, 1985. Writing for the majority, Judge William Albert Norris argued that Fraser's speech was protected under Tinker because the school district could not prove that the speech disrupted the learning environment. Norris wrote: "The administration had no difficulty in maintaining order during the assembly and Fraser's speech did not delay the assembly program." Judge Eugene A. Wright dissented, arguing that the ruling undermined the school's authority to maintain "standards of decency".

The school district filed a petition for a writ of certiorari to the Supreme Court of the United States on April 19, 1985. The Supreme Court granted certiorari on October 8, 1985.

== Opinion of the Court ==
Oral arguments were held on March 3, 1986. American Civil Liberties Union cooperating attorney Jeffrey T. Haley argued the case for Fraser, and William A. Coats argued for Bethel School District.

=== Majority opinion ===
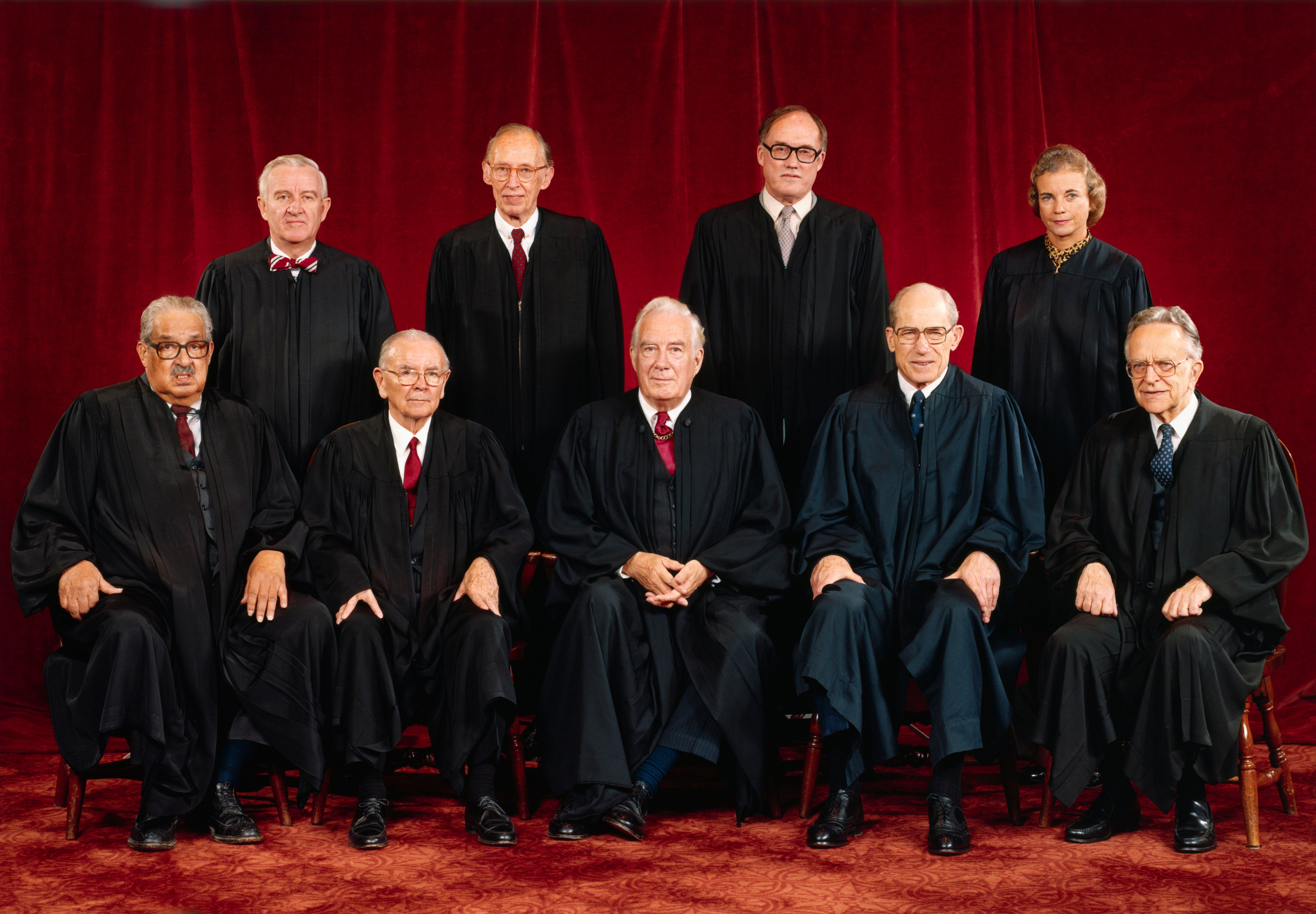
The Burger Court during the 1985 term, which decided the case

The Supreme Court ruled in the school's favor on July 7, 1986, in a 7–2 decision that reversed the judgment of the Ninth Circuit. Chief Justice Warren Burger authored the majority opinion. Burger concluded that Fraser's speech, which Burger found too offensive to include in his written opinion, was not protected by the First Amendment and the school board could permissibly sanction Fraser for giving it. Describing Fraser's speech as "vulgar" and "offensively lewd", Burger wrote:

The pervasive sexual innuendo in Fraser's speech was plainly offensive to both teachers and students – indeed to any mature person. By glorifying male sexuality, and in its verbal content, the speech was acutely insulting to teenage girl students. See App. 77-81. The speech could well be seriously damaging to its less mature audience, many of whom were only 14 years old and on the threshold of awareness of human sexuality.

Burger argued that, under New Jersey v. T. L. O. (1985), students in public schools are not entitled to the same constitutional rights as adults.

In Tinker v. Des Moines Independent Community School District (1969), the Court ruled that a public school could not discipline a student for wearing a black armband to protest the Vietnam War, declaring that students do not "shed their constitutional rights to freedom of speech or expression at the schoolhouse gate". Burger distinguished Fraser's speech from the armband in Tinker because the speech was not a "passive expression of a political viewpoint", but was instead "a sexually explicit monologue directed towards an unsuspecting audience of teenage students". Burger wrote that, because Fraser's suspension was "unrelated to any political viewpoint", it did not violate the protections offered by Tinker. Burger wrote: "The First Amendment does not prevent the school officials from determining that to permit a vulgar and lewd speech such as respondent's would undermine the school's basic educational mission."

Justice Harry Blackmun concurred in the majority without authoring an opinion.

=== Concurring opinion ===
Justice William Brennan wrote a concurring opinion. Brennan wrote that, while he did not consider Fraser's speech to be as lewd or offensive as Burger described, school officials still had the authority to discipline students who make disruptive comments at a school assembly. Brennan wrote:

It is true, however, that the State has interests in teaching high school students how to conduct civil and effective public discourse and in avoiding disruption of educational school activities. Thus, the Court holds that, under certain circumstances, high school students may properly be reprimanded for giving a speech at a high school assembly which school officials conclude disrupted the school's educational mission.

Brennan stressed that the school only retained this authority to protect the captive audience of the assembly, and that Fraser's speech may have been protected "had he given it in school but under different circumstances", such as in the hallway or at an extracurricular activity.

=== Dissenting opinions ===
Justice Thurgood Marshall filed a dissenting opinion. Marshall argued that Fraser's speech did not disrupt the learning environment and was therefore protected under Tinker. Marshall wrote: "Here the School District, despite a clear opportunity to do so, failed to bring in evidence sufficient to convince either of the two lower courts that education at Bethel School was disrupted by respondent's speech."

John Paul Stevens filed a separate dissenting opinion.

== Legacy ==
I won't deny that it seemed possible to me at the time that school officials might be displeased with my speech. But I also strongly believed that my First Amendment rights were of far greater importance than what school officials wanted to hear.

— Matthew Fraser in The Seattle Times

Matthew Fraser, then a student at the University of California, Berkeley, said of the ruling: "I'm not really surprised. The court has become mindlessly conservative lately. The rationale used in this case is nothing less than idiotic." Fraser wrote an op-ed for The Seattle Times later that month criticizing the ruling. He admitted that while his speech was "sophomoric", the Court erred in allowing the school to discipline him for giving it.

== See also ==
- School speech
  - Tinker v. Des Moines Independent Community School District, 393 U.S. 503 (1969)
  - Hazelwood School District v. Kuhlmeier, 484 U.S. 260 (1988)
  - Morse v. Frederick, 551 U.S. 393 (2007)
  - Mahanoy Area School District v. B.L., 594 U.S. 180 (2021)
- List of United States Supreme Court cases
  - List of United States Supreme Court cases, volume 478
  - List of United States Supreme Court cases involving the First Amendment
