= Bethel High School (Washington) =

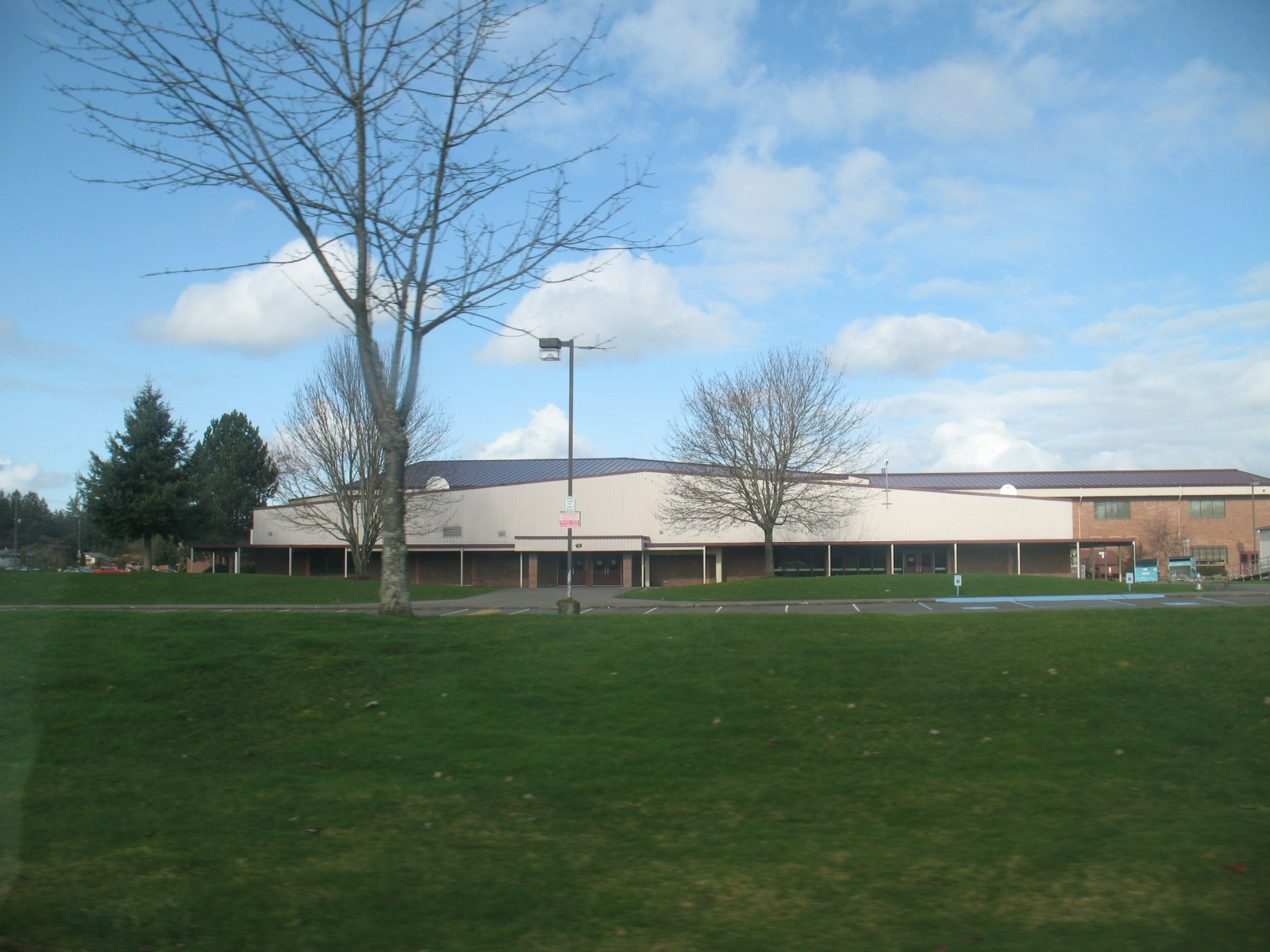

Location
- 22215 38th Avenue East; Spanaway, Washington 98387-6828; United States; 47°03′15″N 122°22′40″W

Information
- Type: Public secondary
- Established: 1952
- School district: Bethel School District
- Principal: Christy Rodriguez
- Teaching staff: 80.80 (FTE)
- Grades: 9–12
- Enrollment: 1,651 (2023–2024)
- Student to teacher ratio: 20.43
- Campus: Suburban
- Colors: Crimson, Gray & Black
- Mascot: Bison
- Website: https://bhs.bethelsd.org/

Bethel High School is a public high school located in Spanaway, Washington. It is one of four high schools in the Bethel School District, is the district's oldest, having been founded in 1952.

== Academics ==
Bethel High School offers a variety of AP courses in math and computer science, the sciences, English studies, and history and social science.

English

- AP Language
- AP Literature

History & Social Science

- AP Human Geography
- AP Psychology
- AP US History

Math & Computer Science

- AP Precalculus
- AP Calculus AB
- AP Computer Science Principles

Sciences

- AP Biology
- AP Environmental Science
- AP Chemistry

== Athletics ==
Bethel is part of the Bethel School District along with Spanaway Lake High School and Graham-Kapowsin High School. Bethel competes in the South Puget Sound League (SPSL) 4A in Washington's West Central District.

== History ==
During the 1983 elections for student council, student Matthew Fraser delivered a sexually suggestive speech while nominating a classmate for student council vice president. Fraser was suspended from Bethel High School for three days, but filed a lawsuit against the school board, alleging that the suspension violated his First Amendment right to free speech. The case was ultimately granted certiorari by the Supreme Court of the United States, which held in the landmark decision Bethel School District v. Fraser (1986) that it does not violate the First Amendment for public schools to punish students for lewd or indecent speech.

== Notable alumni ==
- Corey Belser, NBA European player, 2006 CI NCAA Defensive POY
- Mike Blowers, MLB player 1989–1999, broadcaster
- Ezra Cleveland, NFL player for the Jacksonville Jaguars
- Derrike Cope, NASCAR Driver, winner of the 1990 Daytona 500
- Morgan Hicks, 2004 Olympian and rifle coach at University of Nebraska
- KC Montero, Filipino-American actor and television personality
- Caesar Rayford, NFL and CFL player
- Rick Story, UFC fighter and wrestler
