= Mike Blowers =

American baseball player and broadcaster (born 1965)

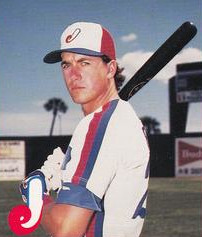
- Blowers with the Jacksonville Expos in 1988
- Third baseman
- Born: April 24, 1965 (age 61); Würzburg, West Germany
- Batted: Right Threw: Right

MLB debut
- September 1, 1989, for the New York Yankees

Last MLB appearance
- October 3, 1999, for the Seattle Mariners

MLB statistics
- Batting average: .257
- Home runs: 78
- Runs batted in: 365
- Stats at Baseball Reference

Teams
- New York Yankees (1989–1991); Seattle Mariners (1992–1995); Los Angeles Dodgers (1996); Seattle Mariners (1997); Oakland Athletics (1998); Hanshin Tigers (1999); Seattle Mariners (1999)

Michael Roy Blowers (/ˈblaʊ.ərz/; born April 24, 1965) is an American former professional baseball player. He was primarily a third baseman for the New York Yankees, Seattle Mariners, Los Angeles Dodgers, and Oakland Athletics. From 2007 to 2024, he was a color commentator for Mariners television and radio broadcasts, working primarily with Dave Sims and Aaron Goldsmith.

== Early years ==
Born in Würzburg, West Germany, Blowers lived in Oklahoma and then West Germany until the seventh grade, when his U.S. Army stepfather was transferred to Fort Lewis, near Tacoma, Washington. He graduated from Bethel High School in Spanaway in 1983 and played college baseball first at Tacoma Community College. Following his freshman year, Blowers was selected by the Mariners in the 1984 Major League Baseball draft, but opted not to sign. After two years at Tacoma, he transferred to the University of Washington. During his only season with the Huskies, he won the triple crown in the Pac-10 North Division and was selected by the Montreal Expos in the tenth round of the 1986 MLB draft.

== Professional career ==
Blowers made his Major League Baseball debut with the New York Yankees on September 1, 1989, and played his last game on October 3, 1999 with the Seattle Mariners.

During a Yankees road game against the Texas Rangers at Arlington Stadium on April 21, 1990, Blowers hit his first two MLB home runs, the first off Charlie Hough in the fifth inning, and the second off Craig McMurtry in the ninth. On May 3, playing in Yankee Stadium, he committed 4 errors at third base, leading to 7 unearned runs, in a 10–5 loss to the Cleveland Indians. At the time he was the 21st American League third basemen with 4 errors in one game. The only third baseman to commit more errors in a game was Dave Brain, with 5 for the Boston Beaneaters in 1906.

Blowers was the 13th player to hit grand slams in consecutive games, which he did on May 16 and 17, 1993 with the Mariners. He hit for the cycle on May 18, 1998, as a member of the Oakland Athletics.

In 1995, Blowers hit .257 with 23 home runs and 96 RBI for the Mariners as they made their first postseason and advanced to the American League Championship Series. His 33 RBI in August remains the most by a Mariners player in a single month, a record he co-holds with Hall of Famer Edgar Martínez.

In 1999, Blowers played 73 games with the Hanshin Tigers of the Nippon Professional Baseball.

== Post-playing career ==
Beginning in 2007, Blowers was a television and radio color commentator for the Seattle Mariners. He worked alongside Ford C. Frick Award winning broadcaster Dave Niehaus and Dave Sims. Blowers stopped working for the Mariners after the 2024 season.

Blowers was inducted into the Tacoma Community College Athletics Hall of Fame in 2007.

Blowers owns and manages a number of Washington-based companies, including Beach Wood Homes of Fife and Keymark Real Estate of Puyallup.

=== Prediction of Tuiasosopo's first career home run ===
During the pre-game broadcast of a September 27, 2009, bout between the Mariners and the Toronto Blue Jays, Blowers predicted Matt Tuiasosopo's first career home run. What started as simply selecting a notable player for the day's game became an extended humorous rant by Blowers. In the course of pre-game banter, he stated that the home run would come in Tuiasosopo's second at bat, on a fastball from Brian Tallet with a 3-1 count, and that the ball would land in the second deck of left center field. This then happened - with correct prediction of player, at-bat, count, pitch, and general landing area - in the top of the fifth inning.

Blowers was on the television side of the broadcast when the prediction came true, and laughed it off without explanation, though days later explained that Tallet likes to throw fastballs, but has poor control of his pitches. Tallet was also a relief pitcher who was in the starting rotation in the 2009 season, increasing his workload. Radio announcers Rick Rizzs and Niehaus, however, recalled the prediction, restated it for the audience, and were beside themselves in laughter and disbelief as the prediction came true. Said Niehaus on-air, seconds before the event, "I've never been so excited on a 3–1 count in my life!" As Tuiasosopo circled the bases, Niehaus exclaimed "I see the light! I believe you Mike!"

== See also ==
- List of Major League Baseball players to hit for the cycle

Achievements
| Preceded by John Olerud | Hitting for the cycle May 18, 1998 | Succeeded by Dante Bichette |
