= Lake Kapowsin =

Lake in Pierce County, Washington, United States

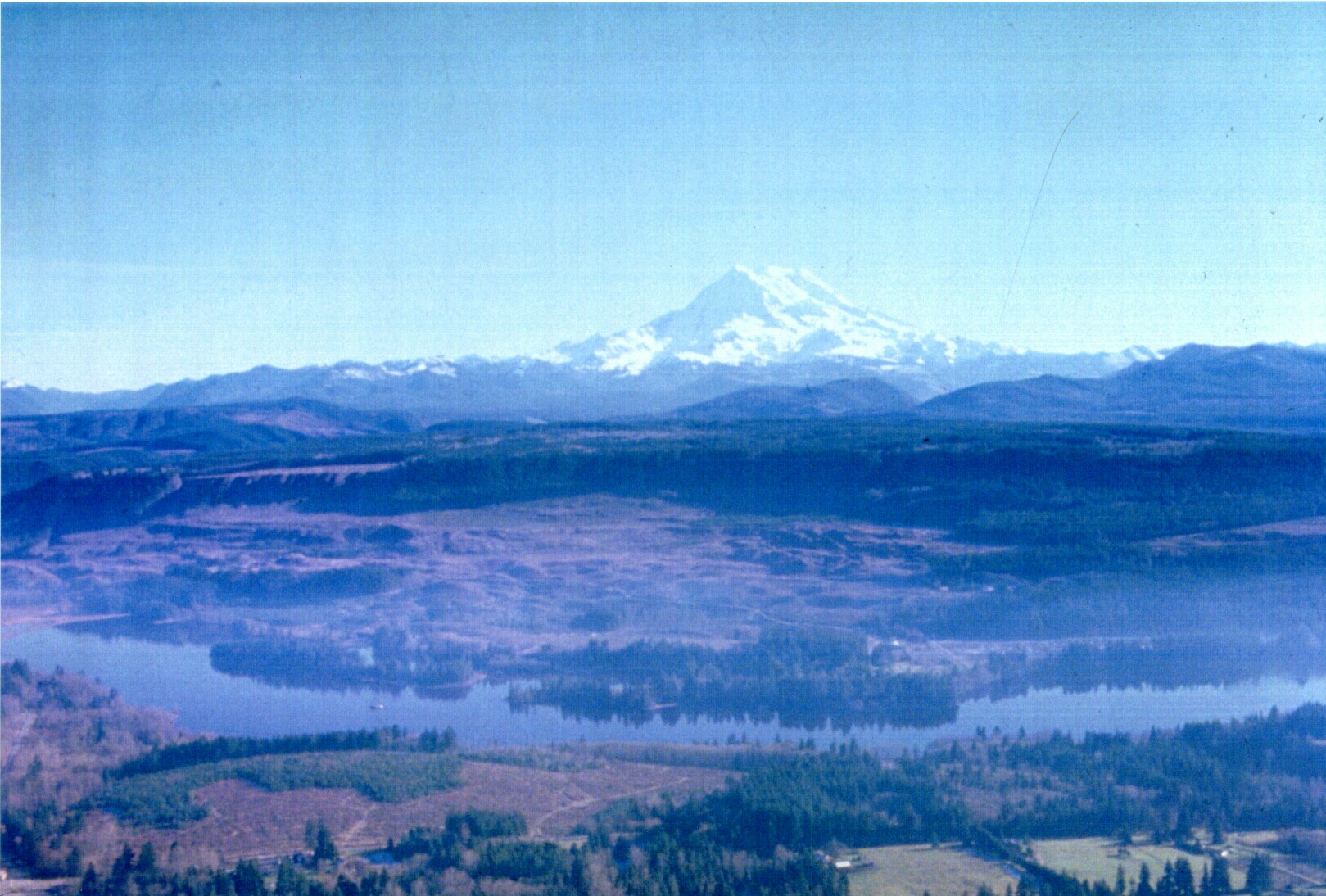

- Location within Washington (state)
- Location: Pierce County, Washington
- Coordinates: 46°58′42″N 122°13′07″W
- Primary inflows: Ohop Creek
- Primary outflows: Kapowsin Creek
- Surface area: 512 acres (207 ha)
- Average depth: 20–30 ft (6.1–9.1 m)
- Max. depth: 30 ft (9.1 m)
- Surface elevation: 584 ft (178 m)
- Settlements: Kapowsin, Washington; Voss Resort

Lake Kapowsin /kəˈpaʊ.ə.sɪn/ is a lake in Pierce County, Washington, about halfway between Tacoma on Puget Sound, and Mount Rainier in the Cascade Mountains. The lake is 2.5 miles (4.0 km) long and 0.15–0.5 miles (0.24–0.80 km) wide, lying in a channel formed by meltwater from the Puget lobe of the Vashon glacier during the Pleistocene glaciation. A small island, Jaybird Island, lies in the northern half of the lake. As indicated by a drowned forest in the lake and other evidence, the Puyallup River was inundated about 550 years ago by a lahar from Mount Rainier called the Electron Mudflow. The mudflow partially filled the channel (leading to its shallow, smooth bottom today) and blocked Ohop Creek's outlet, forming present-day Lake Kapowsin.

The Tacoma Rail shortline runs along the west side of the lake, as does Orville Road connecting Eatonville to the south with the town of Kapowsin.

The lake contains a number of fish species and is stocked with rainbow trout, rated "excellent" for fishing by Washington Department of Fish and Wildlife, as is the yellow perch.
