= Spanaway Lake High School =

Coordinates: 47°06′21″N 122°24′45″W

Location
- 1305 168th St E Spanaway, Washington 98387; United States

Information
- Type: Public secondary
- School district: Bethel School District
- Principal: Hans Nelson
- Teaching staff: 78.50 (FTE)
- Grades: 9–12
- Enrollment: 1,787 (2024-2025)
- Student to teacher ratio: 22.76
- Campus: Suburban
- Colors: Black, Silver, Teal & White
- Mascot: Sentinels
- Website: slhs.bethelsd.org

Spanaway Lake High School is a high school in Spanaway, Washington, for grade levels nine through 12.

== History ==
Spanaway Lake High School underwent a major remodel which included the students being taught at Liberty Junior High for the 2009–2010 school year. The school was reopened in fall 2010.

The Spanaway Lake wrestling team was co-champions of the 2001 wrestling season. Coach Greeley led the Sentinels to three consecutive top four finishes including the school's first state title in 2001 and a runner-up finish in 2003. The wrestling room of the new remodeled school was named in Paul Greeley's honor.

== Academics ==
In 2007, six percent of 10th graders meet standard on the Washington Assessment of Student Learning (WASL) writing test and seven percent meet standard on the WASL reading test. The overall writing scores have increased 28 percentage points in five years. SLHS currently has to improve in the areas of math and science. Among 10th graders, 33 percent meet the standard in math and 23 percent meet the standard in science.

The school is offering a greater selection of math courses to its students, as well as providing increased training to teachers to help them reach struggling students in math and science. SLHS made adequate yearly progress (AYP) in 79% of student categories. The school did not meet the standard in math among several sub-groups and reading among special education students. Each year individual schools and the school district must "raise the bar" in gradual increments so that by 2014, 100 percent of students achieve proficiency in each subject.

== Notable alumni ==
- Jerry Cantrell, lead singer and guitarist of Alice in Chains
- Jacob Castro, soccer player and goalkeeper for Seattle Sounders FC
- Jo Koy, comedian and actor (attended)
- Gerianne Pérez, Broadway musical theatre actress
