= Spanaway, Washington =

Census-designated place in Washington, United States

- CDP
- Location of Spanaway, Washington

- Location within Washington (state) Location within the United States
- Coordinates: 47.098061°N 122.42337°W
- Country: United States
- State: Washington
- County: Pierce

Area
  - Total: 9.144 sq mi (23.683 km^{2})
  - Land: 8.744 sq mi (22.648 km^{2})
  - Water: 0.399 sq mi (1.033 km^{2}) 4.36%
- Elevation: 384 ft (117 m)

Population (2020)
  - Total: 35,476
  - Estimate (2023): 34,322
  - Density: 4,055.9/sq mi (1,565.99/km^{2})
- Time zone: UTC–8 (Pacific (PST))
  - Summer (DST): UTC–7 (PDT)
- ZIP Code: 98387
- Area codes: 253 and 564
- FIPS code: 53-66255
- GNIS feature ID: 2408784

Spanaway is a census-designated place (CDP) in Pierce County, Washington, United States. The population was 35,476 at the 2020 census, and was estimated at 34,322 in 2023. Spanaway is an unincorporated area near Tacoma, and is often identified together with the more urban, less wealthy Parkland.

Spanaway's main business thoroughfare is Pacific Avenue South, which is a north–south road that coincides with State Route 7 through the Spanaway area.

== History ==
The Hudson's Bay Company, headquartered at Fort Nisqually, had control of this region until 1863. Company maps and journals show the company's subsidiary, the Pugets Sound Agricultural Company, raised cattle, grain, and sheep at "Spanueh Station" on the south and east shores of "Spanueh Lake." Spanueh is the Hudson Bay Company's spelling of the native Lushootseed spadue, which means "dug roots" referring to an area where camas and other edible roots can be found. Lushootseed underwent a loss of nasal consonants in the 1800s, so "Spanueh" simply transcribes an older pronunciation of what is now "Spadue".

The first white settler to take a donation claim by the lake, Henry de la Bushalier, tried to rename the lake after himself. That faded away with his death one year later. In 1890 the area was renamed "Lake Park" as a planned community by the Lake Park Land, Railway and Improvement Company, which bought all the nearby land east of the lake and built a rail line to its "recreation mecca" on the shore of "Spanaway Lake." When Mount Rainier National Park was established in 1899, tourists would take the train to its terminus in Lake Park and from there make the two-day journey to Mount Rainier, making Spanaway the original "gateway" to Mount Rainier. The journey was made by stagecoach, with an overnight stop in Eatonville; the route was in operation as early as 1893.

Although the U.S. Board on Geographic Names recognized the community of "Lake Park" in 1897, it had to very belatedly reverse its decision in 1970 to accept common usage: Spanaway (Spanueh).

In the 21st century, several attempts were made to incorporate Spanaway and neighboring communities into a city.

== Geography ==
According to the United States Census Bureau, the CDP has a total area of 9.144 square miles (23.68 km^{2}), of which 8.745 square miles (22.65 km^{2}) is land and 0.399 square miles (1.03 km^{2}) (4.36%) is water.

== Demographics ==
Historical population
| Census | Pop. | Note | %± |
|---|---|---|---|
| 1970 | 5,768 | | — |
| 1980 | 8,868 | | 53.7% |
| 1990 | 15,001 | | 69.2% |
| 2000 | 21,588 | | 43.9% |
| 2010 | 27,227 | | 26.1% |
| 2020 | 35,476 | | 30.3% |
| 2023 (est.) | 34,322 | ▼ | −3.3% |
U.S. Decennial Census; 1970 1980 1990; 2000 2010

=== Racial and ethnic composition ===
Spanaway, Washington – racial and ethnic composition Note: the US Census treats Hispanic/Latino as an ethnic category. This table excludes Latinos from the racial categories and assigns them to a separate category. Hispanics/Latinos may be of any race.
| Race / ethnicity (NH = non-Hispanic) | Pop. 1980 | Pop. 1990 | Pop. 2000 | Pop. 2010 | Pop. 2020 |
|---|---|---|---|---|---|
| White alone (NH) | 7,634 (86.08%) | 11,616 (77.43%) | 14,867 (68.87%) | 16,325 (59.96%) | 17,363 (48.94%) |
| Black or African American alone (NH) | 362 (4.08%) | 1,122 (7.48%) | 1,931 (8.94%) | 2,822 (10.36%) | 3,715 (10.47%) |
| Native American or Alaska Native alone (NH) | — | 199 (1.33%) | 317 (1.47%) | 266 (0.98%) | 387 (1.09%) |
| Asian alone (NH) | — | 1,307 (8.71%) | 1,345 (6.23%) | 1,736 (6.38%) | 2,628 (7.41%) |
| Pacific Islander alone (NH) | — | — | 451 (2.09%) | 1,016 (3.73%) | 1,786 (5.03%) |
| Other race alone (NH) | 579 (6.53%) | 11 (0.07%) | 64 (0.30%) | 42 (0.15%) | 199 (0.56%) |
| Mixed race or multiracial (NH) | — | — | 1,428 (6.61%) | 2,121 (7.79%) | 3,818 (10.76%) |
| Hispanic or Latino (any race) | 293 (3.30%) | 746 (4.97%) | 1,185 (5.49%) | 2,899 (10.65%) | 5,580 (15.73%) |
| Total | 8,868 (100.00%) | 15,001 (100.00%) | 21,588 (100.00%) | 27,227 (100.00%) | 35,476 (100.00%) |

=== American Community Survey ===
According to the 2023 American Community Survey, there are 11,653 households in Spanaway, with an average of 2.94 persons per household. The CDP has a median household income of $94,028. Approximately 9.7% of the CDP's population lives at or below the federal poverty line. Spanaway has an estimated 60.3% employment rate, with 15.6% of the population holding a bachelor's degree or higher and 90.6% holding a high school diploma. There were 12,060 housing units at an average density of 1,379.07 per square mile (532.5/km^{2}).

The top five reported languages (people were allowed to report up to two languages, thus the figures will generally add to more than 100%) were English (76.2%), Spanish (9.7%), Indo-European (6.0%), Asian and Pacific Islander (7.1%), and Other (1.0%).

The median age in the CDP was 32.5 years.

=== 2020 census ===
As of the 2020 census, Spanaway had a population of 35,476 and 11,644 households, of which 8,711 were families; the population density was 4,056.72 inhabitants per square mile (1,566.3/km^{2}).

There were 12,011 housing units at an average density of 1,373.47 per square mile (530.3/km^{2}), and 3.1% were vacant. The homeowner vacancy rate was 0.6%, and the rental vacancy rate was 3.9%.

Of all households, 39.1% had children under the age of 18 living in them. 51.0% were married-couple households, 16.5% were households with a male householder and no spouse or partner present, and 23.0% were households with a female householder and no spouse or partner present. About 18.1% of all households were made up of individuals, and 6.9% had someone living alone who was 65 years of age or older.

The median age was 34.1 years. 26.9% of residents were under the age of 18, and 11.5% of residents were 65 years of age or older. For every 100 females, there were 99.0 males, and for every 100 females age 18 and over, there were 96.5 males age 18 and over.

100.0% of residents lived in urban areas, while 0.0% lived in rural areas.

Racial composition as of the 2020 census
| Race | Number | Percent |
|---|---|---|
| White | 18,541 | 52.3% |
| Black or African American | 3,887 | 11.0% |
| American Indian and Alaska Native | 527 | 1.5% |
| Asian | 2,692 | 7.6% |
| Native Hawaiian and Other Pacific Islander | 1,852 | 5.2% |
| Some other race | 2,357 | 6.6% |
| Two or more races | 5,620 | 15.8% |
| Hispanic or Latino (of any race) | 5,580 | 15.7% |

=== 2010 census ===
As of the 2010 census, there were 27,227 people, 9,472 households, and _ families residing in the CDP. The population density was 3,103.15 inhabitants per square mile (1,198.1/km^{2}). There were 10,079 housing units at an average density of 1,148.73 per square mile (443.5/km^{2}). The racial makeup of the CDP was 63.73% White, 10.75% African American, 1.12% Native American, 6.58% Asian, 3.81% Pacific Islander, 4.48% from some other races and 9.53% from two or more races. Hispanic or Latino people of any race were 10.65% of the population.

=== 2000 census ===
As of the 2000 census, there were 21,588 people, 7,659 households, and 5,820 families residing in the CDP. The population density was 2,591.97 inhabitants per square mile (1,000.8/km^{2}). There were 7,963 housing units at an average density of 956.08 per square mile (369.1/km^{2}). The racial makeup of the CDP was 71.13% White, 9.11% African American, 1.61% Native American, 6.34% Asian, 2.12% Pacific Islander, 2.15% from some other races and 7.55% from two or more races. Hispanic or Latino people of any race were 5.49% of the population.

There were 7,659 households, out of which 40.4% had children under the age of 18 living with them, 57.1% were married couples living together, 13.6% had a female householder with no husband present, and 24.0% were non-families. 18.2% of all households were made up of individuals, and 4.8% had someone living alone who was 65 years of age or older. The average household size was 2.82, and the average family size was 3.17.

In the CDP, the age distribution of the population shows 30.0% under the age of 18, 8.4% from 18 to 24, 32.7% from 25 to 44, 21.5% from 45 to 64, and 7.3% who were 65 years of age or older. The median age was 33 years. For every 100 females, there were 99.3 males. For every 100 females age 18 and over, there were 96.2 males.

The median income for a household in the CDP was $46,210, and the median income for a family was $50,076. Males had a median income of $35,525 versus $26,758 for females. The per capita income for the CDP was $17,928. About 7.8% of families and 10.8% of the population were below the poverty line, including 15.5% of those under age 18 and 7.3% of those age 65 or over.

== Notable people ==
- Mike Blowers, MLB baseball player
- Jerry Cantrell, Alice In Chains guitarist
- Jacob Castro, soccer player
- Ezra Cleveland, NFL player for the Jacksonville Jaguars
- Derrike Cope, NASCAR driver
- Jo Koy, stand-up comedian
- Rick Story, Ultimate Fighting Championship fighter
- Vinnie Chas, bass player for Pretty Boy Floyd

== Education ==
Public schools in Spanaway are part of the Bethel School District:

=== Elementary schools ===
- Camas Prairie Elementary School
- Centennial Elementary School
- Clover Creek Elementary School
- Evergreen Elementary School (2018 National Blue Ribbon Award Winning School)
- Naches Trail Elementary School
- Pioneer Valley Elementary School
- Shining Mountain Elementary School
- Spanaway Elementary School
- Thompson Elementary School

=== Junior high schools ===
- Bethel Middle School
- Cedarcrest Middle School
- Liberty Middle School
- Spanaway Middle School
- Cougar Mountain Middle School

=== High schools ===
- Bethel High School
- Challenger Secondary School
- Spanaway Lake High School

=== Private schools ===
- Bethel Baptist Christian School (grades K4-12)
- Elk Plain School of Choice (elementary grades)

=== Nearby postsecondary schools ===
- Pacific Lutheran University (Parkland)
- Colleges in Tacoma
- Colleges in Lakewood
- Colleges in Puyallup
- Colleges offering courses at Joint Base Lewis-McChord
