= Jacob Castro (soccer) =

American soccer player (born 1999)

- Castro celebrating a September 2026 win versus Indy Eleven

Personal information
- Full name: Jacob Alex Castro
- Date of birth: December 18, 1999 (age 26)
- Place of birth: Tukwila, Washington, United States
- Height: 6 ft 4 in (1.93 m)
- Position: Goalkeeper

Team information
- Current team: Rhode Island FC
- Number: 29

Youth career
- 2017–2019: Seattle Sounders FC

College career
Years	Team	Apps	(Gls)
2019–2021	Washington Huskies	2	(0)
2021–2022	San Diego State Aztecs	33	(0)

Senior career*
Years	Team	Apps	(Gls)
2018	Seattle Sounders FC 2	4	(0)
2023–2025	Seattle Sounders FC	0	(0)
2023–2025	Tacoma Defiance	42	(0)
2026–	Rhode Island FC	2	(0)
- * Club domestic league appearances and goals as of January 13, 2026

Jacob Alex Castro (born December 18, 1999) is an American soccer player who plays as a goalkeeper for Rhode Island FC.

Originally signed in the Seattle Sounders FC organization, he joined the club's academy in 2017 and played for their reserve team Seattle Sounders FC 2 the following year. Castro played college soccer with the Washington Huskies and the San Diego State Aztecs from 2019 to 2022. He signed a contract with Seattle Sounders FC in December 2022.

== Career ==
Castro was raised in Spanaway, Washington, and joined the Seattle Sounders FC academy in 2017. He made his debut for USL club Seattle Sounders FC 2 on August 19, 2018, in a 4–1 loss to Portland Timbers 2. Castro made four total appearances for the reserve side.

He played two years of college soccer with the Washington Huskies and started two matches as a freshman in 2019. Castro then transferred to the San Diego State Aztecs in 2021, where he played 17 matches and earned seven shutouts. He was named to the All-Pac-12 First Team during his first year at San Diego State and the Second Team in 2022, where he made 16 appearances.

Castro signed a professional contract with Seattle Sounders FC on December 13, 2022, becoming the club's 21st Homegrown Player.

On January 13, 2026, Castro signed as a goalkeeper with Rhode Island FC for the 2026 season.
