= South Creek, Washington =

- CDP
- Location within Washington (state)
- Coordinates: 47°00′03″N 122°23′27″W
- Country: United States
- State: Washington
- County: Pierce

Area
  - Total: 7.68 sq mi (19.89 km^{2})
  - Land: 7.68 sq mi (19.89 km^{2})
  - Water: 0 sq mi (0.0 km^{2})
- Elevation: 472 ft (144 m)

Population (2020)
  - Total: 2,519
  - Density: 328/sq mi (126.7/km^{2})
- Time zone: UTC-8 (PST)
  - Summer (DST): UTC-7 (PDT)
- ZIP code: 98387
- Area code: 253
- GNIS feature ID: 2585039

South Creek is a census-designated place located in Pierce County, Washington, United States. The population was 2,519 at the 2020 census.

== Demographics ==
Historical population
Census	Pop.	Note	%±
2010	2,507		—
2020	2,519		0.5%
U.S. Decennial Census; 1960 1970 1980 1990; 2000 2010 2020

South creek first appeared as a census designated place in the 2010 U.S. census.

=== Racial and ethnic composition ===
South Creek CDP, Washington – Racial and ethnic composition Note: the US Census treats Hispanic/Latino as an ethnic category. This table excludes Latinos from the racial categories and assigns them to a separate category. Hispanics/Latinos may be of any race.
Race / Ethnicity (NH = Non-Hispanic)	Pop 2010	Pop 2020	% 2010	% 2020
White alone (NH)	2,182	2,048	87.04%	81.30%
Black or African American alone (NH)	34	37	1.36%	1.47%
Native American or Alaska Native alone (NH)	29	33	1.16%	1.31%
Asian alone (NH)	17	37	0.68%	1.47%
Native Hawaiian or Pacific Islander alone (NH)	8	12	0.32%	0.48%
Other race alone (NH)	5	10	0.20%	0.40%
Mixed race or Multiracial (NH)	90	184	3.59%	7.30%
Hispanic or Latino (any race)	142	158	5.66%	6.27%
Total	2,507	2,519	100.00%	100.00%

=== 2020 census ===
As of the census of 2020, it had a population of 2,519 inhabitants. 958 housing units.

=== 2010 census ===
As of the census of 2010, it had a population of 2,507 inhabitants. 989 housing units. 1,213 are male. 1,294 are female.
