= Graham, Washington =

Graham
- CDP
- Location of Graham, Washington
- Coordinates: 47°01′33″N 122°15′42″W
- Country: United States
- State: Washington
- County: Pierce

Area
  - Total: 21.4 sq mi (55.5 km^{2})
  - Land: 21.4 sq mi (55.5 km^{2})
  - Water: 0 sq mi (0.0 km^{2})
- Elevation: 830 ft (250 m)

Population (2020)
  - Total: 32,658
  - Density: 1,520/sq mi (588/km^{2})
- Time zone: UTC-8 (Pacific (PST))
  - Summer (DST): UTC-7 (PDT)
- ZIP code: 98338
- Area code: 253
- FIPS code: 53-27785
- GNIS feature ID: 2408312

Graham is a census-designated place (CDP) in Pierce County, Washington, United States. It is located 16.2 miles southeast of Tacoma. The population was 23,491 at the 2010 census and grew to 32,658 at the 2020 census.

== Geography ==
According to the United States Census Bureau, the CDP has a total area of 21.4 square miles (55.5 km^{2}), all of it land.

== Demographics ==
Historical population
Census	Pop.	Note	%±
2000	8,739		—
2010	23,491		168.8%
2020	32,658		39.0%
U.S. Decennial Census; 1970 1980 1990; 2000 2010

Graham first appeared as a census designated place in the 2000 U.S. census.

=== Racial and ethnic composition ===
Graham CDP, Washington – Racial and ethnic composition Note: the US Census treats Hispanic/Latino as an ethnic category. This table excludes Latinos from the racial categories and assigns them to a separate category. Hispanics/Latinos may be of any race.
Race / Ethnicity (NH = Non-Hispanic)	Pop 2000	Pop 2010	Pop 2020	% 2000	% 2010	% 2020
White alone (NH)	7,748	18,674	22,382	88.66%	79.49%	68.53%
Black or African American alone (NH)	111	899	1,376	1.27%	3.83%	4.21%
Native American or Alaska Native alone (NH)	101	245	332	1.16%	1.04%	1.02%
Asian alone (NH)	156	650	1,344	1.79%	2.77%	4.12%
Native Hawaiian or Pacific Islander alone (NH)	44	275	560	0.50%	1.17%	1.71%
Other race alone (NH)	29	42	185	0.33%	0.18%	0.57%
Mixed race or Multiracial (NH)	304	1,229	3,033	3.48%	5.23%	9.29%
Hispanic or Latino (any race)	246	1,477	3,446	2.81%	6.29%	10.55%
Total	8,739	23,491	32,658	100.00%	100.00%	100.00%

=== 2020 census ===
As of the 2020 census, Graham had a population of 32,658. The median age was 36.2 years. 26.9% of residents were under the age of 18 and 12.0% of residents were 65 years of age or older. For every 100 females there were 100.8 males, and for every 100 females age 18 and over there were 99.6 males age 18 and over.

81.2% of residents lived in urban areas, while 18.8% lived in rural areas.

There were 10,655 households in Graham, of which 40.7% had children under the age of 18 living in them. Of all households, 61.1% were married-couple households, 14.5% were households with a male householder and no spouse or partner present, and 16.9% were households with a female householder and no spouse or partner present. About 14.9% of all households were made up of individuals and 6.2% had someone living alone who was 65 years of age or older.

There were 11,038 housing units, of which 3.5% were vacant. The homeowner vacancy rate was 1.0% and the rental vacancy rate was 4.9%.

Racial composition as of the 2020 census
Race	Number	Percent
White	23,356	71.5%
Black or African American	1,432	4.4%
American Indian and Alaska Native	400	1.2%
Asian	1,383	4.2%
Native Hawaiian and Other Pacific Islander	581	1.8%
Some other race	1,267	3.9%
Two or more races	4,239	13.0%

=== 2000 census ===
As of the census of 2000, there were 8,739 people, 2,989 households, and 2,427 families residing in the CDP. The population density was 407.9 people per square mile (157.5/km^{2}). There were 3,120 housing units at an average density of 145.6/sq mi (56.2/km^{2}). The racial makeup of the CDP was 90.15% White, 1.28% African American, 1.28% Native American, 1.80% Asian, 0.50% Pacific Islander, 0.98% from other races, and 4.01% from two or more races. Hispanic or Latino of any race were 2.81% of the population.

There were 2,989 households, out of which 42.5% had children under the age of 18 living with them, 68.8% were married couples living together, 7.7% had a female householder with no husband present, and 18.8% were non-families. 14.3% of all households were made up of individuals, and 3.7% had someone living alone who was 65 years of age or older. The average household size was 2.92 and the average family size was 3.20.

In the CDP, the population was spread out, with 30.3% under the age of 18, 6.7% from 18 to 24, 32.5% from 25 to 44, 24.1% from 45 to 64, and 6.4% who were 65 years of age or older. The median age was 35 years. For every 100 females, there were 101.0 males. For every 100 females age 18 and over, there were 98.9 males.

The median income for a household in the CDP was $52,824, and the median income for a family was $55,800. Males had a median income of $45,348 versus $25,802 for females. The per capita income for the CDP was $21,126. About 4.4% of families and 7.6% of the population were below the poverty line, including 9.4% of those under age 18 and 8.3% of those age 65 or over.

== Library ==
- Pierce County Library System, Graham Branch

== Education ==
Bethel School District includes most of Graham. Some parts of northeast Graham are in the Orting School District, and small portions of Graham to the north are in the Puyallup School District.

Schools in or near Graham include:

- Elementary Schools:
  - Centennial Elementary School
  - Graham Elementary School
  - Kapowsin Elementary School
  - Nelson Elementary School
  - North Star Elementary School
  - Rocky Ridge Elementary School
- Middle Schools:
  - Cougar Mountain Middle School
  - Frontier Middle School
  - Liberty Middle School
- High School:
  - Graham-Kapowsin High School
  - Bethel High School
- Private school:
  - Bethel Baptist Christian School (grades K4-12)
- Nearby colleges:
  - Pacific Lutheran University (Parkland)
  - Colleges in Tacoma
  - Colleges in Lakewood
  - Colleges in Puyallup
  - Colleges offering classes at Joint Base Lewis-McChord
