= Graham-Kapowsin High School =

Public school in Washington, United States

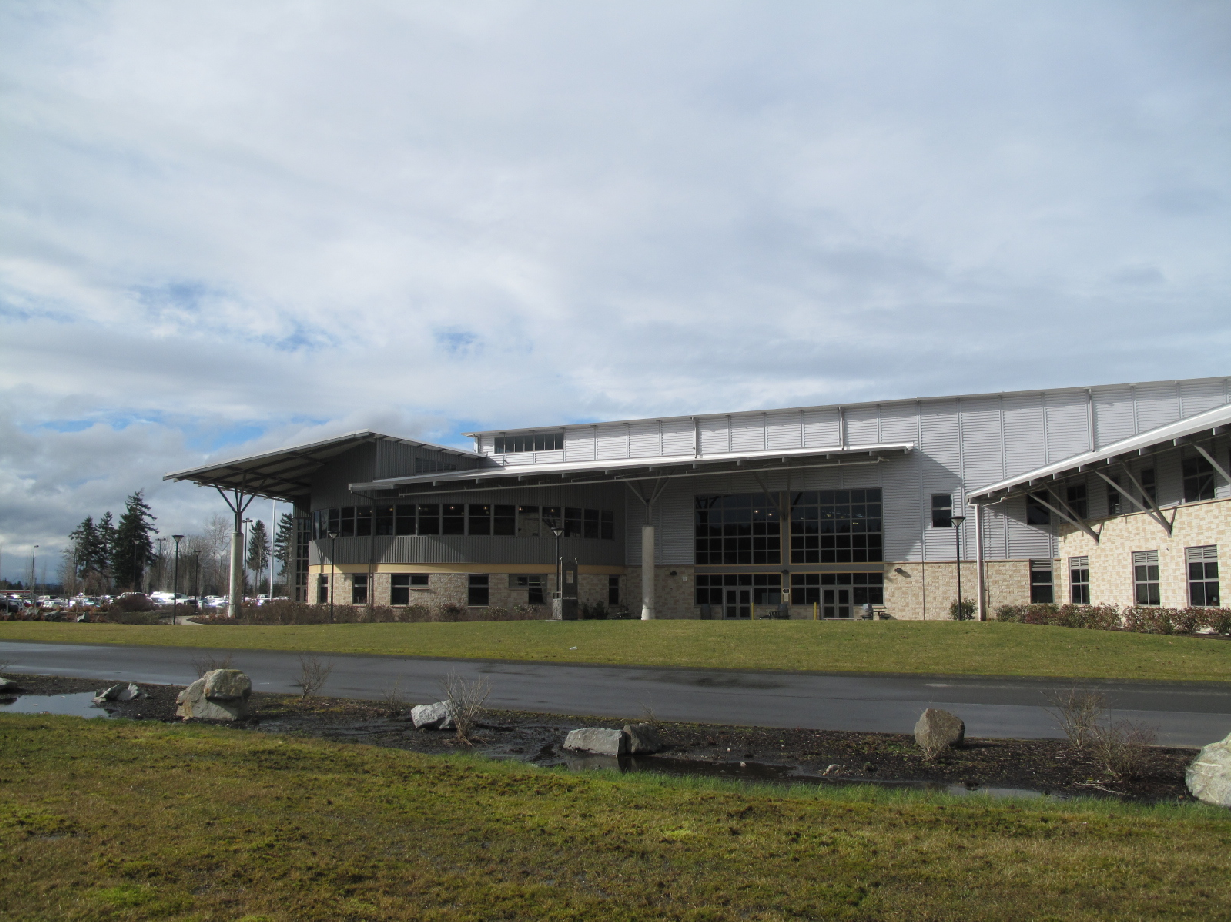

Location
- 22100 108th Avenue East; Graham, Washington 98338; United States; 47°03′27″N 122°17′12″W

Information
- School type: Public High School
- Motto: Orange and blue starts with you
- School district: Bethel School District
- Teaching staff: 86.30 (on an FTE basis)
- Grades: 9-12
- Gender: Coed
- Enrollment: 2,087 (2024–2025)
- Student to teacher ratio: 24.18
- Colors: Royal blue and orange
- Nickname: Eagles
- Website: gkhs.bethelsd.org

Graham-Kapowsin High School is a high school in the Bethel School District, Pierce County, Washington, United States. Its doors first opened to grade 10 and 11 students in September 2005. GK added grade 12 students beginning Fall 2006. Grade 9 joined in the 2012–13 school year.

== Demographics ==
The demographic breakdown of the 1,833 students enrolled in the 2022–23 school year was:

- Male - 50.6%
- Female - 49.4%
- Native American/Alaskan - 1.0%
- Asian - 4.1%
- Black - 7.8%
- Hispanic - 18.8%
- Hawaiian/Pacific Islander - 4.0%
- White - 48.9%
- Multiracial - 15.3%

49.0% of the students were eligible for free or reduced lunch.

== Academics ==
Languages taught at this school include Spanish, French, German, and Japanese. AP classes are also offered.

== Athletics ==
The GK Eagles are members of the South Division of the South Puget Sound League in Washington's West Central District.

The 2021 football team finished with an undefeated season and a Class 4A state title.

== Notable alumni ==
- Vega Ioane, offensive guard for the Baltimore Ravens
- Foster Sarell, offensive tackle for the Washington Commanders

== History ==
Two students were shot and wounded in December 2017, as they were bystanders near by a fight that was taking place; a shooter claimed that he was firing towards people involved in a physical altercation but the rounds hit people that were not involved in the fight. Six rounds were fired. The shooter, a former student, received 13 years imprisonment.
