= List of colleges active at Joint Base Lewis-McChord =

Several colleges and universities offer classes at Joint Base Lewis–McChord (JBLM) near Tacoma, Washington. The Fort Lewis and McChord AFB Education Centers host these colleges, which offer a variety of course work to serve both civilians and military personnel. Several hundred undergraduate and graduate college courses are offered on base each year. Information is available on how to transfer college credits.

College	Program(s) at JBLM	Comments
Brandman University	Fort Lewis program and McChord AFB program	Offers Bachelor's and Master's degrees.
Central Texas College	Fort Lewis program	Offers Associate in General Studies degrees.
Embry–Riddle Aeronautical University	McChord AFB program	Offers Associate in Science, Bachelor of Science, and Master of Aeronautical Science degrees, and several certificates.
Pierce College	Fort Lewis and McChord AFB programs	Offers AA (Associate of Arts) and ATG (Associate in Technology-General) degrees.
Saint Martin's University	Fort Lewis and McChord AFB programs	Offers Bachelor's and Master's degrees and teacher certification/endorsement programs.
Southern Illinois University	McChord AFB program	Offers Bachelor of Science degrees.
Troy University	Fort Lewis program	Offers Associate of Science, Bachelor of Science, Master of Science, and Master of Business Administration (MBA) degrees.

== See also ==
- Joint Base Lewis–McChord
- McChord Air Force Base
- Pierce County, Washington
- College Level Examination Program (CLEP)
