= Washington State Route 99 =

Highway in the Seattle metropolitan area, Washington, U.S.

State Route 99
- Pacific Highway; William P. Stewart Memorial Highway
- A map of the Seattle metropolitan area with SR 99 highlighted in red.

Route information
- Maintained by WSDOT
- Length: 48.97 mi (78.81 km)
- Existed: 1969–present

Southern segment
- South end: I-5 in Fife
- Major intersections: SR 18 in Federal Way; SR 509 in Federal Way; SR 509 / SR 516 in Des Moines
- North end: SR 518 in SeaTac

Northern segment
- South end: SR 599 in Tukwila
- Major intersections: SR 509 in Seattle; SR 104 in Edmonds; SR 525 in Lynnwood
- North end: I-5 / SR 526 / SR 527 in Everett

Location
- Country: United States
- State: Washington
- Counties: Pierce, King, Snohomish

Highway system
- State highways in Washington; Interstate; US; State; Scenic; Pre-1964; 1964 renumbering; Former
← US 97	→ SR 100

State Route 99 (SR 99), also known as the Pacific Highway, is a state highway in the Seattle metropolitan area, part of the U.S. state of Washington. It runs 49 miles (79 km) from Fife to Everett, passing through the cities of Federal Way, SeaTac, Seattle, Shoreline, and Lynnwood. The route primarily follows arterial streets, including Aurora Avenue, and has several freeway segments, including the tolled SR 99 Tunnel in Downtown Seattle. SR 99 was officially named the William P. Stewart Memorial Highway by the state legislature in 2016, after a campaign to replace an unofficial moniker honoring Confederate president Jefferson Davis.

SR 99 was originally a section of U.S. Route 99 (US 99), which was once the state's primary north–south highway before the construction of I-5. US 99 was created in 1926 and replaced earlier local roads that date back to the 1890s and state roads designated as early as 1913. The highway was moved onto the Alaskan Way Viaduct in 1953, replacing a congested stretch through Downtown Seattle, and other sections were built to expressway standards in the 1950s.

US 99 was ultimately replaced by the Tacoma–Everett section of Interstate 5 (I-5), which opened in stages between 1965 and 1969. The route was decertified in 1969, and SR 99 was created to keep segments of the highway under state control. After decades of crime on some sections of SR 99, various city governments funded projects to beautify the highway and convert it into a boulevard. A section of the highway in Tukwila was transferred to city control in 2004, creating a two-mile (3.2 km) gap in the route between the interchanges of SR 518 and SR 599.

The Alaskan Way Viaduct was closed on January 11, 2019, and was replaced with a downtown bored tunnel that opened on February 4, 2019. The replacement project was spurred by the 2001 Nisqually earthquake, which damaged the viaduct and left it vulnerable to further damage, as well as city plans to revitalize the Seattle waterfront. The $3 billion megaproject was mired in planning delays for several years before construction began in 2011 with the partial demolition of the viaduct. The tunnel was constructed using Bertha, the world's largest tunnel boring machine at the time of its launch in 2013, which had a two-year halt and completed its bore in 2017. The viaduct was demolished in 2019, leaving room for an expanded park promenade on Alaskan Way that was completed in early 2025.

== Route description ==
SR 99 follows a section of former U.S. Route 99 (US 99) within the Seattle metropolitan area, from Fife to southern Everett. It is officially designated as the William P. Stewart Memorial Highway, but is commonly known as the Pacific Highway or by one of its local names. The entire highway is listed as part of the National Highway System, a national network of roads identified as important to the national economy, defense, and mobility. A section of the highway from Tukwila to Shoreline is also designated as a Highway of Statewide Significance by the state legislature. The Washington State Department of Transportation (WSDOT) estimates that average traffic volumes on SR 99, measured in terms of annual average daily traffic for 2016, range from a minimum of 17,000 vehicles on Everett Mall Way to a maximum of 97,000 at the First Avenue South Bridge in Seattle.

=== Fife to SeaTac ===
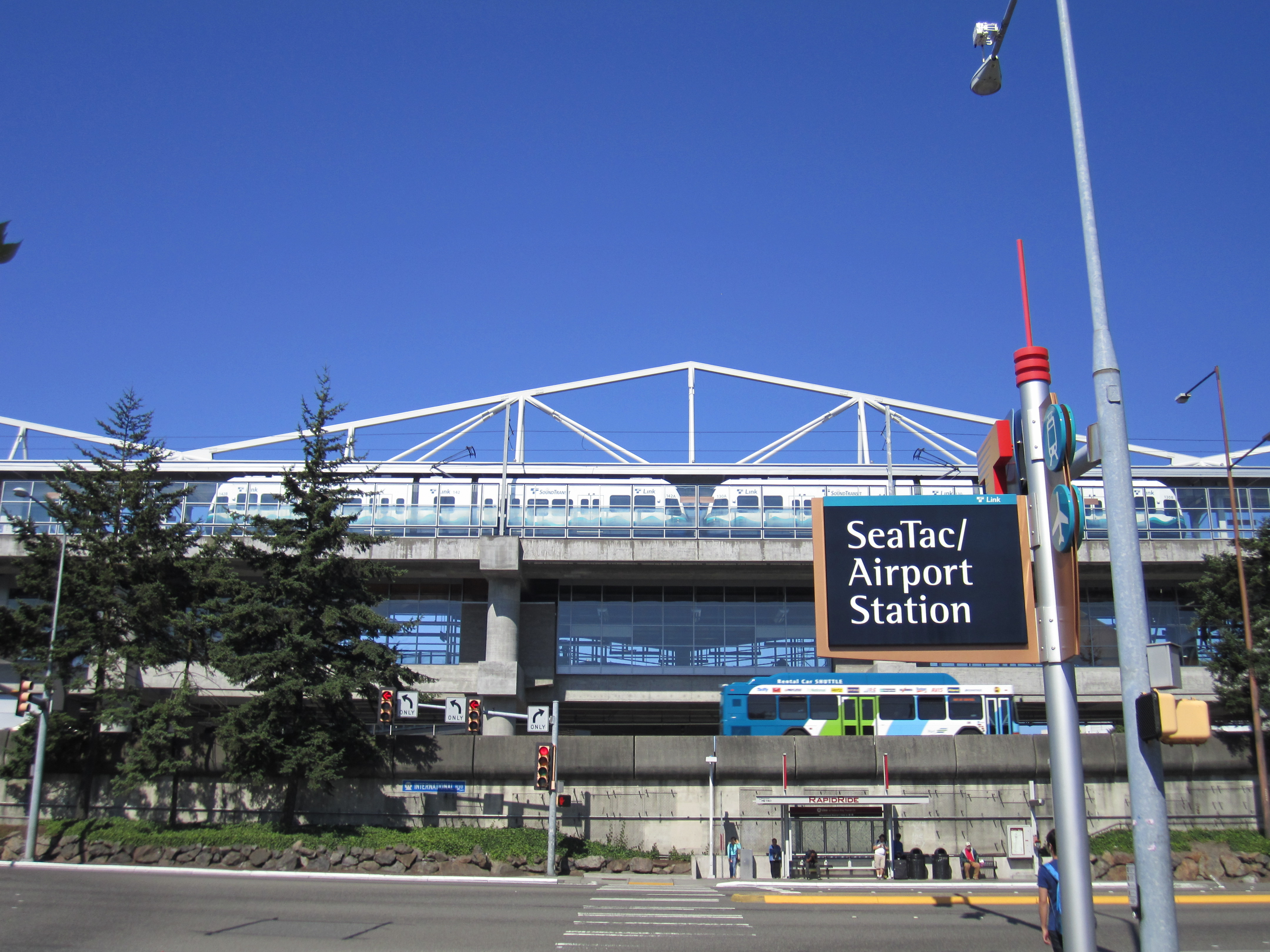
The light rail station serving Seattle–Tacoma International Airport, seen from across SR 99

SR 99 begins in Fife as an extension of 54th Avenue East at a partial cloverleaf interchange with Interstate 5. Immediately north of the interchange, SR 99 turns east onto Pacific Highway and passes the Emerald Queen Casino, a gambling and hotel facility operated by the Puyallup Tribe, and a commercial district at the outskirts of Fife. The highway makes a gradual turn to the north, parallel to Interstate 5 and the West Fork of Hylebos Creek, and enters Milton. SR 99 travels north along a ridge and crosses into King County, turning northeast and entering the city of Federal Way. The road cuts through a forested part of the Hylebos basin near West Hylebos Wetlands Park and reaches a commercial district surrounding Kitts Corner.

At Kitts Corner, the highway intersects the western section of State Route 18, which continues east to an interchange with I-5 and onto a freeway traveling towards Auburn and Covington. SR 99 continues due north through Federal Way's main commercial strip and passing Celebration Park, The Commons at Federal Way, and Steel Lake. The highway gains a set of high-occupancy vehicle lanes that are also open to right turns into parking lots and side streets. From northern Federal Way to the Redondo area of Des Moines, SR 99 is concurrent with SR 509, which continues southwest to Dash Point State Park and northwest to downtown Des Moines, for four miles (6 km).

The two highways pass Saltwater State Park and the former Midway landfill before splitting near Highline College at an intersection with Kent Des Moines Road (SR 516). SR 99 then enters the city of SeaTac and continues north as International Boulevard, passing a federal detention center and light rail station on the southwest side of Angle Lake. The highway runs along the east side of Seattle–Tacoma International Airport and its expressway, serving the airport's terminals, parking garage, light rail station, and nearby hotels. SR 99 terminates at an interchange with SR 518 in southern Tukwila, near the airport's consolidated rental car facility and the Tukwila light rail station. A 2.4-mile (3.9 km) section of International Boulevard in Tukwila forms the gap between the two segments of SR 99.

=== Seattle and Aurora Avenue ===
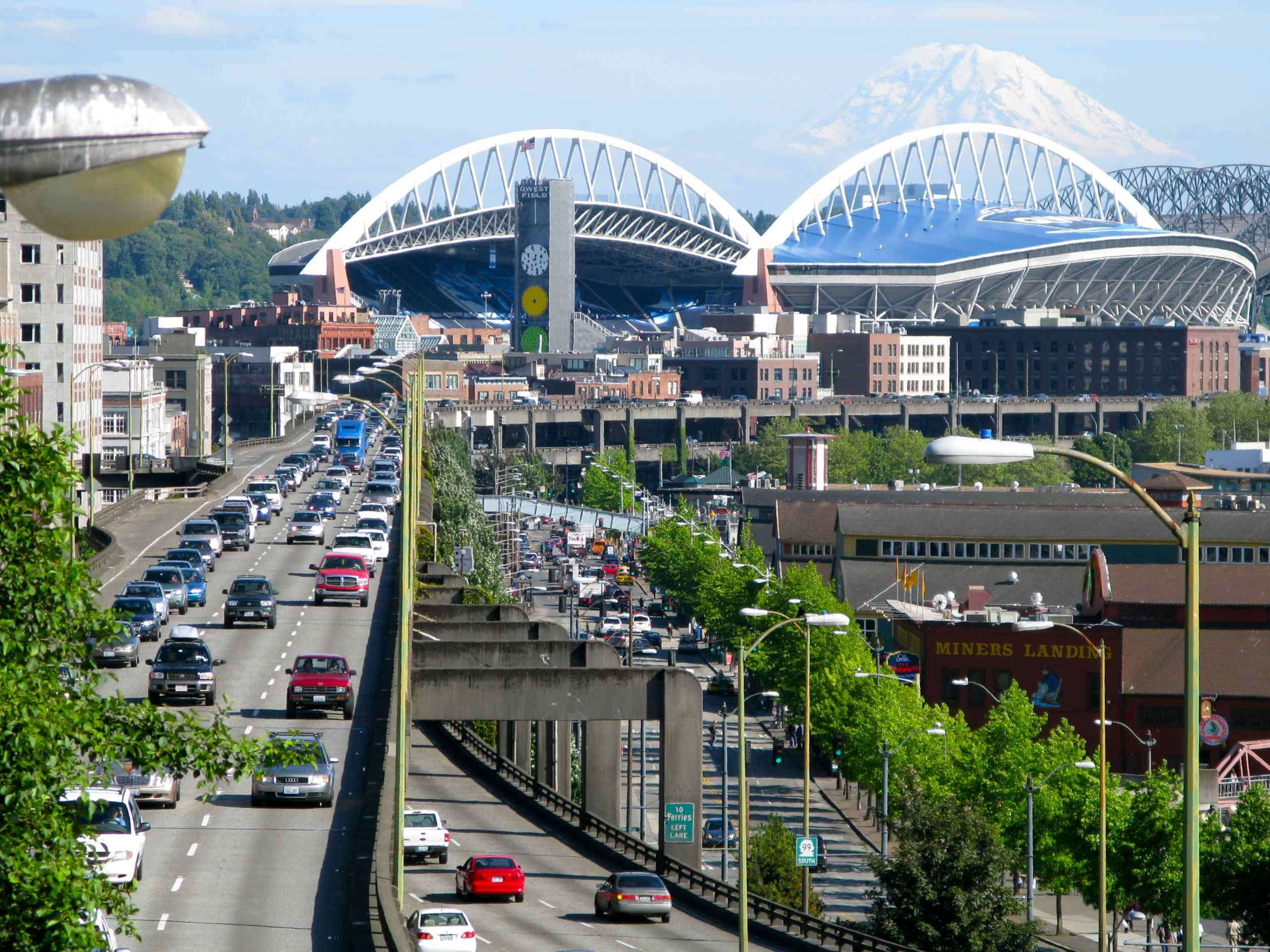
Looking south from Victor Steinbrueck Park on the Alaskan Way Viaduct, which until 2019 carried SR 99 through Downtown Seattle

SR 99 resumes at the north end of Tukwila International Boulevard and supersedes SR 599, a short freeway connecting to I-5, near the Duwamish River. The freeway travels northwest along the river's west bank through an industrial area that faces Boeing Field. It then enters the city of Seattle and intersects the Des Moines Memorial Drive in the South Park neighborhood before the freeway ends. At an interchange with SR 509, SR 99 turns north and travels across the Duwamish River on the First Avenue South Bridge, a pair of bascule bridges that form a continuation of the SR 509 freeway.

At the north end of the bridge, SR 99 turns northwest onto East Marginal Way South and travels through Seattle's industrial neighborhood along the east bank of the Duwamish Waterway. The six-lane street turns north and passes a cement factory before transforming into a four-lane freeway at an interchange with the West Seattle Freeway on the east end of the West Seattle Bridge. SR 99 widens to six lanes, including a northbound bus lane, and passes through the SoDo neighborhood as the dividing line between the Port of Seattle's container ship terminals to the west and industrial businesses to the east beyond a rail terminal. The freeway passes the corporate headquarters of Starbucks and Coast Guard Station Seattle before turning northeast to reach the southern portal of the Alaskan Way Tunnel near Lumen Field and T-Mobile Park. The tunnel portal includes ramps to and from nearby streets, including Dearborn Street, Alaskan Way, and a frontage road along the east side of the highway.

The tunnel travels 1.8 miles (2.9 km) under Downtown Seattle and carries SR 99 along the central waterfront, running roughly parallel to the former Alaskan Way Viaduct. It is arranged with two stacked decks, carrying two lanes of southbound traffic on the upper deck and two lanes of northbound traffic on the lower deck. SR 99 emerges from the tunnel on the north side of Denny Way and travels onto Aurora Avenue North through the South Lake Union neighborhood, located to the east of the Seattle Center and the Space Needle. Aurora Avenue continues north as a six-lane street with bus lanes and a median barrier that restricts access from side streets to right-in/right-out. The highway runs along the eastern slope of Queen Anne Hill, above the Westlake neighborhood along Lake Union, to the Lake Washington Ship Canal.

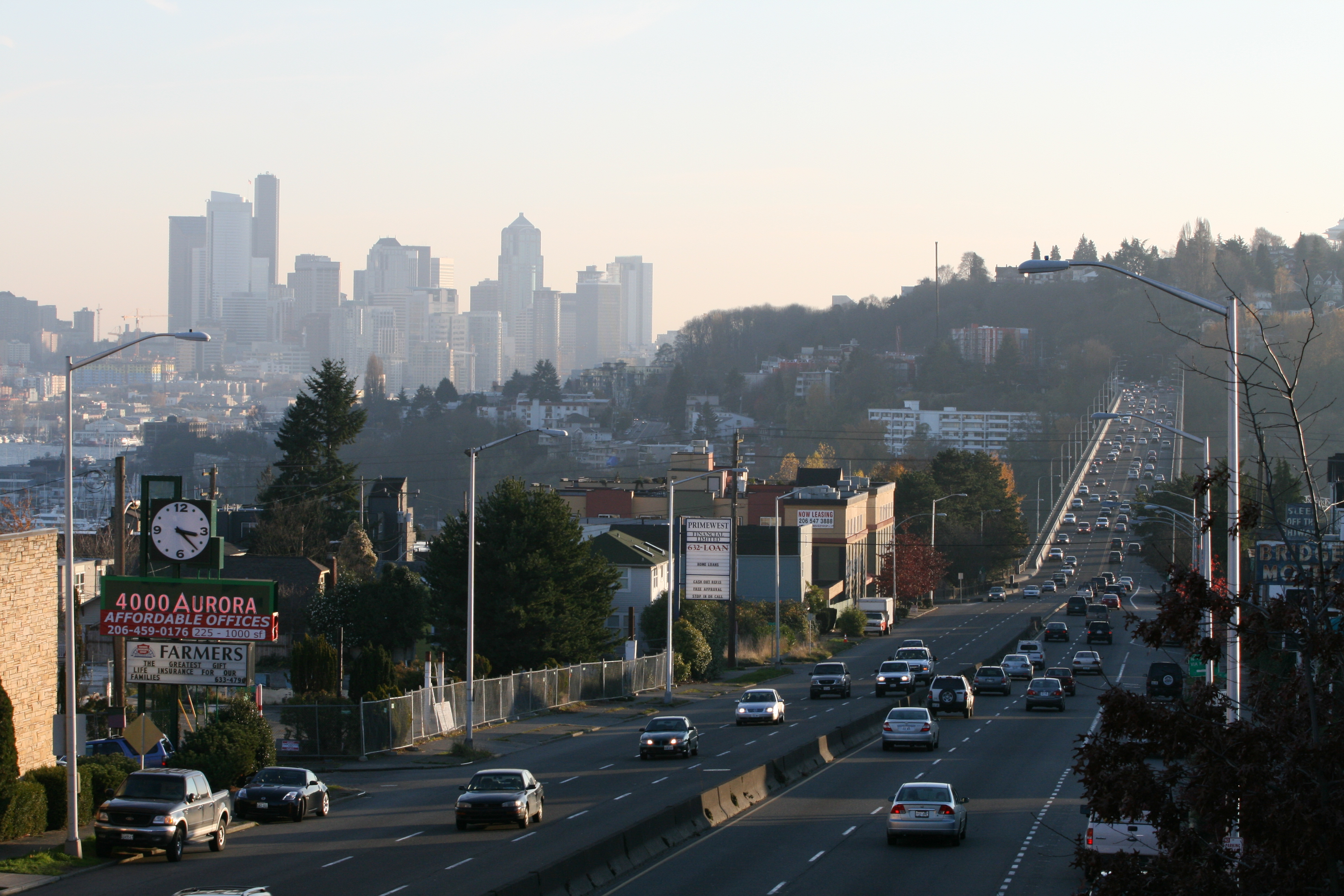
Aurora Avenue with the George Washington Memorial Bridge and the Downtown Seattle skyline in the background

Aurora Avenue then crosses the ship canal on the George Washington Memorial Bridge (commonly known as the Aurora Bridge), a steel cantilever arch bridge with a clearance of 167 feet (51 m). The bridge has six lanes and no median barrier, which resumes after an interchange with Bridge Way on the north approach, which crosses over the Fremont Troll. The highway continues north through part of Fremont and intersects North 46th Street before entering Woodland Park. SR 99 forms the boundary between Woodland Park to the east and the Woodland Park Zoo to the west and passes under a series of three pedestrian overpasses. The highway turns northeast to follow the shore of Green Lake and passes through the residential districts of Phinney Ridge and Greenwood, where traffic signals replace the medians and right-in/right-out access. SR 99 passes west of the North Seattle College campus in Licton Springs and intersects Northgate Way, a major street that provides access to Northgate Mall. Aurora Avenue then bisects the Evergreen Washelli Memorial Park, the city's largest cemetery, and passes between Haller Lake and Bitter Lake before reaching the northern city boundary at North 145th Street (SR 523).

=== Shoreline and Snohomish County ===
SR 99 enters Shoreline and passes through the city's main commercial district, running parallel to the Interurban Trail. The stretch of Aurora Avenue through Shoreline has a landscaped median, plant buffers for sidewalks, several left-turn pockets, and an overpass for the Interurban Trail. Near Shorewood High School and the Shoreline city hall, the highway is flanked to the east by the Interurban Trail and a park with a preserved section of the original North Trunk Road, which was paved in red bricks. After passing Echo Lake and the Aurora Village shopping center, SR 99 reaches an interchange with SR 104 near the boundary between King and Snohomish counties. The highway intersects SR 104 Spur on the county line itself, which lies south of the interchange.

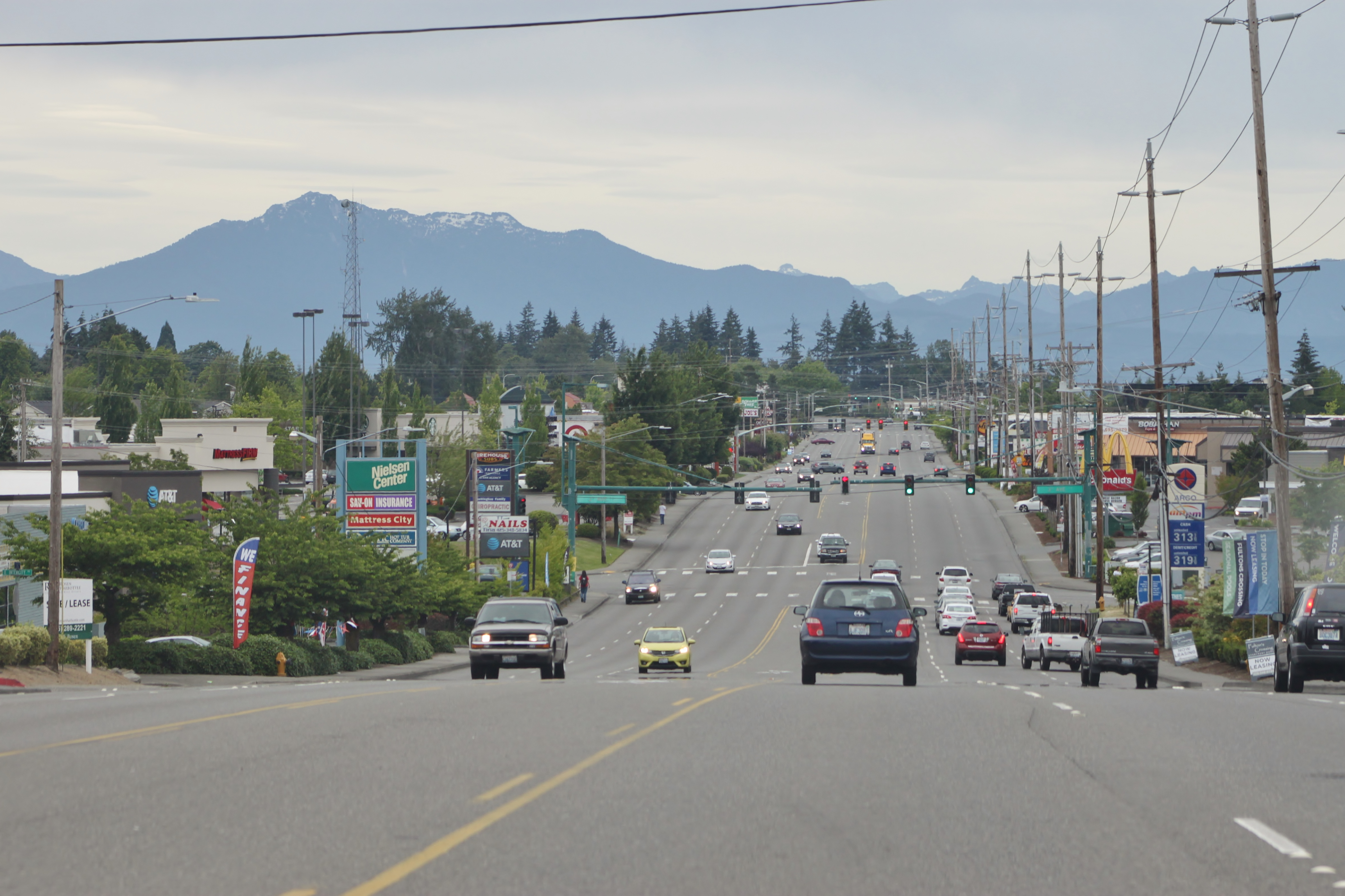
Looking northbound on Everett Mall Way, which carries SR 99 between Evergreen Way and I-5 in Everett

After the interchange, the highway turns northeast and runs through a predominantly commercial area of Edmonds, passing east of the Swedish Medical Center's Edmonds campus and west of Hall Creek and the Interurban Trail. SR 99 continues northeast into Lynnwood and passes the Edmonds College campus before reaching the Crossroads commercial district at a junction with 196th Street Southwest (SR 524). The highway runs along the city's retail strip and through its international district (also described as a Koreatown), which is surrounded by apartments and homes that are set back from SR 99.

Beyond the city limits of Lynnwood, SR 99 enters an unincorporated area near Lake Serene. The highway intersects SR 525 at a partial cloverleaf interchange and crosses Airport Road, which provides access to Paine Field and its passenger terminal. The highway travels north into Everett on Evergreen Way and turns northeast onto Everett Mall Way in the Fairmont neighborhood. SR 99 then passes through several residential subdivisions and reaches the Everett Mall, where it turns north and terminates at the Broadway Interchange. The interchange includes connections to I-5, the Boeing Freeway (SR 526), and SR 527. The road itself continues north towards Downtown Everett as Broadway.

== History ==
=== Pacific Highway and U.S. Route 99 ===
SR 99 was created from the remnants of US 99, a national highway which spanned Western Washington from the Oregon border in Vancouver to the Canadian border at the Peace Arch in Blaine. US 99 itself was preceded by a century-old network of military roads, wagon roads, and auto trails that were built across the state in the 19th century and early 20th century until it was formally incorporated into the state highway system.

In southern King County, modern-day SR 99 runs parallel to a section of the Fort Steilacoom–Fort Bellingham military road, constructed in the 1850s by the U.S. Army. A section north of Seattle follows the R.F. Morrow wagon road, constructed in 1901 and later incorporated into the North Trunk Road. The North Trunk Road was completed from Seattle to the area east of Edmonds in August 1912 and initially paved with bricks. The Seattle–Everett Interurban Railway was also built along sections of the wagon road in 1906 and would serve Everett–Seattle traffic until 1939.

The Pacific Highway, an inter-state coastal highway, was championed by good roads advocates in the early 1910s and added to the state highway system in 1913. It originally followed the Puyallup and Green rivers from Tacoma to Renton and the Bothell–Everett Highway (now SR 527) along North Creek in Snohomish County. The highway was designated as State Road 1 in 1923, a number that it would retain after the creation of Primary State Highway 1 (PSH 1) in 1937. The Pacific Highway was incorporated into the new national numbered highway system in 1926 as US 99, connecting the three West Coast states and running from the Mexican border to Canada. The Bothell route was bypassed by a newer and straighter highway to the west that opened on October 9, 1927, shortening the distance from Seattle to Everett by 3.8 miles (6.1 km) and featuring overpasses for the existing interurban and a gravel median strip in some sections. It was built by the state government in tandem with a set of new bridges connecting Everett to Marysville and cost $645,000 (equivalent to $9.61 million in 2025 dollars) to construct and partially pave. The White River route was bypassed in early 1928 by the 24-mile-long (39 km) Highline route, which traveled along the western plateau near Des Moines. The new highway cost $3 million (equivalent to $44.4 million in 2025 dollars) to construct and pave and reduced the distance to Tacoma by 9.3 miles (15.0 km).

US 99 was originally routed north from Downtown Seattle on 4th Avenue, Westlake Avenue, 7th Avenue, and Dexter Avenue, crossing the Lake Washington Ship Canal on the Fremont Bridge before continuing onto Fremont Avenue. A high-level crossing of the Ship Canal to replace the existing drawbridges was proposed in the 1920s as the "final link" in the Pacific Highway. The 132-foot-high (40 m) bridge was funded by the state, county, and municipal governments and approved for construction in 1927. Construction on the bridge began in 1929 and was completed on February 22, 1932, during a dedication ceremony that named it the George Washington Memorial Bridge. The bridge was sited on Aurora Avenue, which was expanded into a limited-access expressway that extended south to Denny Way and north through Woodland Park to North 65th Street. The expressway on the north side of the bridge was completed in May 1933 after a public debate over its routing through Woodland Park, which was opposed by The Seattle Times and conservationists. The debate was settled after the passing of a city council ordinance in June 1930 and a ballot measure in November that approved the through-park route.

=== Viaduct and expressway construction ===
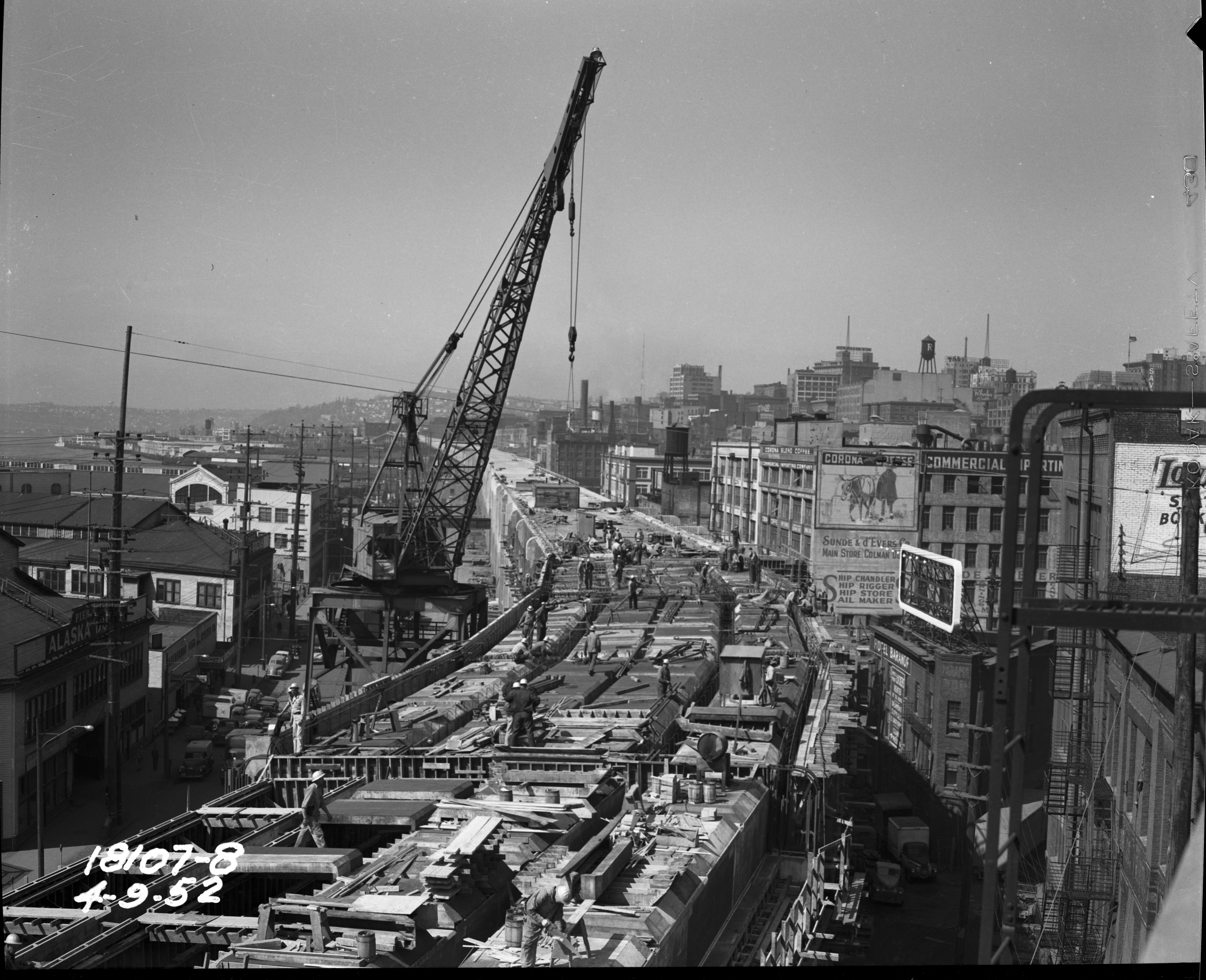
Alaskan Way Viaduct construction near South Main Street, seen in April 1952

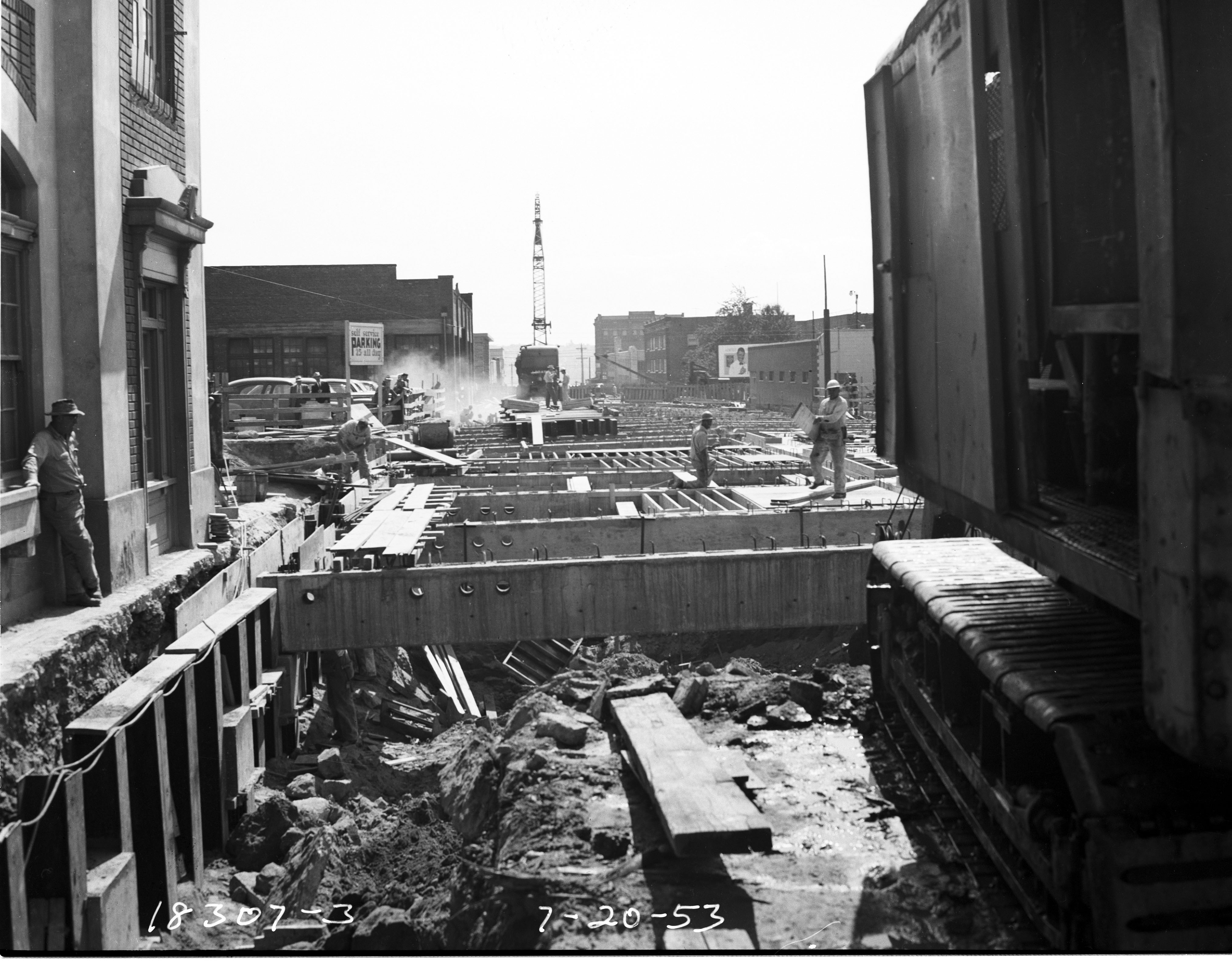
Construction of the Battery Street Tunnel at 4th Avenue, seen in July 1953

Within Downtown Seattle, US 99 was routed along 4th Avenue, connecting to the north with the Aurora Avenue expressway via 7th Avenue and to the south with East Marginal Way near Boeing Field. An alternate route was designated in the early 1950s along 1st Avenue, rejoining the highway in Georgetown. Congestion and difficulty in directing freight trucks through downtown led to proposals for a bypass route for US 99 as early as 1928 along Railroad Avenue on the city's waterfront. Railroad Avenue, later renamed Alaskan Way, was rebuilt in the 1930s as part of the federal government's improvements to the city seawall and became the primary bypass route for through traffic, experiencing major congestion as a result.

Formal proposals to build "motor viaducts" bypassing the city along Alaskan Way were submitted by the city engineering department in 1937 and supported by automobile and traffic safety groups. The bypass viaduct gained popularity following the end of World War II and engineering work was approved in 1947, with construction funds sourced from the city and the Federal-Aid Highway Act of 1944. A double-deck elevated design was chosen to accommodate the six lanes that would displace railroads along the east side of Alaskan Way. Construction on the Alaskan Way Viaduct began on February 6, 1950, and the first section between Railroad Way and Elliott Avenue opened to traffic on April 4, 1953. It cost approximately $8 million to construct (equivalent to $76.8 million in 2025 dollars), using pile-driven columns and a pair of moving gantry cranes to lift sections of the roadway from street level.

The Battery Street Tunnel, connecting the viaduct with the Aurora Avenue expressway, was opened to traffic on July 24, 1954, and cost $2.8 million to construct (equivalent to $26.6 million in 2025 dollars). A 2.3-mile (3.7 km) extension of the viaduct, linking south to a surface freeway and US 99 at East Marginal Way, cost $7.6 million to construct (equivalent to $72.2 million in 2025 dollars) and opened on September 3, 1959. The southern extension eased congestion at the Railroad Way terminus and was used by a daily average of 25,000 vehicles within days of opening and 37,000 vehicles by the end of the year. A series of ramps connecting the viaduct to the Spokane Street Viaduct were completed in January 1960, followed by a downtown offramp to Seneca Street in November 1961 and onramp from Columbia Street in February 1966. The state government had prepared to build a set of ramps from the viaduct to US 10 (later part of I-90) near Connecticut Street, but plans for the freeway were delayed in the 1960s and eventually abandoned, leaving the ramps unused.

The viaduct was initially signed as part of U.S. Route 99 Alternate and US 99 Bypass until 1959, when US 99 was formally switched to the viaduct after the completion of the southern extension. 4th Avenue was signed as a business route of US 99 and also carried a section of US 10 to its terminus at the north end of the Battery Street Tunnel. The East Marginal Way route through the Boeing Field area was heavily congested due to traffic heading to Boeing facilities, leading to proposals in the 1950s to build a new expressway on the west side of the Duwamish River. Construction of the two-lane West Marginal Way expressway began in November 1958 and was completed in July 1959, including grade-separated interchanges and bridges at South 118th Street, 14th Avenue South, and South Cloverdale Street. The expressway split from US 99 at South 118th Street and connected to 1st Avenue at the south end of the viaduct using the First Avenue South Bridge, which opened in 1956 with the intent of becoming part of US 99. In March 1959, the state government approved $3 million in funds (equivalent to $25.3 million in 2025 dollars) for an expansion project that would widen the West Marginal Way expressway to four lanes. The expansion was completed in 1968, and was signed as US 99 Temporary and later State Route 99T after the 1964 state highway renumbering.

=== Replacement and redesignation ===
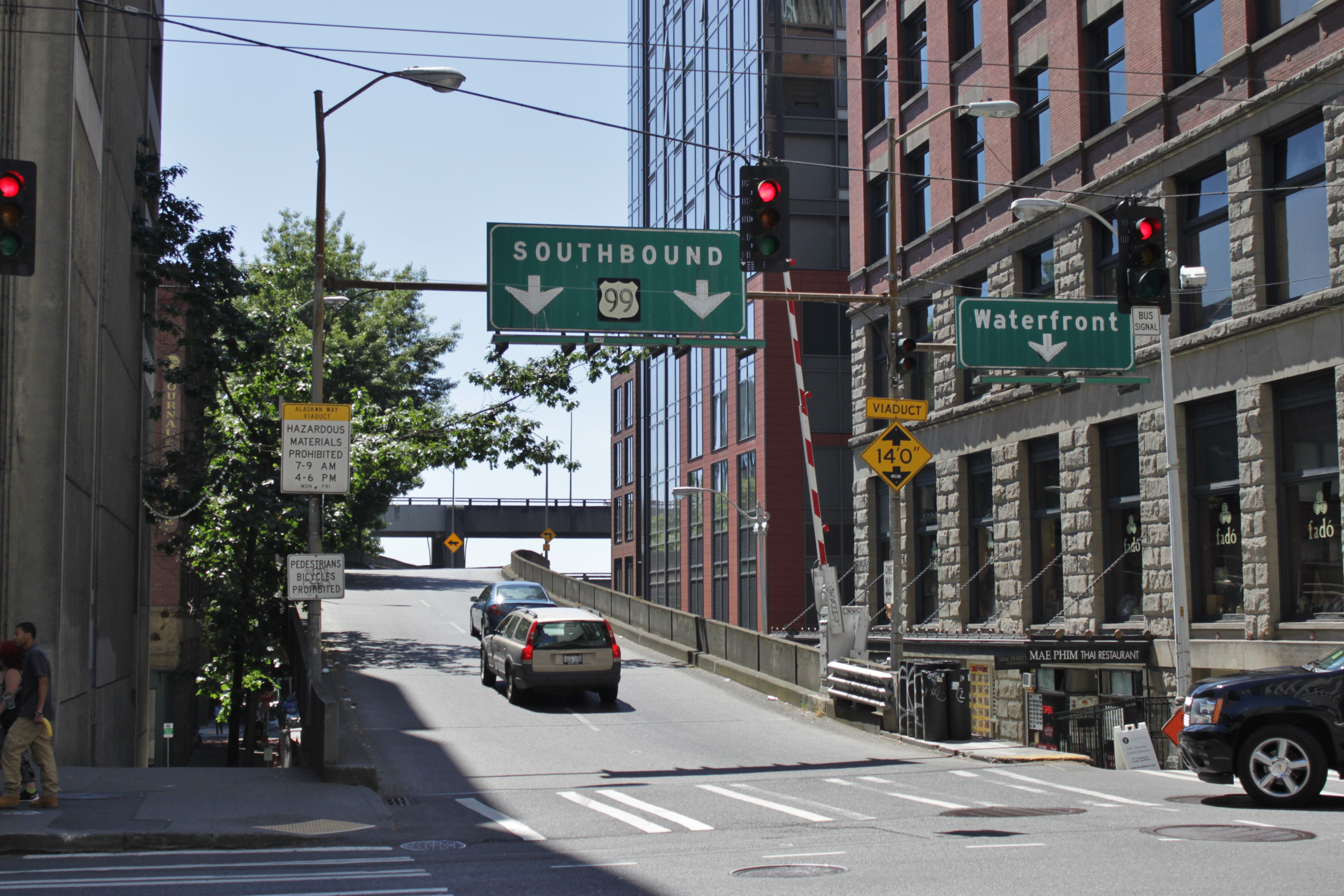
A US 99 sign in downtown Seattle, which remained above the Columbia Street onramp to the Alaskan Way Viaduct until its removal in 2019

The state legislature authorized planning of a tolled expressway from Tacoma to Everett in 1953, with the intent of building a grade-separated bypass of US 99. The tollway plan was superseded three years later by the Interstate Highway Program, which was authorized by the federal government and included a north–south freeway through the Seattle area replacing US 99. The route was designated as Interstate 5 in 1957 and planning for the Seattle Freeway began at the same time using federal funds.

The first section of the Tacoma–Seattle–Everett freeway to be built was in southern Tacoma and was opened to traffic in October 1959. The Tacoma sections opened in October 1962 from the Puyallup River to the Kent–Des Moines Road (now SR 516) in Midway, and in October 1964 in downtown Tacoma. Construction of the Seattle section began in 1958 with work on the Ship Canal Bridge, which was opened to traffic on December 18, 1962. The northern approach to Downtown Seattle was opened the following August to coincide with the completion of the Evergreen Point Floating Bridge and SR 520. A 20-mile (32 km) section of the freeway traveling from North Seattle to southern Snohomish County and Everett was opened to traffic on February 3, 1965. The freeway connecting Midway to the south side of Downtown Seattle was opened on January 31, 1967, completing the final section of the urban freeway. I-5 itself was completed two years later with the opening of the section between Everett and Marysville on May 14, 1969.

The state government introduced a new highway numbering system in 1964 to align with the Interstates and prepare for the decommissioning of U.S. routes. PSH 1 was replaced with US 99, which remained as a temporary designation on various freeway sections until I-5 was fully completed. US 99 was decommissioned at a meeting of the American Association of State Highway Officials on June 24, 1969, shortly after the full completion of I-5 within Washington state. While most US 99 signs were removed, an overhead sign in Downtown Seattle at the Columbia Street onramp to the Alaskan Way Viaduct remained until the viaduct was demolished in 2019.

During the 1970 codification of the new highway system, the state legislature created State Route 99 (SR 99) to delay transferring ownership and maintenance of the highway to local jurisdictions. SR 99 was created from a section of US 99 that ran from Fife to the Broadway Interchange in Everett, and was retained as a permanent addition to the state highway system in 1971 due to the corridor's importance to state affairs. A provision in the 1971 law allows for the abandonment of the Fife–Federal Way section of SR 99 after the completion of the SR 509 freeway extension. Instead of continuing north into Everett on Evergreen Way, SR 99 was routed northeasterly on Everett Mall Way, a section of the Broadway Cut-off (also named Diagonal Way) that opened in June 1954.

=== Street and bridge improvements ===
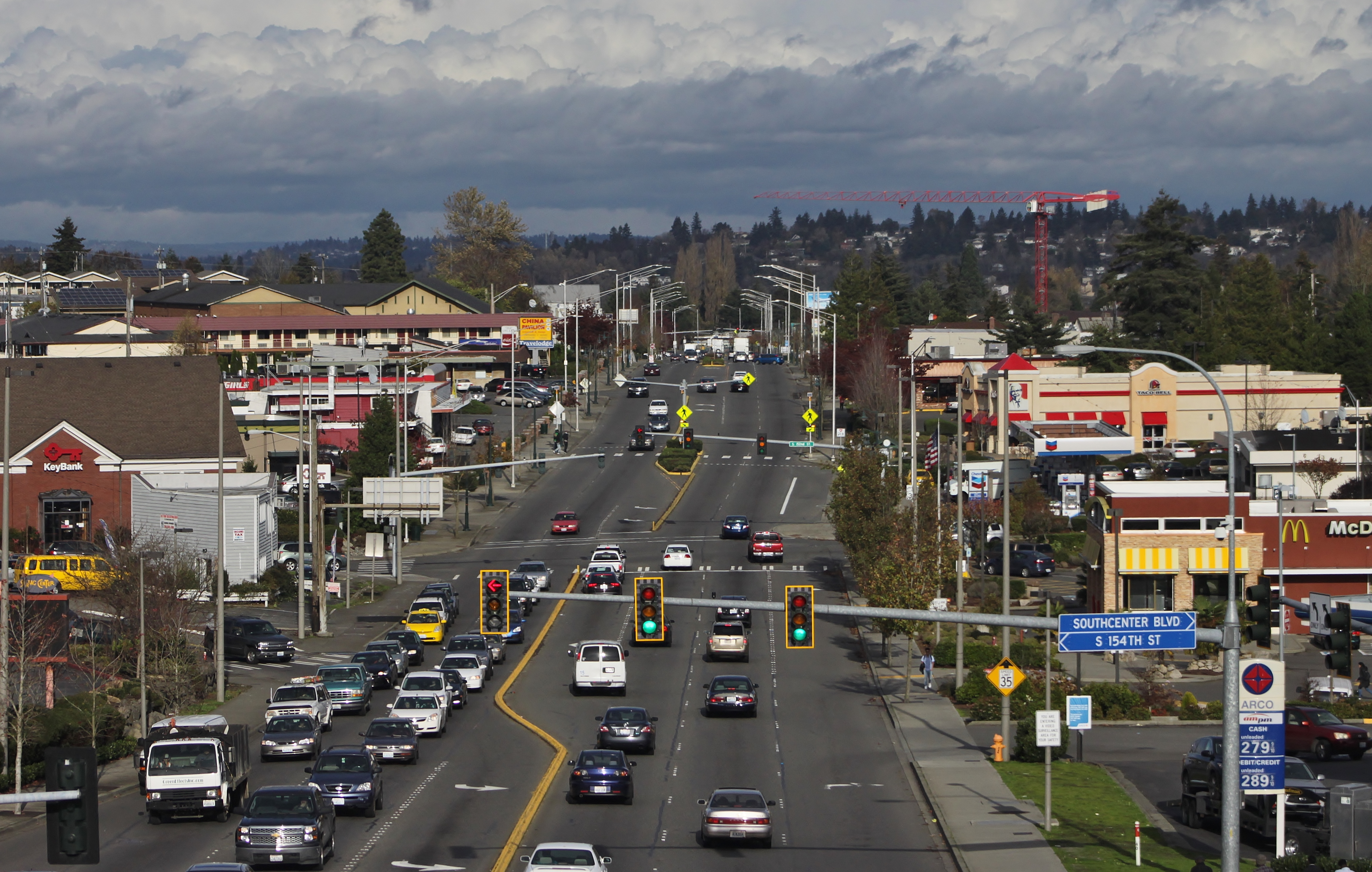
International Boulevard in Tukwila, formerly part of SR 99 until a jurisdictional transfer in 2004

Sections of SR 99 in North Seattle along Aurora Avenue and in South King County declined economically after the opening of Interstate 5, losing businesses amid increased crime. It became a notorious haven for drug dealers, prostitutes, the homeless, and strip clubs by the 1970s and 1980s. The 17-mile (27 km) stretch from Federal Way to Tukwila in South King County, popularly known as the "SeaTac Strip", was where the Green River Killer (Gary Ridgway) picked up many of his victims in the 1980s. The highway was also unsafe for pedestrians and cross-traffic due to the lack of crossings and improper management of utility lines and overgrown foliage.

In an effort to clean up sections of the corridor, various cities have undertaken reconstruction projects in the 1990s and 2000s to turn the highway into a landscaped boulevard. In southern King County, the cities of Federal Way, SeaTac, and Tukwila drew up redevelopment plans that were largely built out in the 2000s, reducing traffic collisions and crime while improving the area's appearance. After being denied permission to plant trees along SR 99, the city of Tukwila requested control of the highway within its city limits and was granted a jurisdictional transfer in 2004 by the state legislature, allowing them to redevelop 2.4 miles (3.9 km) of International Boulevard into a new street with traffic calming features.

The city of Shoreline was incorporated in 1995 and made the redevelopment of Aurora Avenue into an early priority, completing its $140 million modernization and multi-use trail project in stages between 2008 and 2017. The project included new traffic signals, BAT lanes, underground utility lines, and two pedestrian bridges. Edmonds plans to add widened sidewalks with planted buffer zones, new crosswalks, and turn lane pockets to its 2.5-mile (4.0 km) section of SR 99 beginning in 2022. The city of Seattle also plans to improve its section of Aurora Avenue North, but funding shortages and the timing of WSDOT repaving projects have led to a lack of sidewalks along some sections of the street. The Move Ahead Washington package, passed in 2022, includes $50 million in funds to rebuild sections of Aurora Avenue to include sidewalks, bicycle lanes, and landscaping.

The Aurora Bridge, part of the expressway linking Aurora Avenue to downtown Seattle, was the site of frequent suicide jumps until a set of emergency phones and new fences were installed in 2011 at a cost of $4.6 million to deter would-be jumpers. The bridge and its expansion joints underwent a major seismic retrofit that was completed in 2012 at a cost of $5.7 million; the retrofit was followed by a repainting and repaving project that was completed in two stages between 2016 and 2018 at a cost of $35 million. On September 24, 2015, a collision between an amphibious Duck tour vehicle and a charter bus on the Aurora Bridge killed four people and injured 50 more. The incident raised questions regarding the safety of Aurora Bridge, which lacks a median barrier and is the narrowest six-lane bridge in the state, with a lane width of 9.5 feet (2.9 m). Other sections of Aurora Avenue were retrofitted to install median barriers in 1973, and the state government considered a 2003 plan to put barriers on the bridge and relocate the sidewalks to compensate for the additional weight but ultimately deferred any improvements. In the aftermath of the crash and its three-year-long court case, WSDOT and the Seattle Department of Transportation have disagreed over whether to install a center barrier or median zipper system, and which agency would be responsible for funding either option.

=== Viaduct replacement and tunnel project ===
==== Proposals and earthquake studies ====
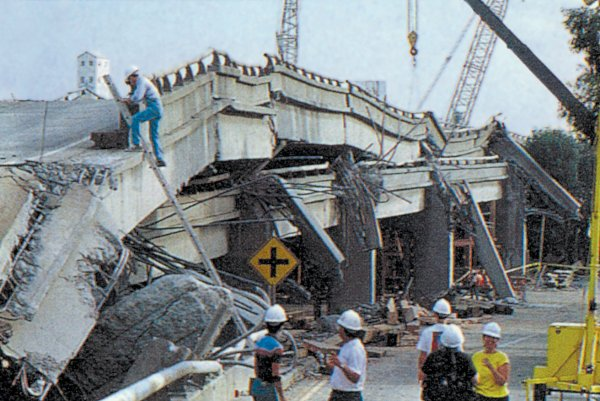
The 1989 collapse of the Cypress Street Viaduct in Oakland, California, triggered investigations into the seismic vulnerability of the Alaskan Way Viaduct.

Proposals to replace the Alaskan Way Viaduct date back to the 1970s during attempts to revitalize the city's waterfront for tourism and recreation rather than traditional industrial uses. A similar double-decker freeway, the Cypress Street Viaduct in Oakland, California, collapsed during the Loma Prieta earthquake in 1989 and killed 42 people, leading to intensified calls to replace the viaduct due to the realized earthquake risk. A 1995 study commissioned by the state government after the Kobe earthquake found vulnerabilities in the Alaskan Way Viaduct's design that could cause severe damage and collapse during a major earthquake, along with liquefaction risks due to the underlying reclaimed land that the highway was built on. The study estimated that it would cost $118 million (equivalent to $209 million in 2025 dollars) to demolish the viaduct, $344 million (equivalent to $610 million in 2025 dollars) to retrofit the structure for earthquake resistance, and $530 million (equivalent to $940 million in 2025 dollars) to build a new elevated freeway to replace it; other options included replacing the freeway with a tunnel or a surface boulevard with public transit on Alaskan Way, similar to San Francisco's Embarcadero.

On February 28, 2001, the Nisqually earthquake struck the Seattle area with strong shaking that caused signs of visible damage on the Alaskan Way Viaduct. The freeway was shut down for inspections, which found small cracks and other minor damage to non-structural elements that allowed it to reopen within 26 hours. Four more closures were ordered later in March and April due to pieces of concrete dropping onto the streets below, requiring emergency repairs to add steel rods to reinforce the columns. The first repairs were completed in November at a cost of $1.8 million and a set of new vehicle weight restrictions were implemented; in total, $14.5 million was spent on various repairs due to earthquake damage. Annual inspections and continued monitoring found that the earthquake had caused settling of up to 4 inches (10 cm) into the soil and weakened connections between the columns and highway decks. Additional investigations also found unrelated damage to the underlying seawall, which would need to be rebuilt to prevent a resulting collapse of the viaduct.

An ongoing state study investigating a viaduct replacement strategy was accelerated by the state legislature using $5 million in funds, while a separate engineering study suggested immediate demolition of the structure due to a 1-in-20 chance of collapse in an earthquake within the next decade. In late 2001, WSDOT began work on an environmental impact statement (EIS) for the viaduct replacement project using emergency funds from the state legislature and consulted the city government and community leaders to generate concepts. By the following year, a set of 76 concepts organized into four general alternatives were presented for public feedback. Among the options were an elevated freeway similar to the current viaduct and several tunnel concepts, including a bored tunnel, a two-level cut-and-cover tunnel, and a mined tunnel carrying one direction of traffic. Five finalist options were paired with the seawall replacement and evaluated in June 2002, with costs ranging from $3.5 billion for a rebuilt viaduct to $8.8–$11.6 billion for various tunnel designs.

==== Tunnel concept, advisory votes, and subprojects ====
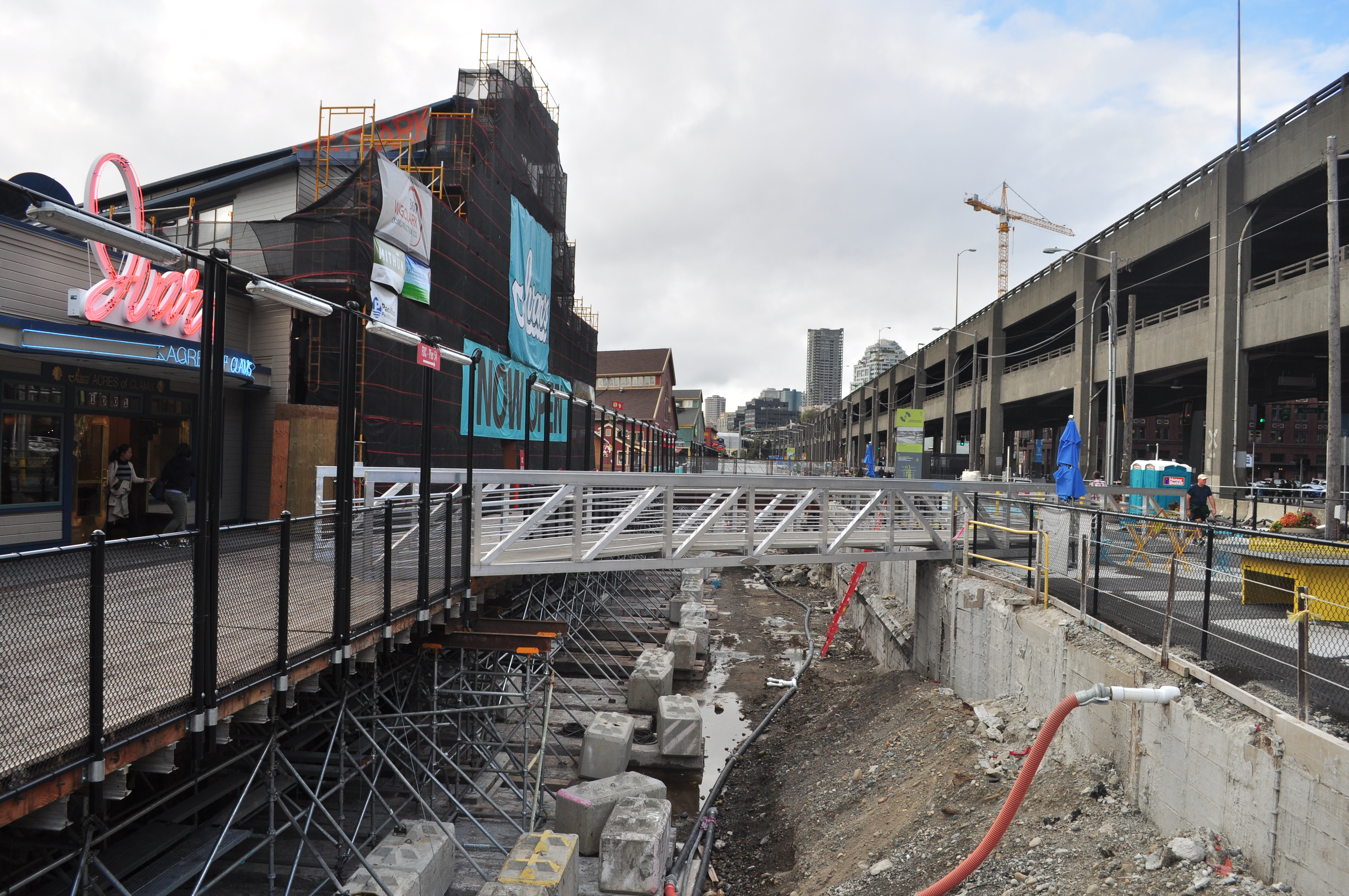
Reconstruction of the Alaskan Way Seawall, pictured in 2015

The tunnel plan was endorsed by WSDOT and the city council based on public support for waterfront revitalization, but design changes would be needed to bring down its cost. After voters rejected a statewide gas tax referendum that would have funded a portion of the project's cost, WSDOT and the city government drafted new cost-saving concepts for a shorter tunnel and a surface boulevard that were included in the five options evaluated by the draft EIS in 2004. The six-lane, $4 billion tunnel option was chosen as the preferred alternative by WSDOT in late 2004, despite backlash from activists groups who favored a rebuilt viaduct or a waterfront boulevard.

The state legislature passed an $8.5 billion gas tax program in 2005, allocating $2 billion in funding for the viaduct replacement. A supplemental EIS was prepared in 2006 to include new project requirements for the Battery Street Tunnel area and evaluate the cut-and-cover tunnel and elevated options. A pair of advisory, non-binding ballot measures was held in March 2007 to find a consensus between the $2.8 billion elevated replacement supported by Governor Christine Gregoire and a smaller four-lane tunnel with surface public transit improvements that would cost $3.4 billion and was supported by Mayor Greg Nickels; Nickel's "hybrid tunnel" proposal was rejected by Gregoire and state legislators prior to the vote based on operational and safety problems identified by WSDOT. Both options were rejected by voters, with 70 percent opposed to the tunnel and 55 percent opposed to the elevated concept.

The governments of Washington state, King County, and Seattle agreed to re-evaluate the planning process for the viaduct replacement and split the main proposals from essential safety and traffic improvements that would be included in all alternatives. A $915 million package of projects was approved for immediate construction, beginning with work to strengthen sinking columns in late 2007 and repairs to the Battery Street Tunnel the following year. Although the column strengthening project was declared successful, further inspections found that the Columbia Street onramp had sunk an additional 1/8 inch (0.32 cm) during the nearby construction. The southernmost stretch of the viaduct, between Holgate and King streets, was demolished in October 2011 and replaced with a six-lane elevated freeway that opened the following year at a cost of $115 million. Seattle voters approved a bond measure in 2012 to replace the Alaskan Way Seawall; the project began construction in 2013 and was completed in 2017 at a cost of $410 million, running 21 percent overbudget.

==== Deep-bored tunnel approved and contested ====
The state government announced a new timeline for the project in January 2008, with Governor Gregoire declaring her intention to demolish the viaduct by 2012 regardless of Seattle's approval. Eight new concepts for a four-lane replacement were developed by June from a set of priorities developed for SR 99, I-5, and public transit in downtown. The eight options included two surface boulevards with transit improvements, a one-way couplet, a set of two elevated freeways, an elevated freeway with a rooftop park, and three tunnels: a cut-and-cover tunnel, a lidded trench, and a deep-bored tunnel. Several early concepts, including a bridge across Elliott Bay and a complete rebuild of the double-decked viaduct, were rejected by the panel of public officials. The final decision was delayed until after the gubernatorial election, but would have to meet an end-of-year deadline imposed by the state legislature. In December 2008, two finalists were chosen for further study and consideration by the state legislature: a $2.3 billion elevated freeway and the $2.2 billion surface-transit option.

While the deep-bored tunnel was not chosen as one of the two finalists, it remained popular with tunnel activists and was considered separately due to its $4.25 billion cost (equivalent to $6.19 billion in 2025 dollars). On January 13, 2009, Governor Gregoire signed an agreement with Mayor Nickels and King County Executive Ron Sims to ratify the deep-bored tunnel as the replacement for the Alaskan Way Viaduct, to be completed by 2015. $2.8 billion would be covered by state gas taxes and federal funds, leaving a $1.4 billion shortfall to be filled by the local government and potential tolls. The state legislature passed a bill in April 2009 to commit $2.8 billion in state funding for the tunnel project, which Governor Gregoire signed the following month. In total, more than 90 alternatives were considered before the final agreement was reached in 2009.

The tunnel project received $300 million in funds from the Port of Seattle in exchange for design input on the surface boulevard that would replace Alaskan Way. Neighborhood and environmental activist Mike McGinn was elected mayor in 2009, largely on an anti-tunnel platform, and threatened to veto project agreements until the state took responsibility for cost overruns that would fall upon Seattle. The city council approved a non-binding resolution to authorize the tunnel project, pending the outcome of contract bidding, which was completed in December 2010 with the selection of Seattle Tunnel Partners (STP), a consortium led by Dragados USA. STP presented a $1.09 billion plan to use a 58-foot-diameter (18 m) tunnel boring machine, the world's widest, to complete the tunnel by late 2015. WSDOT signed the tunnel construction contract in January 2011, sending a set of contractor agreements to the city council for approval.

The state's agreements were approved by the city council in February 2011, shortly before being symbolically vetoed by Mayor McGinn; the veto was overridden by the end of the month—the 10th anniversary of the Nisqually earthquake—with an 8–1 city council majority. McGinn joined other tunnel opposition groups to file a referendum questioning whether the city council had the authority to approve the state and federal agreements. The referendum was initially blocked by a lawsuit filed by the city, but was approved and placed on the August 2011 ballot by a county judge. The referendum was approved by 58 percent of voters on August 16, 2011, authorizing the city's agreements with WSDOT. The Federal Highway Administration completed its analysis of the project's final EIS and issued its record of decision with WSDOT later that month, allowing pre-construction activities to begin.

==== Tunnel boring and viaduct closure ====
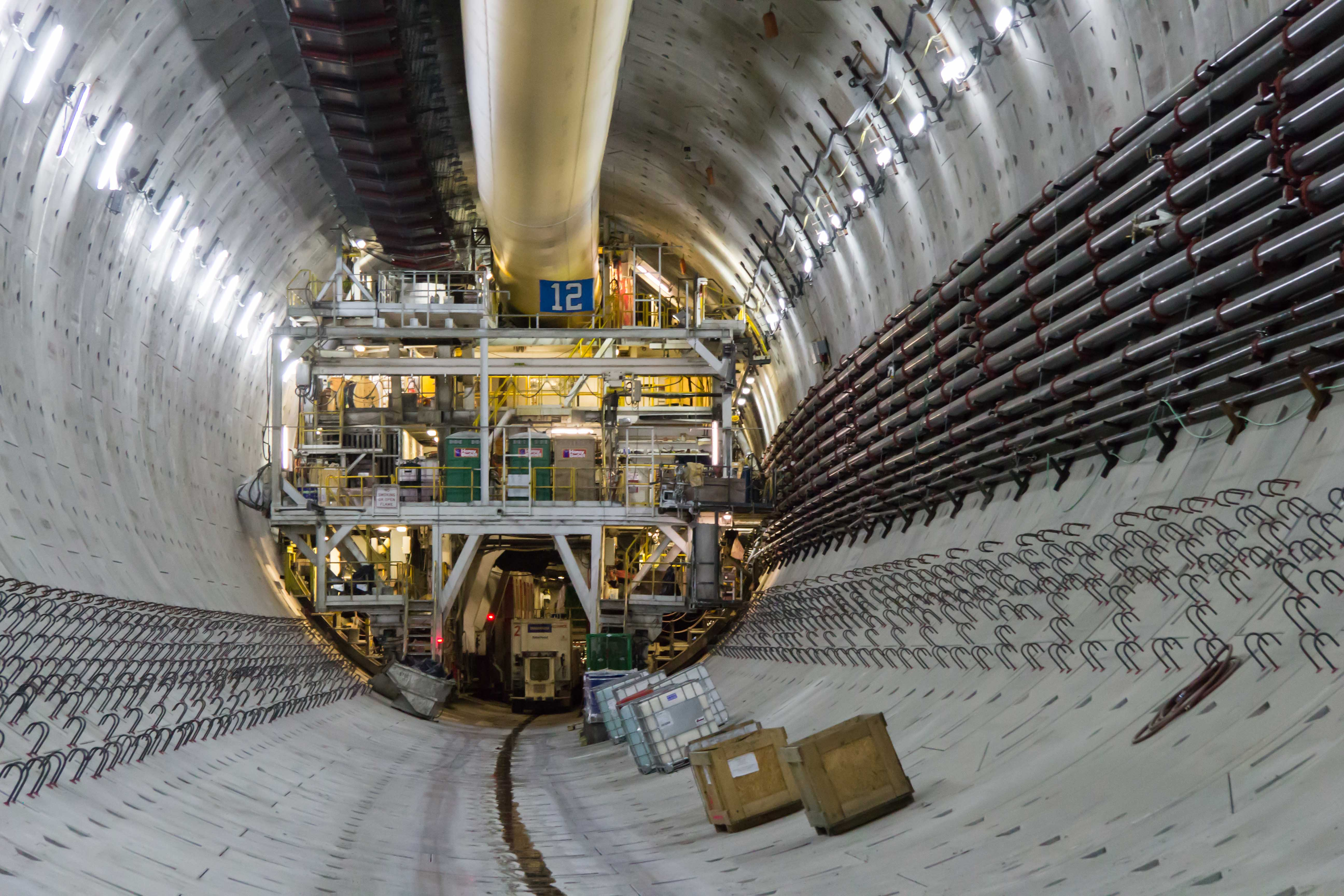
The backside of Bertha the tunnel boring machine and the unfinished interior of the SR 99 tunnel, seen in January 2017

After the demolition of the viaduct's southernmost stretch and its lanes were realigned onto an adjacent bypass in 2012, crews began excavation of a 420-foot-long (130 m) launch pit to house the tunnel boring machine. Local officials, with the notable absence of Mayor Mike McGinn, participated in a ceremonial groundbreaking was held for the tunnel on June 20, 2012. The 57-foot (17 m) tunnel boring machine was manufactured by Hitachi Zosen in Osaka, Japan, and named "Bertha" in honor of Mayor Bertha Knight Landes. Bertha arrived in Seattle on April 2, 2013, and its 40 pieces were assembled in the launch pit before tunnel boring began on July 30—setting a record for the world's largest tunnel boring machine.

Tunnel boring was halted at 1,028 feet (313 m) near South Main Street in December 2013 after the machine encountered an unknown object that caused it to overheat. The object was found to be a 119-foot (36 m) steel pipe and well casing that was left behind by a groundwater research crew for the project in 2002. The pipe caused extensive damage to Bertha's cutterhead and main bearing seal, requiring the excavation of a 120-foot (37 m) rescue pit for repairs. Bertha reached the completed excavation pit in March 2015 and the machine's front end was disassembled and lifted to the surface to repair the damage, which was found to be more extensive than previously thought.

The repaired cutterhead was lowered into the access pit in August 2015 and tunnel boring resumed on December 22, 2015, reaching past the pit the following month. During the two-year halt in tunnel boring, public officials considered alternative plans to accelerate demolition of the viaduct while awaiting tunnel completion. The project was named one of the worst boondoggles in the United States by several transportation groups and critics, due in part to the stoppage and its high cost. Tunnel boring was halted by Governor Jay Inslee in January 2016 due to the appearance of a sinkhole in Pioneer Square, but resumed the following month. The machine passed under the Alaskan Way Viaduct in April 2016, requiring a closure while the structure was monitored for movement, and reached the halfway mark in October. Bertha completed its 1.75-mile (2.82 km) bore on April 4, 2017, arriving at the north portal near Aurora Avenue for disassembly, which was completed in August. The tunnel portals and their maintenance areas were completed while work on the double-decker freeway inside the tunnel progressed behind the machine.

The Alaskan Way Viaduct permanently closed on January 11, 2019, beginning a three-week realignment of ramps at the portals as ramps were prepared for the opening of the tolled downtown tunnel on February 4, 2019. The remaining 1.4-mile (2.3 km) section of the viaduct was demolished in stages between February and November 2019, with some of the 240 million pounds (110,000,000 kg) of rubble deposited into the Battery Street Tunnel as it was filled and sealed. A three-block section of Aurora Avenue between Denny Way and the new tunnel portal was raised and reconnected to cross-streets in 2019. The Alaskan Way promenade and boulevard project was completed in 2025 and cost $800 million to construct using a ix of city, state, and private contributions. It spans 20 acres (8.1 ha) and includes prominent pedestrian features, such as the Overlook Walk near Pike Place Market, as well as bicycle lanes. The rebuilt section of Alaskan Way is four lanes wide for most of its length but expands to eight lanes near Colman Dock to accommodate ferry queueing and bus lanes. The viaduct replacement megaproject is estimated to cost $3.3 billion, with $200 million of construction costs and additional funds for ongoing maintenance to be raised through tunnel tolls that began to be collected on November 9, 2019.

=== Future projects ===
In 2022, community activists from the South Park neighborhood proposed removing a freeway section of SR 99 between SR 599 and SR 509 to improve local air quality. A federal grant was announced the following year to study the impact of a possible removal or redesign of the highway through South Park.

== Names and designations ==
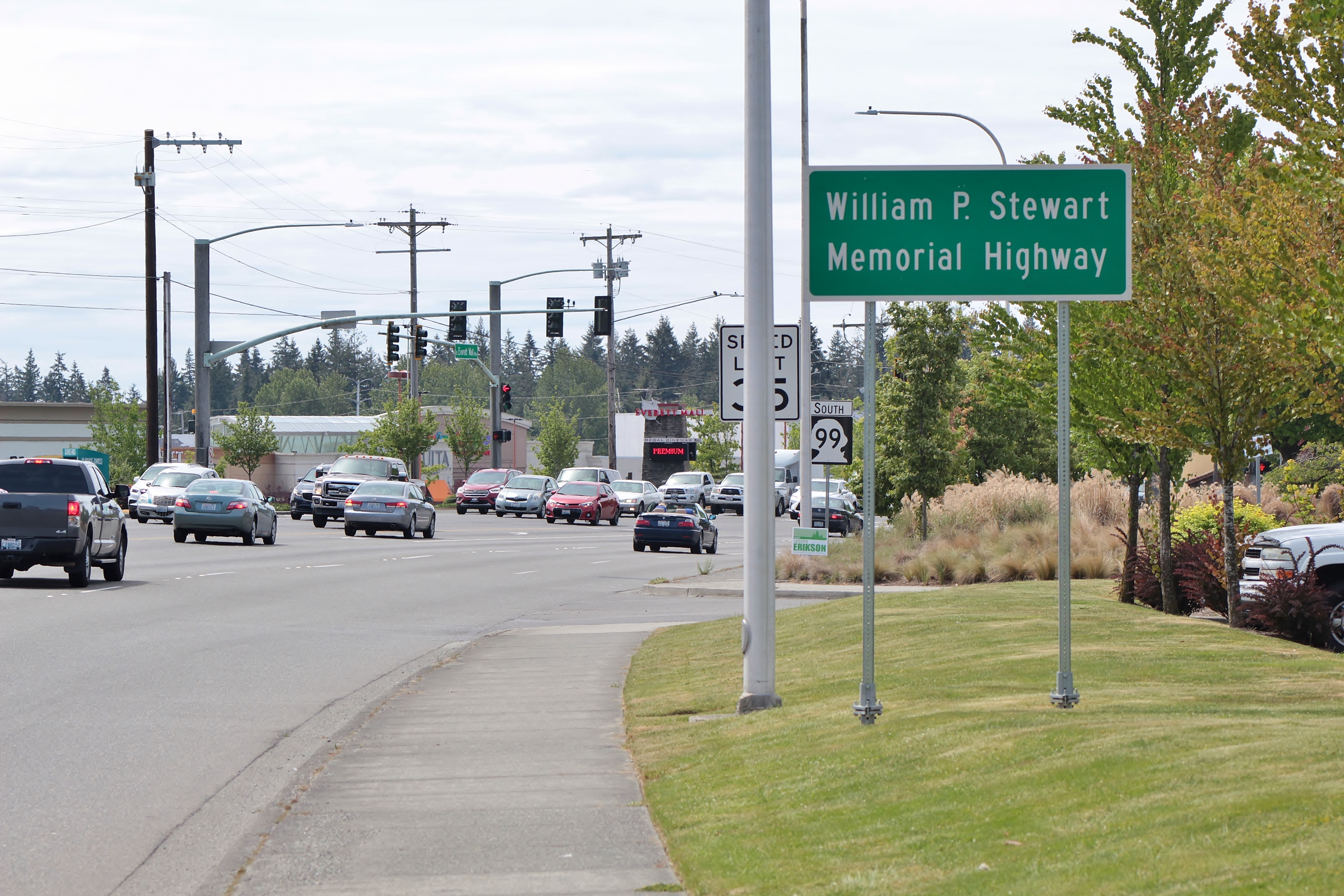
A highway sign for the William P. Stewart Memorial Highway in Everett, installed in 2017

The name of SR 99 differs from city to city, with several sections named the Pacific Highway and International Boulevard, a moniker invented by SeaTac for the 1990 Goodwill Games hosted by King County. In Seattle, the highway is known as East Marginal Way and Aurora Avenue North; in Everett, it uses Evergreen Way and Everett Mall Way. A four-block section of former SR 99 between Denny Way and the new tunnel portal was renamed to 7th Avenue North and Borealis Avenue in early 2019 as part of the reconfiguration of Aurora Avenue.

The United Daughters of the Confederacy unsuccessfully lobbied the state legislature in 1939 to designate the entirety of US 99 within the state as part of the national "Jefferson Davis Highway". A pair of granite markers were installed the following year in Blaine and Vancouver to commemorate the highway, allegedly to recognize Davis's contributions to the territorial development of Washington as U.S. Secretary of War. The two markers were removed in 1998 and 2002, and are now located at the privately owned Jefferson Davis Park in Ridgefield.

The State House of Representatives unanimously approved a bill in 2002 that would have removed Davis' name from the road, but it was deferred by a State Senate committee. The attempted renaming, led by Snohomish representative Hans Dunshee, generated political controversy and death threats against legislators from people opposed to the bill. The bill was revived in May 2016 and was passed unanimously by both houses of the legislature, renaming SR 99 for William P. Stewart, an African-American Civil War veteran and early settler in Snohomish. New highway signs for the William P. Stewart Memorial Highway were installed the following year, amid a new wave of Confederate monument removals.

== Public transit ==
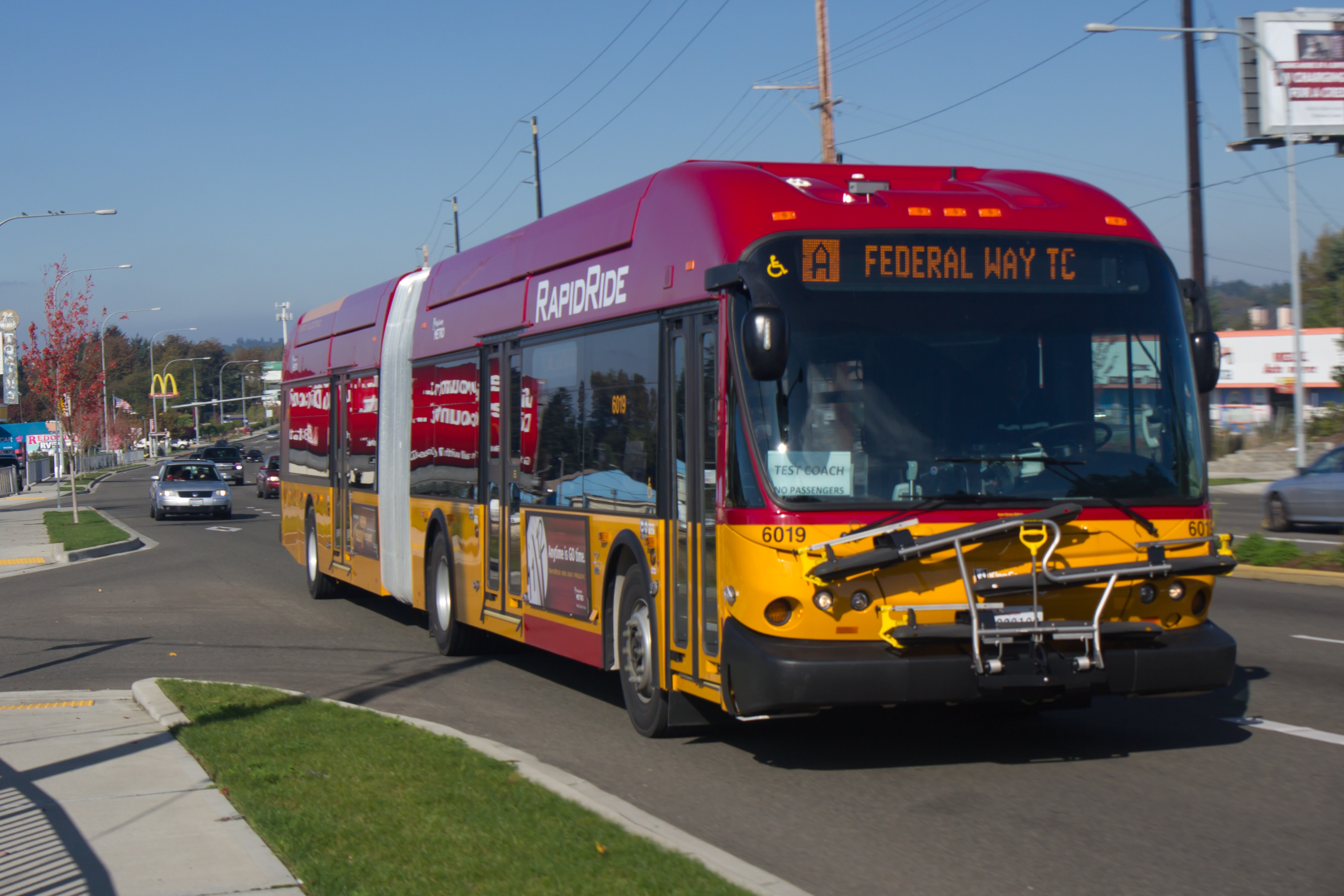
The RapidRide A Line, operated by King County Metro between Federal Way and Tukwila

SR 99 is a major regional public transit corridor and carries several bus rapid transit routes and a light rail line in SeaTac. The highway features bus lanes and business access and transit lanes (BAT lanes) in several locations to give buses traffic priority while retaining access to right turns.

Pierce Transit route 500 runs on the SR 99 and Pacific Highway corridor between Tacoma Dome Station and Federal Way Transit Center. Through Federal Way and SeaTac, the highway is served by the RapidRide A Line, an 11-mile (18 km) rapid bus route that debuted in 2010 and features enhanced bus stops and transit signal priority. Sound Transit's Link light rail trains on the 1 Line run along elevated tracks above or near SR 99 from Angle Lake station to Tukwila International Boulevard station at the SR 518 interchange. The Alaskan Way Viaduct carried several non-stop routes connecting Downtown Seattle to West Seattle (including the RapidRide C Line) and Burien.

Aurora Avenue is served by the RapidRide E Line, which carried 18,000 passengers daily in 2017 and is the busiest bus route in the King County Metro system. The E Line debuted in 2014, replacing Route 358—itself the successor to Route 359, which was retired in 1999 after a Metro bus was involved in a shooting and crashed off the Aurora Bridge. The E Line terminates in Downtown Seattle and near the county line at the Aurora Village Transit Center, where Community Transit's route 101 and Swift Blue Line begins. Swift features off-board fare payment and longer spacing between stops, and runs from Shoreline to Everett Station via Evergreen Way. The Everett Mall Way section of SR 99 is served by Everett Transit route 7, which connects the Everett Mall to Downtown Everett and Everett Station.

== Major intersections ==
County	Location	mi	km	Destinations	Notes
Pierce	Fife	0.00	0.00	I-5 – Seattle, Tacoma	
Pierce	Milton	1.62	2.61	Porter Way	Former SR 514
King	Federal Way	4.49	7.23	SR 18 east (South 348th Street) to I-5 – Auburn, North Bend	
King	Federal Way	7.72	12.42	SR 509 south (South Dash Point Road) – Dash Point State Park	South end of SR 509 concurrency
King	Des Moines	11.84	19.05	SR 516 / SR 509 north to I-5 – Des Moines, Kent	North end of SR 509 concurrency
King	SeaTac	15.11	24.32	South 182nd Street – Sea–Tac Airport	
King	SeaTac–Tukwila city line	16.78	27.00	SR 518 to I-5 / I-405 – Renton, Burien	Interchange
King	Gap in route, continues as Tukwila International Boulevard				
King	Tukwila	16.79	27.02	SR 599 south to I-5	Continuation south
King	Tukwila	16.79	27.02	South 116th Street / Tukwila International Boulevard	Interchange; south end of freeway section
King	Tukwila	17.61	28.34	West Marginal Place South	Northbound exit and entrance
King	Seattle	18.63	29.98	Des Moines Memorial Drive / 14th Avenue South	
King	Seattle	19.22	30.93	South Cloverdale Street	Northbound entrance only
King	Seattle	19.56	31.48	South Kenyon Street – South Park	Southbound exit and entrance
King	Seattle	20.23	32.56	SR 509 south / West Marginal Way South – Burien	Interchange
King	Duwamish River	20.27– 20.82	32.62– 33.51	First Avenue South Bridge	
King	Seattle	20.60	33.15	To I-5 via Michigan Street	Northbound exit and southbound entrance
King	Seattle	20.60	33.15	North end of freeway	
King	Seattle	22.41	36.07	Spokane Street – West Seattle, Waterfront, Port Terminals	Northbound exit and southbound entrance
King	Seattle	22.41	36.07	South end of freeway	
King	Seattle	22.80	36.69	West Seattle Bridge – Harbor Island	Southbound exit and northbound entrance
King	Seattle	23.96	38.56	SR 519 to I-5 / I-90 / Alaskan Way South, South Dearborn Street – Downtown Seattle	Southbound exit and northbound entrance
King	Seattle	24.18– 26.26	38.91– 42.26	Alaskan Way (SR 99) Tunnel	
King	Seattle	26.18	42.13	Republican Street, 6th Avenue North – Mercer Street, Seattle Center	Northbound exit and southbound entrance
King	Seattle	26.44	42.55	Aurora Avenue – Denny Way, Downtown Seattle	Southbound exit and northbound entrance; north end of freeway
King	Lake Union	27.75– 28.31	44.66– 45.56	George Washington Memorial Bridge	
King	Seattle	28.43	45.75	North 38th Street	Interchange
King	Seattle	29.05	46.75	North 46th Street	Interchange
King	Seattle	29.88	48.09	North 63rd Street / Green Lake Way	Interchange
King	Seattle–Shoreline city line	34.05	54.80	SR 523 east (North 145th Street) to I-5	
King–Snohomish county line	Shoreline–Edmonds city line	37.07	59.66	SR 104 Spur east to SR 104 east / I-5 – Mountlake Terrace, Lake Forest Park	
Snohomish	Edmonds	37.18	59.84	SR 104 to I-5 – Edmonds, Kingston Ferry, Mountlake Terrace, Lake Forest Park	Interchange
Snohomish	Lynnwood	40.42	65.05	SR 524 (196th Street Southwest)	
Snohomish		44.20	71.13	SR 525 to I-5 south / I-405 south / Alderwood Mall Parkway – Mukilteo, Whidbey Island Ferry	Interchange
Snohomish	Everett	48.80– 48.97	78.54– 78.81	I-5 – Seattle, Vancouver, BC	
Snohomish	Everett	48.97	78.81	SR 526 west / SR 527 south / Broadway	Continues north as Broadway
1.000 mi = 1.609 km; 1.000 km = 0.621 mi: Concurrency terminus; Electronic toll collection; Incomplete access
