= Seattle Southside =

Seattle Southside is a region of Western Washington, officially made up of the cities of SeaTac, Tukwila and Des Moines, Washington. In addition to the primary cities, the term is loosely used to describe other cities including: Burien, Normandy Park, White Center, Georgetown, South Seattle, Columbia City, Kent, and Federal Way. The area is marketed as a travel destination by Seattle Southside Regional Tourism Authority (RTA) and Seattle Southside Chamber of Commerce claims to represent business interests.

Seattle Southside is home to a variety of attractions near Seattle, including The Museum of Flight, Westfield Southcenter, iFLY Indoor Skydiving, Des Moines Beach Park, Family Fun Center, Starfire Sports, Highline SeaTac Botanical Garden and others.

Seattle Southside surrounds Seattle–Tacoma International Airport and includes the most diverse ZIP Code in Washington State. The diversity in the area is reflected in the available international cuisine, including Ethiopian, Japanese, Thai, Italian, Mexican, Greek, Indian, Taiwanese, and other cuisines.
