= Julia Keefe =

Nez Perce jazz vocalist

- Born: Kamiah, Idaho, U.S.
- Citizenship: Nez Perce Tribe and U.S.
- Education: University of Miami; Manhattan School of Music
- Relatives: Claudia Kauffman (aunt)
- Website: juliakeefe.com

Julia Keefe is a Nez Perce (Nimiipuu) jazz vocalist based in New York City.

== Early life and education ==
Keefe was born and raised in Kamiah, Idaho, on a Nez Perce reservation. Keefe was introduced to the music of Billie Holiday at a young age and cites Holiday as a primary inspiration. Keefe's father is of Irish descent, and she is the niece of Senator Claudia Kauffman.

She moved to Spokane, Washington, in 2000. While attending Gonzaga Preparatory School, Keefe discovered Mildred Bailey, whom Keefe continues to research and has done tribute performances to.

Keefe received her Bachelors of Music from the University of Miami’s Frost School of Music in 2012. In 2019 she received her Masters of Music from the Manhattan School of Music, studying under the tutelage of Theo Bleckmann, Dave Liebman, and Kate McGarry.

== Career ==
In 2009, Keefe performed at the National Museum of the American Indian during Jazz Appreciation Month in a show titled “Thoroughly Modern: Mildred Bailey Songs”, a tribute to Mildred Bailey. In 2024, Keefe released Mildred Bailey Project, a full length album dedicated to the music of Bailey.

In May 2022, Keefe premiered the Julia Keefe Indigenous Big Band at the Washington Center for the Performing Arts in Olympia. The ensemble is composed entirely of Indigenous musicians including Mali Obomsawin and Marc Cary. The Julia Keefe Indigenous Big Band released their first album, Incarnadine, on May 8, 2026.

== Discography ==
as Julia Keefe

Title	Details	Type	Reference
Mildred Bailey Project	Label: Frybread Records; Release date: 2024	Studio Album	

with Julia Keefe Indigenous Big Band

Title	Details	Type	Reference
Incarnadine	Release date: May 8, 2026	Studio Album	
