= Joe Fain =

American politician (born 1980)

Member of the Washington Senate from the 47th district
- In office January 10, 2011 – January 14, 2019
- Preceded by: Claudia Kauffman
- Succeeded by: Mona Das

Personal details
- Born: Joseph Frederick Fain; December 23, 1980 (age 45) Des Moines, Washington, U.S.
- Party: Republican
- Spouse: Steffanie Moxon (m. 2010)
- Children: 2
- Education: University of Washington (BA); Seattle University (JD, MBA)

Joseph Frederick Fain (born December 23, 1980) is an American lawyer and politician who served as a member of the Washington State Senate for the 47th district from 2011 to 2019. Fain was elected in 2010 and re-elected in 2014. Fain served as the senate minority floor leader during the 2018 legislative session.

In 2018, Fain was defeated by Democrat Mona Das.

== Early life and education ==
Fain was born and raised in King County, Washington. Both of Fain's parents were public school teachers. He received a Bachelor of Arts degree in political science from the University of Washington and later earned a Juris Doctor and Masters of Business Administration from Seattle University.

== Career ==
Fain coached high school swimming in the Renton and Highline School Districts and was recognized as the 2002 "Washington State Swim Coach of the Year."

Fain previously served as the chief of staff for King County Councilmember Pete von Reichbauer, who represents the 7th District that includes much of South and Southeast King County.

In 2008, Fain sponsored a successful initiative that sought to break through hyper-partisanship in King County government. Initiative 26 was supported by The Seattle Times, The Seattle PI, the Greater Seattle Chamber of Commerce, and the Municipal League of King County. It passed with 56% of the vote, making the offices of King County Executive, Council, and Assessor nonpartisan.

=== Washington Senate ===
Fain was the youngest elected member of the Washington State Senate and served on the Senate's Transportation, Early Learning and K-12 Education, and Financial Institutions, Housing and Insurance committees. Fain also served as vice-chair the Legislative Evaluations and Accountable Program which is the legislature's source of budget data and analysis.

Prior to the 2013 session, Fain was elected as the Senate's majority floor leader and named to the Senate majority's leadership team, transportation budget leadership cabinet and Rules Committee.

In 2011, Fain worked with fellow South King County lawmakers to allocate funding to the King County Flood Control District for repairing homes and businesses damaged during extended flooding. In 2012, he secured additional money in the state's capital construction budget for the Briscoe and Desimone levees.

Fain has also worked to secure transportation funding for new infrastructure throughout South King County aimed at increasing road capacity and improving freight mobility. The 2011 and 2012 transportation budgets included money for major thoroughfares like I-5, I-405, SR 167 and SR 18, in addition to surface street maintenance and safety improvements in Kent, Auburn and Covington.

In 2013, Fain spearheaded an effort to restore funding for state food assistance, which provides grocery money for low-income immigrant families. By working with Democratic and Republican colleagues he was able to secure an additional $9 million in the new state budget to increase benefits by 50 percent.

As majority floor leader, Fain was also successful at bringing the Safe Streets Bill up for a vote ahead of a deadline for passing legislation. The measure makes it simpler for cities to reduce speed limits on neighborhood streets, greatly improving public safety for pedestrians, bicyclists and other motorists.

The Legislature improved security at Washington's courthouses through a plan co-sponsored and advocated by Fain. The bill increased the penalty for assault on courthouse property and allows judges to consider the location during sentencing. Fain worked with colleagues in the Legislature and Washington's Attorney General Bob Ferguson to enact the changes.

A temporary increase of the state's business and occupation and beer tax was scheduled to end in June 2013, but Washington's governor and House of Representatives proposed making these permanent. With improving revenues and a growing state economy Fain worked with colleagues and stakeholders to ensure the increases ended as scheduled, reducing the burden on small- and medium-sized businesses statewide.

=== Post-electoral career ===
After losing reelection, he was selected as the CEO of the Bellevue Chamber of Commerce in 2019. In 2025, he lost a bid to join the board of directors for public news radio station KUOW.

== Controversies ==
=== Sexual assault allegation ===
On September 28, 2018, a Seattle resident alleged via Twitter that Fain had raped her. Governor Jay Inslee responded to the claims, stating, "this is a very serious allegation that unquestionably deserves a full investigation by law enforcement officials." After the November general election, plans for an investigation were announced, despite Fain's defeat by opponent Mona Das. The investigation was suspended in December 2018.

=== Redistricting commission ===
In February 2021, Senate Republican leaders appointed Fain to the state's redistricting commission which drew criticism from groups representing women and sexual assault survivors due the sexual assault allegations against him in the past. The groups co-signed an open letter calling for Fain's resignation from the commission until a proper investigation to the allegations are conducted and called for the commission to adopt codes of conduct "to ensure a safe and respectful environment for the public, staff, and Commissioners." In April 2021, Fain responded that he wouldn't resign and remained on the commission.

== Personal life ==
Fain lives in Normandy Park, Washington, with his wife Steffanie and their two children.
