= Highline College =

Community college in Des Moines, Washington, US

- Former name: Highline Community College
- Type: Public community college
- Established: 1961
- Parent institution: Community College District IX
- Endowment: $43.7 million (2016–17)
- President: John Mosby
- Students: 15,375
- Location: Des Moines, Washington, U.S. 47°23′19″N 122°18′03″W
- Campus: Suburban, 80 acres (320,000 m^{2})
- Language: English
- Nickname: Thunderbirds
- Sporting affiliations: Northwest Athletic Conference
- Website: www.highline.edu

Highline College is a public community college in Des Moines, Washington. Highline was founded in 1961 as the first community college in King County, Washington. The main campus covers 80 acres (320,000 m^{2}). As of 2015, there were approximately 17,000 students and 350,000 alumni of the college.

== History ==
Highline College was founded in 1961 as the first community college in King County. The current campus in Des Moines was built in 1964 with additional buildings added in following years to meet student and technology needs. The school was known as Highline College until 1967 when the Washington State Legislature passed the Community College Act of 1967, and the name became Highline Community College. In June 2014, Highline's board of trustees voted to change the name back to Highline College. Starting in the fall of 2014, Highline was approved to offer four Bachelor of Applied Science degree programs. Classes are also offered at the Marine Science and Technology (MaST) Center at Redondo Beach and additional service-area locations such as Burien and White Center.

== Demographics ==
The demographics of Highline are diverse due to both the local population and the acceptance of international students. As of 2019, 23% of all students were categorized as White, 20% are Asian, 1% are Pacific Islander, 20% African American, 12% Hispanic/Latino, less than 1% Native American, and 12% are multiracial. The total number credit and non-credit students was 15,375, while 71% of those are credit students. The student body was 60% female and 40% male.

== Accreditation ==
The college is accredited by the Northwest Commission on Colleges and Universities. Its Nursing program is accredited by National League for Nursing Accreditation Commission. The Respiratory Care program is accredited by the Committee on Accreditation for Respiratory Care and the Commission on Accreditation of Allied Health Education Programs. The Medical Assistant program is accredited by the Commission on Accreditation of Allied Health Education Programs and the Curriculum Review Board of the American Association of Medical Assistants Endowment. The Paralegal program is approved by the American Bar Association.

== Foundation ==
The Highline College Foundation was established in 1972 as a non-profit organization to help raise funds to improve the quality of education at Highline College. The Foundation often holds events and allows donations to be made in an effort to raise funds. With a donation of $500 the Foundation allows individuals or groups to create their own fund that others may donate to. Both students and faculty members can take advantage of the Foundation, through scholarships and grants respectively.

== MaST ==
The Marine Science and Technology Center (MaST) is located approximately ten minutes south of the Highline College campus at Redondo Beach Park, and promotes the understanding of the South Puget Sound ecosystem. A new facility, 2,500 square feet (230 m^{2}) large and situated on a 260-foot (79 m) pier, opened in 2008.

== Athletics ==
Highline College competes in the Northwest Athletic Conference (NWAC) as the Thunderbirds, fielding men's and women's teams for basketball, soccer, and golf, and women's teams for softball, tennis and volleyball.

== CWU-Des Moines ==
Central Washington University has a campus facility located on Highline College's campus. There is a partnership between the schools that allows students to take classes from both Highline and CWU concurrently. Both bachelor's and master's degrees programs are available along with certification programs.

== Notable alumni ==
- Brandon Brown – professional basketball player
- Anthony Hamilton – NJCAA All-American wrestler; professional mixed martial artist
- Ann Rule – true crime writer
- Norm Rice – first elected African-American mayor of Seattle
- Alexis Denisof – actor
- Jens Pulver – professional mixed martial artist
- Trevor Smith – NJCAA All-American (2002); professional mixed martial artist
- Brian Scalabrine – former professional basketball player and television analyst for NBC Sports Boston
