= Mona Das =

American businesswoman and politician from Washington

Member of the Washington Senate from the 47th district
- In office January 14, 2019 – January 9, 2023
- Preceded by: Joe Fain
- Succeeded by: Claudia Kauffman

Personal details
- Born: 1971 (age 54–55) Munger, India
- Party: Democratic
- Education: University of Cincinnati (BA); Pinchot University (MBA)

Mona Das (born 1971) is an American former politician who served a single term in the Washington State Senate from the 47th district. Elected in 2018, she assumed office on January 14, 2019.

== Early life and education ==
Mona Das was born in Munger, Bihar, India. Her family immigrated to the United States when she was eight months old. She graduated from the University of Cincinnati with a Bachelor of Arts in psychology. She received a Master of Business Administration in sustainable business from Pinchot University in 2012.

== Career ==
Das founded and operated her own mortgage loan business, MOXY Money. She co-founded Opportunity PAC alongside Shasti Conrad, a political action committee focused on electing Black women to office, which raised about $300,00 and was credited with tripling Black women's representation in the Washington State Legislature in 2020.

=== Washington Senate ===
In 2018, Das ran for the Washington State Senate in the 47th district as a Democrat against incumbent Republican Senator Joe Fain, after dropping out of the concurrent race for Washington's 8th congressional district. She narrowly won the election, with 28,394 votes to Fain's 27,413. She retired in 2022.

=== 2024 Public Lands Commissioner campaign ===
In 2023, Das announced her campaign for Washington State Commissioner of Public Lands in the 2024 election with the support of state senator Claudia Kauffman and former Washington State Democratic Party chair Tina Podlodowski. She suspended her campaign before the primary election.
