= Stephen L. Johnson (politician, born 1939) =

American politician

Stephen Johnson

Member of the Washington Senate from the 47th district
- In office January 9, 1995 – January 8, 2007
- Preceded by: Sylvia Skratek
- Succeeded by: Claudia Kauffman

Personal details
- Born: November 13, 1939 (age 86)
- Party: Republican
- Spouse: Lynn Johnson
- Children: 3
- Education: Whitman College (BA); University of Washington (JD)
- Profession: Lawyer

Stephen L. Johnson (born November 13, 1939) is an American lawyer and politician who served in the Washington State Senate, representing the 47th district from 1995 to 2007. A member of the Republican Party, he ran for the Washington Supreme Court in 2006, losing to incumbent Susan Owens.
