= Sylvia Skratek =

American politician

Member of the Washington Senate from the 47th district
- In office January 14, 1991 – January 9, 1995
- Preceded by: Michael Patrick
- Succeeded by: Stephen L. Johnson

Personal details
- Born: December 23, 1950 (age 75)
- Party: Democratic

Sylvia Skratek (born December 23, 1950) is an American politician who served in the Washington State Senate, representing the 47th district from 1991 to 1995.
