= Claudia Kauffman =

American politician (born 1959)

Member of the Washington State Senate from the 47th district
- Incumbent
- Assumed office January 9, 2023
- Preceded by: Mona Das
- In office January 8, 2007 – January 10, 2011
- Preceded by: Stephen L. Johnson
- Succeeded by: Joe Fain

Personal details
- Born: July 15, 1959 (age 67) Idaho, U.S.
- Party: Democratic
- Spouse: Larry Cordier
- Children: 3
- Profession: Small business owner

Claudia G. Kauffman (born July 15, 1959) is an American politician who is a member of the Washington State Senate representing the 47th district. A member of the Democratic Party, she is the first Native American (Nez Perce) woman elected to the upper chamber.

She previously served the district for one term, from 2007 to 2011. She lost her re-election in 2010 before making a successful return to the senate in 2022.

== Biography ==
Kauffman was born in Idaho in 1959 to John and Josephine Kauffman. She attended Cleveland High School and later studied at the University of Idaho and the Oglala Lakota College.

In 2017, she lost a race for Seattle Port Commissioner Position 1.

In 2022, she defeated Republican Bill Boyce to reclaim her old senate seat following the retirement of fellow Democratic senator Mona Das.

== See also ==
- List of Native American politicians
- Native American women in politics
