= Des Moines, Washington =

Des Moines, Washington baqʷab
- City
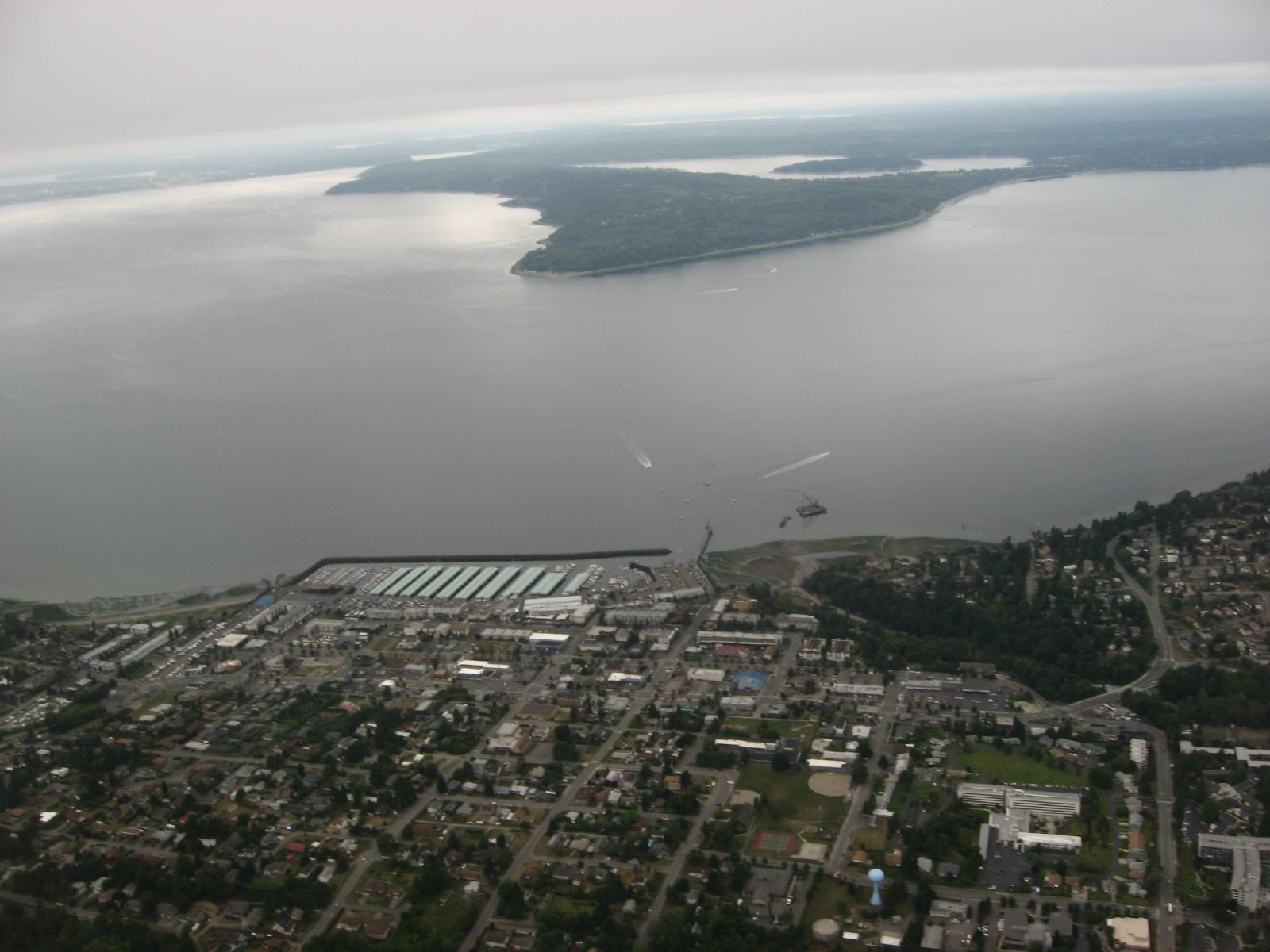
- Aerial view

- Seal
- Nickname: "The Waterland City"
- Location of Des Moines, Washington
- Coordinates: 47°22′28″N 122°19′07″W
- Country: United States
- State: Washington
- County: King
- Founded: 1867
- Incorporated: June 17, 1959

Government
  - Type: Council–manager
  - Mayor: Yoshiko Grace Matsui

Area
  - Total: 7.408 sq mi (19.187 km^{2})
  - Land: 6.414 sq mi (16.611 km^{2})
  - Water: 0.994 sq mi (2.575 km^{2})
- Elevation: 190 ft (58 m)

Population (2020)
  - Total: 32,888
  - Estimate (2024): 33,207
  - Density: 4,988.3/sq mi (1,926.01/km^{2})
- Time zone: UTC−8 (Pacific (PST))
  - Summer (DST): UTC−7 (PDT)
- ZIP Codes: 98148, 98198
- Area code(s): 206, 564
- FIPS code: 53-17635
- GNIS feature ID: 2410327
- Website: desmoineswa.gov

Des Moines (/dəˈmɔɪnz/ də-MOYNZ) (Lushootseed: baqʷab) is a city in King County, Washington, United States. The population was 32,888 as of the 2020 census. The city is located on the east shore of Puget Sound, near the center of the Seattle metropolitan area. It is bordered by the suburbs of Federal Way to the south, Kent to the east, SeaTac to the northeast, Burien to the north, and Normandy Park to the northwest.

Des Moines is one of the few points along this shoreline where the topography facilitates access to the water, and a recreational marina operated by the city, with moorage, boat launching and pier fishing facilities, is located there. Saltwater State Park, located on a steep ravine between the Zenith and Woodmont neighborhoods, is the most used state park on Puget Sound. Near the border of Federal Way, the Redondo neighborhood has a boardwalk and aquarium.

== History ==
What was to become Des Moines was first explored by Europeans on May 26, 1792, during the exploration of British naval Captain George Vancouver on his flagship HMS Discovery. The first Americans to visit the area were part of Charles Wilkes' Expedition.

The first known settler was John Moore, who probably arrived circa 1867. His homestead claim certificate (#285) was granted on July 2, 1872.

In 1887, F.A. Blasher persuaded some friends in his home city of Des Moines, Iowa, to help finance the development of a town on Puget Sound. The work was done by the Des Moines Improvement Company. In 1889 the area was platted into lots and sold by the Des Moines Improvement Company, which had been incorporated by F. A. Blasher, Orin Watts Barlow, Charles M. Johnson, and John W. Kleeb. Lumber mills provided the community with its primary employment.

Early transportation to Des Moines was by water. The mosquito fleet provided access to Seattle, Tacoma, and Vashon. The first road, the Brick Highway, was completed in May 1916. The first cross-Puget Sound automobile ferry started service from Des Moines to Portage on November 13, 1916. This ferry service continued until September 1921. Before World War II farming fueled the local economy.

Following the war, suburbanization of the community took place. With increased population, the county government was unable to supply the level of service and local control desired by Des Moines residents. In response to these needs, Des Moines was officially incorporated on June 17, 1959.

On December 12, 1969, an F3 tornado injured one person near Saltwater State Park. The city's most visible asset is its 838-berth small boat marina, that was opened on May 10, 1970. In 1980, a 670-foot (200 m) concrete and aluminum fishing pier was built at the northern end of the marina.

Property within the city has been the subject of land buyouts because of noise from aircraft landing or taking off from the Seattle–Tacoma International Airport, which is located 2 miles (3.2 km) north of Des Moines.

On November 22, 1982, Des Moines annexed the nearby community of Zenith, an unincorporated farming town that had been founded in 1906 and that later became a location for the homes of Boeing workers.

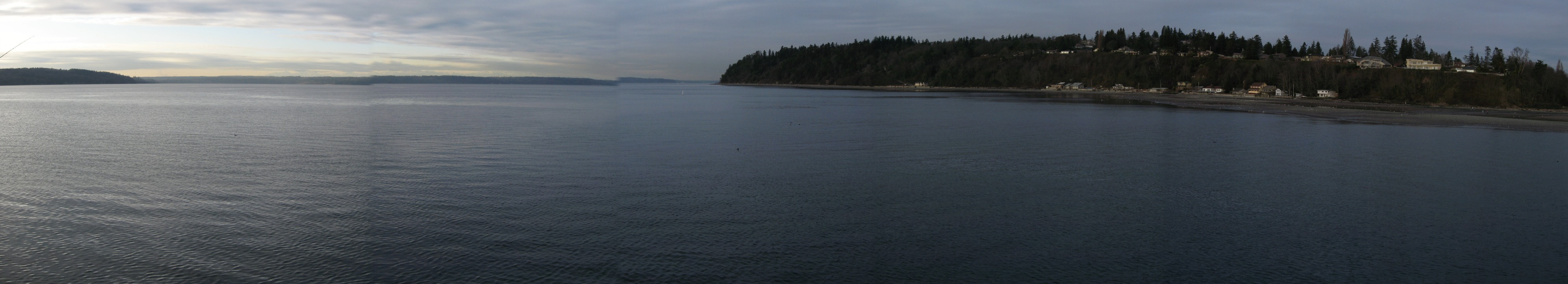
A view of Puget Sound and the Normandy Park cove from the fishing pier

== Geography ==
According to the United States Census Bureau, the city has a total area of 7.408 square miles (19.19 km^{2}), of which 6.414 square miles (16.61 km^{2}) is land and 0.994 square miles (2.57 km^{2}) is water.

Most of the city rolls gently down to the waters of Puget Sound from an elevation of approximately 400 feet (120 m) along the eastern city boundary on Pacific Highway, allowing many homes to enjoy an unobstructed view of the sound and Vashon. The ravines of Des Moines Creek and Massey Creek deeply incise this broad slope.

== Demographics ==
Historical population
Census	Pop.	Note	%±
1890	212		—
1960	1,987		—
1970	3,951		98.8%
1980	7,378		86.7%
1990	17,283		134.3%
2000	29,267		69.3%
2010	29,673		1.4%
2020	32,888		10.8%
2024 (est.)	33,207		1.0%
U.S. Decennial Census; 2020 Census

=== Racial and ethnic composition ===
Des Moines, Washington – racial and ethnic composition Note: the US Census treats Hispanic/Latino as an ethnic category. This table excludes Latinos from the racial categories and assigns them to a separate category. Hispanics/Latinos may be of any race.
Race / ethnicity (NH = non-Hispanic)	Pop. 2000	Pop. 2010	Pop. 2020	% 2000	% 2010	% 2020
White alone (NH)	20,986	17,212	15,506	71.71%	58.01%	47.15%
Black or African American alone (NH)	2,069	2,605	3,940	7.07%	8.78%	11.98%
Native American or Alaska Native alone (NH)	254	257	204	0.87%	0.87%	0.62%
Asian alone (NH)	2,399	3,106	4,139	8.20%	10.47%	12.59%
Pacific Islander alone (NH)	380	699	848	1.30%	2.36%	2.58%
Other race alone (NH)	43	52	149	0.15%	0.18%	0.45%
Mixed race or multiracial (NH)	1,200	1,242	2,280	4.10%	4.19%	6.93%
Hispanic or Latino (any race)	1,936	4,500	5,822	6.61%	15.17%	17.70%
Total	29,267	29,673	32,888	100.00%	100.00%	100.00%

=== 2020 census ===
As of the 2020 census, there were 32,888 people, 12,423 households, and 7,854 families residing in the city.

The population density was 5,129.1 inhabitants per square mile (1,980.4/km^{2}). There were 13,222 housing units at an average density of 2,062.1 per square mile (796.2/km^{2}). The median age was 39.6 years, with 20.9% of residents under the age of 18 and 16.9% aged 65 or older. For every 100 females there were 98.2 males, and for every 100 females age 18 and over there were 96.3 males age 18 and over.

Of the 12,423 households, 29.7% had children under the age of 18 living in them, 43.4% were married couples living together, 20.5% had a male householder with no spouse or partner present, 28.4% had a female householder with no spouse or partner present, 28.1% of all households were made up of individuals, and 12.4% had someone living alone who was 65 years of age or older.

Of those 13,222 housing units, 6.0% were vacant, the homeowner vacancy rate was 1.3%, and the rental vacancy rate was 6.7%.

99.9% of residents lived in urban areas, while 0.1% lived in rural areas.

=== American Community Survey ===
As of the 2022 American Community Survey, there are 12,369 estimated households in Des Moines with an average of 2.57 persons per household. The city has a median household income of $81,362, and approximately 11.8% of the city's population lives at or below the poverty line.

Des Moines has an estimated 63.3% employment rate, with 30.4% of the population holding a bachelor's degree or higher and 88.6% holding a high school diploma.

=== 2010 census ===
As of the 2010 census, there were 29,673 people, 11,664 households, and 7,249 families residing in the city. The population density was 4,564.4 inhabitants per square mile (1,762.3/km^{2}). There were 12,588 housing units at an average density of 1,936.6 per square mile (747.7/km^{2}). The racial makeup of the city was 63.55% White, 9.08% African American, 1.07% Native American, 10.66% Asian, 2.41% Pacific Islander, 7.78% from some other races and 5.45% from two or more races. Hispanic or Latino people of any race were 15.17% of the population.

There were 11,664 households, of which 30.5% had children under the age of 18 living with them, 43.8% were married couples living together, 12.8% had a female householder with no husband present, 5.5% had a male householder with no wife present, and 37.9% were non-families. 30.1% of all households were made up of individuals, and 10.6% had someone living alone who was 65 years of age or older. The average household size was 2.49 and the average family size was 3.10.

The median age in the city was 39.4 years. 22.2% of residents were under the age of 18; 8.6% were between the ages of 18 and 24; 26.9% were from 25 to 44; 27.4% were from 45 to 64; and 14.8% were 65 years of age or older. The gender makeup of the city was 48.7% male and 51.3% female.

=== 2000 census ===
As of the 2000 census, there were 29,267 people, 11,337 households, and 7,289 families residing in the city. The population density was 4,616.5 inhabitants per square mile (1,782.4/km^{2}). There were 11,777 housing units at an average density of 1,857.7 per square mile (717.3/km^{2}). The racial makeup of the city was 74.15% White, 7.20% African American, 0.96% Native American, 8.28% Asian, 1.34% Pacific Islander, 3.32% from some other races and 4.76% from two or more races. Hispanic or Latino people of any race were 6.61% of the population.

There were 11,337 households, out of which 30.4% had children under the age of 18 living with them, 47.1% were married couples living together, 12.2% had a female householder with no husband present, and 35.7% were non-families. 27.8% of all households were made up of individuals, and 6.9% had someone living alone who was 65 years of age or older. The average household size was 2.47 and the average family size was 3.02.

In the city the population was spread out, with 23.8% under the age of 18, 8.3% from 18 to 24, 31.1% from 25 to 44, 22.0% from 45 to 64, and 14.9% who were 65 years of age or older. The median age was 37 years. For every 100 females, there were 93.0 males. For every 100 females age 18 and over, there were 89.4 males.

The median income for a household in the city was $48,971, and the median income for a family was $57,003. Males had a median income of $40,007 versus $30,553 for females. The per capita income for the city was $24,127. About 5.6% of families and 7.6% of the population were below the poverty line, including 9.6% of those under age 18 and 2.8% of those age 65 or over.

== Education ==
=== Primary and secondary schools ===
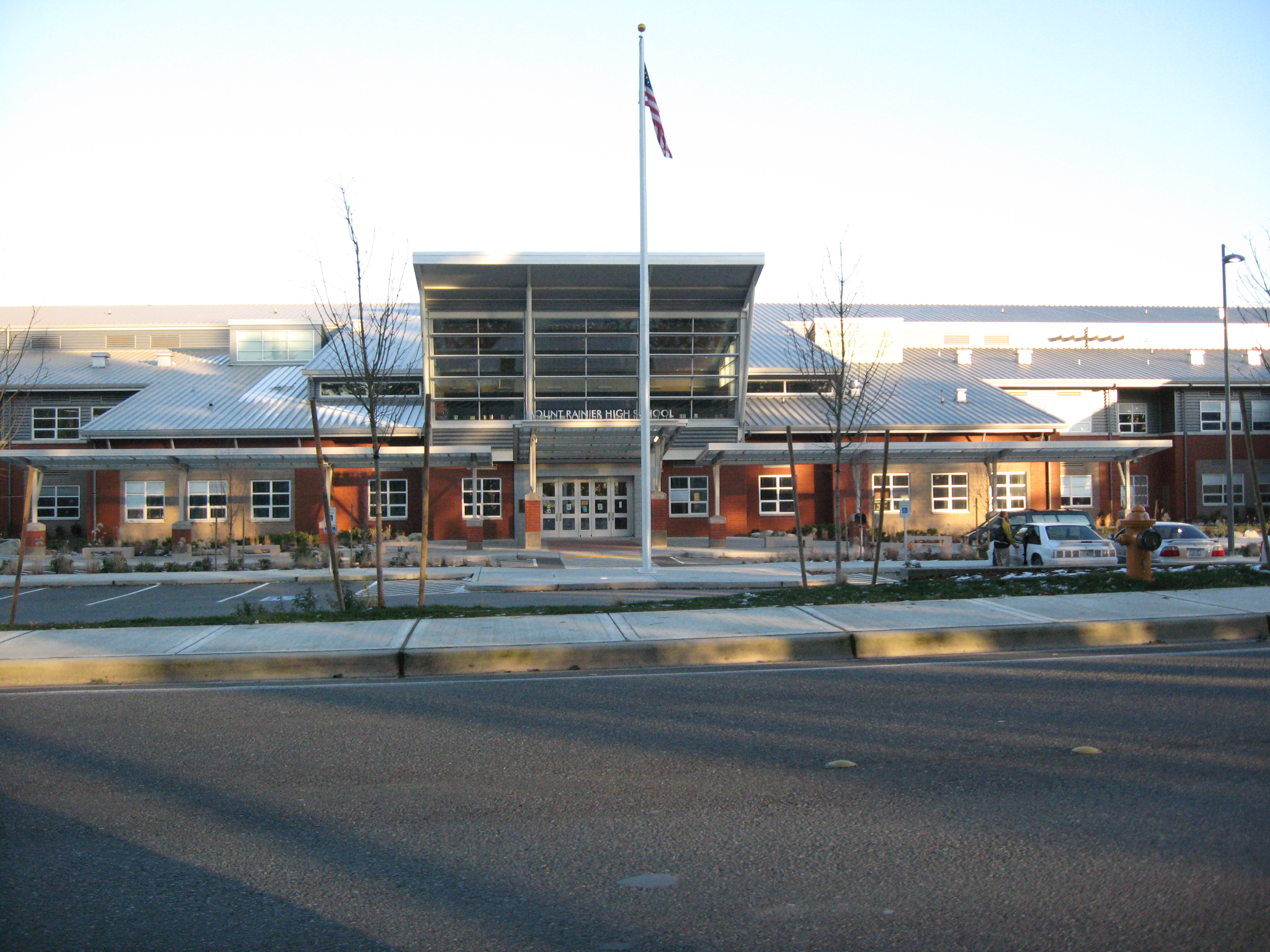
Mount Rainier High School

Most of Des Moines is within the Highline Public Schools district; the neighborhoods of Woodmont and Redondo are within the Federal Way School District.

Elementary schools within Des Moines include Des Moines Elementary School, Midway Elementary School, North Hill Elementary School, Olympic Hill Elementary School, Parkside Elementary School, and Woodmont Elementary School (Woodmont is a part of the Federal Way School District).

Pacific Middle School and Mount Rainier High School are the secondary schools of Des Moines.

Des Moines students, pre-K through 8th grade, are also served by St. Philomena Catholic School and Holy Trinity Lutheran School.

=== Colleges ===
Highline College is in Des Moines.

CWU-Des Moines, a branch of Central Washington University, is co-located on the Highline College campus and offers several bachelor and graduate degrees.

== Parks and recreation ==
Saltwater State Park is in Des Moines.

== Government ==
Des Moines has as a council–manager form of government.

The Des Moines Police Department is the primary law enforcement agency for the city of Des Moines, Washington. It employs 30 sworn officers. The police chief will be Ted Boe, the former Chief of Burien.

== Transportation ==
Des Moines is served by several regional highways: Interstate 5 to the east, which connects to Seattle and Tacoma; State Route 99, which runs along the east side; State Route 509 through downtown; and State Route 516 to Kent.

King County Metro provides bus service from Des Moines to surrounding areas, including Burien Transit Center and Kent station. A park-and-ride lot at the Kent-Des Moines Road interchange has express buses to Seattle and Tacoma operated by Metro and Sound Transit Express. Kent Des Moines station on the Link light rail system was opened by Sound Transit in December 2025; it is located near Highline College and is served by the 1 Line. A shuttle bus formerly connected downtown Des Moines to the previous terminus of the line at Angle Lake station.

The city government launched a passenger ferry service in August 2022 to connect Bell Harbor Marina in Downtown Seattle to Des Moines Marina. The two-month pilot was operated by Puget Sound Express using MV Chilkat Express, a 60-passenger catamaran.

== City landmarks ==
The City of Des Moines has designated the following landmark:

Landmark	Built	Listed	Address	Photo
Des Moines Beach Park (the former Covenant Beach Bible Camp)	1917–1931	2005	Cliff Ave. and 220th St. 47°24′26″N 122°19′43″W	
WPA Park Buildings; Des Moines Activity Center	1939–1940	1984	220th St. and 11th Ave S. 47°24′18″N 122°19′25″W	

== Notable people ==
- Gregory Carroll, operatic tenor
- Peter H. Gregory, information security advisor and writer.
- Darwin Jones, professional soccer player
- Mary Kay Letourneau, convicted sex offender; lived here
- Helen Palmatary, anthropologist; lived here
