= Peter H. Gregory =

American information security advisor

Peter Hart Gregory, CISA, CISSP is an American information security advisor, computer security specialist, and writer. He is the author of several books on computer security and information technology.

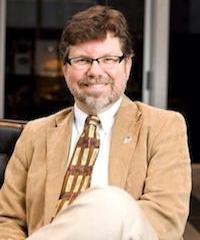
Peter Hart Gregory

== Biography ==
Peter Hart Gregory is a member of the Board of Advisors and lecturer for the NSA-certified University of Washington Certificate in Information Security and Risk Management, a member of the Board of Advisors for the University of Washington Certificate in Cloud Transition Strategies and Management, and on the Board of Advisors and the lead instructor (emeritus) for the University of Washington Certificate in Information Systems Security. He is a founding member of the Pacific CISO Forum.

As an InfraGard member, Gregory served as an expert witness in the 2006 cybercrime case, United States vs. Christopher Maxwell.

== Publications ==
- Gregory, Peter. Solaris Security, Prentice-Hall, 1999. ISBN 0-13-096053-5
- Gregory, Peter. Solaris Security (Japanese Language Edition), Prentice-Hall, 1999. ISBN 4-88135-974-6
- Gregory, Peter. Solaris Security (Chinese Language Edition), Prentice-Hall, 1999. ISBN 7-115-08728-8
- Gregory, Peter. Sun Certified System Administrator for Solaris 8 Study Guide, Prentice-Hall, 2001. ISBN 0-13-040933-2
- Gregory, Peter. Enterprise Information Security, Financial Times Management, 2003. ISBN 0-273-66157-4
- Gregory, Peter. Enterprise Information Security (Romanian Language Edition), Financial Times Management, 2003. ISBN 973-722-043-9
- Gregory, Peter; Miller, Lawrence. CISSP for Dummies, John Wiley & Sons, 2003. ISBN 0-7645-1670-1
- Gregory, Peter; Miller, Lawrence. Security+ Certification for Dummies, John Wiley & Sons, 2003. ISBN 0-7645-2576-X
- Gregory, Peter. Computer Viruses for Dummies, John Wiley & Sons, 2004. ISBN 0-7645-7418-3
- Gregory, Peter; Simon, Mike. Blocking Spam and Spyware for Dummies, John Wiley & Sons, 2005. ISBN 0-7645-7591-0
- Gregory, Peter. VoIP Security for Dummies, Avaya Limited Edition, John Wiley & Sons, 2006. ISBN 978-0-470-00987-1
- Gregory, Peter. SIP Communications for Dummies, Avaya Limited Edition, John Wiley & Sons, 2006. ISBN 0-470-04149-8
- Gregory, Peter. Converged Network Security for Dummies, Avaya Limited Edition, John Wiley & Sons, 2007. ISBN 978-0-470-12098-9
- Gregory, Peter. IP Multimedia Subsystems for Dummies, Radisys Limited Edition, John Wiley & Sons, 2007. ISBN 978-0-470-13587-7
- Gregory, Peter. Midsized Communications Solutions for Dummies, Avaya Limited Edition, John Wiley & Sons, 2007. ISBN 978-0-470-16552-2
- Gregory, Peter. Comunicaciones para Medianas Empresas para Dummies, Edicion Limitada de Avaya, John Wiley & Sons, 2007. ISBN 978-0-470-27666-2
- Gregory, Peter. Unified Communications for Dummies, Avaya Limited Edition, John Wiley & Sons, 2007. ISBN 0-470-17495-1
- Gregory, Peter. Comunicações Unificadas, Edicao Espeçial da Avaya, John Wiley & Sons, 2007. ISBN 978-0-470-27690-7
- Gregory, Peter. Securing the Vista Environment, O'Reilly Media, 2007. ISBN 0-596-51430-1
- Gregory, Peter; Miller, Lawrence. CISSP for Dummies, Second Edition, John Wiley & Sons, 2007. ISBN 0-470-12426-1
- Gregory, Peter. IT Disaster Recovery Planning for Dummies, John Wiley & Sons, 2007. ISBN 0-470-03973-6
- Gregory, Peter; Simon, Mike. Biometrics for Dummies, John Wiley & Sons, 2008. ISBN 0-470-29288-1
- Gregory, Peter; Miller, Lawrence. SIP Communications For Dummies, Avaya 2nd Custom Edition, John Wiley & Sons, 2009. ISBN 978-0-470-38114-4
- Gregory, Peter. CISSP Guide to Security Essentials, Thomson Course Technology, 2009. ISBN 1-4354-2819-6
- Gregory, Peter. CISA Certified Information Systems Auditor All-in-One Exam Guide, McGraw-Hill, 2009. ISBN 0-07-148755-7
- Gregory, Peter; Miller, Lawrence. CISSP For Dummies, Third Edition, John Wiley & Sons, 2009. ISBN 0-470-53791-4
- Gregory, Peter. CISA Certified Information Systems Auditor All-in-One Exam Guide, Second Edition, McGraw-Hill, 2011. ISBN 0-07-176910-2
- Gregory, Peter. Data Backup For Dummies, eVault Data Protection Edition, John Wiley & Sons, 2009. ISBN 978-0-470-58024-0
- Gregory, Peter. Firewalls For Dummies, Sonicwall Edition, John Wiley & Sons, 2011. ISBN 978-1-118-06194-7
- Gregory, Peter. Advanced Physical Access Control For Dummies, HID Global Edition, John Wiley & Sons, 2011. ISBN 978-1-118-12847-3
- Gregory, Peter; Miller, Lawrence. CISSP for Dummies, Fourth edition, John Wiley & Sons, 2012. ISBN 978-1118362396
- Gregory, Peter. CISSP Guide to Security Essentials, Second Edition, Cengage Learning, 2015. ISBN 978-1285060422
- Gregory, Peter. Advanced Persistent Threat Protection For Dummies, John Wiley & Sons, 2013. ISBN 978-1-118-76385-8
- Gregory, Peter. Stopping Zero Day Exploits For Dummies, John Wiley & Sons, 2013. ISBN 978-1-118-75850-2
- Gregory, Peter. Getting An Information Security Job For Dummies, John Wiley & Sons, 2015. ISBN 978-1-119-00281-9
- Gregory, Peter; Hughes, Bill. Getting A Networking Job For Dummies, John Wiley & Sons, 2015. ISBN 978-1-119-01594-9
- Gregory, Peter; DRaaS For Dummies, Veeam Software Special Edition, John Wiley & Sons, 2016. ISBN 978-1-119-28845-9
- Gregory, Peter; Miller, Lawrence. CISSP for Dummies, Fifth edition, John Wiley & Sons, 2016. ISBN 978-1-119-21023-8
- Gregory, Peter. CISA Certified Information Systems Auditor All-in-One Exam Guide, Third Edition, McGraw-Hill, 2016. ISBN 978-1-259-58416-9
- Gregory, Peter. CISM Certified Information Security Manager All-in-One Exam Guide, McGraw-Hill, 2018. ISBN 978-1-26-002703-7
- Gregory, Peter; Miller, Lawrence. CISSP For Dummies, Sixth edition, John Wiley & Sons, 2018. ISBN 978-1119505815
- Gregory, Peter. CISM Certified Information Security Manager Practice Exams, McGraw-Hill, 2019. ISBN 978-1-260-45611-0
- Gregory, Peter. CISA Certified Information Systems Auditor All-in-One Exam Guide, Fourth Edition, McGraw-Hill, 2019. ISBN 978-1-26-045880-0
- Gregory, Peter. CISA Certified Information Systems Auditor Practice Exams, McGraw-Hill, 2020. ISBN 978-1260459845
- Gregory, Peter. Chromebook For Dummies, Second edition, John Wiley & Sons, 2020. ISBN 978-1119651710
- Gregory, Peter. CDPSE Certified Data Privacy Solutions Engineer All-in-One Exam Guide, McGraw-Hill, 2021. ISBN 978-1260474824
- Gregory, Peter. CIPM Certified Information Privacy Manager All-in-One Exam Guide, McGraw-Hill, 2021. ISBN 978-1260474091
- Gregory, Peter; Miller, Lawrence. CISSP For Dummies, Seventh edition, John Wiley & Sons, 2022. ISBN 978-1119806820
- Gregory, Peter; Rogers, Bobby; Dunkerley, Dawn. CRISC Certified in Risk and Information Systems Control All-in-One Exam Guide, Second edition, McGraw-Hill, 2022. ISBN 978-1260473339
- Gregory, Peter. The Art of Writing Technical Books, Waterside Productions, 2022. ISBN 978-1957807492
- Gregory, Peter. CISM Certified Information Security Manager All-in-One Exam Guide, Second edition, McGraw-Hill, 2022. ISBN 978-1264268313
- Gregory, Peter. CISM Certified Information Security Manager Practice Exams, Second edition, McGraw-Hill, 2023. ISBN 978-1264693740
- Gregory, Peter. Chromebook For Dummies, Third edition, John Wiley & Sons, 2023. ISBN 978-1394168804
- Gregory, Peter; Miller, Lawrence. CISSP For Dummies, Eighth edition, John Wiley & Sons, 2024. ISBN 978-1394261772
- Gregory, Peter. Elementary Information Security, Fourth edition, Jones & Bartlett Learning, 2024. ISBN 978-1284305937
- Gregory, Peter; Chapple, Mike. CISA Study Guide, John Wiley & Sons, 2025. ISBN 978-1394288380
- Gregory, Peter; Chapple, Mike. CISA Practice Tests, John Wiley & Sons, 2025. ISBN 978-1394290109
- Gregory, Peter. Access Control and Identity Management, Fourth edition, Jones & Bartlett Learning, 2024. ISBN 978-1284315080
- Gregory, Peter. AIGP Artificial Intelligence Governance Professional Study Guide, John Wiley & Sons, 2026. ISBN 978-1394363940
- Gregory, Peter. CRISC Certified in Risk and Information Systems Control Study Guide, John Wiley & Sons, 2026. ISBN 978-1394373666
- Gregory, Peter. CDPSE Certified Data Privacy Solutions Engineer Study Guide, John Wiley & Sons, 2026. ISBN 978-1394363803

Gregory has written several articles for Computerworld and Software Magazine including:

- Protect Apps and Data with a Disaster Recovery Plan
- Identify Vulnerabilities with Application Scanning Tools
- Integrity begins within: Security pros lead by example
- Vulnerability Management Ushers an Era of Technical Risk Management
- Security in the software development life cycle
- Tipping sacred cows: Make bold decisions to protect your information
- Lessons learned from the blaster worm
- For an infosecurity career, get the technical basics first

Gregory has been interviewed by trade publications including Information Security Magazine, CIO Magazine, Computerworld, eWeek, SearchSecurity, and Forbes.

== See also ==
- Computer Security
- InfraGard
- Certified Information Systems Security Professional
- Certified Information System Auditor
