= Covenant Beach Bible Camp =

- U.S. National Register of Historic Places
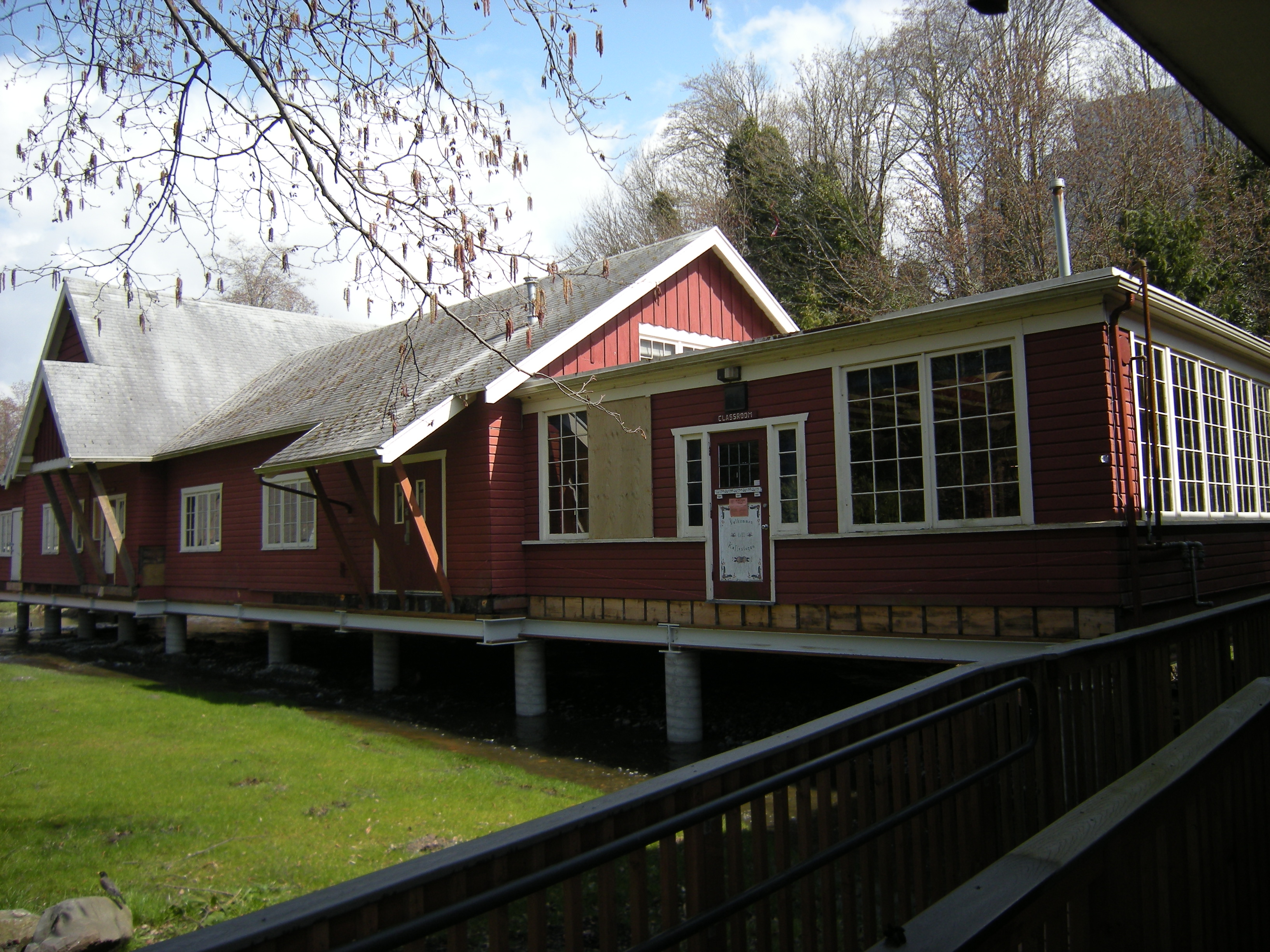
- Covenant Beach Bible Camp dining hall

- Location within Washington (state) Location within the United States
- Location: Cliff Ave. and 220th St., Des Moines, Washington
- Coordinates: 47.402691°N 122.329042°W
- Area: 18 acres (7.3 ha)
- Built: 1931
- Architect: Marvel Johnson; Harold J. Neslund
- Architectural style: Bungalow/craftsman
- NRHP reference No.: 05000313
- Added to NRHP: January 11, 2006

Covenant Beach Bible Camp, now known as Des Moines Beach Park, is a public site in Des Moines, Washington. Established in 1931, it was added to the National Register of Historic Places in 2006.

== Description ==
Covenant Beach Bible Camp is situated in an 18-acre (7.3 ha) valley at the mouth of Des Moines creek where the creek meets Puget Sound. The south end of the site consists of a saltwater beach front, rock seawall and tide flats.

The buildings contributing to the historic designation are:

- Sports cabin (1931) is a one-story 13 by 20 feet (4.0 m × 6.1 m) wood building that is a representative example of cabins built during the camp's early years.
- Roadside cabin (1931) is a one-story 17 by 15 feet (5.2 m × 4.6 m) wood building was built as family summer quarters.
- The dining hall (1934) is a two-story 44 by 110 feet (13 m × 34 m) wood building that spans Des Moines Creek.
- Sun Home Lodge (1934) is a two-story 24 by 50 feet (7.3 m × 15.2 m) wood building that was used as a girls' dormitory.
- Carlson House (1935) is a one-story 32 by 24 feet (9.8 m × 7.3 m) wood building that was built as a residence for the original site surveyor.
- The woodshop (1945) is a one-story 28 by 54 feet (8.5 m × 16.5 m) wood building with a concrete floor and a covered walkway that connects to the picnic shelter.

Additional buildings include the auditorium, Founders Lodge, caretaker's residence, and a picnic shelter built in 1920 which has a brick fireplace and served as the camp's first kitchen.

== History ==
Before Covenant Beach Bible Camp was established, the site was used as a campground for orphans from the Children's Industrial Home and Training School. Mr. and Mrs. Herman Draper, who ran the orphanage, purchased the campground around 1917. The private park was available for rent. A dance hall was built on the beach by two brothers, and it operated until 1931 when the Swedish Covenant Church purchased it to use as their tabernacle.

The bible camp was established in 1931 by the North Pacific Conference of the Evangelical Covenant Church. Initially, the North Pacific Conference leased the Draper Park site with an option to buy. Favorable response encouraged them to go forward with the purchase. Draper Park was officially renamed Covenant Beach in 1932.

Over the years, the church added cabins and buildings. The dining hall was designed in 1934 by Marvel Johnson Blomdahl, a twenty-year-old architecture student who would become one of the first female graduates of the University of Washington's School of Architecture. Lots were leased to members of the congregation on which to build their own cottages. Most cabins and cottages were built between 1933 and 1936. Some lots had platforms, and visiting families would pitch their tents on the platforms. In later years, the cottage or cabin that they had built on their leased lot served as a family's summer home.

The seasonal bible camp became a public park in 1988.

== Restoration ==
After the city took over the site, some cabins and cottages which had fallen into disrepair were demolished or moved. One rustic bridge was rebuilt in 1984 from old logs. The dining hall and picnic shelter were closed in 2002, due to damage from the Nisqually earthquake and flooding.

Restoration of the dining hall began in 2008. Because the dining hall was located in a flood plain, the building was given a new foundation 3 feet (0.91 m) above the flood plain. Some work required modifications to Des Moines Creek to mitigate flood risks and reduce impact on salmon. By 2010, additions enabled access in compliance with the Americans with Disabilities Act of 1990. The extensive interior and exterior renovations were completed in 2016.

The restoration of the Des Moines Beach Park auditorium won the John D. Spellman Preservation Award for Exemplary Achievement in Historic Preservation in 2013.
