= Saltwater State Park =

State park in Washington (state), United States

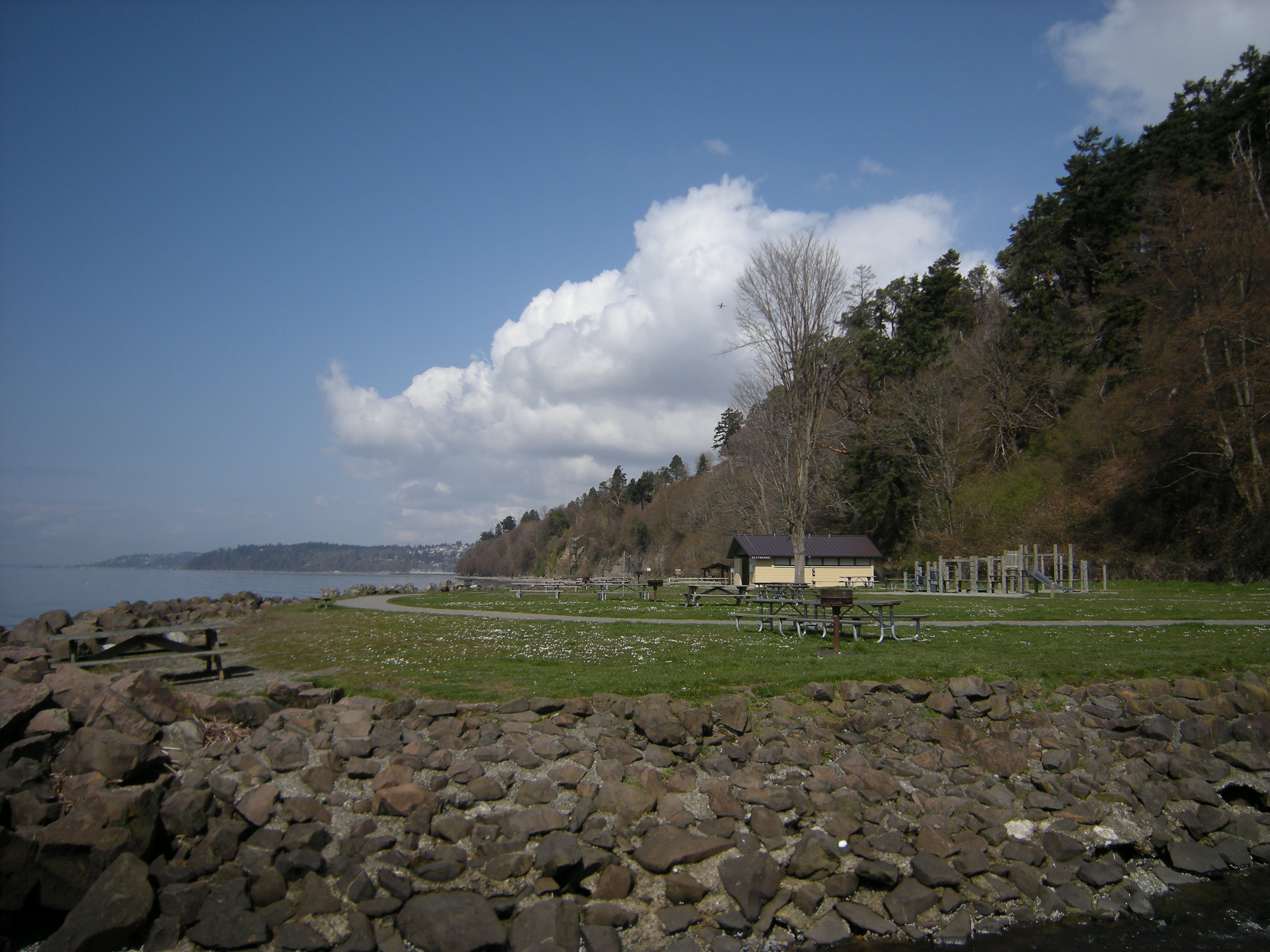

- Location within Washington (state) Location within the United States
- Location: King County, Washington, United States
- Coordinates: 47°22′22″N 122°19′29″W
- Area: 137 acres (55 ha)
- Elevation: 7 ft (2.1 m)
- Established: 1926
- Administrator: Washington State Parks and Recreation Commission
- Visitors: 412,923 (in 2024)
- Website: Official website

Saltwater State Park is a 137-acre (55 ha) plot of second-growth timber on Puget Sound in the city of Des Moines, Washington, United States. The main attraction is 1,445 feet (440 m) of saltwater beachfront, including a sandy swimming beach in the southwest corner, and rocky tideflats along the west with a submerged artificial reef that is popular with scuba divers.

Overlooked by most visitors is the steep ravine of McSorley (formerly Smith) Creek which winds inland in a gentle "S" curve joined by three tributary streams. About 30 campsites are situated on a road that parallels the creek, serving the public on a first-come-first-served basis. On both the north and south sides of the ravine there is a network of hiking trails which follow up the side creeks, rise through jungles of stinging nettles, skirt the edges of cliffs and ridges, and cross wooded plateaus.

As of 2009, Saltwater State Park has been designated a Marine Protected Area. Salmon spawn in McSorley Creek and the area provides habitat for many species of fish.

Marine View Drive passes over the park on a 200-foot (61 m)-high bridge, and 16th Avenue S crosses two branches of McSorley Creek to form the eastern boundary. One trail rises between the two branches of the creek to exit the park, while another trail continues from the dead-end of the campground service road a short way east of 16th Ave. along the main branch of the creek, informally extending the park.

The Redondo turn point for jets approaching SeaTac Airport is just to the south, so the park is rather noisy, but Saltwater remains one of the most-used State Parks in the Puget Sound region with an average of 350,000 visitors a year.

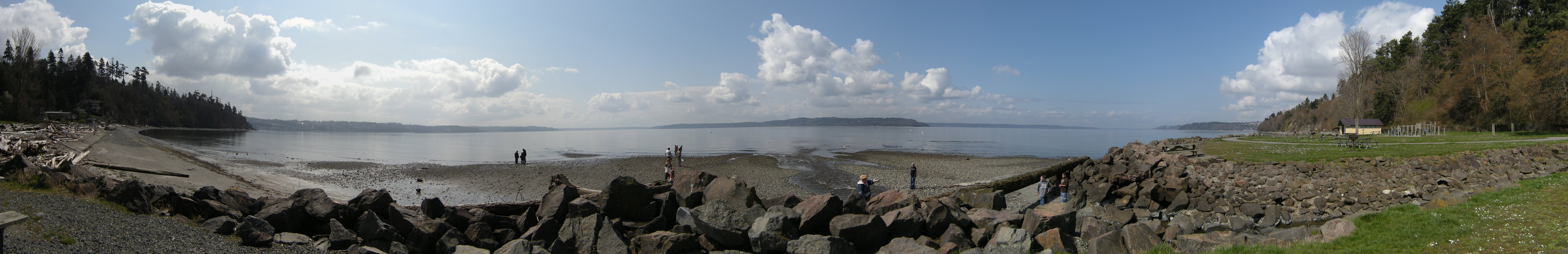
Looking out to Puget Sound from Saltwater State Park.

== Sources ==
- Hacking, Sue Muller (1997). Take A Walk. Seattle: Sasquatch Books.
- Mueller, Marge & Ted (1993). Washington State Parks: A Complete Recreation Guide. Seattle: The Mountaineers. ISBN 0-89886-893-9.
- "Saltwater State Park Marine Preserve". Washington Department of Fish and Wildlife.
