= Redondo, Des Moines, Washington =

Community in King County, Washington, United States

Coordinates: 47°20′53″N 122°19′19″W

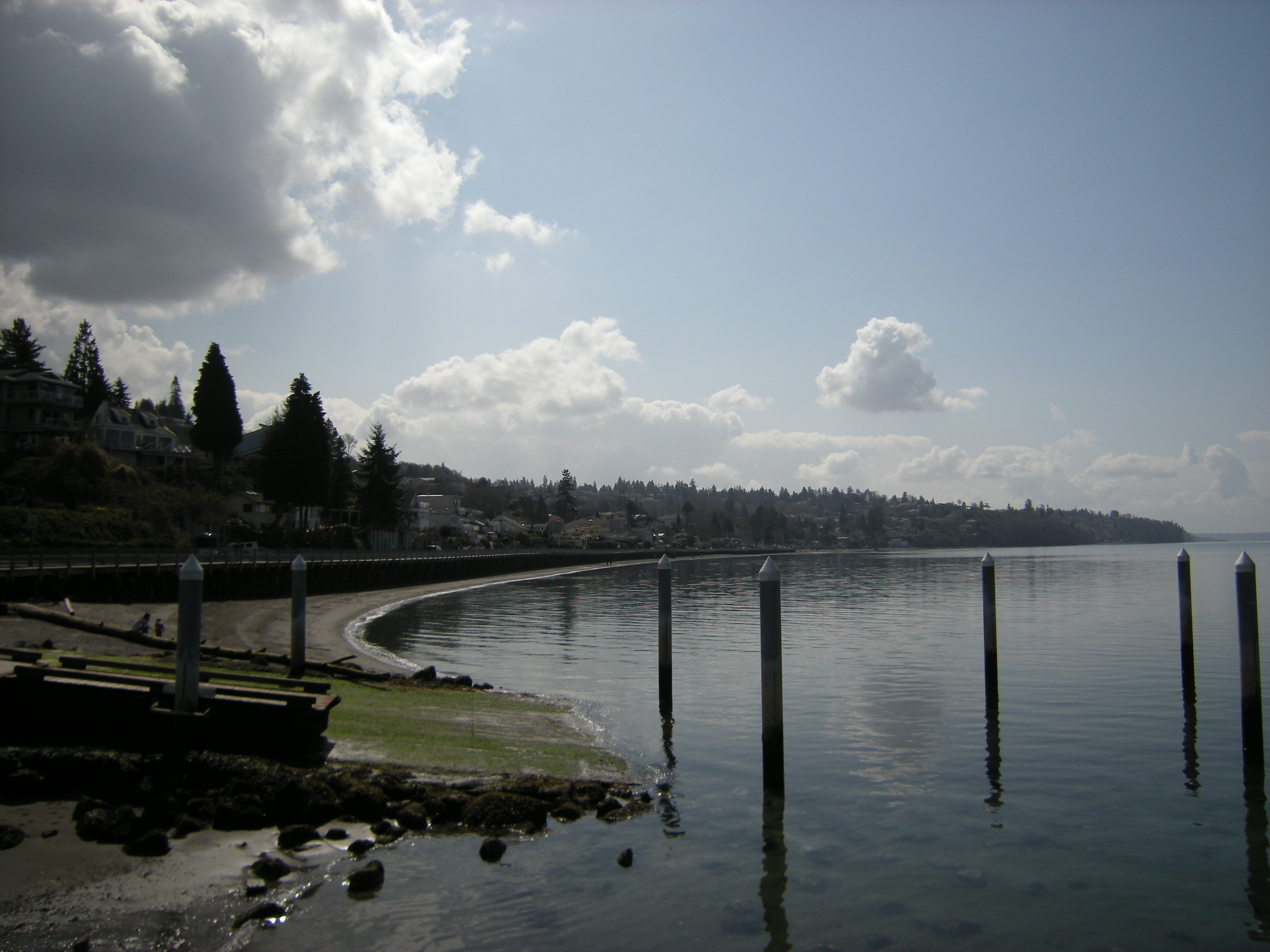
Redondo Beach

Redondo is a community within the incorporated boundaries of the city of Des Moines in King County, Washington. Redondo was initially founded as a resort, but gradually grew to be a middle-class residential community. The community, which is largely centered on Redondo Beach – a small beach with a board-walk, a Salty's restaurant, and a pay parking lot, was reportedly named by a settler from Redondo Beach, California. It is located near Saltwater State Park.

It is the default location for the post office box-only ZIP code 98054.

The ZIP code for Redondo is 98198.
