= Gloria Bornstein =

American artist and teacher (1937–2024)

- Born: 1937; New York City, U.S.
- Died: September 16, 2024 (aged 87); Seattle, Washington, U.S.

Gloria Bornstein (1937 – September 16, 2024) was an American artist and teacher known for her public art, primarily in the Pacific Northwest. She was the lead artist for Seattle's rebuild of the International Fountain in 1995.

== Early life and education ==
Bornstein, one of three sisters, was born in 1937 in the Bronx. Her parents, immigrants from Poland, operated a clothing store in the city. One of her sisters was Ida Applebroog, who also became an artist. Bornstein graduated from Hunter College with a bachelor's degree in art in 1959. She graduated from Antioch University with a master's degree in psychology in 1981.

== Career ==
Bornstein moved to Paris in 1962 with her husband, where she worked with Krishna Reddy at Atelier 17. Upon moving to Seattle in 1968, Bornstein integrated herself into the local art scene. She taught art at several schools in Seattle, including the Bush School, Cornish College of the Arts, and the University of Washington. In 1984, Bornstein exhibited a work called "Maids in a Row – Pretty as a Picture" in the window of a Seattle bookstore. The piece, which was inspired by the Green River killer, featured flower pots scattered atop an earth mound. In 1991, artwork by Bornstein was exhibited in the Security Pacific Gallery alongside work by Kay WalkingStick and Maxine Martell. When the city of Seattle rebuilt the International Fountain in 1995, Bornstein was selected as the lead artist. Her sculpture at the site, titled "Neototems," features cast-bronze whale forms rising out of the ground. The two forms depict a mother whale and a calf and they are positioned as though they are breaching the surface of the water. Bornstein was inspired by the oral tradition of the Coast Salish people, which states that whales used to swim under the ground between Seattle's Elliott Bay and Lake Union. The sculpture, originally placed on grass, was eventually surrounded by a concrete paved area decorated like water.

In 1996, Bornstein was one of several artists chosen by the Seattle Art Commission to create a temporary work of public art in downtown Seattle. Bornstein created a series of markers, collectively entitled "Shore View Points," along the city's Central Waterfront highlighting the "alternative history" of the region. Some markers highlighted conflicts between settlers and Indigenous tribes while others presented stories of Seattle's homeless. Along with the signs, Bornstein created a "Voice Library" for residents to leave messages with their reactions. An article in Environmental Values noted that the installation was unique in that it created a "flow of conversation" between the artwork and the viewer. In 1998, Bornstein installed a fountain featuring stepping stones inspired by early human language outside Eastern Washington University's Kennedy Library. In 2000, she created a set of animal sculptures for Celebration Park in Federal Way, Washington. The Seattle Art Museum hosted her exhibit "Still Life" in 2002, consisting of items reflecting on her family's relationship to The Holocaust.

She installed a series of archways depicting Puyallup's history at their Link station in 2006.

== Personal life and death ==
Bornstein's first husband was Paul Bornstein, a scientist, professor and Yale-trained doctor specializing in heart surgery who worked at Paris' Pasteur Institute and the University of Washington. They had three daughters. The two divorced in 1979. She married her second husband, Yasuo Mori, in 1981.

Gloria Bornstein died in Seattle on September 16, 2024, at the age of 87.
