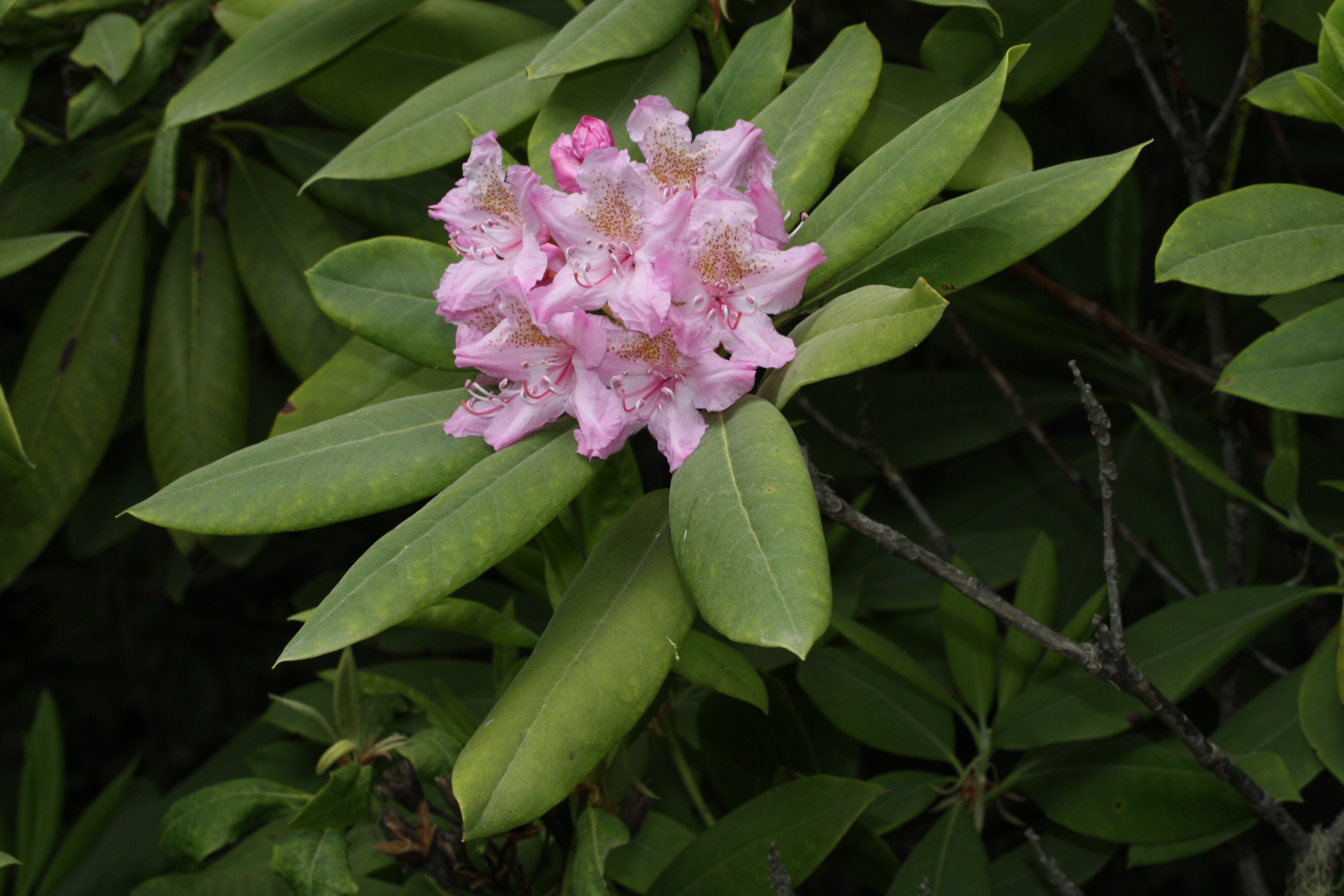
- In the Olympic Peninsula, Washington

Scientific classification
- Kingdom: Plantae
- Clade: Tracheophytes
- Clade: Angiosperms
- Clade: Eudicots
- Clade: Asterids
- Order: Ericales
- Family: Ericaceae
- Genus: Rhododendron
- Section: Rhododendron sect. Pontica
- Species: R. macrophyllum

Binomial name
- Rhododendron macrophyllum D.Don ex G.Don 1834
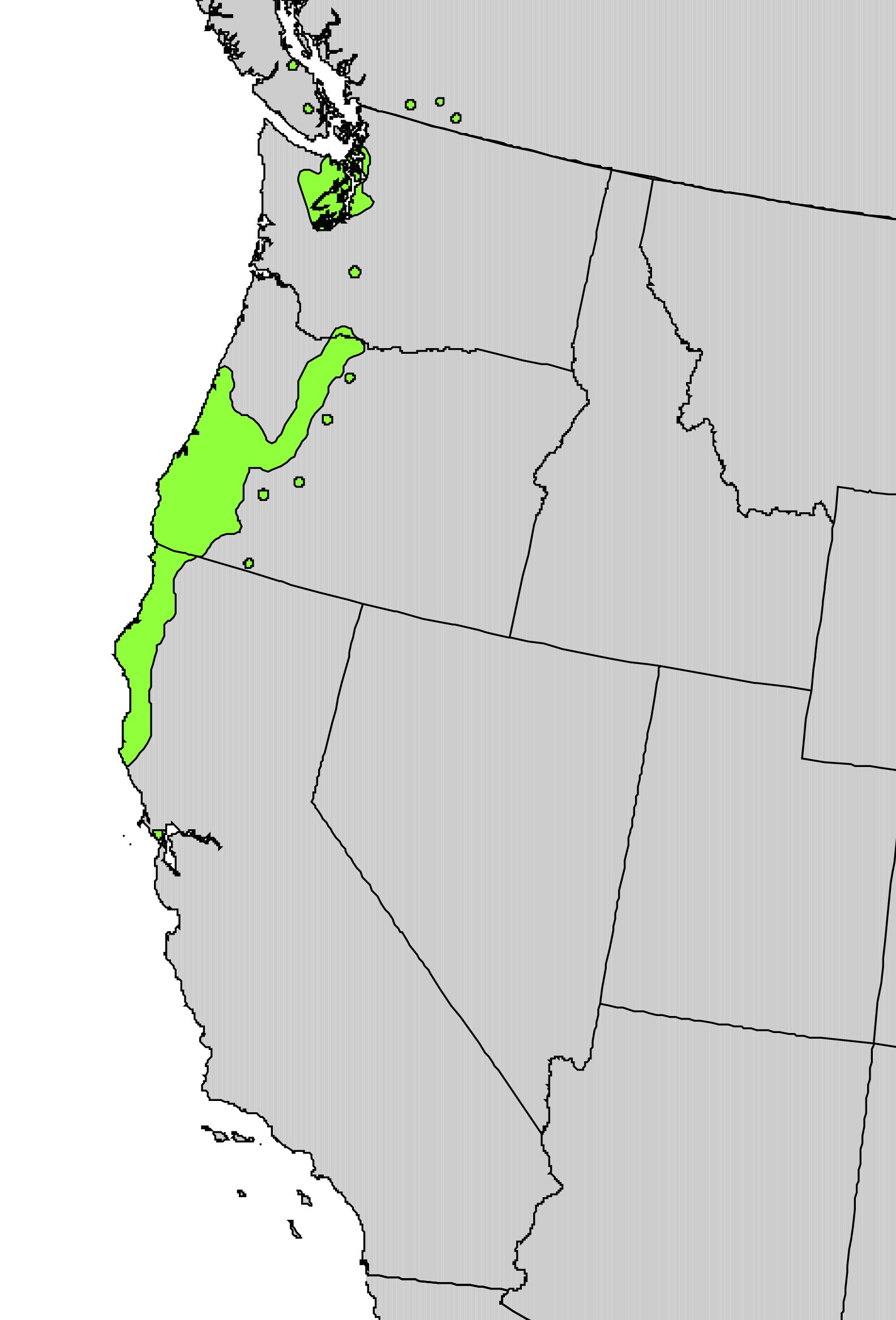
- Natural range

Synonyms
- Rhododendron californicum Hook.

= Rhododendron macrophyllum =

Pacific rhododendron

Species of plant

Rhododendron macrophyllum, also known as the Pacific rhododendron, California rose bay, California rhododendron, coast rhododendron or big leaf rhododendron, is a large-leaved species of Rhododendron native to the Pacific Coast of North America. It is the state flower of Washington.

== Description ==
It is an evergreen shrub growing up to 2–9 m (7–30 ft) tall. The leaves, retained for 2–3 years, are 7–23 cm (3–9 in) long and 3–7 cm (1–3 in) broad. The flowers are 2.8–4 cm (1.1–1.6 in) long, with five lobes on the corolla; color is usually pink, although variants exist.

== Distribution ==
The northern limit of its range is somewhat north of the border between Canada and the United States in British Columbia. It is found as far south as Monterey Bay in California. It is widely distributed in the Coast Mountains and Cascade Range. It is less abundant in the coastal mountains of Washington and northern Oregon and more common south of the Siuslaw River. It is mostly coastal in distribution but extends its range eastward to locations in the Cascade Mountains in Oregon, Washington and British Columbia.

== Habitat ==
Rhododendron macrophyllum, like many rhododendrons, thrives in disturbed habitats such as roadside embankments and recently deforested wildlands. In its native range, it can be found growing at sea level up to 1800 m (6000 ft.).

== History and cultivation ==
Archibald Menzies found R. macrophyllum growing along with Arbutus menziesii in May 1792 when he and George Vancouver made their second landfall after leaving Hawaii, near present-day Port Discovery, Washington. Seed was sent to England in 1850 by William Lobb.

In recent years it has been the main focus of a study group at the Rhododendron Species Foundation in Federal Way, Washington, the Western North American Rhododendron Species Project. The WNARSP is documenting the detailed range and forms of all of the western North American rhododendron species.

== Toxicity ==
The species contains andromedotoxin, which can poison the honey of nearby hives.

== Other sources ==
- Davidian, H. H. The Rhododendron Species, Volume III – Elepidotes continued. 1992. Timber Press. ISBN 978-0-88192-168-7.
- Cox, Peter A. & Kenneth N.E. The Encyclopedia of Rhododendron Species. 1997. Glendoick Publishing. ISBN 978-0-9530533-0-8.
