= Trout Lake (King County, Washington) =

Lake in King County, Washington

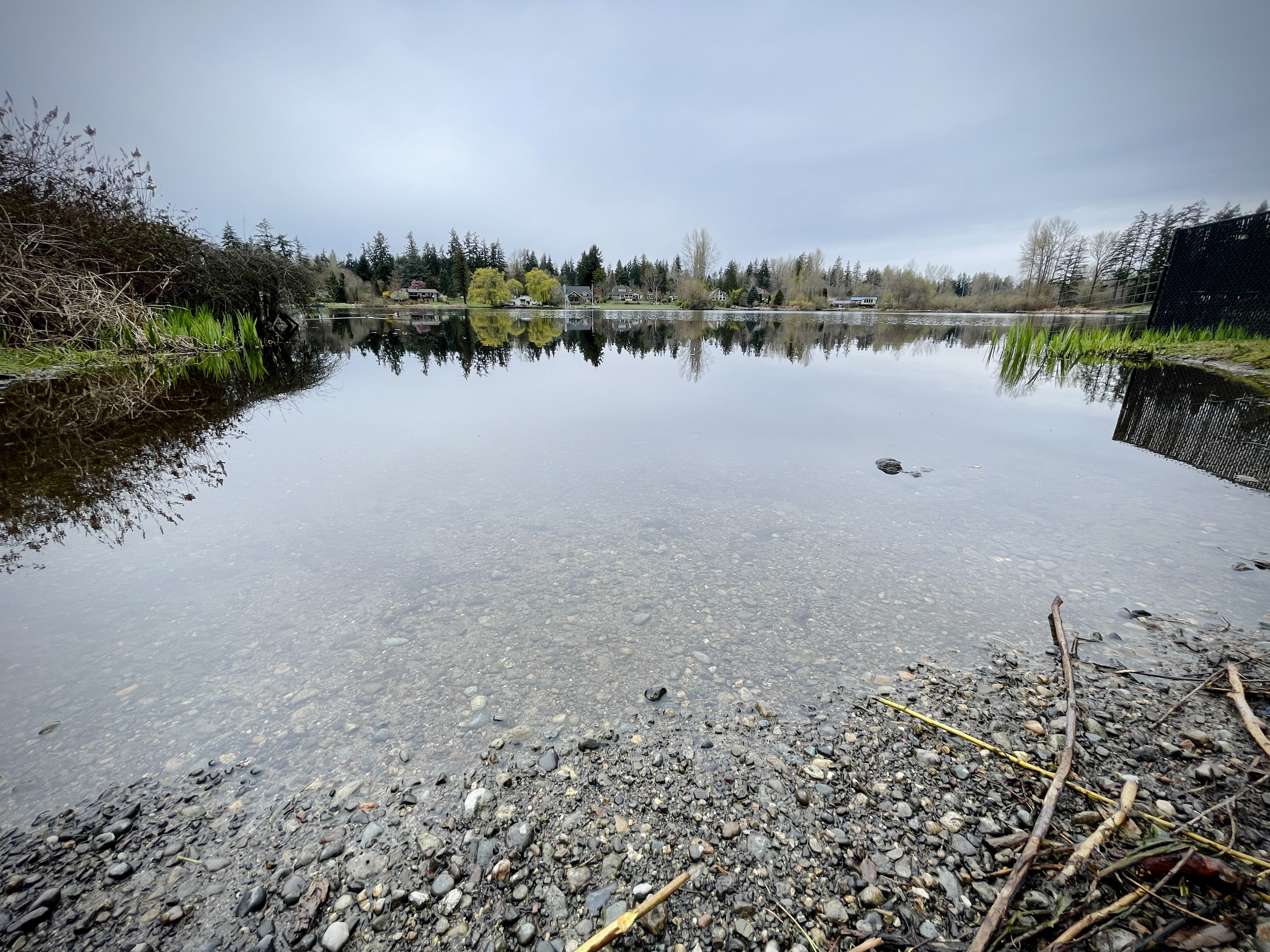
- View across Trout Lake from the public access point

- Location within Washington (state) Location within the United States
- Location: King County, Washington
- Coordinates: 47.266125°N 122.27959°W
- Basin countries: United States
- Surface area: 15.80 acres (6.39 ha)
- Max. depth: 27 ft (8.2 m)
- Surface elevation: 329 ft (100 m)

Trout Lake is a small lake in King County, Washington in the Lakeland South census designated place. Trout Lake is one of several lakes in Lakeland South, including Fivemile Lake, Lake Killarney and Lake Geneva.

== Description ==
Trout Lake is known for its fishing opportunities. It is named for rainbow trout, which are stocked annually by the Washington State Department of Fish and Wildlife. In addition to trout, black crappie, bluegill, and largemouth bass also inhabit the lake. Shoreline access is limited, since the lake is mostly surrounded by private property. However, there is a small boat ramp on the southern shore of the lake.

The lake has a 1,060-acre (430 ha) drainage basin that includes Fivemile Lake and the smaller Spider Lake. Water quality monitoring ended in 2008, but the most recent measurements indicate that it is borderline eutrophic.
