= Steel Lake (Washington) =

Lake in Federal Way, Washington

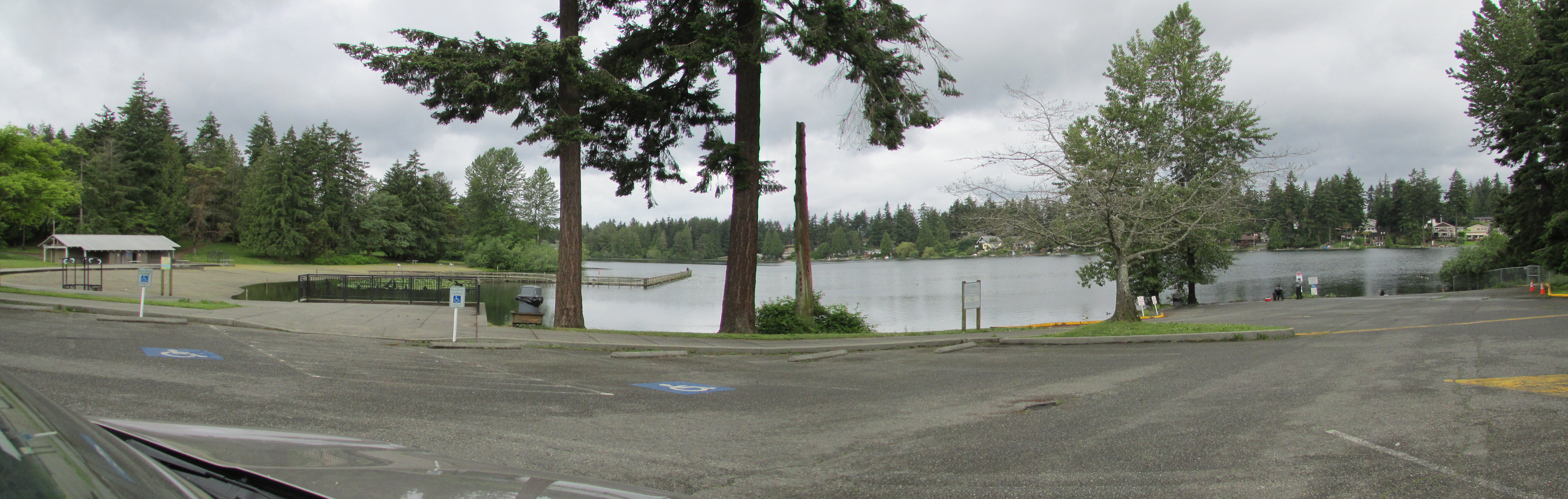
- Steel Lake Park

- Location within Washington (state) Location within the United States
- Location: Federal Way, Washington
- Coordinates: 47.327524°N 122.302893°W
- Basin countries: United States
- Surface area: 46.30 acres (18.74 ha)
- Max. depth: 24 ft (7.3 m)
- Surface elevation: 436 ft (133 m)

Steel Lake is a lake located in the city of Federal Way in southern King County, Washington, United States. Steel Lake Park is located on its southern shore. Interstate 5 is located just to the east of the lake, and Lake Dolloff is located on the other side of I-5.

== History ==
The first homesteaders moved to the Federal Way area in 1871. The lake was named for Arthur Steele, one of these early settlers.

In 2022, the city of Federal Way planned to develop the Steel Lake Annex, an 11-acre (4.5 ha) plot south of the main Steel Lake Park. The city proposed a new operations and maintenance facility on this site, which would house trucks, tractors, and other heavy equipment. The plan encountered great local opposition, as the annex is a popular public space that includes ballfields and a skate park; the city abandoned the proposal in 2023.

In May 2022, raw sewage leaked into the lake, which forced it to be closed temporarily from May 27 to June 6.

== Description ==
Steel Lake has many recreational opportunities. The 52-acre Steel Lake Park includes a beach and play area, and is especially popular in the summer. The lake also has many fishing opportunities. It is stocked with rainbow trout, and is also home to largemouth bass and yellow perch. It is one of only ten lakes in King County that has a seasonal fishing closure to protect fish populations.

The lake is mesotrophic.
