= Fivemile Lake =

Lake in King County, Washington

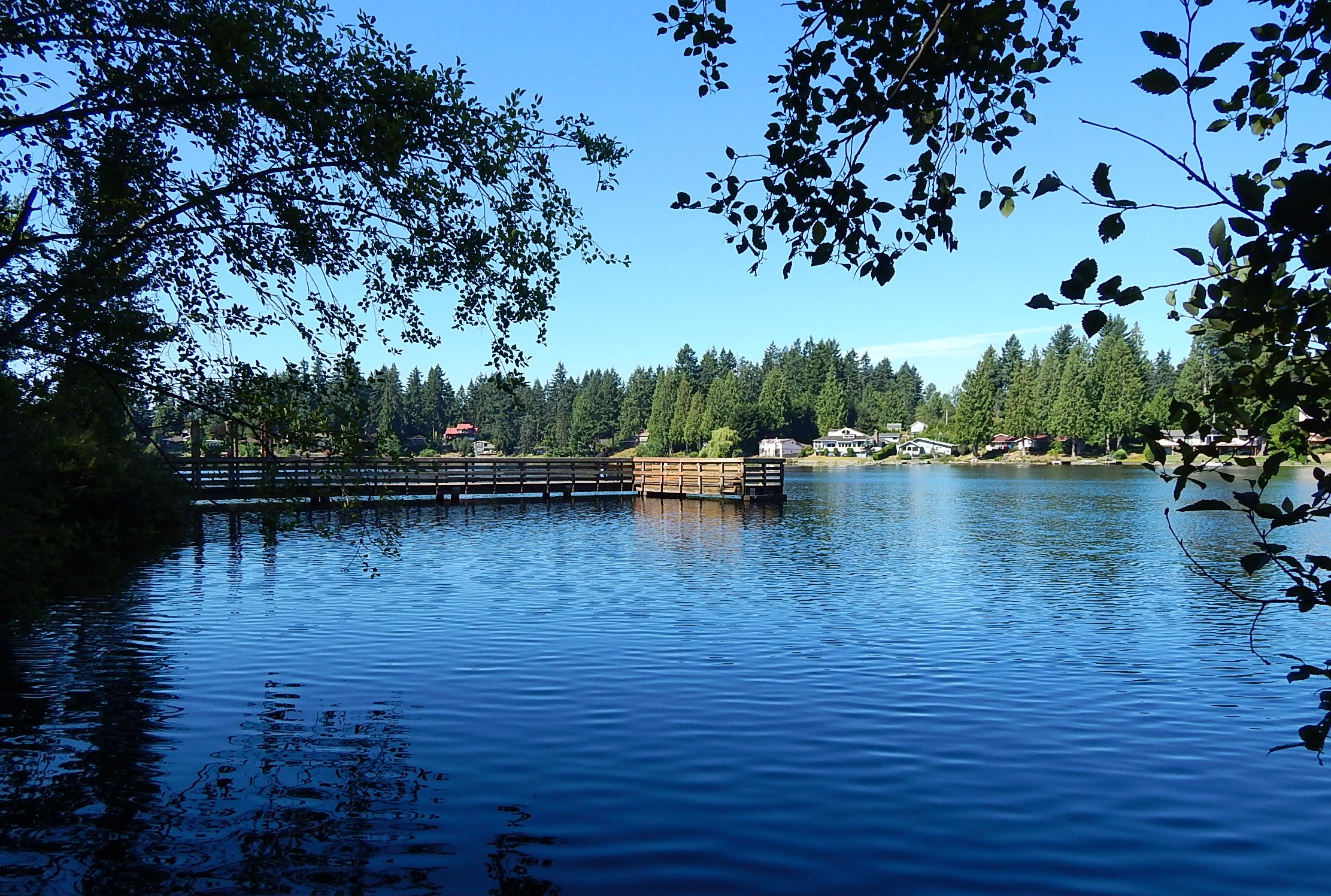
- View from Fivemile Lake Park

- Location within Washington (state) Location within the United States
- Location: Lakeland South, Washington
- Coordinates: 47.272799°N 122.285686°W
- Basin countries: United States
- Surface area: 35.50 acres (14.37 ha)
- Max. depth: 32 ft (9.8 m)
- Surface elevation: 377 ft (115 m)

Fivemile Lake is located in southern King County, Washington in the Lakeland South census-designated place. It has a popular park on its eastern bank. Fivemile Lake is one of several lakes in Lakeland South, including Lake Killarney, Lake Geneva, and Trout Lake.

== History ==
Military Road runs along the eastern shore of the lake, next to the park. This road, built in the 1850s, once linked Fort Steilacoom with Fort Bellingham. The road's construction was authorized in 1857 to defend against Native American hostilities and the threat of foreign naval attacks. The road would help move supplies and troops between the forts, and would encourage further settlement of the area. Construction began in 1858, and the road was completed by 1860. The road connects Fivemile Lake to Star Lake and Angle Lake.

== Description ==
Fivemile Lake is popular for fishing. The lake is stocked with rainbow trout, and also has bluegill and largemouth bass. Due to high nutrient concentrations, Fivemile lake is moderately eutrophic.

Fivemile Lake Park is run by King County. Its amenities include fields, trails, and a dock. A new playground opened in 2016.

On April 5, 2023, one kayaker was killed and another was hospitalized after their boats capsized. The fire chief stressed the importance of life jackets, as neither kayaker was wearing one.
