= Lake Geneva (Washington) =

Lake in King County, Washington

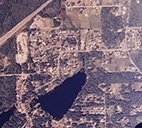
- Aerial view of Lake Geneva, south of SR 18. The tip of Lake Killarney is visible just to the southwest of Lake Geneva

- Location within Washington (state) Location within the United States
- Location: Lakeland South, Washington
- Coordinates: 47.291536°N 122.281304°W
- Basin countries: United States
- Surface area: 27.50 acres (11.13 ha)
- Max. depth: 46 ft (14 m)
- Surface elevation: 372 ft (113 m)

Lake Geneva is a lake located in southern King County, Washington, in the Lakeland South census-designated place. While largely surrounded by residential private property, it is also home to the popular Lake Geneva Park. It is located just across the street from Lake Killarney. Lake Geneva is one of several lakes in Lakeland South, including Lake Killarney, Fivemile Lake, and Trout Lake.

Lake Geneva is mostly surrounded by homes and forest. Lake Geneva Park is located on the northeast shore, and is home to grassy sports fields, forest trails, and a fishing dock. In addition to the fishing dock at the park, there is a Washington State Department of Fish and Wildlife boat ramp on the northwest shore. Fish species in the lake include bluegill, largemouth bass, and rainbow trout (stocked).

The lake is managed by a special district. Its priorities include maintaining the health of the lake through noxious weed, algae, and water quality management, waterfowl control, and maintaining the watershed and lake outlet.
