= Lakeland North, Washington =

- Census-designated place
- Location of Lakeland North, Washington
- Coordinates: 47°20′15″N 122°16′52″W
- Country: United States
- State: Washington
- County: King

Area
  - Total: 3.36 sq mi (8.69 km^{2})
  - Land: 3.25 sq mi (8.41 km^{2})
  - Water: 0.11 sq mi (0.28 km^{2})
- Elevation: 410 ft (120 m)

Population (2020)
  - Total: 13,663
  - Density: 4,210/sq mi (1,620/km^{2})
- Time zone: UTC-8 (Pacific (PST))
  - Summer (DST): UTC-7 (PDT)
- FIPS code: 53-37420
- GNIS feature ID: 2408558

Lakeland North is a census-designated place (CDP) in King County, Washington, United States. The population was 13,663 at the 2020 census. Part of the community was annexed into neighboring Auburn in 2008.

== Geography ==
Lakeland North is located in southwestern King County and is bordered to the east by Auburn, to the south and west by Federal Way, and to the north by Kent. Interstate 5 runs along the west edge of the community, with access from Exit 143 (South 320th Street) at the southwest corner of the CDP and from Exit 147 (South 272nd Street) at the northwest corner. I-5 leads north 21 miles (34 km) to downtown Seattle and south 11 miles (18 km) to Tacoma.

According to the United States Census Bureau, the Lakeland North CDP has a total area of 3.4 square miles (8.7 km^{2}), of which 3.2 square miles (8.4 km^{2}) are land and 0.1 square miles (0.3 km^{2}), or 3.24%, are water. Lake Dolloff is in the southern part of the community, and Star Lake is in the north.

== Demographics ==
Historical population
Census	Pop.	Note	%±
1980	11,648		—
1990	14,402		23.6%
2000	15,085		4.7%
2010	12,942		−14.2%
2020	13,663		5.6%
U.S. Decennial Census; 1970 1980 1990; 2000 2010

Lakeland North first appeared as a census designated place in the 1980 U.S. census.

=== 2020 census ===
As of the 2020 census, Lakeland North had a population of 13,663. The median age was 38.9 years. 22.3% of residents were under the age of 18 and 13.5% of residents were 65 years of age or older. For every 100 females there were 99.0 males, and for every 100 females age 18 and over there were 98.5 males age 18 and over.

100.0% of residents lived in urban areas, while 0.0% lived in rural areas.

There were 4,423 households in Lakeland North, of which 34.7% had children under the age of 18 living in them. Of all households, 57.3% were married-couple households, 14.7% were households with a male householder and no spouse or partner present, and 20.5% were households with a female householder and no spouse or partner present. About 16.1% of all households were made up of individuals and 5.6% had someone living alone who was 65 years of age or older.

There were 4,559 housing units, of which 3.0% were vacant. The homeowner vacancy rate was 0.8% and the rental vacancy rate was 3.9%.

Racial composition as of the 2020 census
Race	Number	Percent
White	7,192	52.6%
Black or African American	1,063	7.8%
American Indian and Alaska Native	104	0.8%
Asian	2,377	17.4%
Native Hawaiian and Other Pacific Islander	300	2.2%
Some other race	1,100	8.1%
Two or more races	1,527	11.2%
Hispanic or Latino (of any race)	1,992	14.6%

=== 2000 census ===
At the 2000 census there were 15,085 people, 4,978 households, and 4,101 families in the CDP. The population density was 2,841.4 people per square mile (1,096.9/km^{2}). There were 5,067 housing units at an average density of 954.4/sq mi (368.4/km^{2}). The racial makup was 82.45% White, 3.41% African American, 1.07% Native American, 6.95% Asian, 0.50% Pacific Islander, 1.62% from other races, and 4.00% from two or more races. Hispanic or Latino of any race were 3.56%.

Of the 4,978 households 43.3% had children under the age of 18 living with them, 68.8% were married couples living together, 8.8% had a female householder with no husband present, and 17.6% were non-families. 12.0% of households were one person and 2.9% were one person aged 65 or older. The average household size was 3.03 and the average family size was 3.29.

The age distribution was 30.0% under the age of 18, 7.0% from 18 to 24, 31.6% from 25 to 44, 24.5% from 45 to 64, and 6.8% 65 or older. The median age was 36 years. For every 100 females there were 98.5 males. For every 100 females age 18 and over, there were 97.3 males.

The median household income was $62,292 and the median family income was $64,158. Males had a median income of $45,199 versus $31,753 for females. The per capita income was $23,776. About 3.4% of families and 5.1% of the population were below the poverty line, including 5.7% of those under age 18 and 4.2% of those age 65 or over.
