= Lake Dolloff =

Lake in King County, Washington

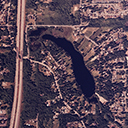
- Aerial view of Lake Dolloff, I-5 can be seen to the west

- Location within Washington (state) Location within the United States
- Location: Lakeland North, Washington
- Coordinates: 47.325218°N 122.286404°W
- Basin countries: United States
- Surface area: 20.30 acres (8.22 ha)
- Max. depth: 19 ft (5.8 m)
- Surface elevation: 414 ft (126 m)

Lake Dolloff is located in southern King County, Washington in the Lakeland North census-designated place. It is one of two large lakes in Lakeland North, alongside Star Lake. Interstate 5 runs just to the west of the lake, and Steel Lake is located on the other side of I-5.

== Description ==
Lake Dolloff is stocked annually with rainbow trout by the Washington State Department of Fish and Wildlife. In addition to the stocked rainbow trout, black crappie, bluegill, brown bullhead, coastal cutthroat trout, largemouth bass, rock bass, smallmouth bass, and yellow perch are naturally present in the lake. There is a public parking lot and lake access area on the southeast end of the lake.

Lake Dolloff has a 518-acre (210 ha) watershed. Nutrient concentrations are consistently high, leading to its classification as a eutrophic lake.

== Lake Dolloff Substation ==
The King County Sheriff's Office maintains Lake Dolloff substation, which services Lake Dolloff and other nearby areas of unincorporated King County. The station was refurbished in 2012.
