= Ida Applebroog =

American painter and sculptor (1929–2023)

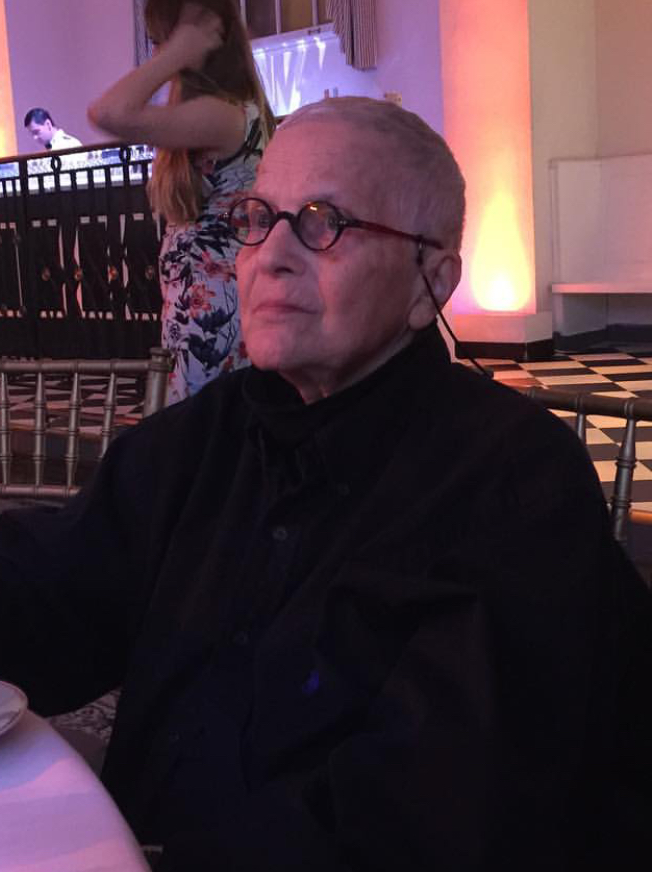
- Applebroog in 2017
- Born: Ida Appelbaum; November 11, 1929; The Bronx, New York, U.S.
- Died: October 21, 2023 (aged 93); Manhattan, New York, U.S.
- Known for: Painting
- Awards: MacArthur Fellowship

Ida Applebroog (November 11, 1929 – October 21, 2023) was an American multi-media artist who was best-known for her paintings and sculptures that explore the themes of gender, sexual identity, violence, and politics. Applebroog was the recipient of multiple honors including the MacArthur Fellowship "Genius Grant", the College Art Association Distinguished Art Award for Lifetime Achievement, and an Honorary Doctorate of Fine Arts from the New School for Social Research/Parsons School of Design. Applebroog lived in New York City and is represented by Hauser & Wirth.

== Life and work ==
Ida Applebroog was born as Ida Applebaum on November 11, 1929, in the Bronx, New York, into an ultra-Orthodox Jewish family. In her household was her father, Isidore Applebaum, his wife, Sara, his older daughter Frieda, and eight years later came Gloria Bornstein, who also became an artist. Growing up, her environment was hostile and not the happiest but despite that, she was able to develop her creative skills. After she completed high school, she started working for her father who was a furrier. But after she faced sexual harassment from some customers while modeling the fur coats her father made, she stopped working for him. From 1948 to 1950, she attended NY State Institute of Applied Arts and Sciences. At the Institute, she studied graphic design rather than fine art. Applebroog stated that she, "couldn't make art without also making money." While studying at NY State Institute of Applied Arts and Sciences, she began to work at an advertising agency where she was the only woman. Applebroog later recounted, "In those days sexual harassment was a day-to-day event. I held out in the ad agency for six months, then resigned."

After resigning from the advertising agency, Applebroog went on to work as a freelance illustrator for children's books and greeting cards. In 1950, she married Gideon Horowitz, her high school sweetheart. She took a job in the art division of the New York Public Library. She also began to take night classes at City College of New York during this time. By 1960, Applebroog had four children and in order for her husband to complete his doctorate, Applebroog and her family had to move to Chicago. After moving to Chicago Applebroog took courses at the School of the Art Institute of Chicago and made jewelry in her family's basement that her husband and children would sell at art fairs.

In 1968 Applebroog and her family relocated again to Southern California where her husband accepted an academic position. While living in San Diego, California, Applebroog began sketching close-ups of her own naked body, specifically her crotch, while in the bathtub, a series of more than 150 works she would not exhibit until 2010. In 1969 Applebroog was briefly hospitalized for depression, during which time she began making bathtub sketches. She was released by 1970 and promptly began to continue making art in her studio in San Diego. Once she returned from her hospitalization, she began to create sculptures of "biomorphic forms made from fabric" amongst much other art. At the age of forty-four she participated in one of her earliest group exhibitions, entitled Invisible/Visible in 1972 at Long Beach Museum of Art.

The following year Applebroog went to the Feminist Artists Conference at California Institute of the Arts, where she spoke with many women artists and was highly influenced by their enthusiasm toward social activism in art. Applebroog moved back to New York City in 1974. It was there, after changing her name from "Ida Horowitz" to "Ida Applebroog" (based on her maiden name, Applebaum), where she began to develop her own signature artistic style with a series of cartoonlike figures that merged the comic-strip format with the advertising industry's use of story-boards to explain a concept.

Starting in 1977 she circulated a series of self-published books through the mail, called Stagings to artists and writers and joined Heresies: A Feminist Publication on Art and Politics, alongside feminist curators and artists such as Lucy R. Lippard and May Stevens, among others. The covers of the publications had cryptic messages and inside of them were cartoonish drawings with captions. She made a list of 500 writers and artists that she knew or liked and mailed them in bulk. In 1981 she showed Applebroog: Silent Stagings, her first exhibition at Ronald Feldman Fine Arts in New York City, where she continued to show for over 20 years. Applebroog stated that the subject of her work is "how power works--male over female, parents over children, governments over people, doctors over patients."

In 2005 she was profiled in the PBS documentary Art 21: Art in the Twenty-first Century. In 2010, Applebroog's works on paper, including her 1969 sketches, were exhibited in a solo show entitled Ida Applebroog: Monalisa at Hauser & Wirth in New York City, and in 2011 at Hauser & Wirth in London. In 2016 Applebroog was the subject of the documentary Call Her Applebroog, directed by her daughter Beth B.

In 2020, Ida Applebroog's work was included in a major group show at the Pérez Art Museum Miami, Florida. My Body, My Rules, presented an investigation about the diverse artistic practices of 23 female-identified artists in the 21st-century. Louise Bourgeois, Carolee Schneemann, Cindy Sherman, Lorna Simpson, Ana Mendieta, Wanguechi Mutu, Mickalene Thomas, and Francesca Woodman, were also among them.

Ida Applebroog died on October 21, 2023, at the age of 93.

== Selected works ==
=== Books ===
- Galileo Works, 1977, Self Published
- Dyspepsia Works, 1979, Self Published
- Blue Books, 1981, Self Published

=== Images from exhibitions ===
- dOCUMENTA (13) Images from the exhibition

== Select public collections ==
- The Corcoran Museum of Art
- The Metropolitan Museum of Art
- Museum of Modern Art
- Guggenheim Museum
- Whitney Museum of Art

== Awards and grants ==
- Artist's Fellowship, National Endowment for the Arts, 1980
- Creative Artists in Public Service Program, New York State Council on the Arts, 1983
- Artist's Fellowship, National Endowment for the Arts, 1985
- Guggenheim Fellowship, 1990
- Milton Avery Distinguished Chair, Bard College, 1991–92
- Lifetime Achievement Award, College Art Association, 1995
- Honorary Doctorate, New School University/Parsons School of Design, 1997
- MacArthur Foundation Fellowship, 1998
- Women's Caucus for Art Lifetime Achievement Award, 2008
- Anonymous Was A Woman Award, 2009
