= Lakeland South, Washington =

- Census-designated place
- Location of Lakeland South, Washington
- Coordinates: 47°16′43″N 122°16′58″W
- Country: United States
- State: Washington
- County: King

Area
  - Total: 5.12 sq mi (13.26 km^{2})
  - Land: 4.98 sq mi (12.89 km^{2})
  - Water: 0.15 sq mi (0.38 km^{2})
- Elevation: 413 ft (126 m)

Population (2020)
  - Total: 13,169
  - Density: 2,646/sq mi (1,022/km^{2})
- Time zone: UTC-8 (Pacific (PST))
  - Summer (DST): UTC-7 (PDT)
- FIPS code: 53-37430
- GNIS feature ID: 2408559

Lakeland South is a census-designated place (CDP) in King County, Washington, United States. The population was 13,169 at the 2020 census.

Based on per capita income, one of the more reliable measures of affluence, Lakeland South ranks 65th of 522 areas in the state of Washington to be ranked.

== Geography ==
Lakeland South is located in southwestern King County and is bordered to the north and west by the city of Federal Way, to the northeast by Auburn, to the east by Algona and Pacific, and to the south by Milton and Edgewood. The boundary with Edgewood is the Pierce County line. Interstate 5 touches the northwest edge of the community, Washington State Route 18 runs along the northern edge, and State Route 167 runs just east of the eastern edge. Downtown Tacoma is 9 miles (14 km) to the west, and downtown Seattle is 25 miles (40 km) to the north.

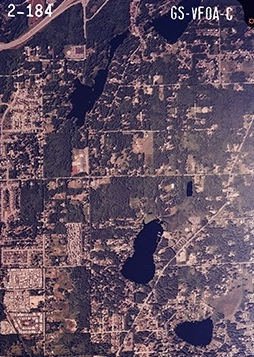
Visible in this aerial photo is Lake Geneva (in the northeast), Lake Killarney (directly southwest of Lake Geneva), Fivemile Lake (the largest lake in the image), and Trout Lake (to the southeast of Fivemile Lake).

According to the United States Census Bureau, the Lakeland South CDP has a total area of 5.1 square miles (13.3 km^{2}), of which 5.0 square miles (12.9 km^{2}) are land and 0.2 square miles (0.4 km^{2}), or 2.84%, are water. Water bodies in the community include Trout Lake, Fivemile Lake, Lake Killarney, and Lake Geneva.

== Demographics ==
Historical population
Census	Pop.	Note	%±
1980	5,225		—
1990	9,027		72.8%
2000	11,436		26.7%
2010	11,574		1.2%
2020	13,169		13.8%
U.S. Decennial Census; 1970 1980 1990; 2000 2010

Lakeland South first appeared as a census designated place in the 1980 U.S. census.

=== 2020 census ===
As of the 2020 census, Lakeland South had a population of 13,169. The median age was 39.2 years. 22.4% of residents were under the age of 18 and 14.7% of residents were 65 years of age or older. For every 100 females there were 100.5 males, and for every 100 females age 18 and over there were 101.0 males age 18 and over.

100.0% of residents lived in urban areas, while 0.0% lived in rural areas.

There were 4,489 households in Lakeland South, of which 32.9% had children under the age of 18 living in them. Of all households, 59.4% were married-couple households, 16.2% were households with a male householder and no spouse or partner present, and 17.4% were households with a female householder and no spouse or partner present. About 17.6% of all households were made up of individuals and 8.0% had someone living alone who was 65 years of age or older.

There were 4,660 housing units, of which 3.7% were vacant. The homeowner vacancy rate was 1.2% and the rental vacancy rate was 2.6%.

Racial composition as of the 2020 census
Race	Number	Percent
White	8,117	61.6%
Black or African American	709	5.4%
American Indian and Alaska Native	137	1.0%
Asian	1,780	13.5%
Native Hawaiian and Other Pacific Islander	237	1.8%
Some other race	850	6.5%
Two or more races	1,339	10.2%
Hispanic or Latino (of any race)	1,589	12.1%

=== 2000 census ===
At the 2000 census, there were 11,436 people, 4,135 households and 3,163 families residing in the CDP. The population density was 2,113.2 per square mile (816.2/km^{2}). There were 4,241 housing units at an average density of 783.7/sq mi (302.7/km^{2}). The racial makeup of the CDP was 83.94% White, 3.69% African-American, 0.87% Native American, 6.09% Asian, 0.42% Pacific Islander, 1.15% from other races, and 3.83% from two or more races. Hispanic or Latino of any race were 3.33% of the population.

There were 4,135 households, of which 38.2% had children under the age of 18 living with them, 64.5% were married couples living together, 8.0% had a female householder with no husband present, and 23.5% were non-families. 17.4% of all households were made up of individuals, and 5.4% had someone living alone who was 65 years of age or older. The average household size was 2.76 and the average family size was 3.12.

27.6% of the population were under the age of 18, 6.8% from 18 to 24, 33.0% from 25 to 44, 23.5% from 45 to 64, and 9.1% who were 65 years of age or older. The median age was 36 years. For every 100 females there were 99.8 males. For every 100 females age 18 and over, there were 100.9 males.

The median household income was $62,529 and the median family income was $64,223. Males had a median income of $48,584 versus $34,398 for females. The per capita income for the CDP was $26,833. About 4.3% of families and 5.3% of the population were below the poverty line, including 7.0% of those under age 18 and 2.3% of those age 65 or over.
