= Lake Killarney (Washington) =

Lake in King County, Washington

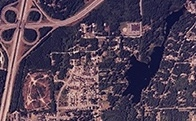
- Aerial view of Lake Killarney, near the junction of I-5 and SR 18. Lake Geneva is located just to the northeast of Lake Killarney

- Location within Washington (state) Location within the United States
- Location: Federal Way, Washington and Lakeland South, Washington
- Coordinates: 47.286263°N 122.290801°W
- Basin countries: United States
- Surface area: 29.30 acres (11.86 ha)
- Max. depth: 15 ft (4.6 m)
- Surface elevation: 372 ft (113 m)

Lake Killarney is a lake in King County, Washington. It is located on the city line of Federal Way, Washington and the Lakeland South, Washington census designated place. It is popular for recreation, with fishing opportunities and a public park. The lake has suffered from arsenic pollution. Lake Killarney is one of several lakes in Lakeland South, including Lake Geneva, Fivemile Lake, and Trout Lake.

== Description ==
Lake Killarney Open Space Park is a large park located on the lake's western shore. There is also a Washington State Department of Fish and Wildlife boat ramp on the northeastern corner, across the road from Lake Geneva. It has many fish species, including bluegill, brown bullhead, largemouth bass, pumpkinseed sunfish, rainbow trout, and yellow perch.

Lake Killarney has a 185-acre (75 ha) watershed. It is a moderately productive, mesotrophic lake. Nutrient concentrations have been generally decreasing over time, improving water quality.

== Arsenic pollution ==
Lake Killarney is located 15 miles (24 km) downwind of a former ASARCO copper smelter in Tacoma, Washington. Arsenic and lead blew downwind, contaminating Lake Killarney and the surrounding area. Researchers at the University of Washington have found that shallow lakes, such as Lake Killarney, have higher surface water concentrations of arsenic than deeper lakes, such as Angle Lake. They hypothesize that this occurs due to incomplete stratification in shallow lakes, preventing arsenic from settling at the bottom. In addition, phytoplankton can absorb arsenic instead of chemically similar phosphorus. This then harms other organisms through the effects of biomagnification and bioaccumulation.
