= Star Lake (Washington) =

Lake in King County, Washington

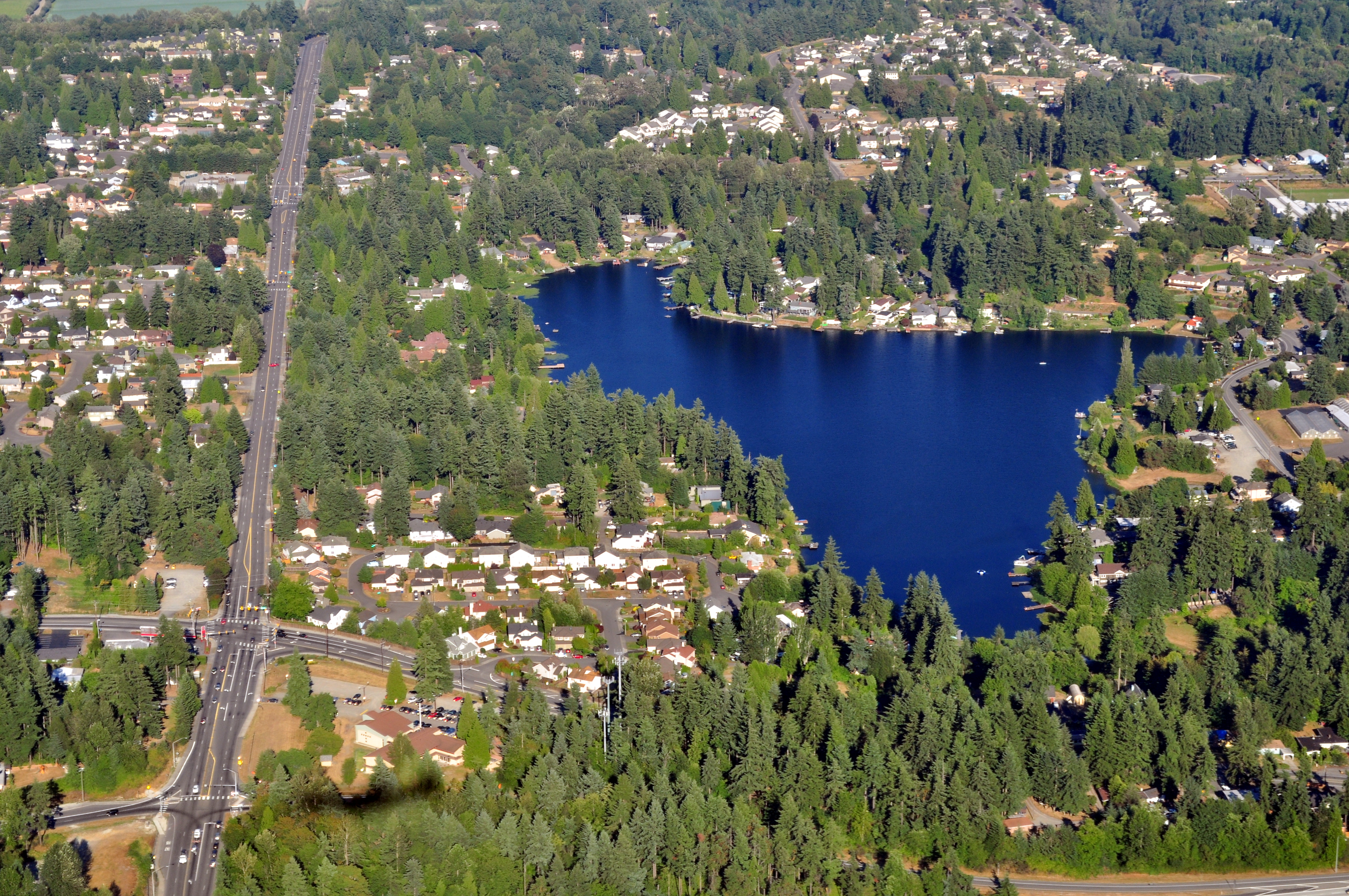
- Star Lake from the west

- Location within Washington (state) Location within the United States
- Location: Lakeland North, Washington
- Coordinates: 47.354909°N 122.287071°W
- Basin countries: United States
- Surface area: 32.60 acres (13.19 ha)
- Max. depth: 50 ft (15 m)
- Surface elevation: 336 ft (102 m)

Star Lake is located in southern King County, Washington in the Lakeland North census-designated place. It is one of two large lakes in Lakeland North, alongside Lake Dolloff. Interstate 5 runs just to the west of the lake.

== History ==
In the 1850s, Military Road was built to link Fort Steilacoom with Fort Bellingham. The road passes by many lakes, which served as army campgrounds. This includes three lakes in South King County: Angle Lake, Star Lake, and Fivemile Lake. The road was completed in 1860.

In 1892, the Star Lake Post Office opened near the lake. The Star Lake School opened in 1898, and was subsequently rebuilt in 1909 and 1910. The old school building still exists near the lake. The modern Star Lake Elementary School is also located near the lake, and is run by Federal Way Public Schools.

== Description ==
The lake is oligotrophic, and enjoys excellent water quality. It has been treated for Eurasian milfoil in the past, a noxious weed. Star Lake is stocked with rainbow trout, and is also home to largemouth bass. However, the lake is mostly surrounded by private homes and the only public access is a boat ramp at the end of 37th Avenue South.

Star Lake is a Link light rail station on the Federal Way Link Extension. The station is located to the northwest of the lake, across Interstate 5. The name was chosen in 2022, and the station was scheduled to open along with the rest of the Federal Way Extension in 2024. However, soil issues from building a bridge over a wetland pushed the opening to December 6, 2025.
