= Celebration Park, Federal Way =

Park in Federal Way, Washington

Coordinates: 47.307°N 122.320°W

Celebration Park
- Interactive map of Celebration Park
- Location: Federal Way, Washington
- Area: 83.5 acres (33.8 ha)

Celebration Park is the largest and most frequented park in Federal Way, Washington.

The park is 83.5 acres and contains a children's play structure, four lighted baseball fields, four lighted soccer fields and trails and pathways connecting to the BPA Trail. It also includes a community center. It is located at 1095 S. 324th Street.

== History ==
The land on which Celebration Park now sits was originally the Evergreen commercial airstrip, with a single northeast/southeast 2200-foot runway. Construction began in 1948. The airstrip was owned by 60 members of a flying club in Federal Way made up by Boeing employees which was founded in 1946. The airstrip was described as "pretty rough, adjacent to a junkyard, and the runway was just a slot cut through the tall fir trees with a very rough dirt and glacial rock runway that often dented propellers & tail feathers too."

The airport was used during the Seattle World Fair, by a charter service providing scenic tours of the Pacific Northwest, by law enforcement planes when patrolling the highways around the Federal Way area, and as an emergency landing strip for commercial flights which got into trouble after taking off from Sea-Tac. The airfield was in operation until 1979.

The idea for a community park on the area was first proposed in 1988 after proposals were made to build an office park on the land. The area was the only remaining open area in Federal Way. The land was purchased by the City of Federal Way in December 1990.

The name "Celebration Park" was chosen in 1992 following a naming contest with 75 entries by local residents.

In September 2006, was used to host the Senior Softball World Championships.
