= Maxine Martell =

American artist

- Born: Maxine Martell; 1937 (age 87–88); Muskogee, OK

Maxine Martell (born 1937) is an American artist. Her work is included in the collections of the Smithsonian American Art Museum, the Henry Art Gallery, Seattle and the Northwest Museum of Arts and Culture.
