= Dash Point State Park =

State park in King County, the U.S. state of Washington

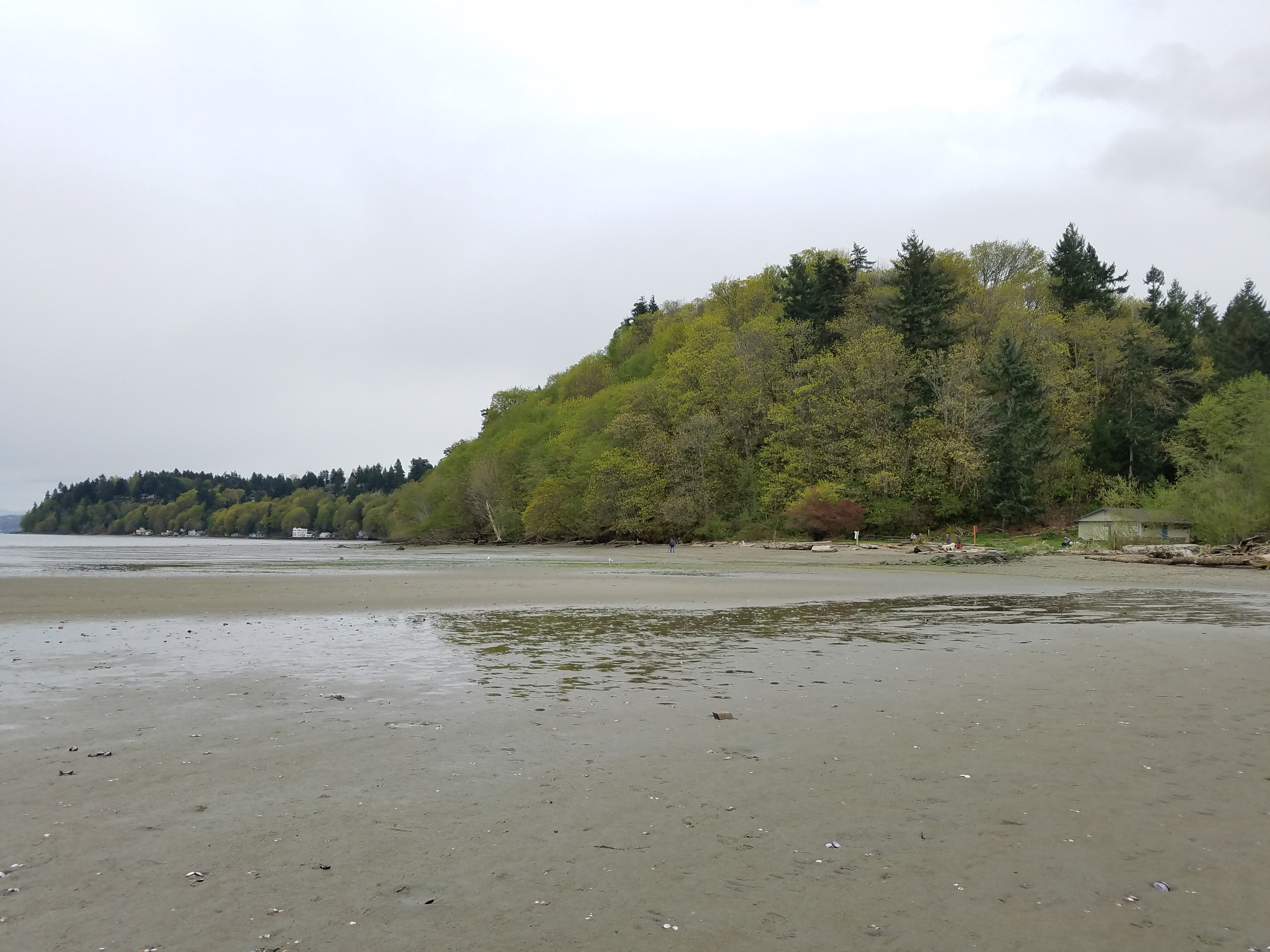
- Beach at Dash Point

- Location within Washington (state) Location within the United States
- Interactive map of Dash Point State Park
- Location: King and Pierce counties, Washington, United States
- Coordinates: 47°18′52″N 122°24′22″W
- Area: 398 acres (161 ha)
- Elevation: 184 ft (56 m)
- Established: 1958 (purchase); 1962 (dedication)
- Administrator: Washington State Parks and Recreation Commission
- Website: Official website

Dash Point State Park is a 398-acre (161 ha) Washington public recreation area on Puget Sound that straddles the line between King and Pierce counties. The state park has over 3,300 feet (1,000 m) of shoreline, 140 campsites, 11 miles of trails for hiking and mountain biking, and offers beachcombing, fishing, swimming, birdwatching, windsurfing, skimboarding, and wildlife viewing.

== History ==
Prior to being known as Dash Point the area was known as lson Landing, Fairview Beach, and Woodstock Beach. The origin of the name Dash Point is unclear. The area was named Dash Point on official maps by 1877. Land for the state park was purchased by the state in 1958 at the urging of local resident Carl Anderson. A park bench was dedicated in his name in 2018. (Note: A previous version of the park's website reported that the land was sold by the McLeod family to the State of Washington in the late 1940s and that it was dedicated and developed in 1962 for the Seattle World's Fair.)

== Recreational Activities ==
Dash Point State Park is a popular destination for residents of Federal Way during the summer months. Due to the tide patterns on the point, low tides reveal large areas of beach providing ample space for people to enjoy. It is common to see skim boarders on the beach. There is a yearly competition held by Dash Boards each summer.

The trails in the park are popular with runners. Entrances to the trail network can be found along many parts of the park in Federal Way and North East Tacoma.
