= Federal Way, Washington =

- City
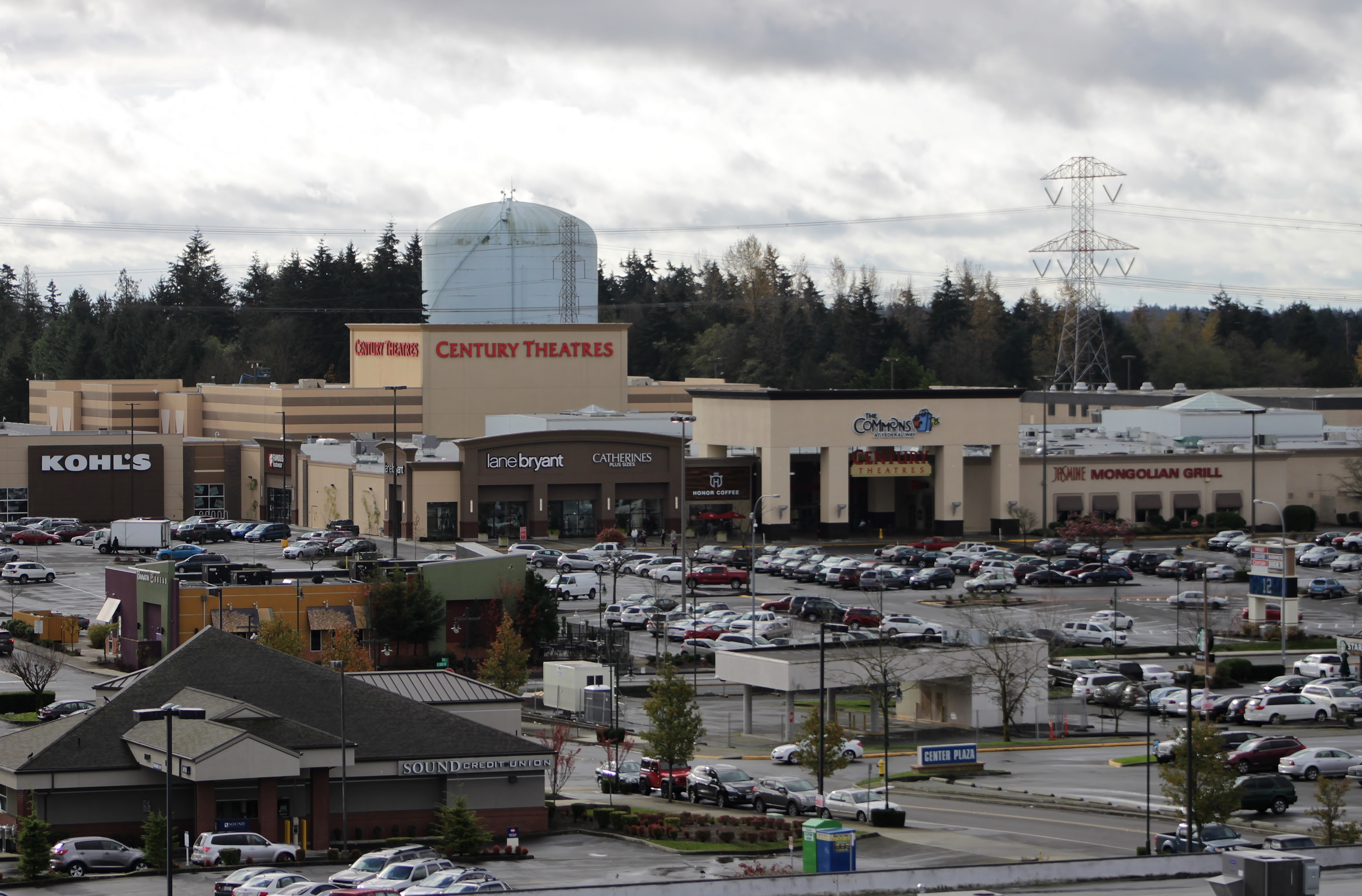
- The Commons at Federal Way shopping center, pictured in 2016

- Brandmark
- Motto(s): "It's all within reach", "Centered on opportunity"
- Location of Federal Way in King County

- Location in the United States
- Coordinates: 47°18′48″N 122°22′20″W
- Country: United States
- State: Washington
- County: King
- Incorporated: February 28, 1990

Government
  - Type: Mayor–council
  - Mayor: Jim Ferrell

Area
  - Total: 23.72 sq mi (61.43 km^{2})
  - Land: 22.31 sq mi (57.79 km^{2})
  - Water: 1.41 sq mi (3.64 km^{2})
- Elevation: 417 ft (127 m)

Population (2020)
  - Total: 101,030
  - Estimate (2024): 100,252
  - Rank: US: 339th WA: 10th
  - Density: 4,370/sq mi (1,689/km^{2})
- Time zone: UTC−8 (Pacific (PST))
  - Summer (DST): UTC−7 (PDT)
- ZIP Codes: 98001, 98003, 98023, 98063, 98093
- Area code: 253
- FIPS code: 53-23515
- GNIS feature ID: 2410494
- Website: federalwaywa.gov

Federal Way is a city in King County, Washington, United States, and part of the Seattle metropolitan area. It is 25 miles (40 km) south of Seattle and had a population was 101,030 at the 2020 census. Federal Way is the 10th most populous city in Washington and the fifth most populous in King County.

The city's name originated from a local school district, which named itself for U.S. Route 99 in 1929. The highway was replaced by Interstate 5, which made Federal Way into a bedroom community for commuters. After three votes on incorporation failed, the city was created in 1990. Federal Way has been the terminus of the Link light rail system's 1 Line since 2025.

== History ==
Originally a logging settlement, the area was first called "Federal Way" when a consolidated school district was established in 1929. The name derived from U.S. Route 99 (now State Route 99 or Pacific Highway South), a federally-designated highway which ran through the state and connected Seattle to Tacoma. It followed an earlier road between Fort Steilacoom and Fort Bellingham that was completed in the 1850s and later became known as Military Road. The first homestead in the area was established in 1871 by Sam Stone near modern-day Redondo and was followed by other settlers. Five existing school districts consolidated operations into School District No. 210 in 1929 and planned construction of Federal Way High School, which opened in 1930 and gave its name to the school district. The local chamber of commerce adopted the name in the early 1950s.

New businesses, including motels and restaurants, moved to the Federal Way area in the 1940s and 1950s to serve the growing numbers of automobile travelers on the Pacific Highway. The first shopping mall in the future city, named Federal Shopping Way, opened in 1955 and included a small amusement park named Santafair and "Old World Square", which reproduced historic European buildings. The complex later grew to include historic Pacific Northwest buildings, including the log cabin of Seattle pioneer David Denny and a Catholic church from the Muckleshoot Indian Reservation, which were moved to the site in the 1960s. Federal Shopping Way was primarily home to small businesses and specialty retailers, but its amusement park and recreational areas were gradually closed by the 1980s. An effort to demolish Old World Square was resisted by the mall's businesses, who filed a lawsuit, but began in 1980 under the landlord's direction. The mall was demolished in 1995 and replaced by the Pavilions Centre, a conventional strip mall. The historic cabins were moved to a site near West Hylebos State Park and later restored by the local historical society.

A section of Interstate 5 through Federal Way opened to traffic in October 1962 and replaced U.S. Route 99 as the main north–south highway in the region. The highway brought residential growth to the area, which became a bedroom community for Seattle workers. Weyerhaeuser opened its headquarters complex on the east side of Interstate 5 in 1971 that was later expanded with a Bonsai museum and the Rhododendron Species Foundation and Botanical Garden. The company remained in Federal Way until moving to Seattle in 2016. An enclosed shopping center, named the SeaTac Mall, opened in 1975 with 43 stores and large big-box retailers to serve a regional clientele.

Attempts to incorporate Federal Way as a city were voted down in 1971, 1981 and 1985. The voters eventually approved incorporation as a city on February 28, 1990; the official act of incorporation was held at the Sportsworld Lanes bowling complex.

=== Growth since incorporation ===
As part of the Washington State Growth Management Act of 1990 (GMA), Federal Way has identified areas of unincorporated King County as Potential Annexation Areas (PAAs) to be annexed to the city. Federal Way's current PAAs include the Star Lake and Camelot neighborhoods in Lakeland North and the neighborhoods of Parkland, Lakeland, and Jovita in Lakeland South. All of these neighborhoods are located east of the city proper. In 2004, the city annexed the Northlake, East Redondo, and Parkway neighborhoods, adding over 2,700 people and nearly 1 square mile (2.6 km^{2}) of area. While Federal Way had previously considered Auburn's West Hill, Auburn annexed that along with Lea Hill in 2007.

In February 2007, the city announced formal plans to annex the majority of unincorporated land on its east border as one PAA named East Federal Way, comprising the Star Lake, Camelot, Lakeland, and Jovita neighborhoods, and a strip of Peasley Canyon Road connecting the two areas. Annexation of the area would add 20,000 people and nearly 7 square miles (18.1 km^{2}) to the city, creating the sixth largest city in Washington by population, at over 106,000 residents and nearly 29 square miles (75 km^{2}).

On August 21, 2007, residents of the proposed East Federal Way annexation area rejected annexation to Federal Way by a 66% to 34% margin. Opponents of the plan, favoring remaining under direct King County government, asserted fears that increased density and higher taxes would result from annexation despite proponents showing studies that taxes and fees would be, in the immediate, unchanged.

In 2011, opponents of annexation petitioned King County to designate this same area as a township, an undefined municipal structure that does not currently exist anywhere else in the state but which the state constitution provides for. Under the plan, township status would prevent the annexation of the area, which would be named Peasley Canyon Township. The King County Council declined to act on the proposal, and the county elections board denied the group a ballot item.

== Geography ==
Federal Way is located in the southwest corner of King County.

According to the United States Census Bureau, the city has a total area of 23.72 square miles (61.43 km^{2}), of which 22.32 square miles (57.81 km^{2}) is land and 1.40 square miles (3.63 km^{2}) is water.

The city is home to several lakes, including Steel Lake and Lake Killarney.

=== Major city and state parks ===
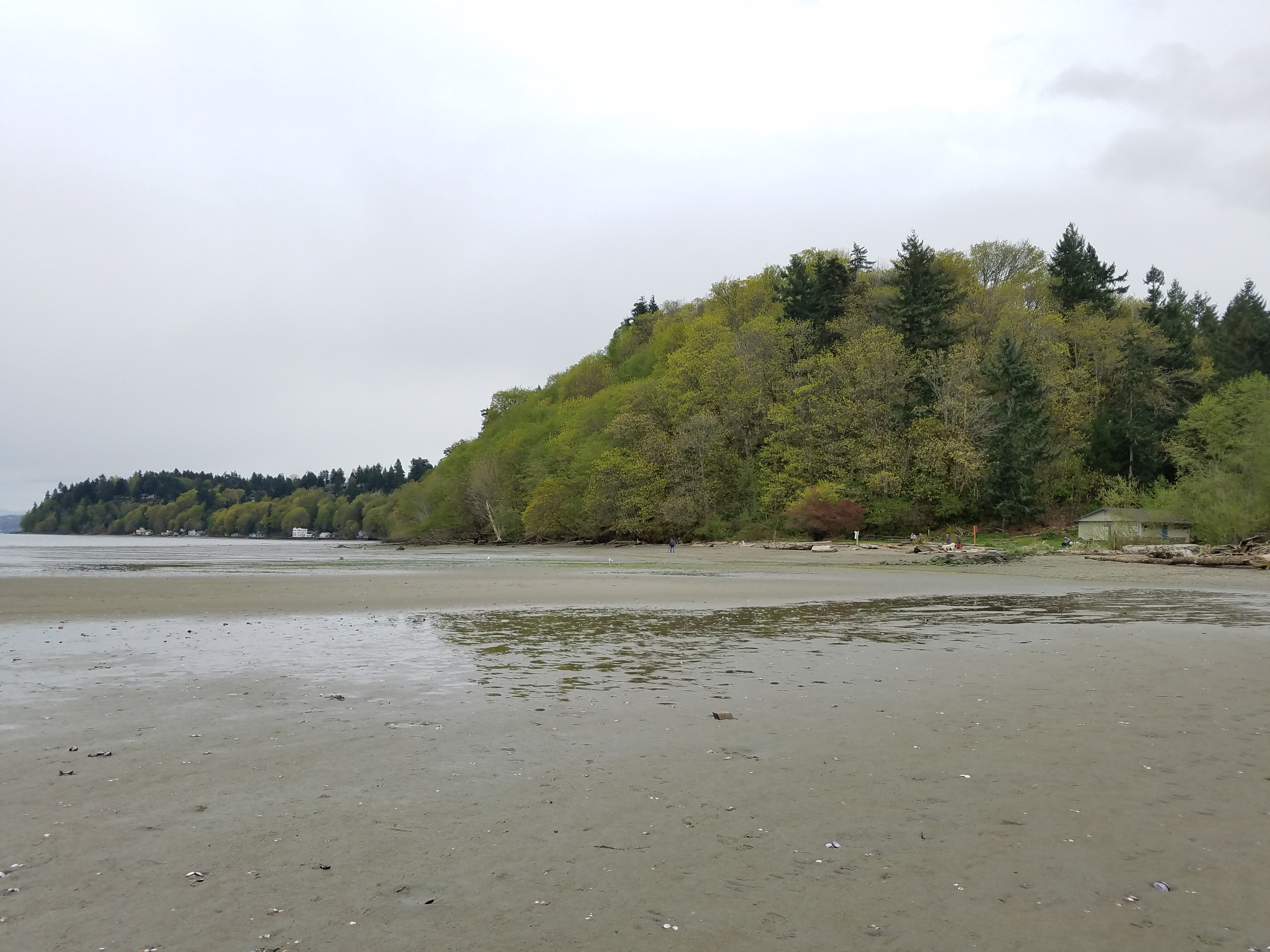
The beach at Dash Point State Park in western Federal Way

- Steel Lake Park – located on S 312th Street east of Pacific Hwy S; large lakefront area with picnic areas, playground, and boat launch.
- Celebration Park – on 11th Avenue S just south of S 324th Street; with sports fields and wooded trails, and Independence Day fireworks.
- Dash Point State Park – 53rd Avenue SW & SW Dash Point Road; the only developed waterfront park located within the city, including hiking trails and campground.
- West Hylebos Wetlands Park – at S 348th Street and 4th Avenue S, with hiking trails through wetlands. The park also features two iconic buildings: the nearby Barker Cabin built in 1883, which is the city's oldest known building, and the 22-by-22-foot (6.7 by 6.7 m) Denny Cabin, which was once located west of present-day Seattle Center. The Denny Cabin was built by David Denny in 1889 as a real-estate office and was made from trees cut down on Queen Anne Hill.
- Dumas Bay Centre Park – on SW Dash Point Road; includes a beach, picnic area and walking trail
- Lakota Park – on SW Dash Point Road; includes baseball field, softball field, football field and 440 yard running track
- Saghalie Park – at 19th Avenue SW; includes basketball court, 440-yard track, children's playground, soccer and football field, sand volleyball, tennis courts and baseball courts
- The BPA Trail is a three-mile (4.8 km) paved trail that follows the Bonneville Power Administration electricity transmission line from the entrance to Celebration Park west to approximately 18th Avenue SW, then south to the Pierce County border.

=== Climate ===
This region experiences warm (but not hot) and dry summers, with no average monthly temperatures above 71.6 °F. According to the Köppen Climate Classification system, Federal Way has a warm-summer Mediterranean climate, abbreviated "Csb" on climate maps.

== Economy and attractions ==
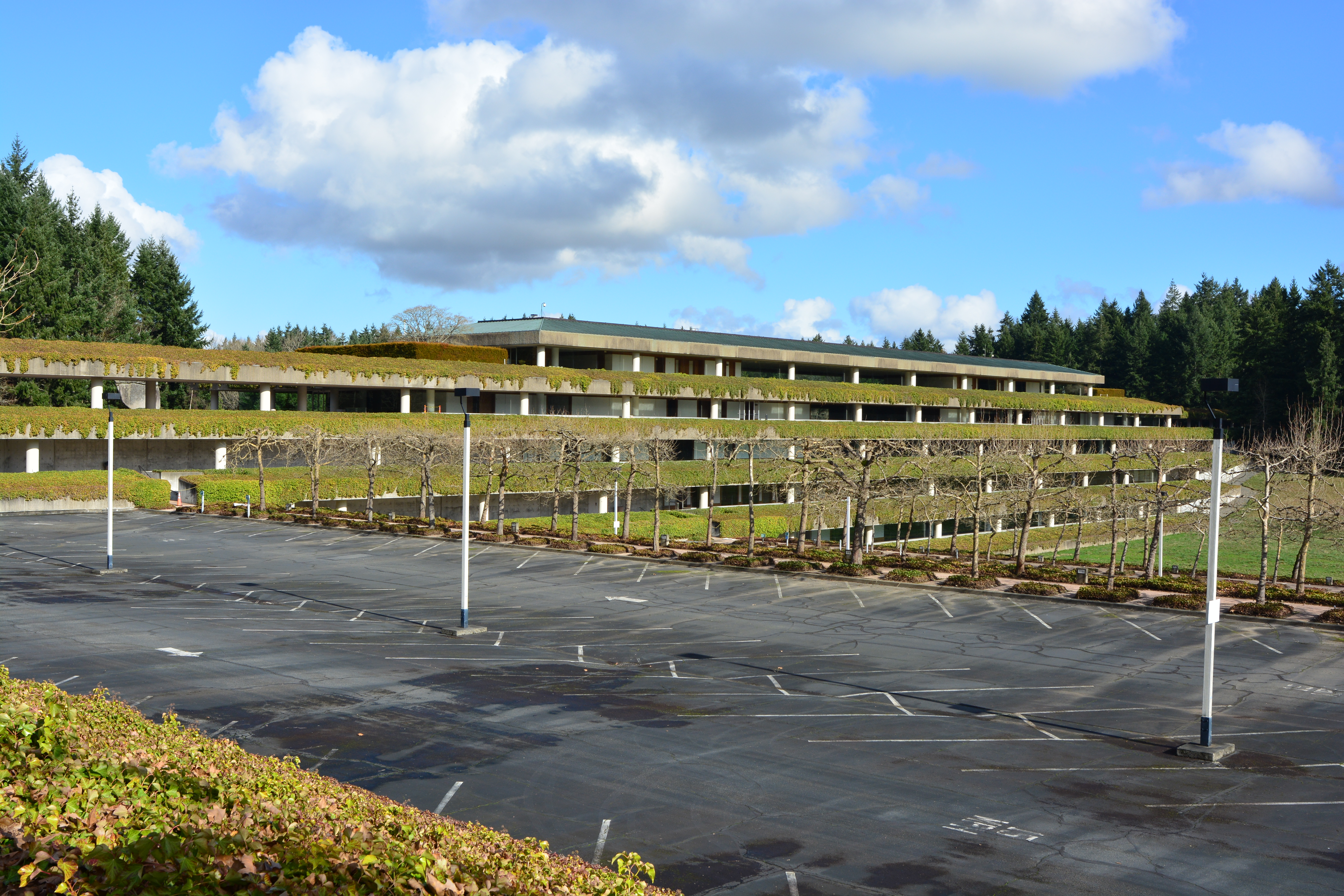
The former Weyerhaeuser headquarters

Until 2014, Federal Way was home to Weyerhaeuser, the largest private owner of softwood timberland in the world. Weyerhaeuser had opened much of its land in Federal Way to the public, including two botanical gardens: the Rhododendron Species Foundation and Botanical Garden, and the Pacific Bonsai Museum. In 2014, the company announced it would vacate its Federal Way headquarters. City leaders suggested promoting the location for a potential community college campus. Federal Way is also home to the US headquarters of World Vision International.

Other attractions in the city include the Weyerhaeuser King County Aquatic Center, which features an Olympic-size swimming pool which has been used for the 1990 Goodwill Games and 2012 US Olympic Swim & Dive Trials. Celebration Park includes sports fields, a playground, and wooded trails. The city has also developed many lakefront and neighborhood parks, playgrounds, and trails.

The 40-acre (16 ha) PowellsWood Garden, known for its outstanding structural plantings and perennial borders, is located off South Dash Point Road. This land, on a portion of the Cold Creek ravine, was purchased by Monte and Diane Powell in 1993 in order to preserve green space in an increasingly urbanized area.

Wild Waves Theme & Water Park, the largest amusement park in the region, opened in 1977 on the south side of the city. It is the Seattle area's only permanent amusement park. Six Flags purchased Wild Waves in December 2000. However, after low sales, Six Flags sold the park in April 2007 to Parc Management LLC of Jacksonville, Florida, for $31.75 million.

Federal Way is locally identified by its 1990s semi-urban development, characterized by landscaped off-street multi-structure apartment complexes and shopping centers. The Commons at Federal Way, the city's only indoor shopping mall, is located on South 320th Street and Pacific Highway South (State Route 99) near the city's main Interstate 5 exit.

=== Largest employers ===
According to Federal Way's 2022 Comprehensive Annual Financial Report, the largest employers in Federal Way are:

#	Employer	# of Employees
1	Federal Way Public Schools	2,349
2	World Vision International	1,712
3	CHI Franciscan Health - St. Francis Hospital	996
4	United States Postal Service	600
5	Washington Conference of Seventh-Day Adventists	500
6	Walmart Supercenter #3794	376
7	Community Integrated Services	364
8	Costco	352
9	City of Federal Way	339
10	Virginia Mason Federal Way Medical Center	325
11	Fred Meyer	303
12	Korean Women's Association	267
13	Walmart Discount Store #2571	228
14	MAKSU Inc.	220
15	The Home Depot	196

=== Downtown tower projects ===
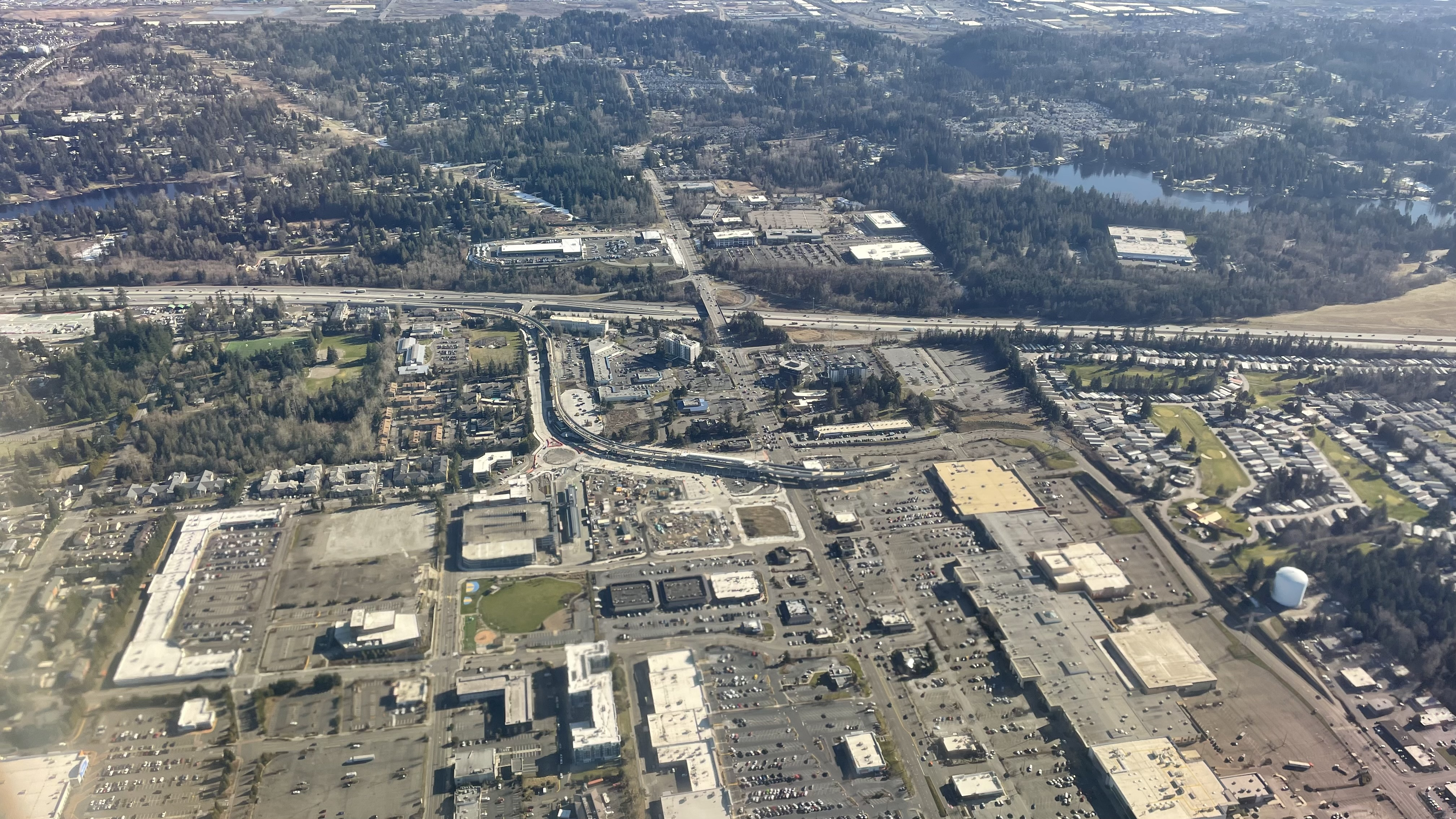
Aerial view of Downtown Federal Way in February 2025

In 2007, the city of Federal Way purchased a downtown lot formerly used by a defunct AMC Theatres cinema, and invited proposals from two developers, United Properties and Alpert Capital, to develop a multi-use tower project in the downtown core, adjacent to the recently built transit center. Such a project follows in the steps of similar multi-use developments such as Kent Station in nearby Kent. The city awarded the contract to United Properties' "Symphony" project, comprising four 15–22 story towers, including 60,000 square feet (5,600 m^{2}) of retail and office space, 900 housing units, and a large downtown park which would be relinquished to the city. Transfer of the land to United Properties followed by construction of the first tower was scheduled to start in mid-2008. However, in July 2008, United Properties requested a one-year extension on the terms of the purchase agreement, citing difficulties in the credit and housing markets to acquire the necessary funds. In August 2009, United suggested scrapping the Symphony plan and instead building a performing arts center on the property, a proposal the city rejected.

In September 2009 the South Korean development firm Lander Korus joined onto the project with United. Korus proposed adding Asian elements to the building in order to attract investment and interest from the city's influential Korean population and foreign investment. However, by July 2010, after having granted United and Korus five extensions to close on the project, the city transferred the deal to another Korean developer, Twin Development, which had planned a similar project on another lot. The new developer brought a new design, with two 45-story and one 35-story mixed-use towers. As of 2011 the new developers had yet to close on the property, citing financing difficulties, and had received the seventh extension on the land from the city, which expired in March 2011. The developers were banking on the city's recently granted EB-5 visa qualification to encourage foreign investment in exchange for permanent resident status. As of February 1, 2011, this deal was also dead, as the developer had failed to make a required escrow deposit by the end of January.

In 2011 the city renewed its Request for Quotes for the undeveloped site, and received three proposals. The city ultimately chose a proposal by Arcadd known as the "Crystal Palace", a densely packed glass multi-tower structure where some of the towers bend outward near the top under 20 stories with a larger retail and public space pavilion at the base. The developers, however, were unable to obtain the funds by the initial deadline. After extending the deadline eight months to allow Arcadd to obtain the necessary earnest money, and still seeing no progress, the city decided to move on with a different plan. As of May 2013, plans for a downtown park and plaza complex were underway. In 2014, the lot was repaved, leaving the AMC Theatres building foundation in place, but filling inside its perimeter with sod. The lot was rechristened Town Square Park and opened in early 2014. A plan for a more permanent park design on the site is being considered.

To the north of the downtown park, an elevated lot which was formerly the location of a Toys "R" Us store has been purchased by the city, which is slated to host a planned performing arts and civic center (PACC). The PACC proposal has been controversial, largely over funding and self-sustaining concerns (a similar city project, the Federal Way Community Center, opened in 2007 and ran for most of its operational history in the red), but has the support of most city leaders. It opened as the Performing Arts & Event Center (PAEC) in August 2017.

Also in 2014, ahead of Veterans Day, the city introduced a 60-foot (18 m) flagpole on South 320th Street between Pacific Highway South and Pete von Reichbauer Way South. The pole holds a 15-by-25-foot (4.6 by 7.6 m) flag. While intended to be officially raised on Veterans Day, a smaller flag was raised to half mast on the pole in late October, in memory of State Representative Roger Freeman who died October 29 of that year. The portion of South 320th Street from Pacific Highway to Interstate 5 was dual-named "Veterans Way" in honor of veterans.

== Demographics ==
Historical population
Census	Pop.	Note	%±
1990	67,554		—
2000	83,259		23.2%
2010	89,306		7.3%
2020	101,030		13.1%
2025 (est.)	99,729		−1.3%
U.S. Decennial Census; 2020 Census

As of the 2023 American Community Survey, there are 37,759 estimated households in Federal Way with an average of 2.71 persons per household. The city has a median household income of $81,997. Approximately 14.0% of the city's population lives at or below the poverty line. Federal Way has an estimated 63.0% employment rate, with 34.7% of the population holding a bachelor's degree or higher and 90.7% holding a high school diploma.

The top nine reported ancestries (people were allowed to report up to two ancestries, thus the figures will generally add to more than 100%) were German (7.7%), Subsaharan African (6.8%), English (6.2%), Irish (5.3%), French (except Basque) (2.7%), Italian (2.7%), Norwegian (2.4%), Scottish (1.2%), and Polish (0.7%).

=== Racial and ethnic composition ===
Federal Way, Washington – racial and ethnic composition Note: the US Census treats Hispanic/Latino as an ethnic category. This table excludes Latinos from the racial categories and assigns them to a separate category. Hispanics/Latinos may be of any race.
Race / ethnicity (NH = non-Hispanic)	Pop. 1990	Pop. 2000	Pop. 2010	Pop. 2020	% 1990	% 2000	% 2010	% 2020
White alone (NH)	57,339	55,050	46,102	38,897	84.88%	66.12%	51.62%	38.50%
Black or African American alone (NH)	2,643	6,439	8,406	14,177	3.91%	7.73%	9.41%	14.03%
Native American or Alaska Native alone (NH)	551	639	625	582	0.82%	0.77%	0.70%	0.58%
Asian alone (NH)	–	10,156	12,521	15,469	–	12.20%	14.02%	15.31%
Pacific Islander alone (NH)	–	840	2,331	4,031	–	1.01%	2.61%	3.99%
Other race alone (NH)	79	168	207	570	0.11%	0.20%	0.23%	0.56%
Mixed race or multiracial (NH)	–	3,701	4,638	7,038	–	4.45%	5.19%	6.97%
Hispanic or Latino (any race)	2,210	6,266	14,476	20,266	3.27%	7.53%	16.21%	20.06%
Total	67,554	83,259	89,306	101,030	100.00%	100.00%	100.00%	100.00%

=== 2020 census ===
As of the 2020 census, Federal Way had a population of 101,030, 36,140 households, and 24,280 families residing in the city. The median age was 36.9 years, 23.1% of residents were under the age of 18, and 14.5% were 65 years of age or older. For every 100 females there were 96.4 males, and for every 100 females age 18 and over there were 93.3 males age 18 and over.

Of all households, 32.4% had children under the age of 18 living with them, 44.6% were married-couple households, 19.2% were households with a male householder and no spouse or partner present, and 28.2% were households with a female householder and no spouse or partner present. About 24.5% of all households were made up of individuals and 9.4% had someone living alone who was 65 years of age or older.

The population density was 4,531.5 inhabitants per square mile (1,749.6/km^{2}). There were 37,677 housing units at an average density of 1,689.9 inhabitants per square mile (652.5/km^{2}). Of the housing units, 4.1% were vacant, with a homeowner vacancy rate of 0.8% and a rental vacancy rate of 4.5%.

99.9% of residents lived in urban areas, while 0.1% lived in rural areas.

Racial composition as of the 2020 census
Race	Number	Percent
White	41,438	41.0%
Black or African American	14,572	14.4%
American Indian and Alaska Native	1,167	1.2%
Asian	15,617	15.5%
Native Hawaiian and Other Pacific Islander	4,102	4.1%
Some other race	11,655	11.5%
Two or more races	12,479	12.4%
Hispanic or Latino (of any race)	20,266	20.1%

=== 2010 census ===
As of the 2010 census, there were 89,306 people, 33,188 households, and 22,026 families residing in the city. The population density was 4,011.9 inhabitants per square mile (1,549.0/km^{2}). There were 35,444 housing units at an average density of 1,592.3 per square mile (614.8/km^{2}). The racial makeup was 57.49% White, 9.75% African American, 0.94% Native American, 14.16% Asian, 2.69% Pacific Islander, 8.34% from some other races and 6.64% from two or more races. Hispanic or Latino people of any race were 16.21% of the population.

There were 33,188 households, of which 35.9% had children under the age of 18 living with them, 46.7% were married couples living together, 14.0% had a female householder with no husband present, 5.7% had a male householder with no wife present, and 33.6% were non-families. 26.3% of all households were made up of individuals, and 7.3% had someone living alone who was 65 years of age or older. The average household size was 2.67 and the average family size was 3.24.

The median age in the city was 34.9 years. 25.6% of residents were under the age of 18; 10.2% were between the ages of 18 and 24; 27.7% were from 25 to 44; 26.1% were from 45 to 64; and 10.3% were 65 years of age or older. The gender makeup of the city was 49.0% male and 51.0% female.

== Government ==
Federal Way has mayor–council form of government with a seven-member city council whose members are elected at-large to staggered four-year terms. The city initially had a council–manager government with an appointed city manager, but changed to the mayor–council system after a referendum in November 2009. Former councilmember Jim Ferrell was elected as mayor in 2013 and re-elected in 2017 and 2021.

== Media ==
One newspaper is published within Federal Way, the Federal Way Mirror. The city receives additional coverage from most major media sources in both Seattle and Tacoma.

== Infrastructure ==
=== Transportation ===
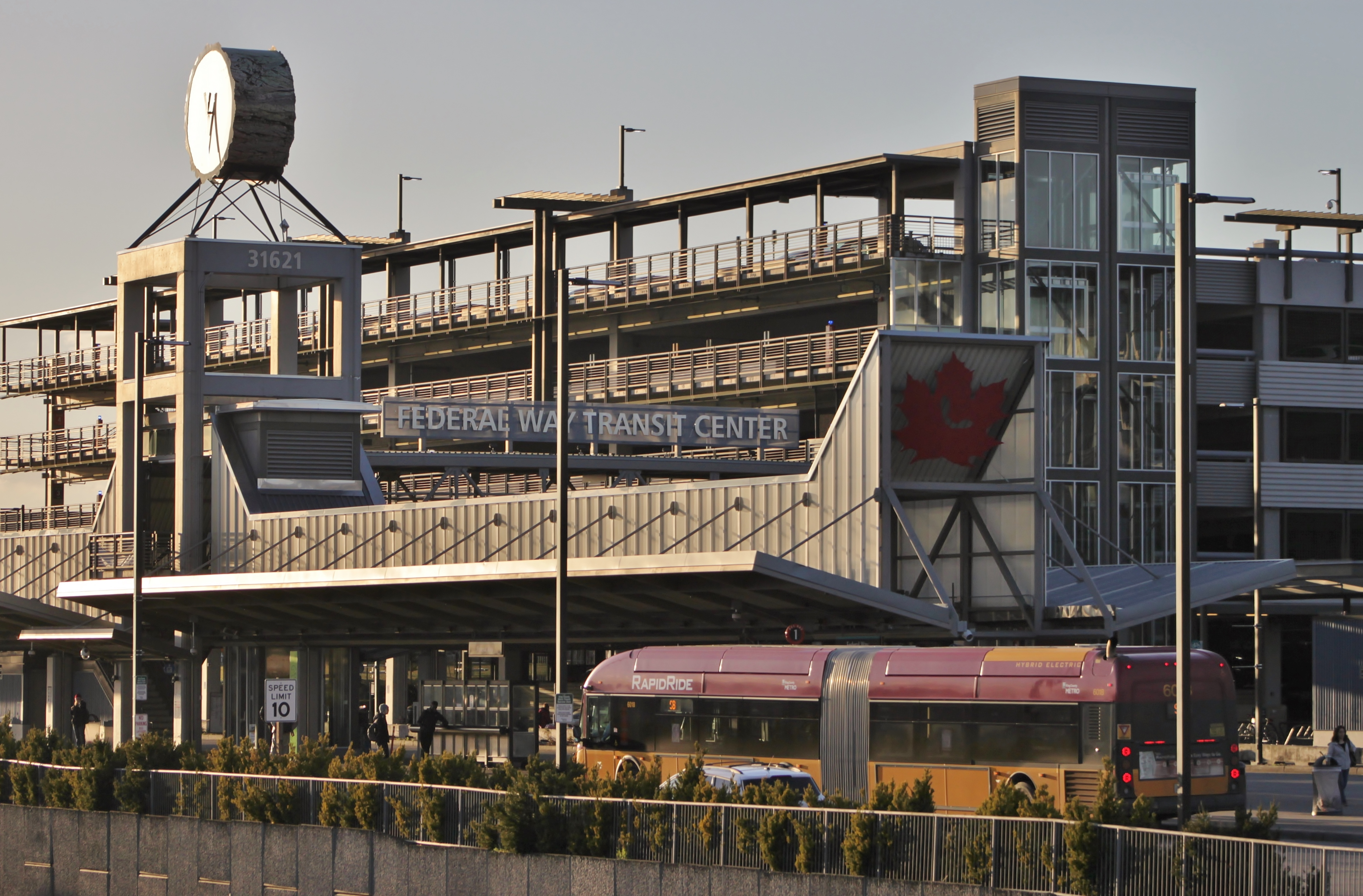
Federal Way Transit Center, pictured in 2017

Federal Way is served by Interstate 5 (I-5) via exits at 348th Street, 320th Street, and 272nd Street; and State Route 99 (SR 99), also known as the Pacific Highway.

The Federal Way Transit Center, located on 23rd Ave S, opened in 2006 and is served by King County Metro, Pierce Transit, and Sound Transit Express buses. It includes a parking garage and is the terminus of the RapidRide A Line. The bus station was moved to a new location in March 2025 as part of preparations for the opening of a new Link light rail station at the transit center, which was renamed to Federal Way Downtown station. The Federal Way Link Extension began construction in 2020 and opened in December 2025; it extended light rail service south from the existing terminus at Angle Lake station in SeaTac.

== Notable people ==
- Tony Barnette, professional baseball player
- Mario Batali, chef and television personality
- Shaun Bodiford, professional American football player
- Kendall Burks, professional soccer player
- J. R. Celski, speed skater and Olympic medalist
- Hank Conger, professional baseball player
- Sylvia Day, novelist
- Michael Dickerson, professional basketball player
- Hassani Dotson, professional soccer player
- C. J. Elleby, professional basketball player
- Bob Ferguson, American football executive
- Benson Henderson, mixed martial artist
- Travis Ishikawa, professional baseball player
- Reggie Jones, professional American football player
- Andre Jordan Jr, American football cornerback for the Auburn Tigers
- Janson Junk, professional baseball player
- Sam Kim, singer-songwriter and guitarist
- Floyd Little, professional American football player
- Sanjaya Malakar, singer and American Idol contestant
- Jaden McDaniels, professional basketball player
- Jalen McDaniels, professional basketball player
- John Moe, author and radio personality
- Lamar Neagle, professional soccer player
- Dustin Nickerson, stand-up comedian
- Ciaran O'Brien, professional soccer player and coach
- Apolo Ohno, speed skater and Olympic medalist
- Sean Okoli, professional soccer player
- Mike Pellicciotti, Washington State Treasurer
- Bill Radke, radio host
- Kelyn Rowe, professional soccer player
- Kyle Secor, actor
- Dan Spillner, professional baseball player
- Corinne Stoddard, speed skater and Olympic medalist
- James Sun, entrepreneur and contestant on The Apprentice
- Roy Thomas, professional baseball player
- Iam Tongi, singer
- Frank Warnke, state politician

== Sister cities ==
Federal Way has the following sister cities:

- Donghae, Gangwon Province, South Korea
- Hachinohe, Aomori Prefecture, Japan
- Rivne, Rivne Oblast, Ukraine
