= Rhododendron Species Foundation and Botanical Garden =

Nonprofit botanical garden in Federal Way, Washington

Coordinates: 47.2928°N 122.3023°W

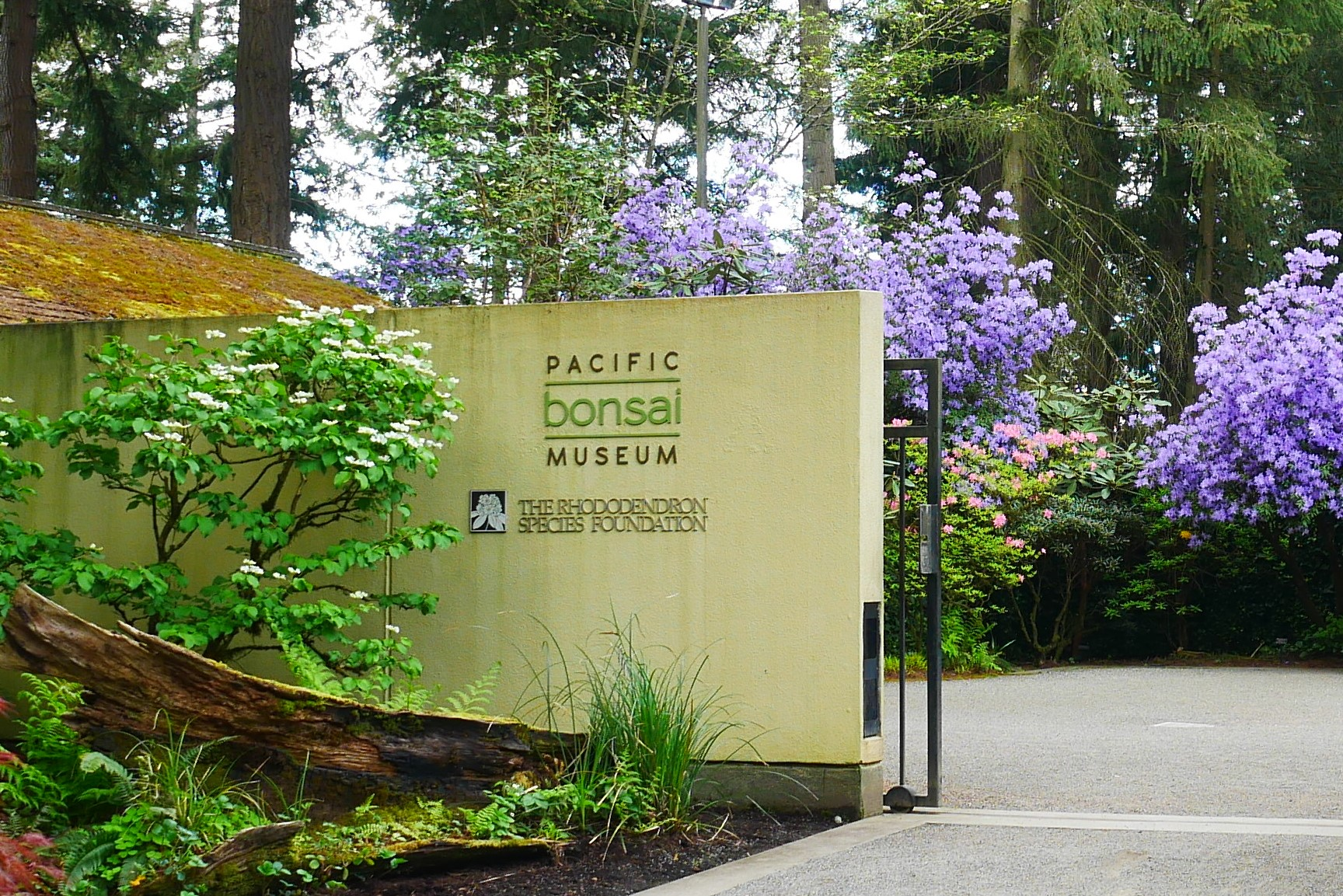
- Entrance to park and museum.
- Interactive map of Rhododendron Species Foundation and Botanical Garden
- Type: Botanical garden
- Location: Federal Way, King County, Washington
- Area: 22 - 24 acres
- Created: 1974
- Operator: The Rhododendron Species Foundation
- Designation: non-profit
- Website: rhodygarden.org

The Rhododendron Species Foundation and Botanical Garden (RSBG) on 22–24 acres is a nonprofit botanical garden specializing in rhododendrons in Federal Way, Washington. As of 2006 the Foundation's mission is devoted to the conservation, research, acquisition, evaluation, cultivation, public display, and distribution of rhododendron species. The gardens contain over 10,000 rhododendrons, set out as a woodland garden among native conifers. It is adjacent to the Pacific Bonsai Museum.

== History ==
The organization was founded in 1964 by members of the American Rhododendron Society (ARS) after a visit to Britain by Dr. Milton Walker of Oregon. Walker was interested in importing cuttings from the best rhododendron plants in the wild as well as from public and private gardens. He learned that he could not import cuttings directly from Europe due to American regulations, but Canada allowed such imports.

Walker asked Mary Grieg, the owner of the Royston Nursery on Vancouver Island in British Columbia, to propagate imported cuttings for him. She made an arrangement with the University of British Columbia to facilitate the process. Evelyn Jack, working with the University, grew the plants for two years and, by agreement, kept one plant for the University and sent the other to Oregon for the Society.

The Society kept the plants on Walker's property near Eugene, Oregon until 1971 when they were moved to a Board member's home near Salem, Oregon. By 1974, after outgrowing several other sites, the collection was moved to its current location in Washington state. It was provided by Weyerhaeuser Company corporate headquarters at no cost to the Society.

In 1976 membership and volunteer programs were developed. The garden was replanted to group species most closely related to each other. In 1980 the garden opened to the public on a limited basis.

== Exhibits ==
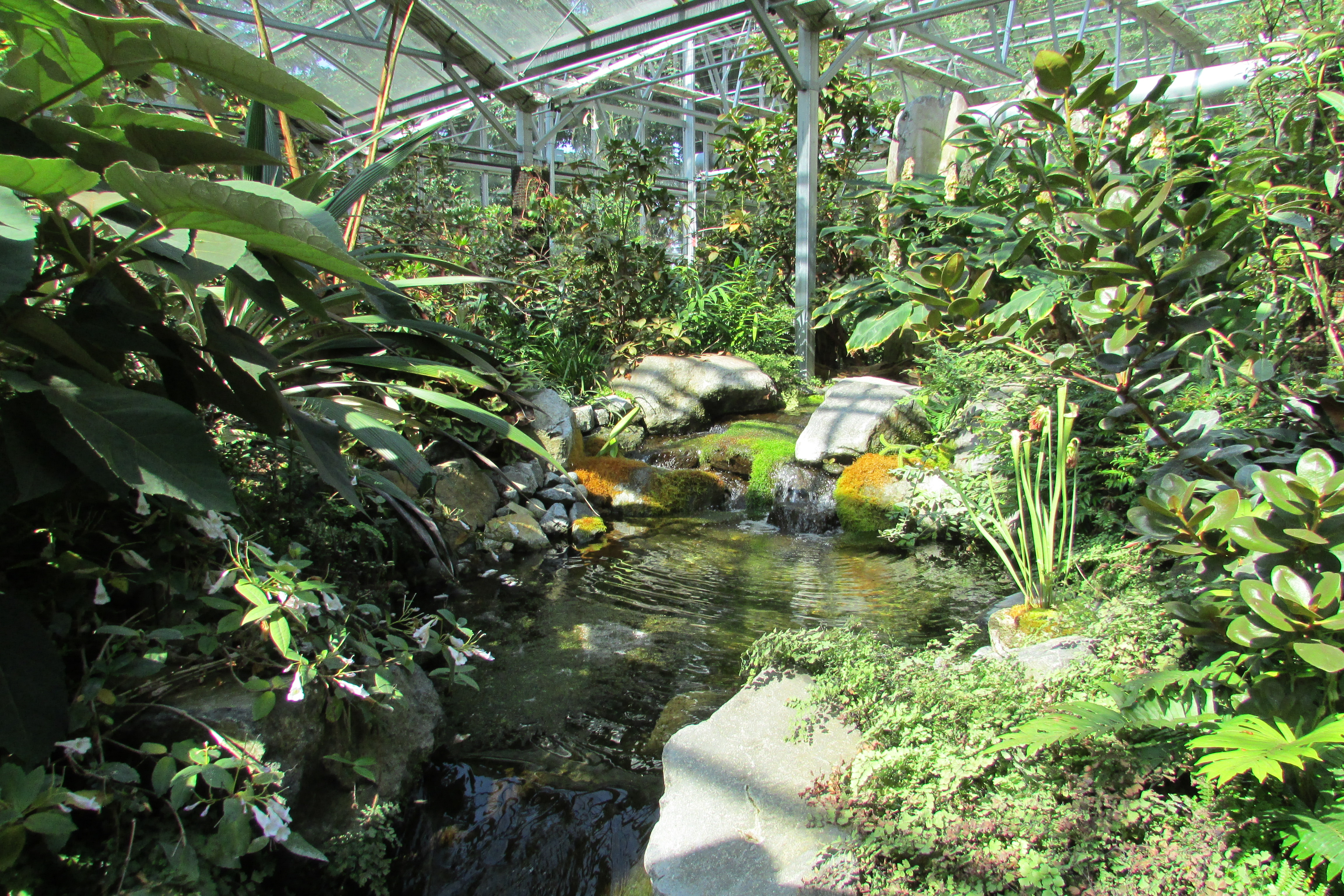
Tropical plants inside the conservatory.

In 2010 the RSBG opened the 5,000-square-foot Rutherford Conservatory, a climate-controlled greenhouse open to the public that displays a collection of tropical rhododendrons known as vireyas. The vireya section, which has about 319 species, is found almost entirely in Indonesia, Sumatra, Borneo, the Philippine Islands, Malaysia, Thailand and New Guinea. Some of the vireyas on display in the Rutherford Conservatory are nearing extinction in their native habitat due to forest degradation. In addition, other rare plants such as wild orchid species and tree ferns are displayed, all growing together as one would see them in their native habitats that span oceans and continents. The conservatory is named for RSBG volunteer Francis C. Rutherford.

Additional areas in the Garden include the Victorian Stumpery, Himalayan Blue Poppy Meadow, Alpine Rockery Garden and Pond Garden. The Garden Gift Shop and Nursery are located within the Garden. It is open to the public daily, except Mondays.

As of 2011, the garden had over 10,000 rhododendron plants. Over 700 species from every continent were represented in the garden. By 2019, the garden had become home to 850 of the 1,100 different rhododendron species that presently existed in the world.

In 2019 the Weyerhaeuser Company was sold to Industrial Realty Group (IRG) and planned to develop the Woodbridge Corporate Park. RSBG told the Federal Way Mirror that it was negotiating a new lease and had no plans to go anywhere. The owners of IRG said they are committed to working with RSBG and "have an excellent working relationship" with them.

This is the best collection of rhododendron species on the planet.

— Steve Hootman

== Research and education ==
In 2015 a RSBG sponsored tour of India led by Executive Director & Curator Steve Hootman were trapped for two days by a Himalayan landslide. They were able to escape by footpath led by the local police and military. While on the expedition they "recorded about 20 different species of rhododendron in the area, including a newly discovered species".

Scientists from Holden Arboretum in Kirtland, Ohio visited RSBG in 2015 to take samples to investigate physiological diversity among Rhododendron species. They spent a week collecting roots, wood, seeds and cuttings which would take them over a year to analyze.

== People ==
One of the founding members of the society Lawrence Pierce and his wife Isabel Colman Pierce received a gold medal from the American Rhododendron Society. The Royal Botanic Garden Edinburgh named a rhododendron species piercei for him. The Edinburgh Society named a rhododendron hybrid Isabel Piece after Isabel Colman Piece.

In 2007 the American Rhododendron Society awarded the gold medal to co-director Steve Hootman for his work in conservation and education, calling him one of the "foremost international plant hunters of the late 20th and early 21st centuries ... and among the most knowledgeable people in the world on the genus Rhododendron".

== Gallery ==
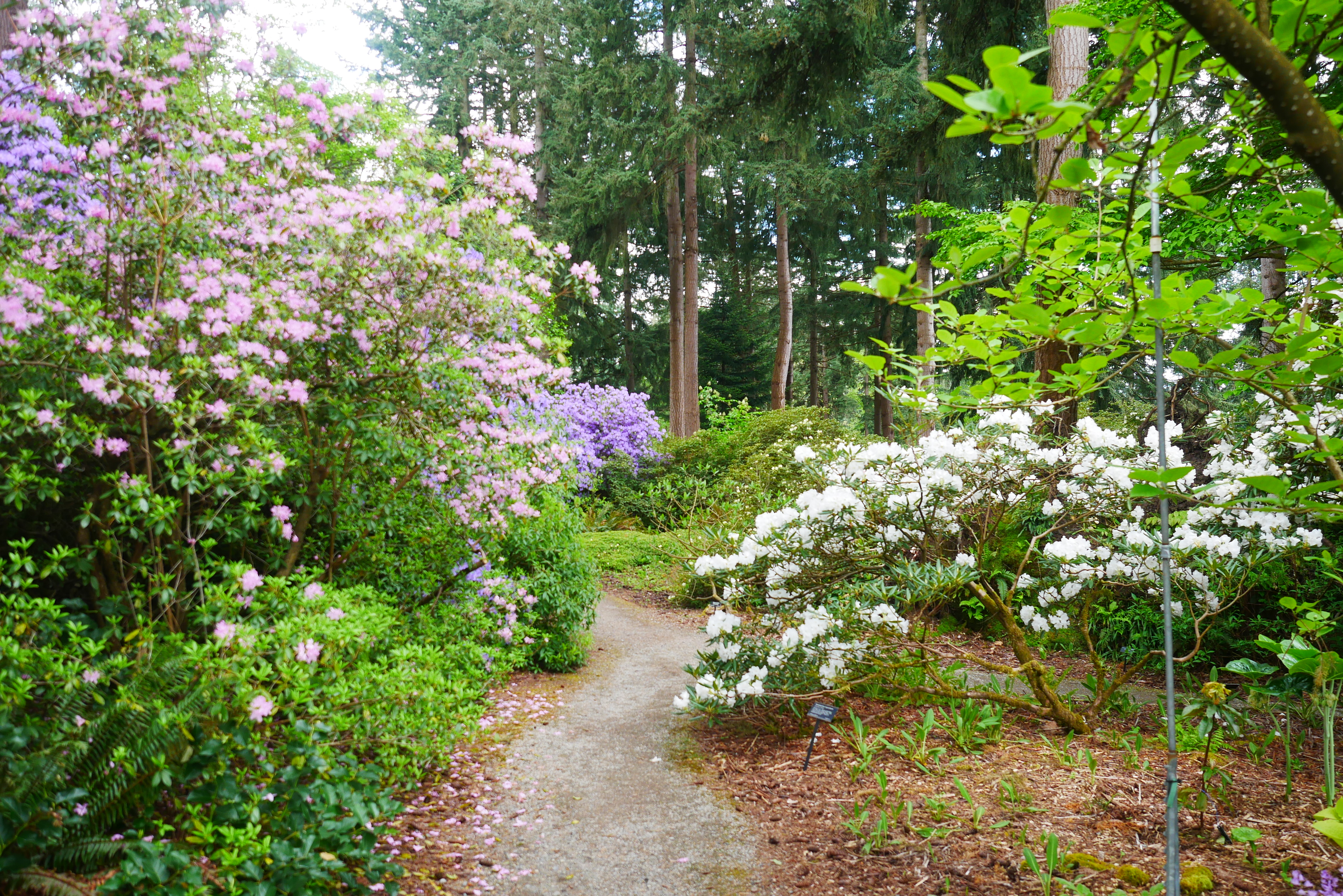

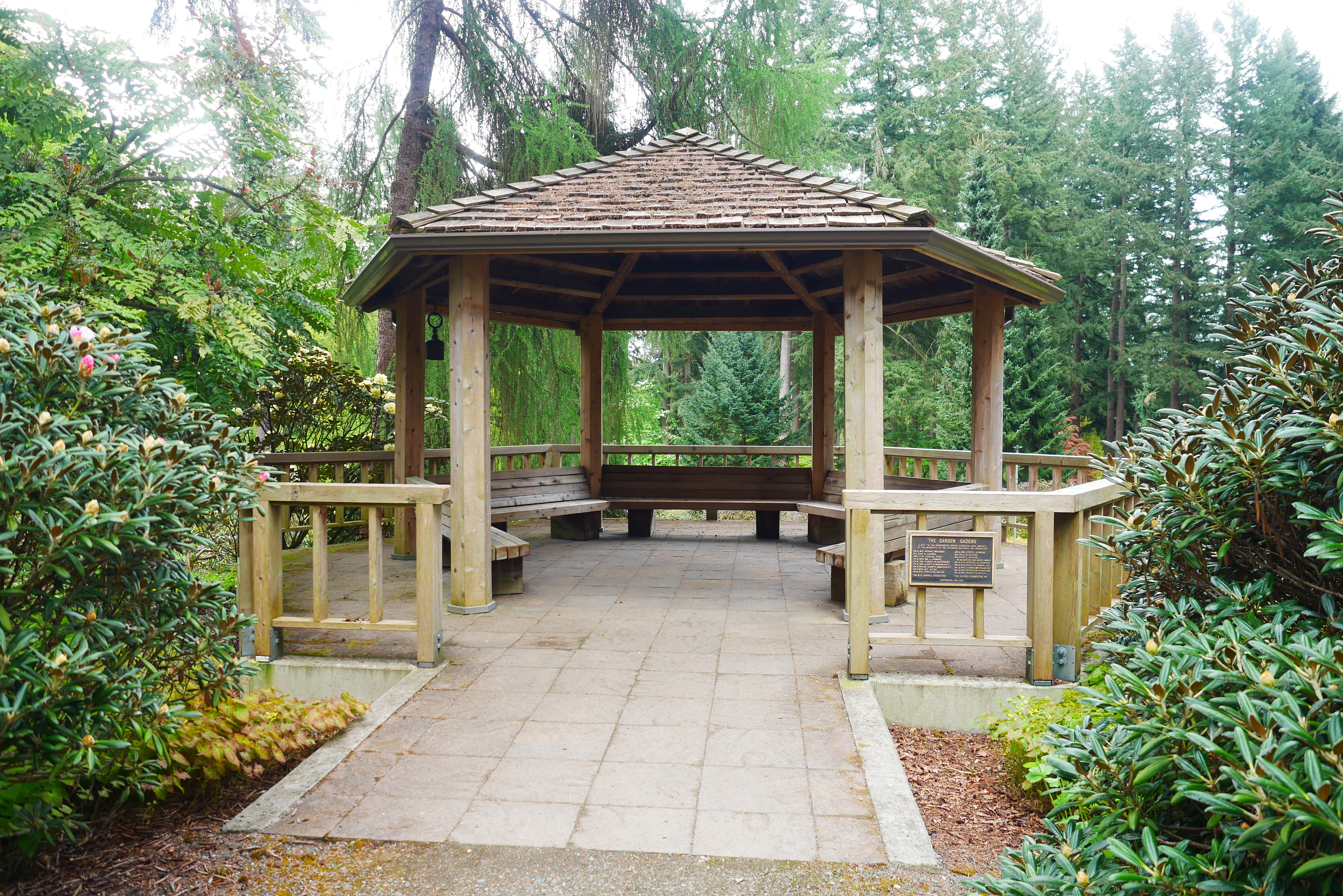

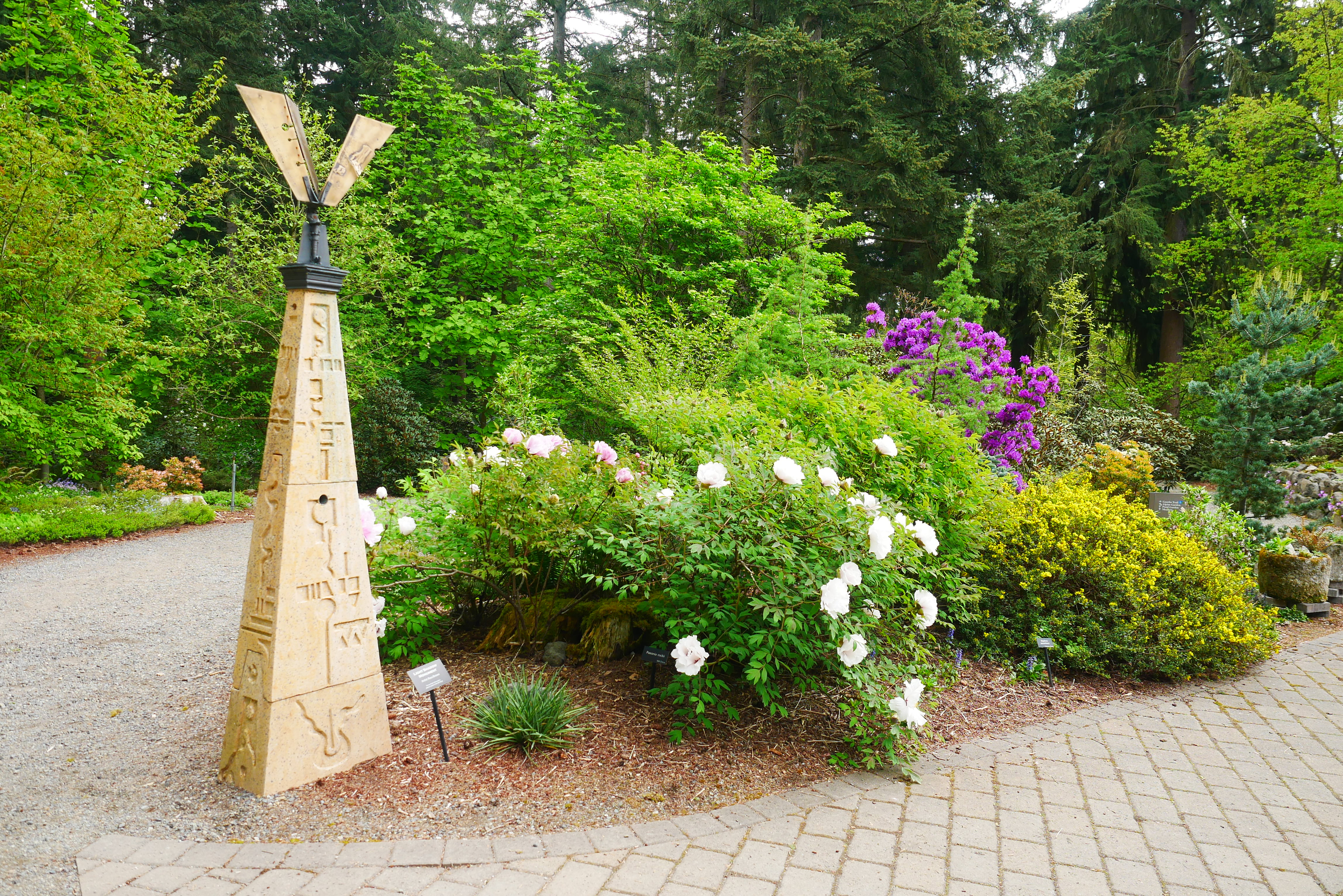
Light Shadow Monument artist Ross Brown

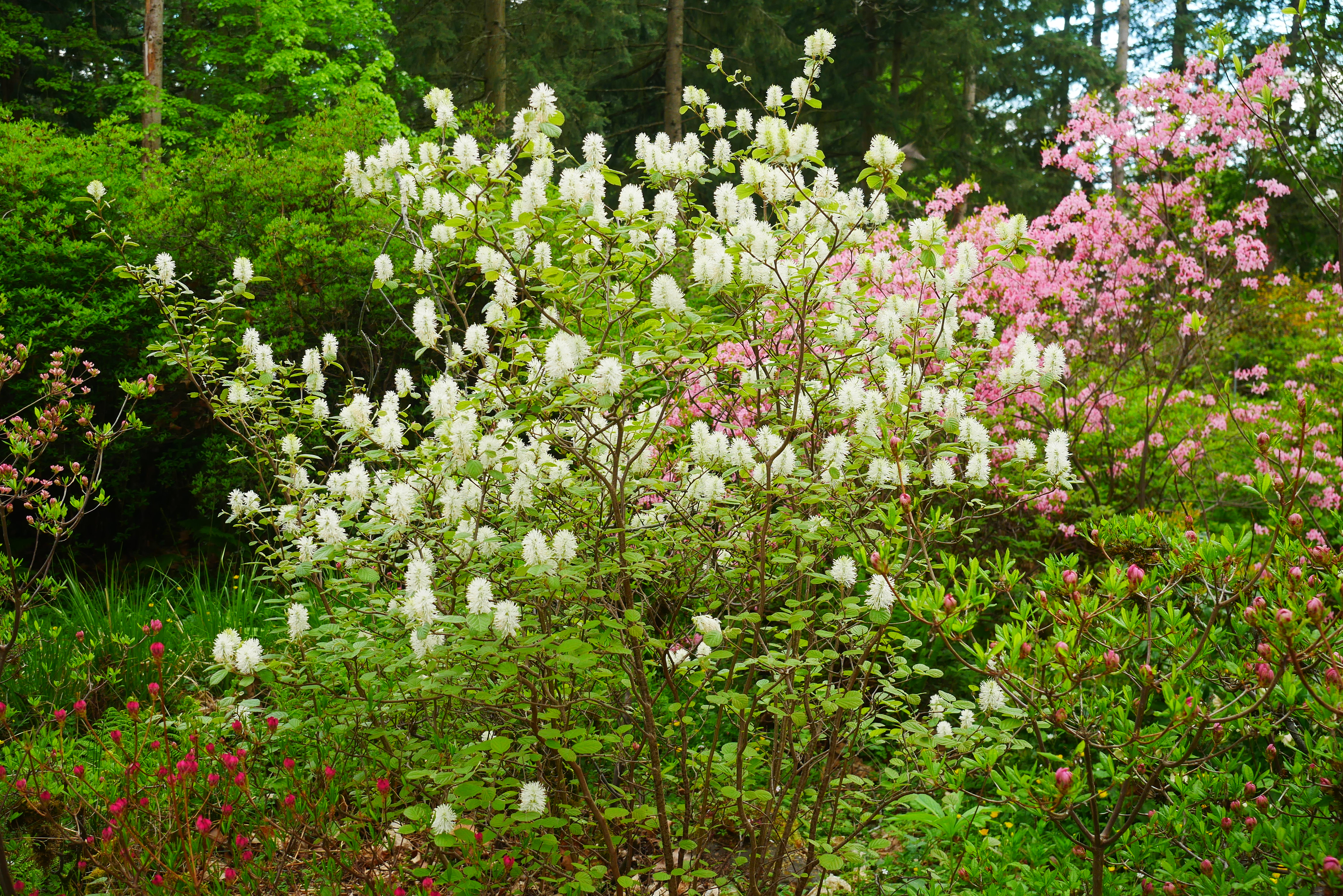

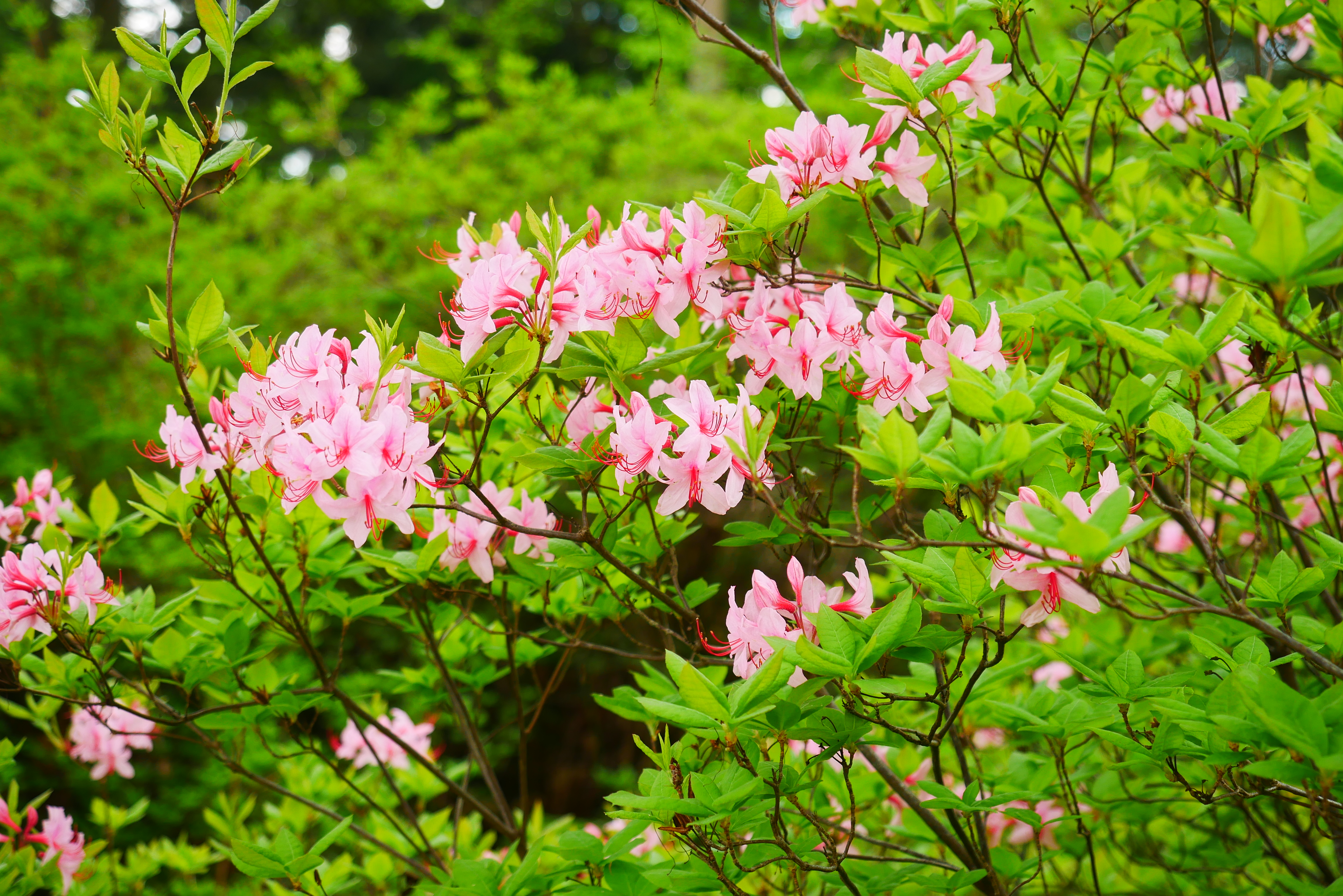
Roseshell Azelea R rinophyllum bush

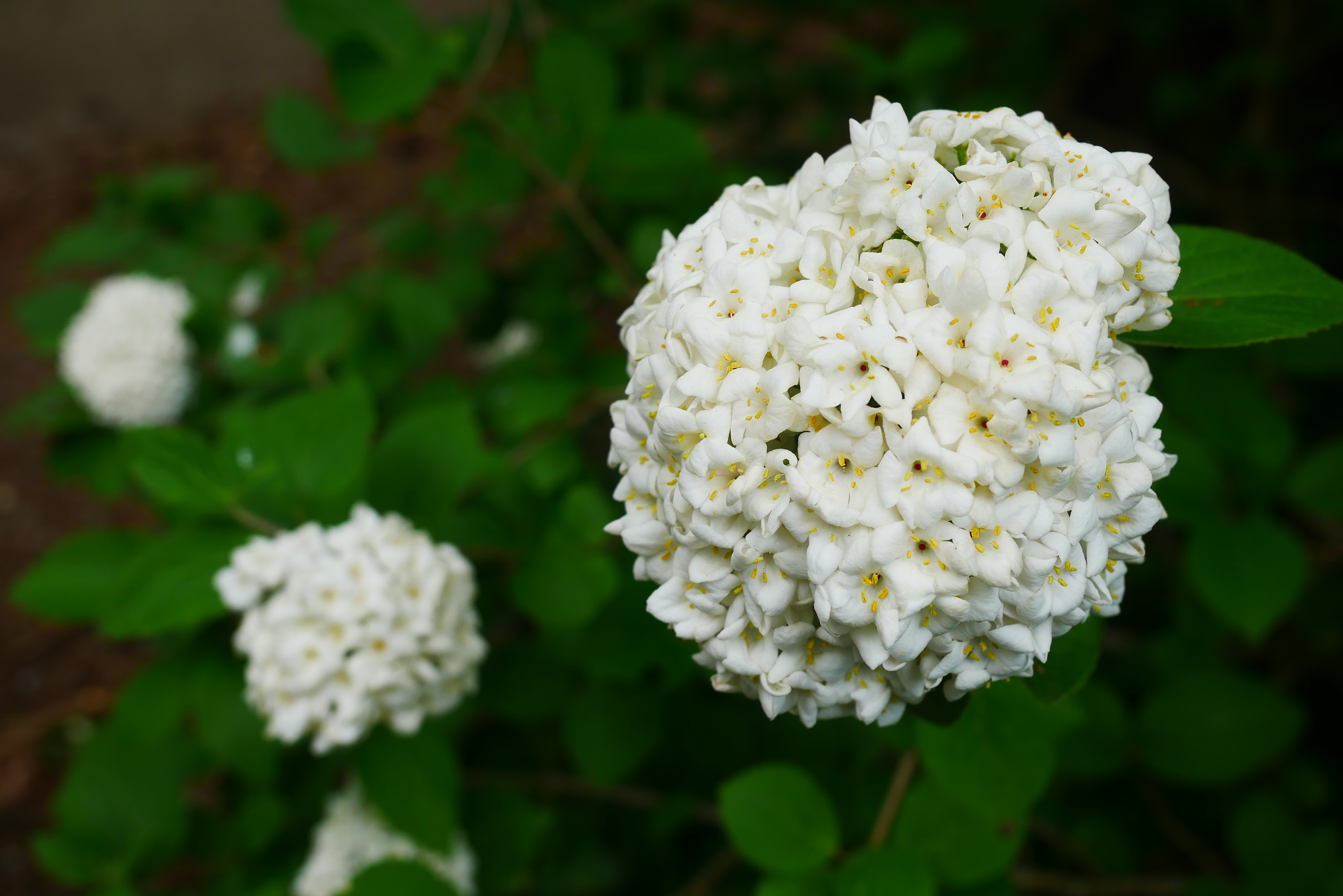
Viburnum carlesii from Korea and Japan blossoms

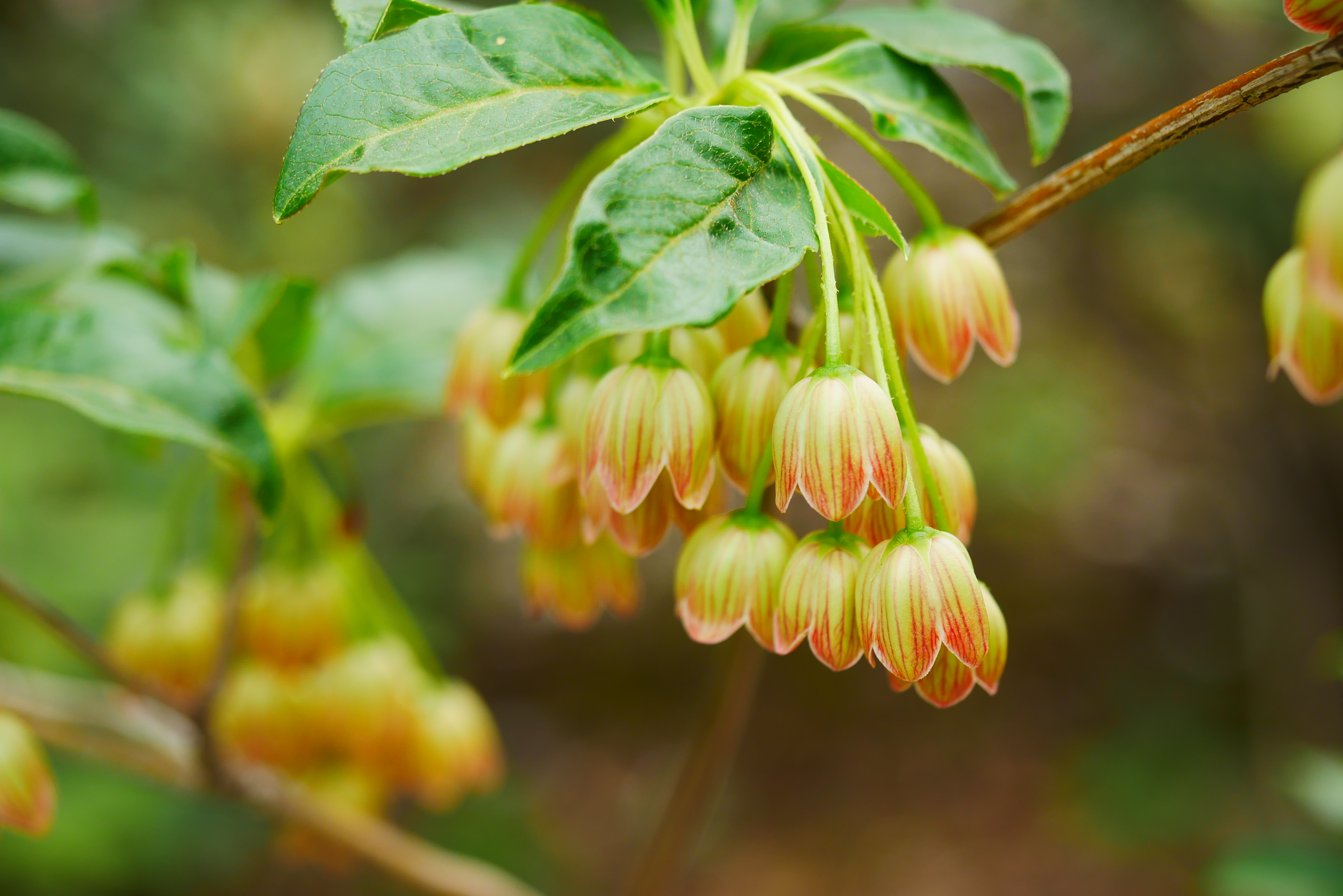
Enkianthus deflexus bunch.

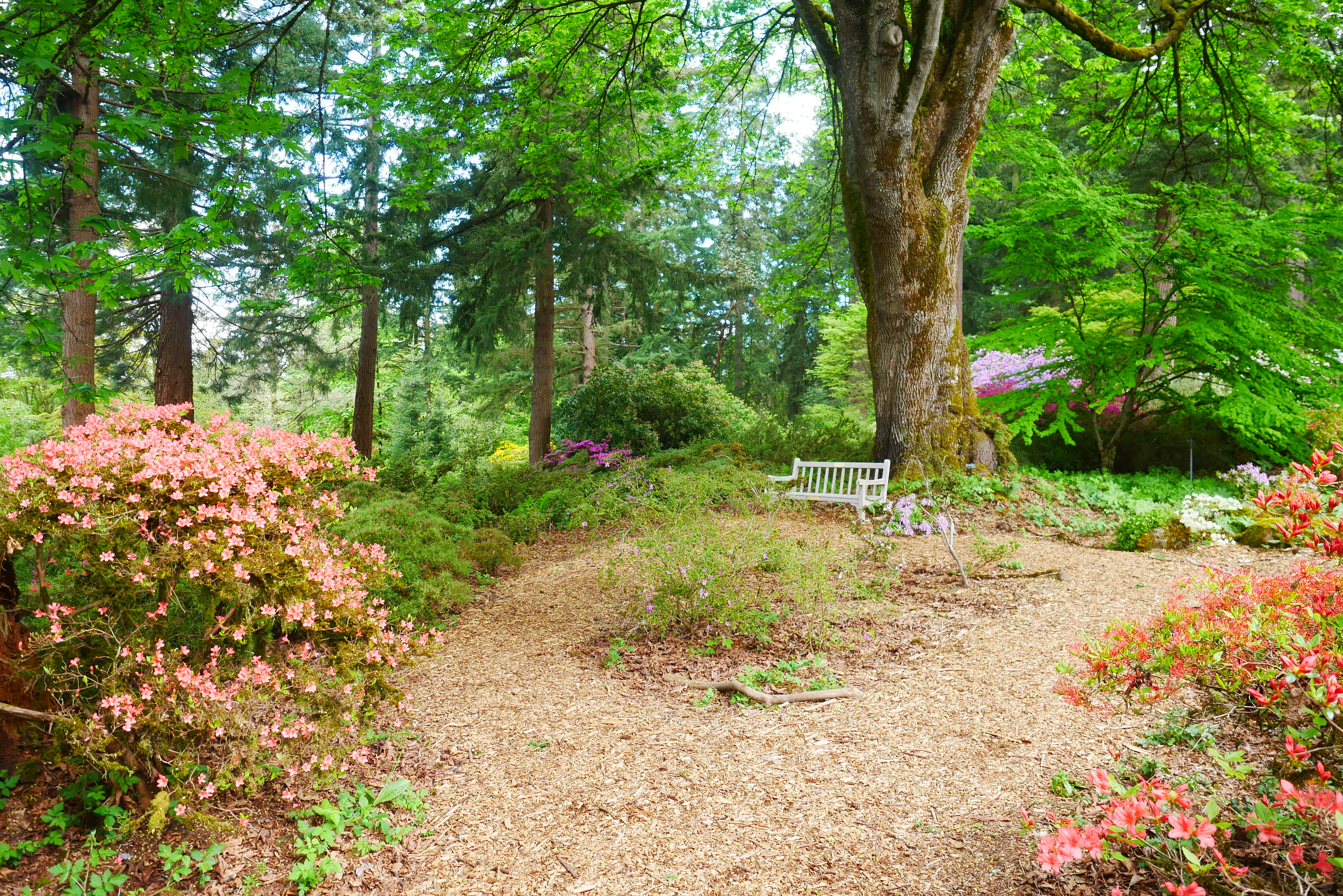

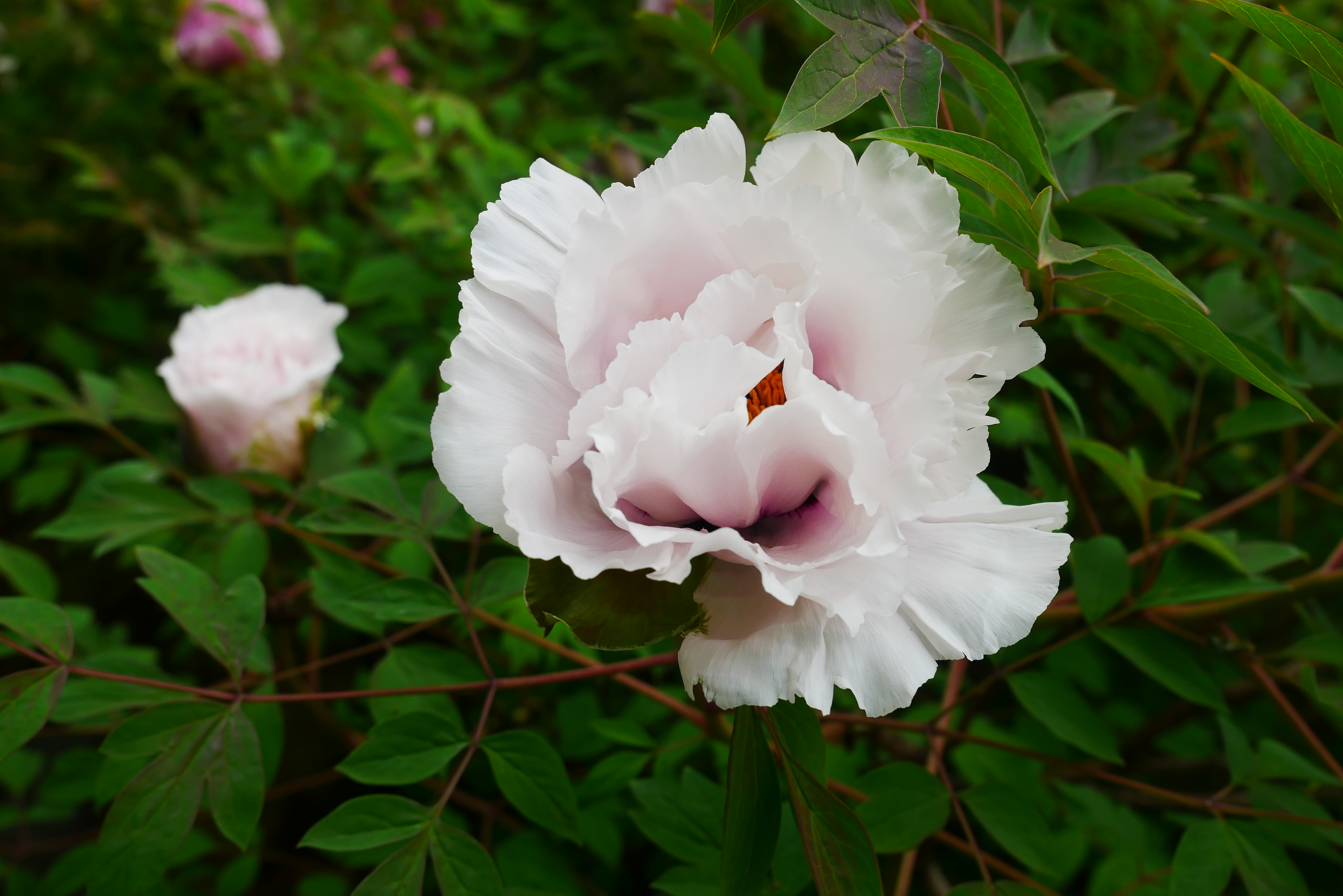
Paeonia Rockii bloomed with bud

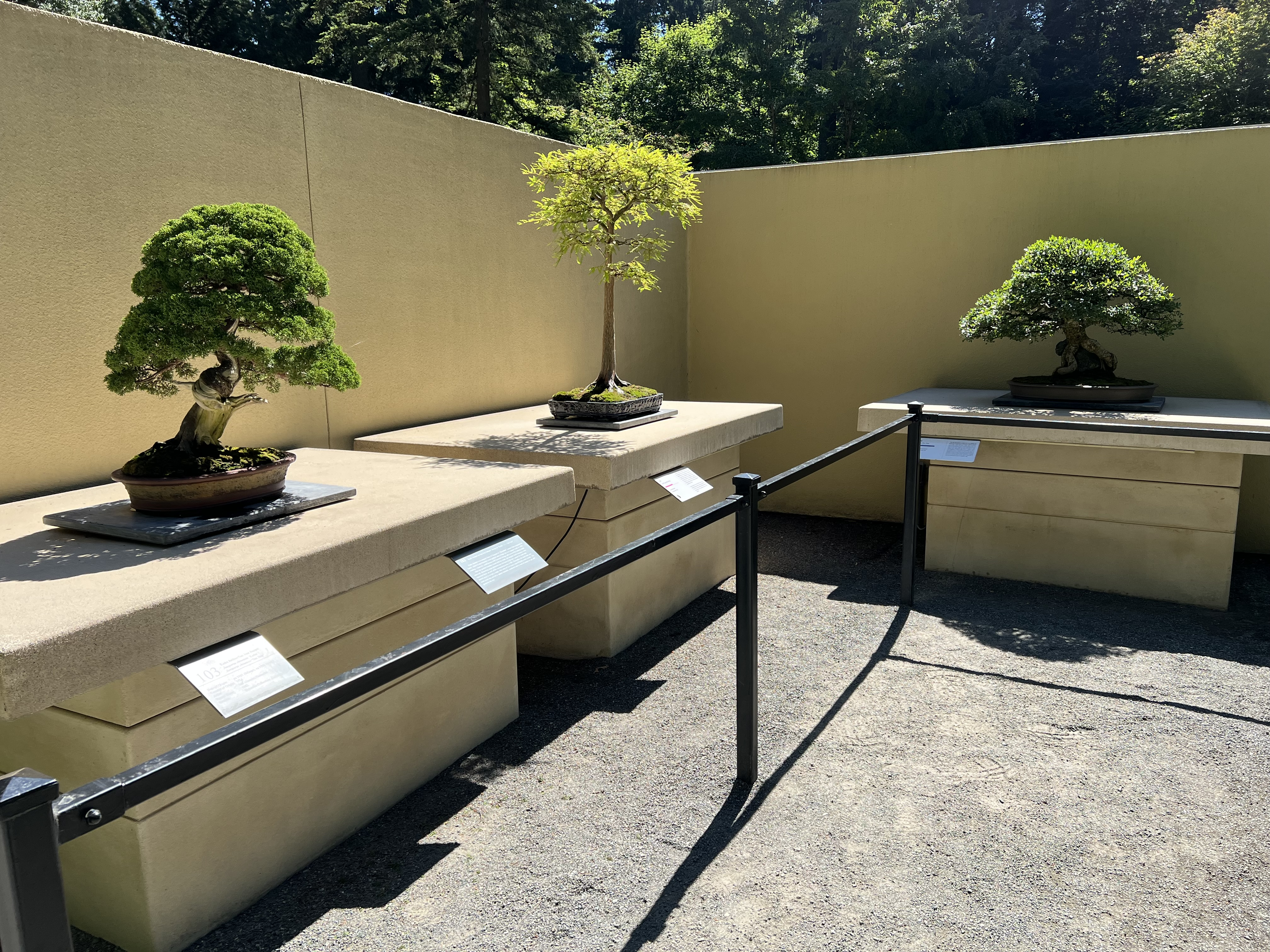
Pacific Bonsai Museum

== See also ==
- List of botanical gardens in the United States
- North American Plant Collections Consortium
