= Transportation in Seattle =

Cars and electric trolleybusses share Rainier Avenue with Mt Rainier in the background

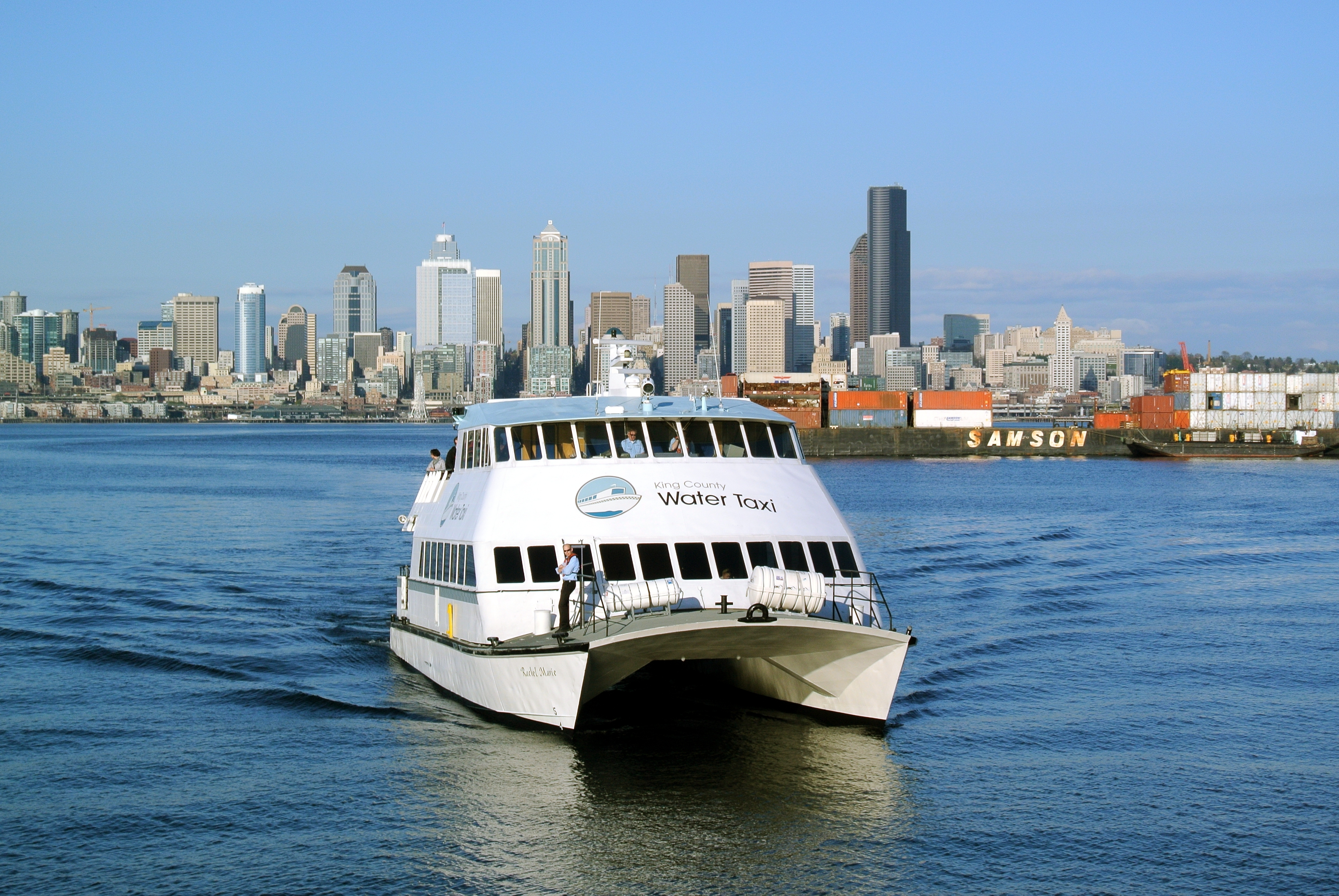
King County Water Taxi and downtown Seattle

Transportation in Seattle is largely focused on the automobile like many other cities in western North America; however, the city is just old enough for its layout to reflect the age when railways and trolleys predominated. These older modes of transportation were made for a relatively well-defined downtown area and strong neighborhoods at the end of several former streetcar lines, now mostly bus lines.

Due to Seattle's isthmus-like geography and the concentration of jobs within the city, much of the flow of transportation in the metropolitan area is through the city proper. North-south transportation is highly dependent on the Interstate 5 corridor, which connects the Puget Sound area with southwest Washington cities and the Portland metropolitan area, as well as cities to the north such as Bellingham and Vancouver, Canada. I-5 continues as British Columbia Highway 99 at the U.S.-Canada border's Peace Arch crossing, between Blaine and Surrey. State Route 99 is also a major arterial in the western half of the city; it included the now-defunct Alaskan Way Viaduct along the Seattle waterfront. The Alaskan Way Viaduct replacement tunnel was opened in place of the elevated viaduct in February 2019 on account of seismic instability.

Transportation to and from the east is via State Route 520's Evergreen Point Floating Bridge and Interstate 90's Lacey V. Murrow Memorial Bridge and Third Lake Washington Bridge, all over Lake Washington. Those bridges are respectively the first, second, and fifth longest floating bridges in the world. State Route 522 connects Seattle to its northeastern suburbs.

Two public transportation agencies are based in Seattle: King County Metro, which operates local and commuter buses within King County, and Sound Transit, which operates commuter rail, light rail, and regional express buses within the greater Puget Sound region. In recent years, as Seattle's population and employment have surged, transit has played an increasingly important role in transportation within the metro area. By 2017, nearly 50% of commuters to downtown Seattle arrived via mass transit.

Washington State Ferries, the largest ferry system in the United States and the second largest in the world, operates a passenger-only ferry from Colman Dock in Downtown to Vashon Island, car ferries from Colman Dock to Bainbridge Island and to Bremerton, and a car ferry from West Seattle to Vashon Island to Southworth. Seattle was once home to the Kalakala, a streamlined art deco-style ferry that sailed from the 1930s to the 1960s.

Seattle contains most of Boeing Field, officially named King County International Airport; but most airline passengers use Seattle-Tacoma International Airport in the city of SeaTac. Seattle is also served by three Amtrak routes from the King Street Station: the Cascades, Coast Starlight, and Empire Builder lines.

== History ==
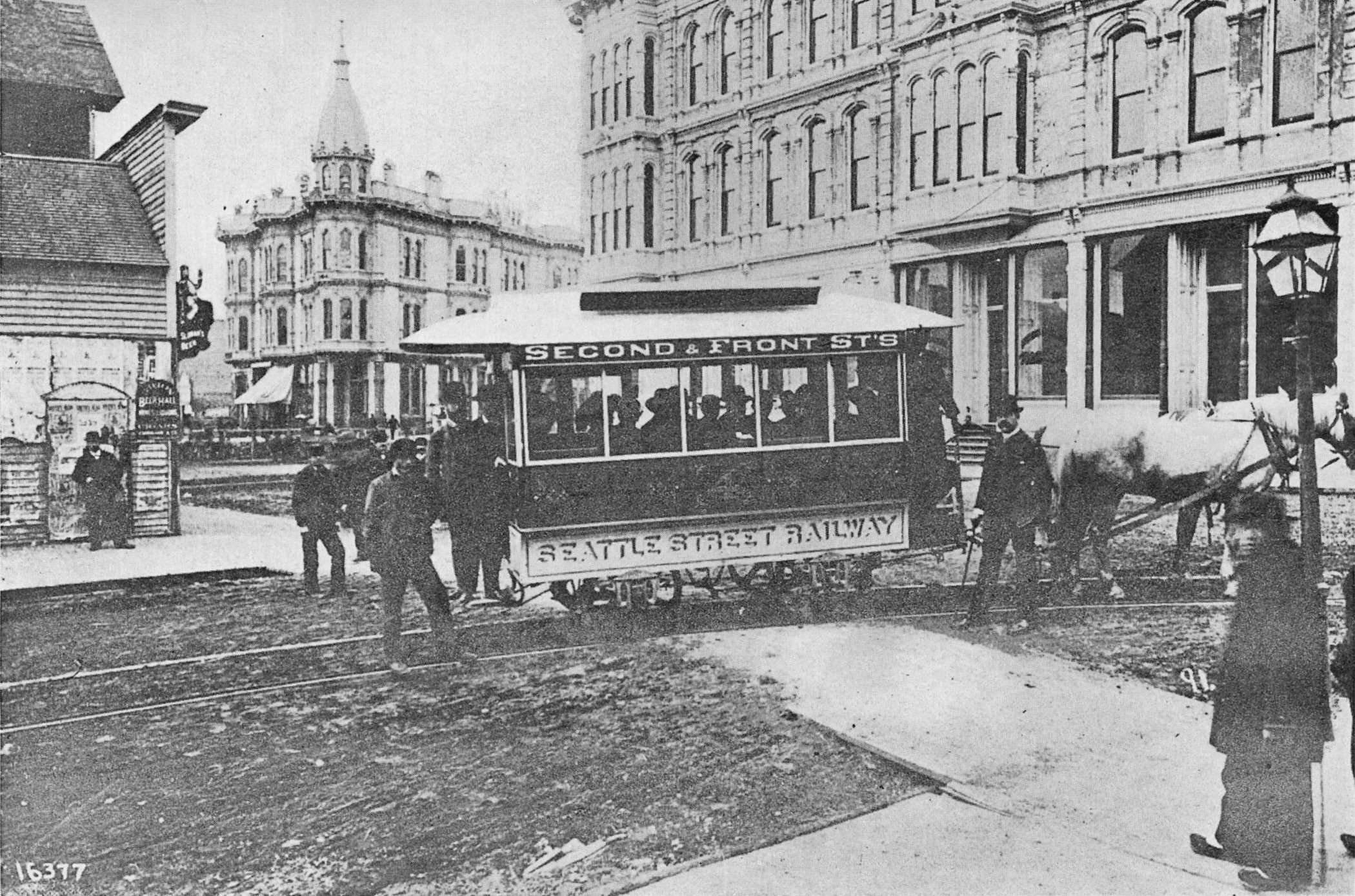
Horse-drawn streetcar at what is now the corner of Occidental and Yesler, 1884

Even though Seattle is old enough that railways and streetcars once dominated its transportation system, the city is now largely dominated by automobiles but has recently started rebuilding streetcar lines and light rail routes. Seattle is also serviced by an extensive network of bus routes and two commuter rail routes connecting it to many of its suburbs.

Organized land transportation in Seattle dates back at least to 1871; by that date, a wagon traveled twice daily from what is now First Avenue (near Elliott Bay) to Lake Washington; the fare was 50 cents, no small sum for that era. In 1880 a two-horse carriage carried passengers and freight from roughly today's Pioneer Square to Belltown every two hours at a fare of 12.5 cents in an open coach or 15 cents in a covered coach. This was shortly followed by similar services connecting out to Lake Union and Madison Park on Lake Washington.

Water transport was important even within what are now city limits. A steamer connected South Lake Union to Latona (between today's Lower Wallingford and the University District) and another steamer crossed Green Lake.

The first street railway, Seattle Street Railway, came in 1884, with horse-drawn cars plying 3.5 miles (5.6 km) of track up today's Second Avenue to Pine Street, then up First Avenue to Battery Street. Yesler Way and Jackson Street got their cable cars (from Pioneer Square to Lake Washington) in 1888, allowing public transportation on routes over hills too steep for horses. Electric streetcars appeared in 1889, making Seattle one of the first cities in the United States to adopt this innovation.

The Great Seattle Fire did not slow this progress at all: by 1890, there were lines along the waterfront from South Seattle (today's South Park) to Lower Queen Anne and from the center of town to Capitol Hill, Madison Park, and Madrona. These were instrumental in the creation of a relatively well-defined downtown and strong neighborhoods at the end of their lines.

At the turn of the century, the streets were so bad that a boy named Joseph Bufonchio drowned in a sink-hole at the corner of Third and Jackson. As Gordon Newell noted in 1956, contemporary reports did not seem to consider this particularly unusual.

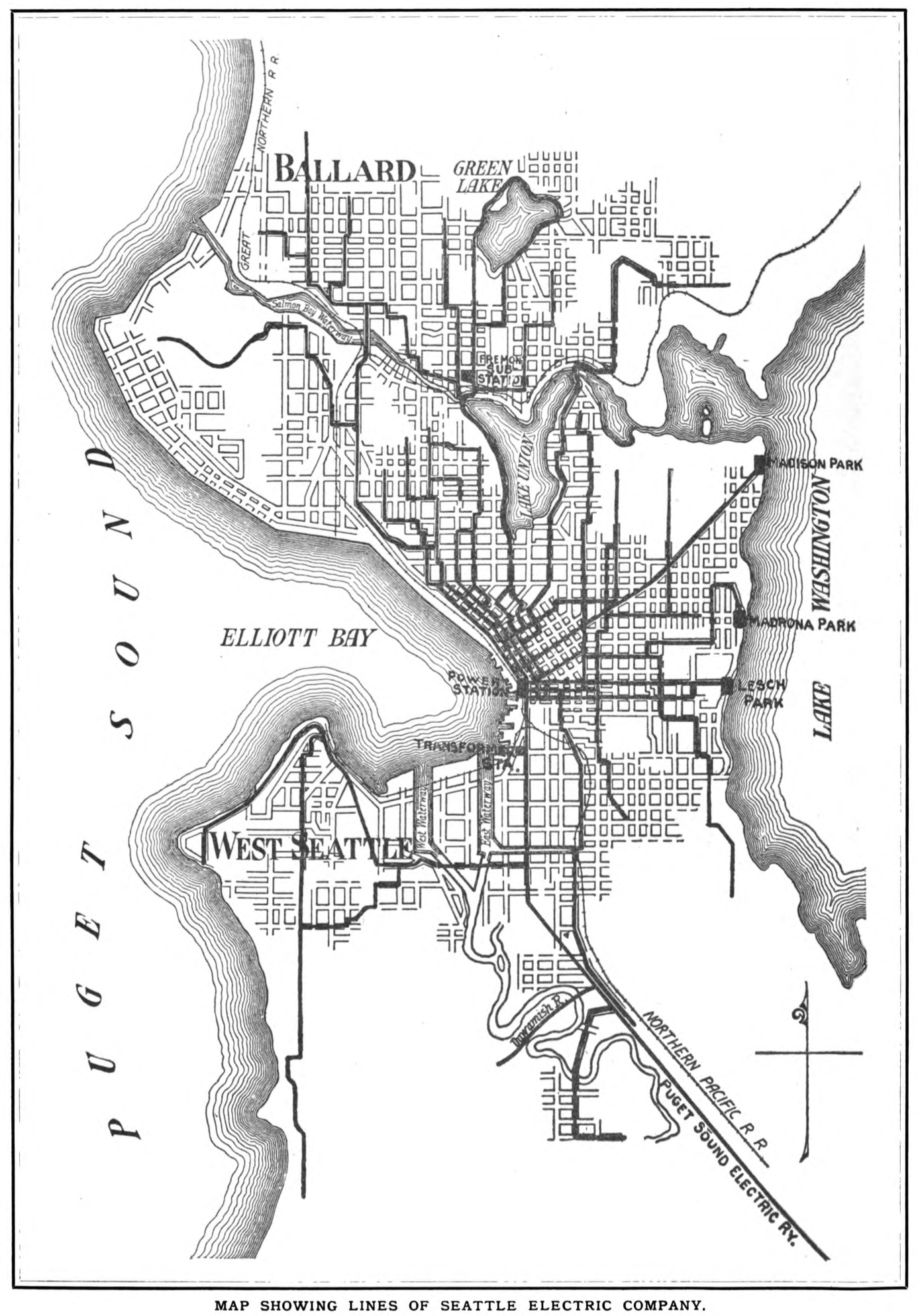
Map Showing Lines of Seattle Electric Company c 1907

At that time, there were about 25 independent transit lines in Seattle. By 1907, the Seattle Electric Company, owned by Boston-based Stone & Webster, leveraged its foothold in the electric power industry to consolidate these into one operation, known after 1912 as the Puget Sound Traction, Light and Power Company. It cost a nickel to ride. Puget Sound Traction was bought out by the city in 1919 for US$15 million. However, under the city's management, the streetcars chronically ran a loss (even after a 1923 fare increase to three rides for a quarter, a fare of 8-and-a-third cents), and the quality of the system deteriorated.

The advent of the automobile sounded the death knell for rail in Seattle. Tacoma–Seattle railway service ended in 1929 and the Everett–Seattle service came to an end in 1939, replaced by automobiles running on the recently developed highway system. When the city received a US$10.2 million federal grant to pay off transit-related debts and modernize its transit system, rails on city streets were paved over or removed, and the opening in 1940 of the Seattle trolleybus system brought the end of streetcar service in Seattle in the early hours of April 12, 1941. This left an extensive network of buses (including 188 miles (303 km) of trolleybus lines) under an independent Municipal Transportation Commission as the only mass transit within the city and throughout the region.

The new transit system was jammed and profitable during the gasoline and rubber rationing of World War II, but the automobile reigned supreme after the war. Fares rose to 10 cents, the first of many increases that would lead to a present-day regular adult fare of $2.75. Various proposals to expand mass transit were rejected in the 1950s and '60s. In 1972, voters approved the establishment of Metro Transit to run bus lines in King County. A further expansion was approved in 1996, following yet another defeat in 1995.

== Streets, roads, and automobiles ==
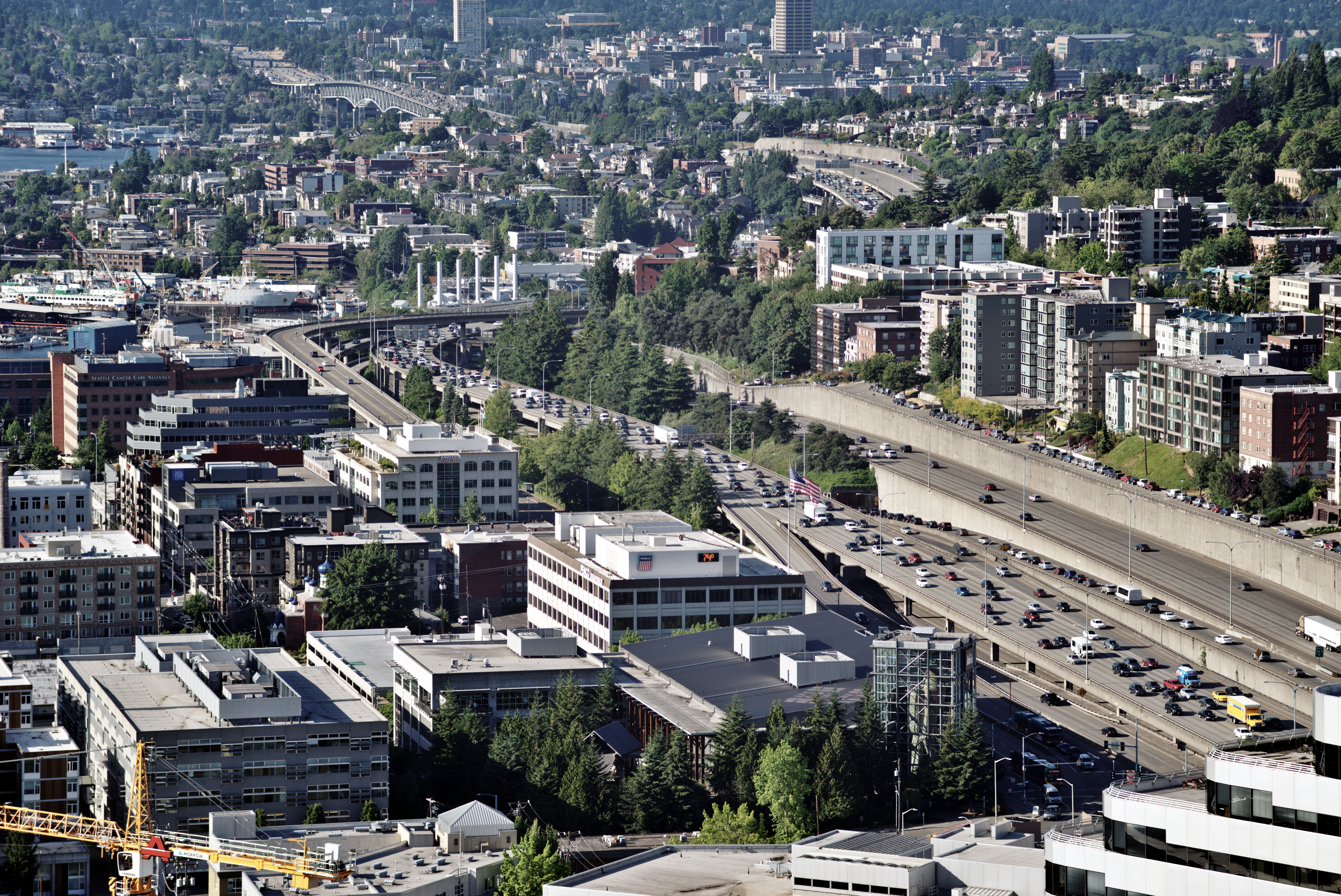
Interstate 5 highway passing through Seattle. A large volume of southbound traffic is visible during rush hour.

Seattle set its first speed limit in the 1880s, in the days of horse-drawn vehicles. At that time, traffic in the Pioneer Square neighborhood was limited to 6 miles per hour (10 km/h).

The city is described in a mid-20th-century civics textbook as "a city of islands—islands created both by water and by abrupt valleys that can be traversed only by bridges." Already by 1948, 221,500 vehicles a day crossed the city's bridges across the Lake Washington Ship Canal and Duwamish River; except for the high Aurora Bridge (officially George Washington Memorial Bridge) across the Ship Canal, these were all drawbridges. This was before the construction of the Interstate Highways or State Route 520; the original Lake Washington Floating Bridge (opened 1940) provided the only road out of town to the east; construction of the Alaskan Way Viaduct, the first limited-access highway through the city center, was still underway.

Even with the lesser population of that time and fewer major highways, difficulty parking downtown had already become "practically an institution". The total number of vehicles parking downtown in a day would already have filled a parking lot the size of downtown had they all been there at once; naturally, many of these were there only briefly for shopping. Parking meters had been introduced in the early 1940s, and multi-level parking garages provided some relief (and would later provide more), but the impact of the automobile on the city was very apparent. The city was considering various proposals, such as the establishment of large parking lots on the periphery of downtown with shuttle buses into the center. The city was seeking (and failing to get) state permission to use the right of eminent domain to acquire property for multi-level parking lots. Later, in the mid-1960s, the historic Seattle Hotel building was torn down for just this purpose; the reaction against that sparked the preservationist movement for the revival of Pioneer Square and made it clear that the city would not solve its problem by demolishing a ring around downtown.

Over 15,000 Seattleites are members of the car sharing program Zipcar (formerly Flexcar). While not all members are frequent users, as of September 2004 the use of these shared cars has been substantial enough to justify the purchase of over 150 cars and other light vehicles for the program, with an additional vehicle purchased approximately every ten days. Two other car-sharing services, Car2Go and ReachNow, formerly operated within Seattle.

The city maintains over 2,300 miles (3,700 km) of sidewalks that cover approximately 27 percent of streets in Seattle. Large areas of the city's annexed suburban neighborhoods, including north of North 85th Street and south of Interstate 90, lack sidewalks. As of 2024, 13,500 blocks lack sidewalks. Funding for sidewalks remains an issue, as a result, the city has prioritized safe routes to school and has used lower-cost asphalt walkways and traffic calming where needed.

=== SR 99 Tunnel ===
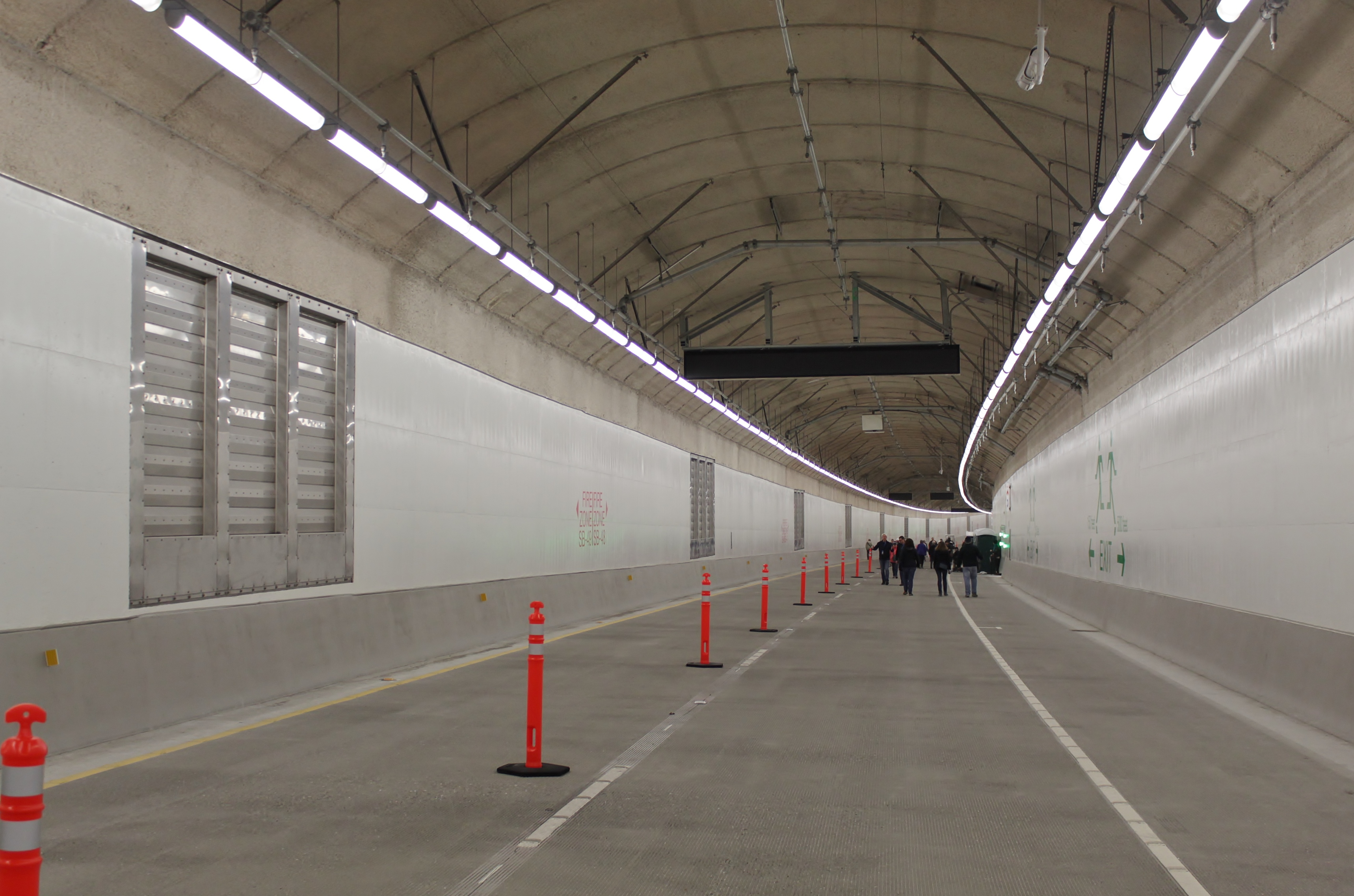
Upper (southbound) deck of the SR 99 Tunnel

The SR 99 Tunnel is a 2-mile (3.2 km) bored double-decker highway tunnel carrying a section of State Route 99 (SR 99) under Downtown Seattle from SoDo in the south to South Lake Union in the north.

Since the 2001 Nisqually earthquake, the replacement of the Alaskan Way Viaduct has been the source of much political controversy demonstrating the Seattle process. Options for replacing the viaduct, which carried 110,000 vehicles per day, included either replacing it with a cut-and-cover tunnel, replacing it with another elevated highway, or eliminating it while modifying other surface streets and public transportation. The current plan emerged in 2009 when government officials agreed to a deep-bore tunnel.

Construction began in July 2013 using "Bertha", at the time the world's largest-diameter tunnel boring machine. After several delays, tunnel boring was completed in April 2017, and the tunnel opened to traffic on February 4, 2019.

The now-demolished SR-99 Alaskan Way Viaduct

The new Alaskan Way with planters, bike lanes and wide pedestrian crossings

=== Freeways in the metropolitan region ===
There are 21 different freeways and highways that make up the Seattle freeway system. They are: Interstate 5, Interstate 405, Interstate 90, Interstate 705, US 2, SR 3, SR 16, SR 18, the Alaskan Way Viaduct/SR 99, SR 167, SR 303/Waaga Way, SR 410, SR 509, SR 512, SR 518, SR 520, SR 525, SR 526, SR 599, the Port of Seattle owned Airport Expressway, and the City of Seattle owned West Seattle Freeway. Interstate 5 is the major north–south route through the region. Interstate 5 is four or five lanes for most of its way through the metro area. The freeway connects the metro area to California, Oregon, and British Columbia.

The freeway system uses ramp meters to help keep traffic moving. WSDOT uses variable message signs to let travelers know if there is an accident, to tell drivers how long their drive will be to certain areas, and for Amber alerts. Recently, WSDOT installed variable speed signs along SR 520 and I-90 between I-5 and I-405, and along I-5 between the West Seattle Freeway and SR 520. There are also HOV lanes to move buses and carpools faster on many freeways and arterials. The HOV lanes on I-405 allow general purpose traffic to use them after 7pm (till about 5am), and the lanes on SR 167 are actually HOT lanes (carpools may use the lanes free; solo drivers can use the lanes for a variable fee). There are 225 lane miles of HOV lanes built and another 100 unbuilt. Freeway improvements are paid for by two gas taxes, 2003 Gas Tax and 2005 Gas Tax.

==== Interstate 5 ====
This is Seattle's largest and widest freeway. Traffic back-ups going into Seattle from the north and south are very common during the morning and evening rush hours.

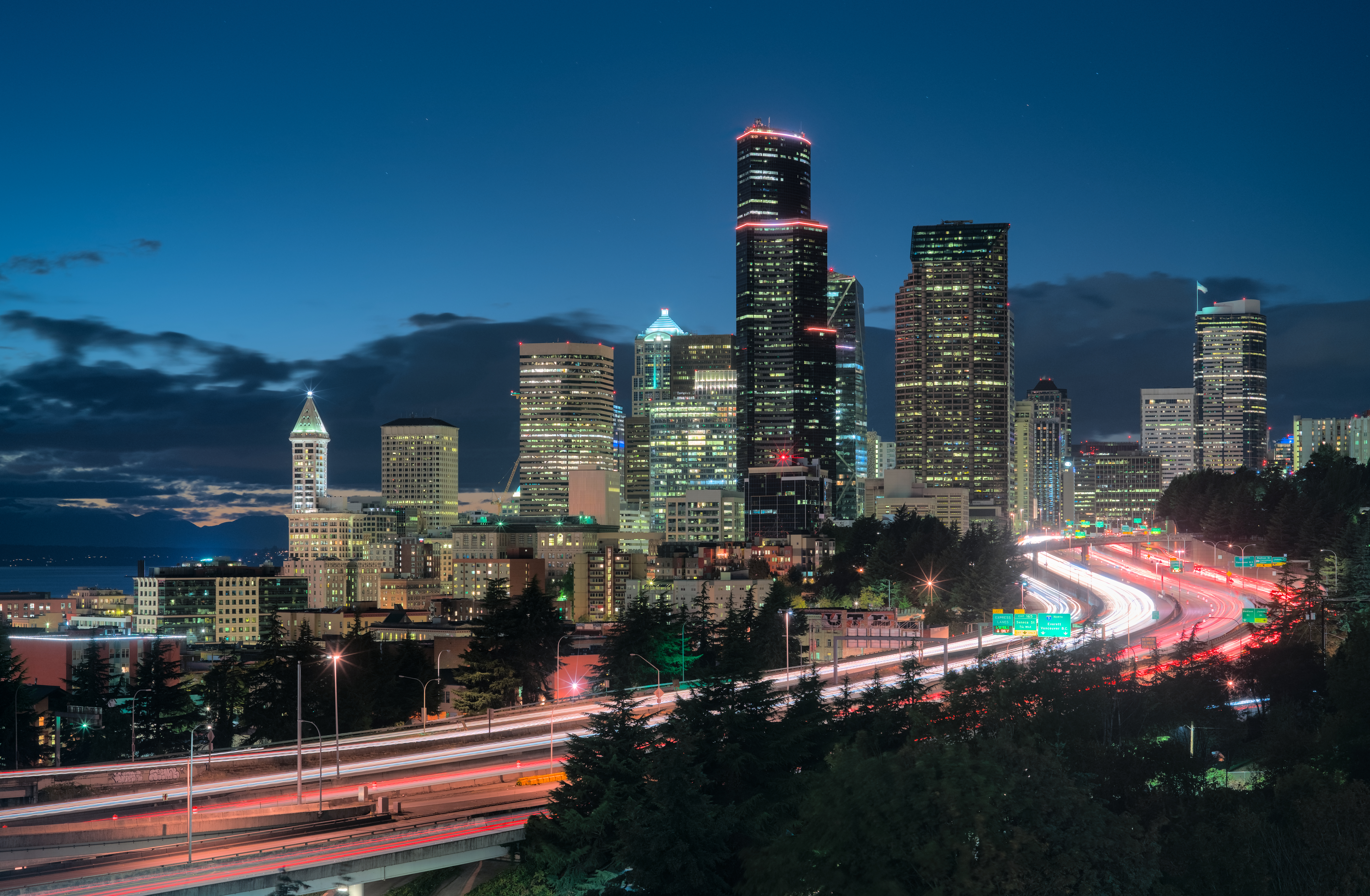
Interstate 5 in Downtown Seattle, seen from Beacon Hill

Interstate 5 runs just east of Downtown Tacoma as it goes through the metro area. After going through Federal Way and the west side of Kent it passes by a major shopping mall, Southcenter in Tukwila, where it connects with the south terminus of Interstate 405. Then the freeway continues and passes by SeaTac International Airport in the inner southern suburbs of Seattle and passes very close to Boeing Field (also known as King County International Airport). As the freeway heads towards Downtown Seattle, reversible lanes, or express lanes, branch off the mainline and continue north through the city. The express lanes carry southbound traffic in the morning and northbound traffic in the afternoon. The Express Lanes merge with the main line in the Northgate area of North Seattle. After that, I-5 continues north through the cities of Shoreline, Mountlake Terrace, and Lynnwood. In Lynnwood it merges with Interstate 405 again. It continues north to the last large city in Seattle Metro area, Everett. It was built in South Tacoma between 1955 and 1957, North Tacoma to Kent between 1959 and 1961, between Kent and downtown Seattle in 1966, from downtown Seattle to Roanoke Street in 1964, from Roanoke Street to Lake City Way/SR 522 in 1960, and north of there to Everett in 1964.

==== Interstate 90 ====
The floating Homer M. Hadley Memorial Bridge carrying cars and trains

Interstate 90 goes east out of Seattle, eventually terminating in Boston. The freeway was originally built in 1940 from Rainier Avenue to Issaquah. It passes through the Eastside's largest city, Bellevue, and skirts the north side of Factoria Mall in Bellevue, where it interchanges with the north–south Interstate 405. Then the freeway continues east and passes through Issaquah, Snoqualmie, and North Bend before climbing into the Cascade Mountains. The freeway originally consisted of four lanes, and crossed the Lacey V. Murrow Floating Bridge. In the early 1950s, an interchange was built at Rainier Avenue and the highway extended 1 mile closer to Seattle's city centre along "Corwin Place". In the early 1960s, traffic congestion forced the Department of Highways to institute a tidal flow system, in which three lanes, controlled by overhead signals went into Seattle in the morning, and toward Bellevue in the afternoon. In 1968, improvements to the east of Mercer Island were made; the highway was widened to up to 6 lanes in each direction and the interchange with I-405 was upgraded from a cloverleaf to a fully directional interchange. Litigation kept the 7-mile section between Bellevue and Interstate 5 from being upgraded until the 1980s, at which time a new bridge from the Eastside to Mercer Island was built and the dangerous "bulge" was removed from the Lacey V. Murrow Floating Bridge. In 1990, the renovations/widening of the freeway were completed, including the new Homer M. Hadley Memorial Bridge over Lake Washington to carry westbound traffic and the HOV/reversible lanes, or express lanes, from Bellevue to Seattle, with general-purpose traffic allowed to use the reversible lanes in between Mercer Island and Seattle. The express lanes carry westbound traffic in the morning and eastbound traffic in the afternoon. Further improvements are now being made to put HOV lanes in both outer roadways to ready the center roadway for Sound Transit's Link light rail.

==== Interstate 405 ====
Interstate 405 begins in Tukwila at I-5, SR 518, and Westfield Southcenter, and continues east through Renton and then turns north and runs through Bellevue, Kirkland, and Bothell, before turning northwest and crossing I-5 in Lynnwood (near Alderwood Mall), where it becomes SR 525, a freeway for its first few miles. I-405 was built in stages between 1955 and 1968, with a major upgrade north of Bellevue to Bothell in 1972. HOV lanes were added in the 1980s and 1990s, the interchange between I-405 and SR 520 was upgraded in the early 1990s, and new ramps have been added in downtown Bellevue in recent years to supplement the original interchange at NE 8th Street.

==== SR 520 ====
SR 520 begins in Seattle at I-5 and continues east across Lake Washington on the Evergreen Point Bridge through Bellevue, interchanges with I-405, then turns northeast, passes the main Microsoft campus (which funded an overpass at NE 36th St and an interchange at NE 40th to supplement the existing interchange at NE 51st St), and terminates in Redmond at SR 202. The section between I-5 and Bellevue Way was opened in 1963, with the interchange at I-405 built in 1966. It was further extended to it current terminus between 1973 and 1982. The Washington State Department of Transportation is currently widening the freeway on the Eastside, modifying interchanges, and moving the HOV lanes to the inside of the roadway.

==== SR 167 ====
SR 167, also known as the Valley Freeway, begins in Renton at I-405 and continues south through Kent, Auburn, where it interchanges with SR 410, Pacific, and Algona, then interchanges with SR 410, and currently terminates at SR 161. The Valley Freeway was built in stages between 1964 and 1977, with a major upgrade of its southern end in 1986. The Washington State Department of Transportation is currently planning to extend the freeway to Tacoma. SR 167 has HOV lanes between I-405 and SR 18 which also allow single-passenger vehicles to use them for a variable fee, also known as HOT lanes.

==== SR 99/SR 599 ====
SR 99/SR 599, parts of which are also known as West Marginal Way, begins in Tukwila at I-5 and continues north to the First Avenue South Bridge, where it interchanges with SR 509, then continues as a surface street (East Marginal Way) for a few miles, then, adjacent to CenturyLink Field, becomes the SR 99 Tunnel. This tunnel passes under downtown Seattle and emerges in South Lake Union as Aurora Avenue, a divided expressway (partial control of access with interchanges) until Green Lake, where it becomes a surface street again. SR 599 was built in 1968, the freeway portion of SR 99 was built in 1956 as was the First Avenue South Bridge (a second structure was built next to the first in the early 1990s), and the Alaskan Way Viaduct was open in 1952, with an extension open in 1959, until its closure and demolition in 2019. North of that, Aurora Avenue was built in 1932, including the cantilever/truss George Washington Memorial Bridge. SR 99 is served by multiple local and express busses including the bus rapid transit Rapid Ride A and E Line.

==== West Seattle Freeway ====
The West Seattle Freeway begins in Seattle at I-5 and continues west, where it interchanges with SR 99 and terminates at a signal at Fauntleroy Way SW and 35th Avenue SW. The West Seattle Freeway was built in 1941, and the high-level bridge opened in 1984 and the roadway was widened in 2012 between I-5 and SR 99.

==== Other freeways ====
Most of the other freeways in the Seattle area are two lanes in each direction and generally travel in a north–south direction, with the exceptions of US 2, SR 410, SR 512, SR 518, SR 526, and Waaga Way. SR 16 is signed east–west but it travels mostly north–south.

== Public transit ==
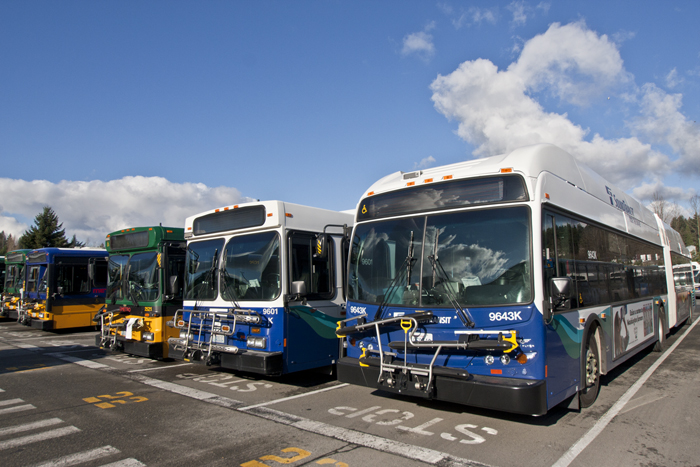
Public transit buses at a base in Seattle. Buses with the green-and-yellow livery and blue-and-yellow livery are King County Metro buses; the bus with the white-and-blue livery is a Sound Transit bus.

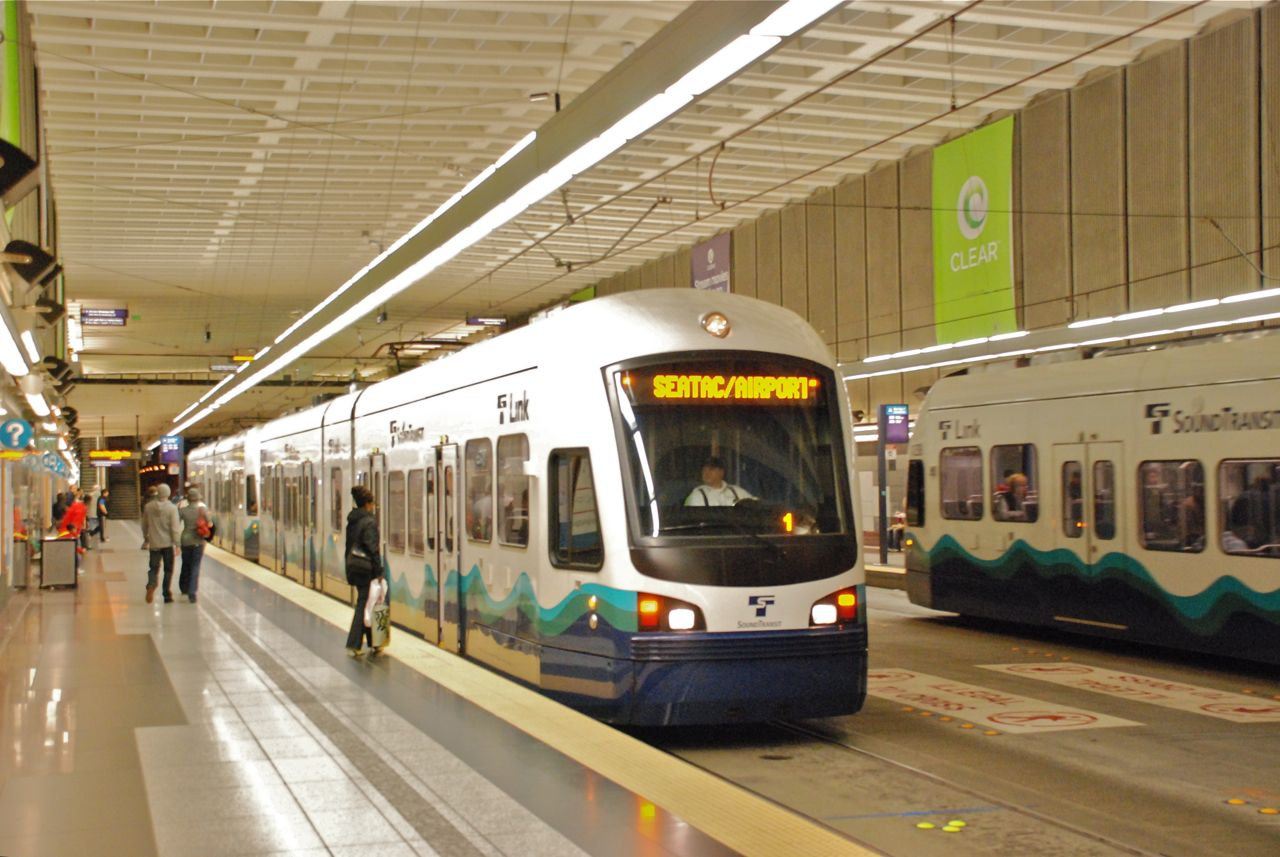
1 Line light rail trains in the Downtown Seattle Transit Tunnel at the Symphony station

The Seattle metropolitan area has a large public transportation network that is divided between several government agencies and entities. In 2024, the systems carried a total of 151 million passengers on buses, trains, ferries, and paratransit vehicles across the metropolitan area. The largest system is King County Metro (also known as Metro Transit), which has 143 routes and carried 270,000 passengers on an average weekday in 2024. Metro also maintains a network of trolleybus routes in Seattle that is among the largest in the United States. Sound Transit is the regional transit authority, commissioned by voters in 1996 to build a system of light rail, express buses, and commuter rail within the Central Puget Sound area. The agency provides a number of regional express bus routes connecting Seattle with neighboring suburbs and cities.

The Sounder commuter rail system consists of two lines, linking Seattle with Lakewood along its South Line and Seattle with Everett along its North Line. Several stations in intermediate cities along the lines are also served; the trains run primarily during peak hours in the peak direction.

The light rail system, called Link light rail, includes the initial 15.7-mile (25.3 km) from downtown Seattle to Sea-Tac Airport, which began service in 2009. Extension to the University of Washington via the University Link tunnel and Angle Lake station began service in 2016; they were followed by the Northgate Link Extension in 2021. It was named the 1 Line and was joined by other lines in future extensions approved by voters in 2008 and 2016. A second line, the 2 Line, opened in 2024 to serve the Eastside and is planned to be extended into Seattle in 2026. By 2025, the 1 Line had been extended to over 40 miles (64 km) and 26 stations between Lynnwood and Federal Way. The Sound Transit 3 ballot measure, passed in 2016, will further expand the system both regionally and within the city, with service to Tacoma, Everett, Issaquah, south Kirkland, and to the neighborhoods Ballard and West Seattle.

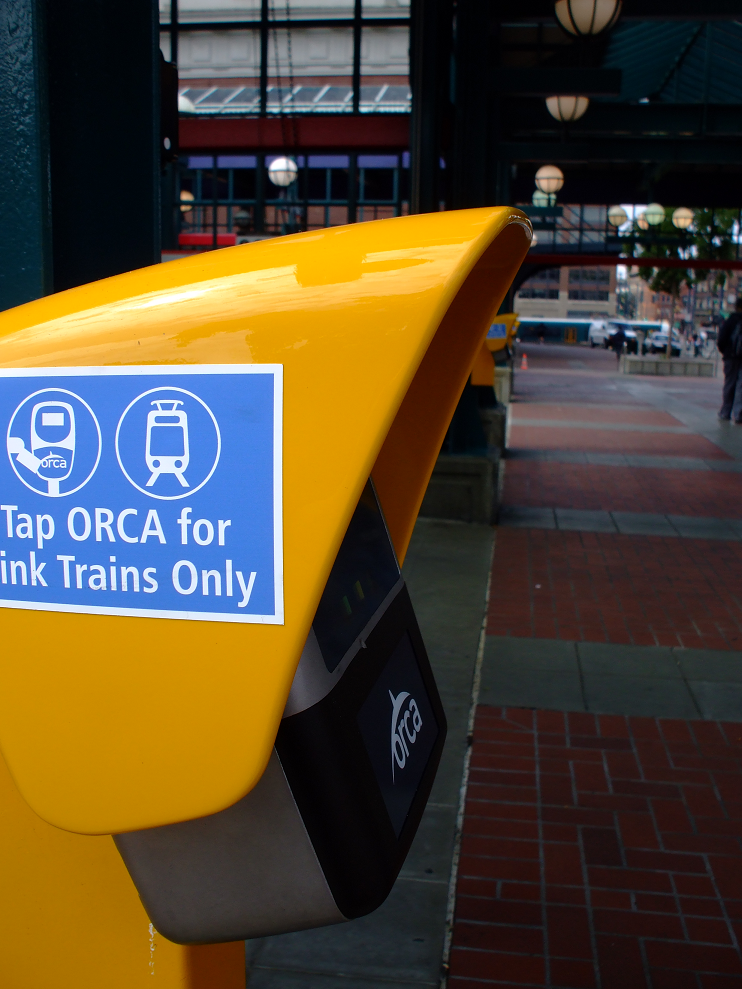
ORCA readers at the Chinatown-International District station

The Downtown Seattle Transit Tunnel is a 1.3-mile tunnel under downtown built in 1987 and opened in 1990, to relieve bus congestion along surface streets. Originally served by dual-mode buses that operated electrically within it, the tunnel was retrofitted from 2005 to 2007 to accommodate light rail, and in 2009, Link light rail trains began serving tunnel stations as part of the initial Central Link segment. All tunnel bus routes were rerouted to surface streets in 2019 to make way for the demolition of Convention Place Station, making the tunnel an exclusive subway for Link trains within the city core. Above the tunnel, 3rd Avenue through downtown serves as a major bus arterial, with access restricted to buses only during peak commuting hours.

The city is currently in the process of expanding a modern streetcar network. In December 2007, the city inaugurated its South Lake Union Streetcar line between Westlake Center and stops in the South Lake Union neighborhood. In 2009, the Seattle city council approved a second line, the First Hill Streetcar, to connect First Hill to Link light rail at Capitol Hill and International District/Chinatown stations. The line began service in 2016 after two years of delays. Metro Transit also operated a historic Waterfront Streetcar line that ran along Alaskan Way, but the streetcar's maintenance barn was demolished to make room for the Olympic Sculpture Park, resulting in the subsequent closure of the line. King County Metro now operates a replacement bus line that mirrors the route. The proposed City Center Connector project would connect the South Lake Union and First Hill streetcars into a single line with a routing along 1st Avenue in Downtown Seattle.

In 2009, the ORCA card was introduced as a new way for fare payment between the seven transit agencies in the Puget Sound region. The card uses RFID technology to handle payment from either passes, vouchers, or the E-purse, a stored value debit account. ORCA's precursor, PugetPass, will be retained as one of the several passes that can be loaded automatically onto the card. The system also calculates transfers for a two-hour window for those paying with the E-purse. Since 2022, all transit agencies in the Puget Sound area have waived fares for passengers under the age of 18 as part of a statewide program.

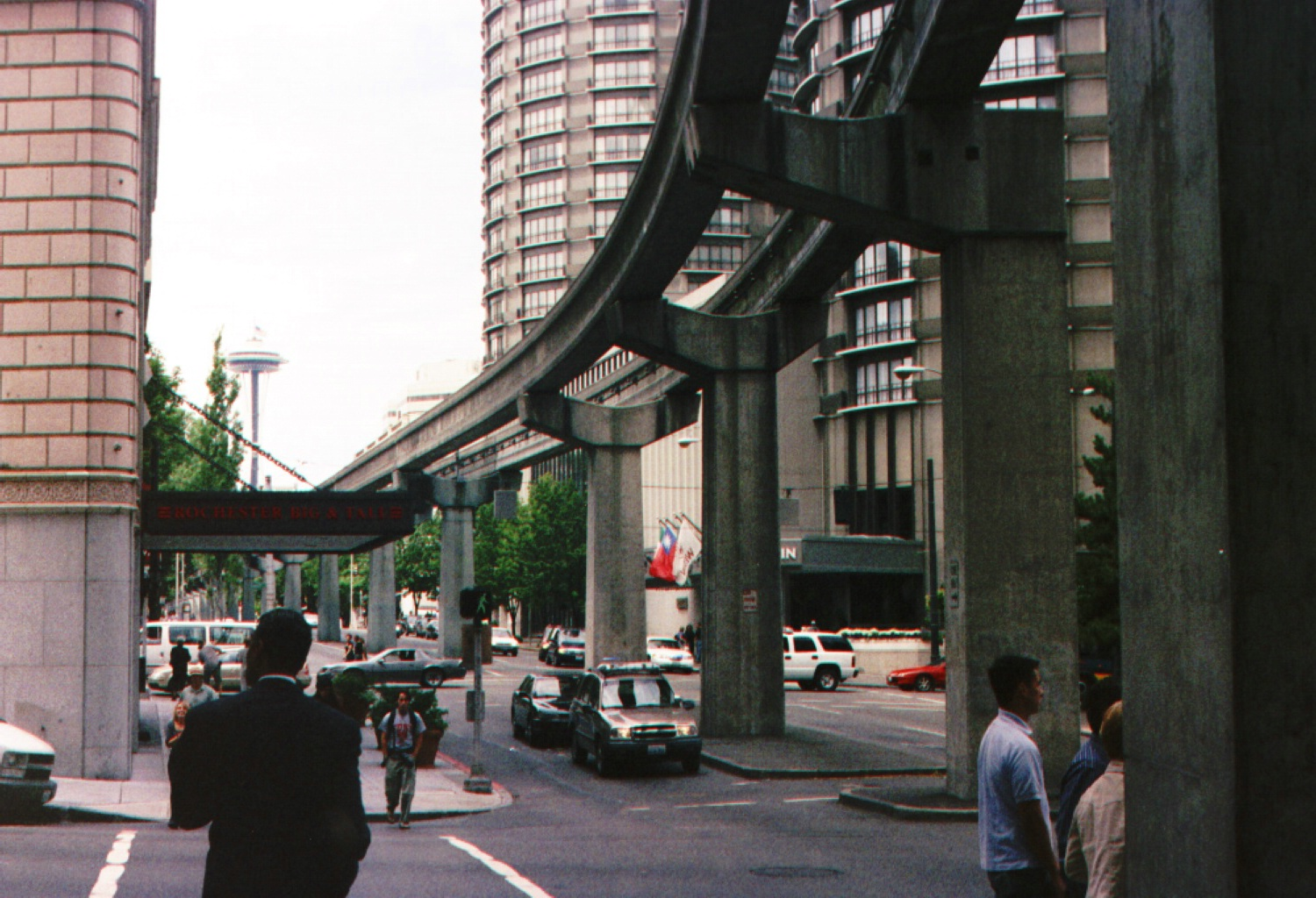
Seattle Center Monorail

The Seattle Center Monorail, constructed for the Century 21 Exposition, runs approximately 1 mile (1.6 km) between Seattle Center in Lower Queen Anne and Westlake Center in Downtown.

Local transit agencies offer trip planners on their web sites that provide information for public transit in Seattle and surrounding areas (King, Pierce, and Snohomish counties). Riders enter their intended origin and destination, along with optional time, date, and other information, and the trip planner displays itineraries showing the stops, departure and arrival times, and times to get from the origin to the destination. Trip planning, schedules, and real-time arrivals are also available on third-party maps, such as Google Maps, and through dedicated apps such as OneBusAway.

BoltBus began offering Seattle's first curbside intercity coach service in May 2012, with Portland as its first destination. The service later expanded with stops in Everett and Tacoma, but was discontinued by parent company Greyhound in 2021.

=== Public transportation statistics ===
The Seattle metropolitan area has historically had robust ridership for a predominantly bus-based transit system. It was one of the few major transit systems to gain ridership in the 2010s, in a period of increased ride-hailing services and lower gas prices. Only 10% of King County Metro riders rely on the agency for all or most of their trips and do not have access to a vehicle. As of 2016, 48% of all trips to downtown were on transit. Following the COVID-19 pandemic, the ACS found transit use by downtown commuters declined 55 percent, largely replaced by remote work. As of 2026, Link ridership has fully recovered, claiming first place for the most ridership of any light rail system in the country. Bike trips have also surpassed 2019 levels. Other systems like Sounder and Metro Vanpool are gaining riders more slowly.

According to Moovit, the average amount of time Seattle-area commuters spend using public transit on a weekday is 74 minutes. 27% of public transit riders commute for more than two hours every day. The average amount of time people wait at a stop or station for public transit is 14 minutes, while 22% of riders wait for over 20 minutes on average every day. The average distance people usually ride in a single trip with public transit is 12.5 km, while 34% travel for over 12 km in a single direction.

== Bicycles and scooters ==
2013 photo showing bike lanes crossing at Pine and Broadway.

There are extensive multi-use car-free regional pathways linking the city and county to the surrounding areas, including the King County Regional Trails System, which has 175 miles (282 km) of trails throughout the county. Many of the trails were converted from former railways, including the popular Burke–Gilman Trail. The Seattle Department of Transportation aims to develop a 608.3-mile (979.0 km) network of bike lanes, including lanes on streets, protected bike lanes, and trails, within the city by 2034. The city opened its first protected intersection in May 2024 at Dexter Avenue and Thomas Street in South Lake Union, which was used by a daily average of 680 cyclists in October 2023.

Burke-Gilman pedestrian and bike trail

Seattle hosted a non-profit bike sharing system, Pronto Cycle Share, from 2014 through 2017. In July 2017 A pilot program allowing private dockless bike sharing companies within the city began, making Seattle the first major city in North America to feature such a system. Several private operators debuted bicycles, later expanding to e-scooters after they were approved by the city government in 2020. In 2022, SDOT recorded 1.1 million bicycle trips and 2.7 million scooter trips on these systems. During 2025, over 10 million bike/scooter share trips were taken.

== Airports ==
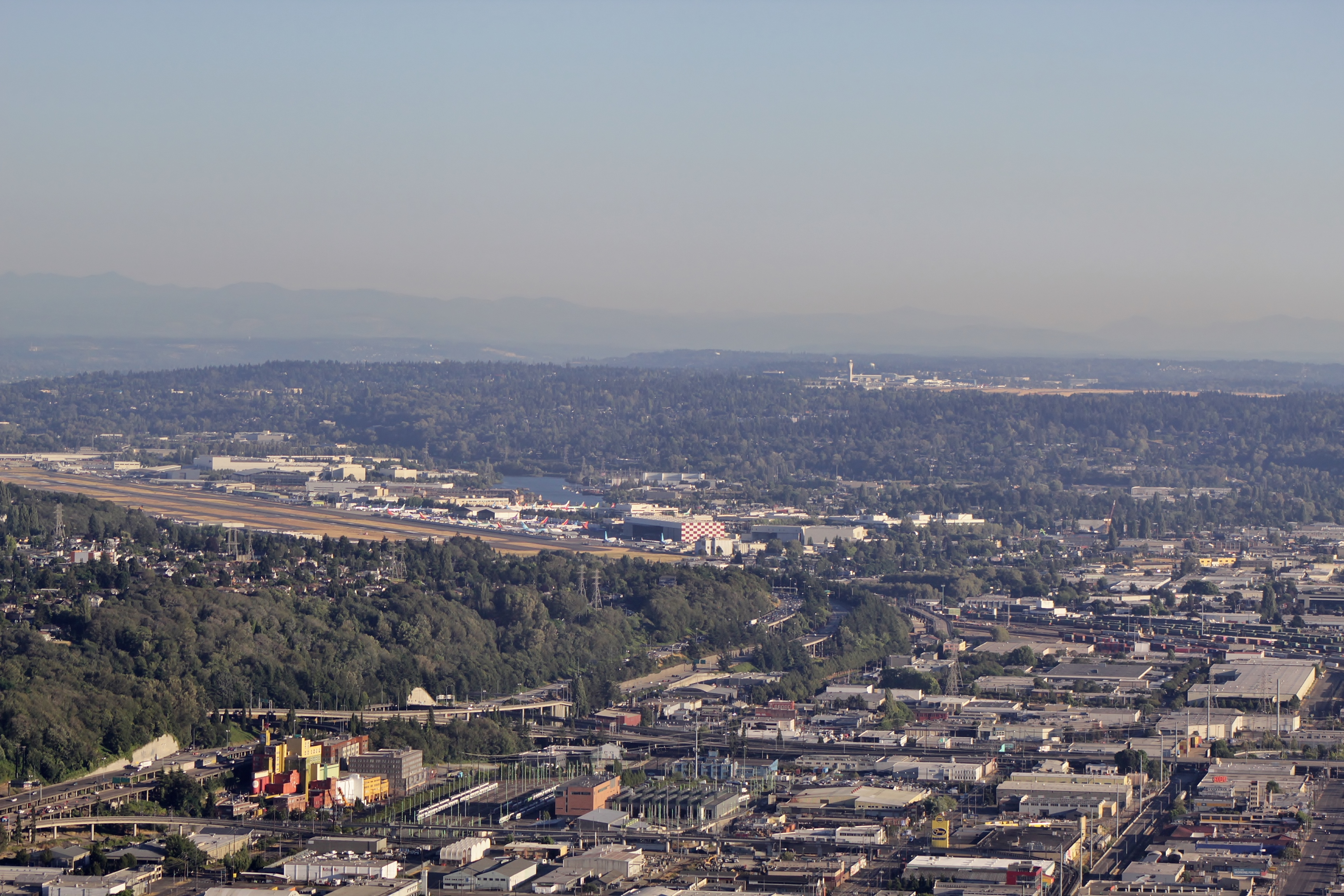
Aerial view of Boeing Field (left, foreground) and Seattle–Tacoma International Airport (right, background) from Downtown Seattle

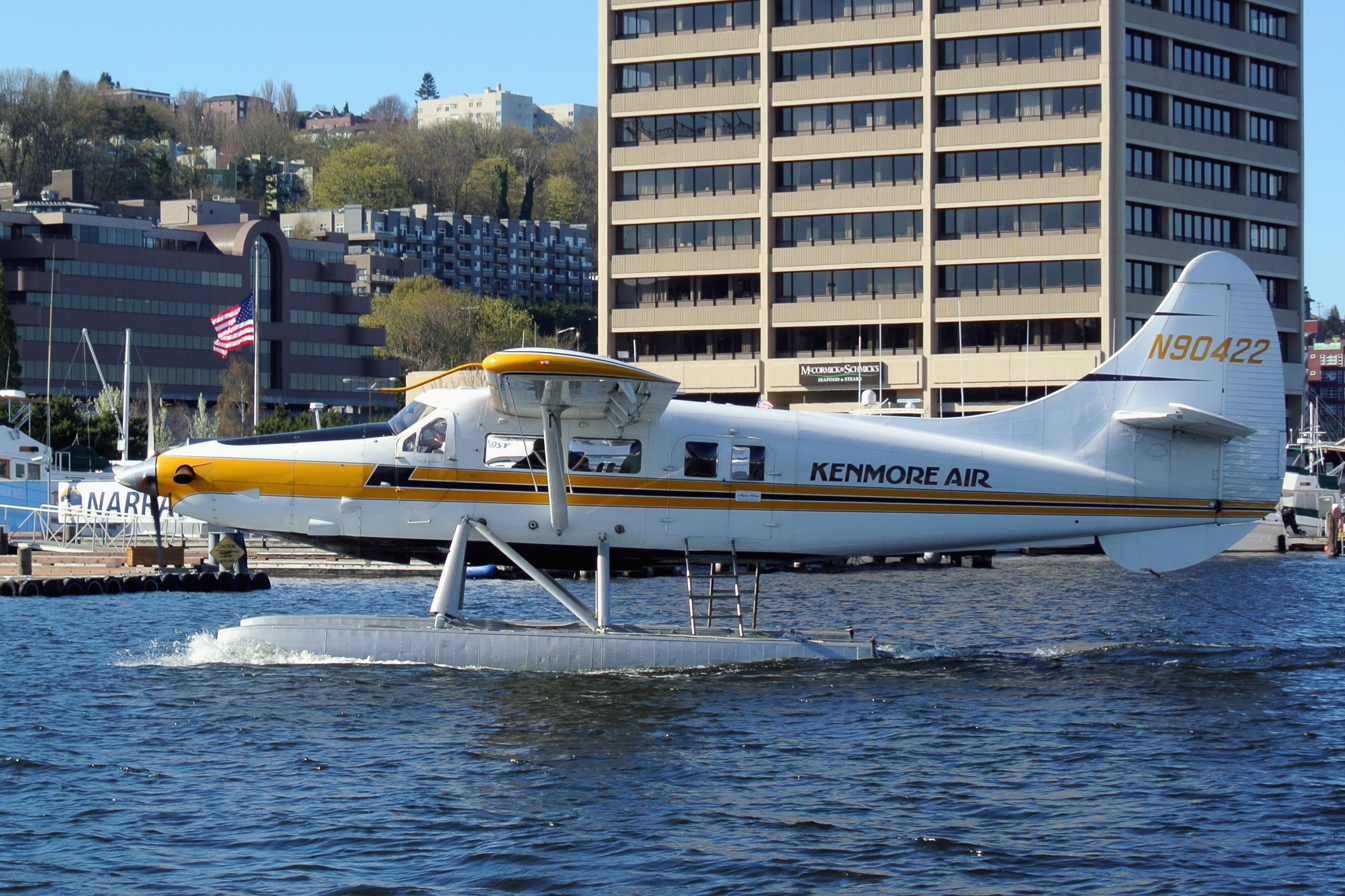
Kenmore Air DHC-3 Otter on Lake Union (Kenmore Air Harbor Seaplane Base)

The Seattle metropolitan area has several airports that support commercial use as well as general aviation. The city's primary commercial airport is Seattle–Tacoma International Airport, locally known as Sea-Tac Airport and located in the city of SeaTac, which is named for the airport. It is operated by the Port of Seattle and is served by a number of airlines connecting the region with international, national, and domestic destinations. The airport is a major hub for Delta Air Lines as well as Alaska Airlines and its regional subsidiary, Horizon Air.

Paine Field in Everett also began operating flights in March 2019 following the construction of a two-gate passenger terminal. It receives a limited number of daily flights from Alaska Airlines; prior to 2021, it also had United Airlines service.

Closer to downtown, Boeing Field is primarily used for general aviation, cargo flights, and testing/delivery of Boeing airliners. In 2005, Southwest Airlines requested permission to move passenger operations from Sea-Tac to Boeing Field but were rejected by the county. Boeing Field has commercial flights to the San Juan Islands. The Kenmore Air Harbor Seaplane Base on Lake Union, immediately north of downtown, is used by two airlines that operate floatplanes to the San Juan Islands and British Columbia.

=== Proposed airports ===
The state government formed the Commercial Aviation Coordinating Commission (CACC) in 2019 to investigate sites for a new commercial airport that would serve the Puget Sound region and relieve pressure at Sea-Tac. The new airport would accommodate 20 million passengers annually by 2050 and have two runways. The plan assumes that Sea-Tac and Paine Field would be expanded to handle 67 million annual passengers, which would fall below the projected 94 million annual passengers using Seattle-area airports.

In September 2022, the commission identified expansion of Paine Field or the construction of a new airport in southern Pierce County or northern Thurston County as potential options. The wider field of 10 candidates also included options in Kitsap, Skagit, and Snohomish counties. Opposition to the Pierce County and Thurston County sites formed following the September 2022 announcement, citing potential noise and traffic impacts. The CACC was planned to recommend a site to the state legislature by June 2023. The commission was dissolved by the legislature in May 2023 due to public backlash and is planned to be replaced by a new working group that would monitor and review statewide aviation needs on an annual basis.

== See also ==
- Lake Washington steamboats and ferries
- Public stairways in Seattle
- Street layout of Seattle
- Plug-in electric vehicles in Washington (state) § Seattle

== Bibliography ==
- Peterson, Lorin; Davenport, Noah C. (1950). "Living in Seattle" (Document). Seattle: Seattle Public Schools.
- Newell, Gordon (1956). "Totem Tales of Old Seattle" (Document). Seattle: Superior Publishing Company.
