= East 21st Street Bridge =

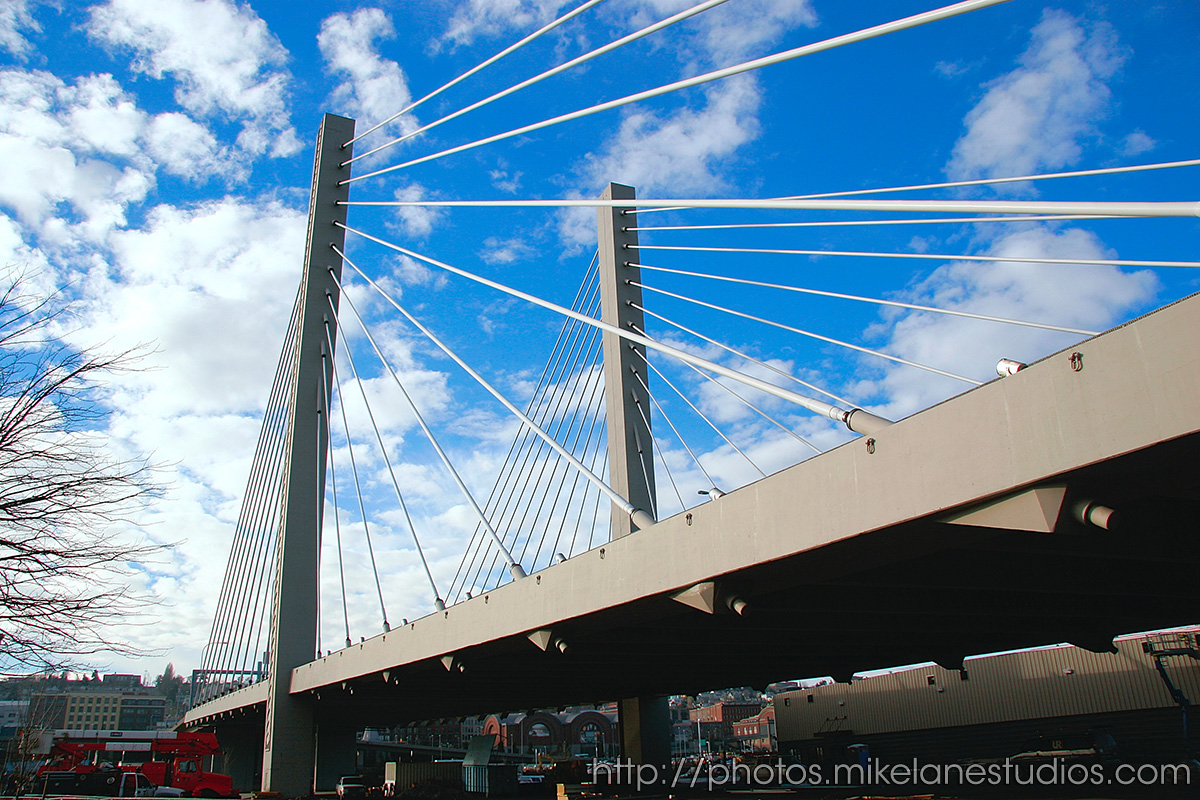
- Coordinates: 47.244°N 122.432°W
- Carries: 4 lanes of SR 509
- Crosses: Thea Foss Waterway
- Locale: Tacoma, Washington, United States

Characteristics
- Design: Cable-stayed bridge
- Total length: 682 ft (208 m) or more
- Width: 71.5 ft (21.8 m)
- Height: 180 ft (55 m)
- Longest span: 370 ft (110 m)

History
- Opened: January 22, 1997

The East 21st Street Bridge is a 682-foot (208 m) or 707-foot (215 m) or 992-foot (302 m) long cable-stayed bridge in Tacoma, Washington completed in January 1997. The bridge, whose most significant feature is two 180-foot (55 m) tall towers, carries four lanes State Route 509 (SR 509) across the Thea Foss Waterway from downtown Tacoma to the Port of Tacoma. SR 509 ends at a single point urban interchange with Interstate 705 west of the bridge, built as part of the same $165.3 million WSDOT project that also funded the bridge's construction.

The architect for the bridge was Jim Merritt, a Tacoma architect.

It is sometimes called Foss Waterway Bridge, although the Murray Morgan Bridge also crosses Foss Waterway.
