= Washington State Route 509 =

State highway in Washington, US

State Route 509
- SR 509 highlighted in red

Route information
- Auxiliary route of I-5
- Maintained by WSDOT
- Length: 35.17 mi (56.60 km)
- Existed: 1964–present

Major junctions
- South end: I-705 in Tacoma
- SR 99 in Federal Way; SR 516 in Des Moines; SR 518 in Burien
- North end: SR 99 in Seattle

Location
- Country: United States
- State: Washington
- Counties: Pierce, King

Highway system
- State highways in Washington; Interstate; US; State; Scenic; Pre-1964; 1964 renumbering; Former
← SR 508	→ SR 510

State Route 509 (SR 509) is a 35.17-mile-long (56.60 km) state highway in the U.S. state of Washington, connecting Tacoma in Pierce County to Seattle in King County. The highway travels north from Interstate 705 (I-705) in Tacoma to SR 99 south of downtown Seattle. It serves cities along the Puget Sound and west of Seattle–Tacoma International Airport in south King County, including Federal Way, Des Moines, and Burien. SR 509 is part of the National Highway System and is a limited-access highway near the Port of Tacoma and from Burien to its northern terminus in Seattle.

Prior to the 1964 highway renumbering, the highway was part of Secondary State Highway 1V (SSH 1V) from Tacoma to Des Moines and SSH 1K from Des Moines to Seattle. SR 509 was re-aligned onto the Burien Freeway in 1968 and the Port of Tacoma bypass in 1997, coinciding with the opening of its interchange with I-705 and the cable-stayed 21st Street Bridge. A freeway extension of SR 509 within the city of SeaTac, connecting the Burien Freeway to I-5, is planned to be completed by 2028.

== Route description ==
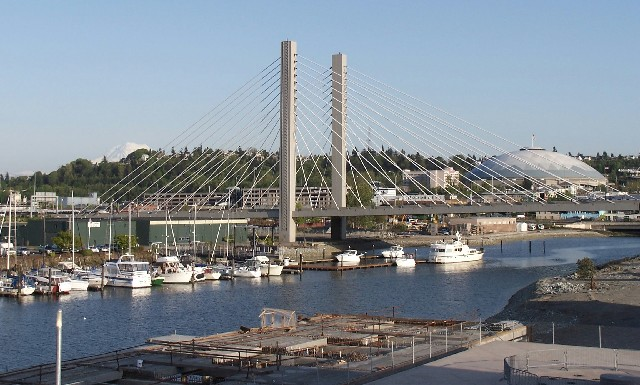
SR 509 traveling across the Thea Foss Waterway on the cable-stayed 21st Street Bridge within Tacoma, connecting downtown to the Port of Tacoma.

SR 509 begins as South 21st Street at a single-point urban interchange with I-705 in downtown Tacoma in Pierce County, providing access to the Tacoma campus of the University of Washington and the Tacoma Link light rail line on Pacific Avenue. The highway travels east over the Thea Foss Waterway on the cable-stayed 21st Street Bridge into the Port of Tacoma as a four-lane limited-access highway, intersecting Portland Avenue in a half-diamond interchange before crossing the Puyallup River. SR 509 continues east, parallel to a City of Tacoma rail line through a partial cloverleaf interchange with Port of Tacoma Road before the divided highway ends at Taylor Way. The highway turns northwest along the Hylebos Waterway as Marine View Drive through the neighborhood of Northeast Tacoma towards Browns Point. SR 509 passes through Dash Point and its state park along the Puget Sound into King County and the city of Federal Way. The highway travels east as Dash Point Road through Federal Way past Decatur and Federal Way high schools before a junction with SR 99 west of I-5. The concurrent SR 99 and SR 509 travel north as the Pacific Highway past Highline Community College to an intersection with SR 516 in western Kent. SR 509 turns west to form a concurrency with SR 516, heading past Mount Rainier High School and into Des Moines, where SR 516 ends.

SR 509 continues north onto Marine View Drive through the city of Normandy Park and into SeaTac. The highway turns southeast onto Ambaum Boulevard and Des Moines Memorial Drive to a trumpet interchange, the southern terminus of a limited-access freeway section of SR 509. The four-lane freeway travels west of Seattle–Tacoma International Airport through a closed half-diamond interchange with South 176th Street and a partial cloverleaf interchange with South 160th Street before entering the city of Burien. SR 509 passes Highline High School before reaching a partial cloverleaf interchange with Southwest 148th Street and the western terminus of SR 518. The freeway continues north into the West Seattle neighborhood of Seattle and intersects South 128th Street in a diamond interchange and South 112th Street in a half-diamond interchange. SR 509 enters the Industrial District of Seattle and heads through an interchange with Cloverdale Street and Myers Way before ending at a partial cloverleaf interchange with SR 99 south of the First Avenue South Bridge over the Duwamish Waterway. The roadway continues north as the SR 99 divided highway toward downtown Seattle and the State Route 99 tunnel.

Every year, the Washington State Department of Transportation (WSDOT) conducts a series of surveys on its highways in the state to measure traffic volume. This is expressed in terms of annual average daily traffic (AADT), which is a measure of traffic volume for any average day of the year. In 2011, WSDOT calculated that the busiest section of SR 509 was the limited-access highway between Burien and its northern terminus in Seattle, serving 54,000 vehicles, while the least busiest section was within Dash Point and Dash Point State Park, serving 2,600 vehicles. SR 509 between SeaTac and Seattle is designated as part of the National Highway System, which includes roadways important to the national economy, defense, and mobility. The highway from Tacoma to Federal Way and from SeaTac to Seattle are designated as part of WSDOT's Highways of Statewide Significance, which includes highways that connect major communities in the state of Washington.

== History ==
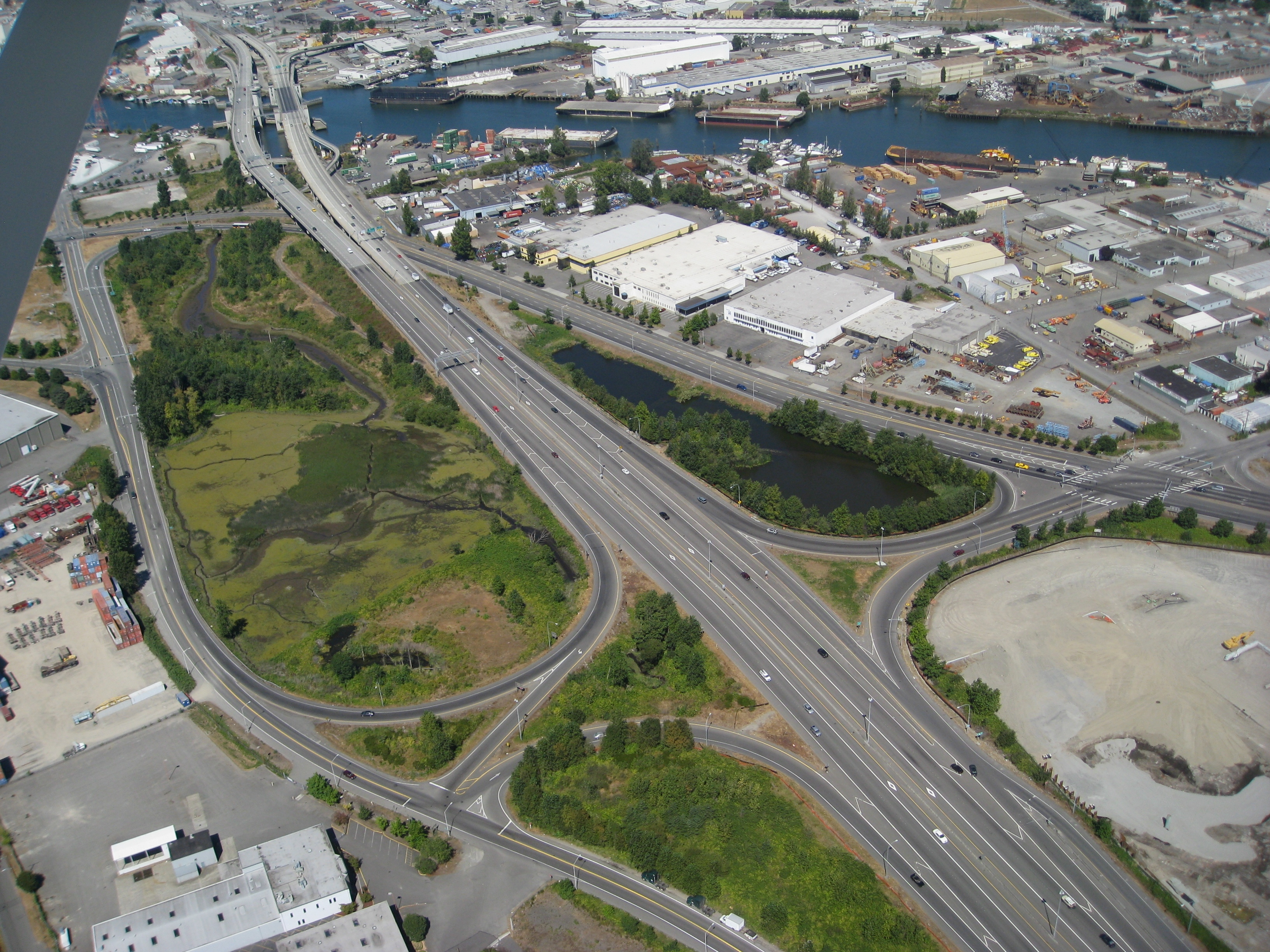
The northern terminus of SR 509, at an interchange with SR 99 constructed in the 1990s

The present route of SR 509 from Des Moines to Seattle roughly follows a wagon road constructed in the late 1890s by King County along the Puget Sound. The highway between Federal Way and Kent was codified in 1923 as part of State Road 1 and in 1937 as Primary State Highway 1 (PSH 1). During the creation of the primary and secondary state highways in 1937, the highway between Tacoma and Federal Way was designated as SSH 1V and the highway between Des Moines and Seattle was designated as SSH 1K. SSH 1V traveled 19.54 miles (31.45 km) north from PSH 1 in Tacoma through the Port of Tacoma on the 11th Street Bridge and the Blair Bridge, opened in 1913 and 1953 respectively, to Federal Way, ending at an intersection with SSH 1K. SSH 1K traveled 12.76 miles (20.54 km) south from PSH 1 at the First Avenue South Bridge in Seattle through Burien and east through Des Moines to PSH 1 in Midway. The two highways were combined during the 1964 highway renumbering to become SR 509 and was codified into law in 1970.

The Des Moines–Burien Freeway was approved by the Washington State Highway Commission in 1966, as part of a longer freeway corridor connecting the ports of Tacoma and Seattle. An earlier proposal from 1967 to connect the north end of SR 509 to I-5 via an expressway on Michigan Street and a new crossing of the Duwamish River was studied but was never built. SR 509 was realigned onto the newly constructed Burien Freeway in November 1968, extending from Seattle to SeaTac. The highway was originally routed through Saltwater State Park on Marine View Drive until 1991, when SR 509 was moved to two concurrencies with SR 99 in Federal Way and SR 516 in Des Moines.

The freeway was planned to be extended south to SR 516 in the 1970s after a 4-mile (6.4 km) right-of-way was acquired by WSDOT before the project was canceled due to public opposition. The King County Department of Public Works recommended extending SR 509 southeast from South 188th Street to I-5 in 1988, with construction planned to begin in 1999 at an estimated cost of $252 million in 1996, raised to $1.4 billion a decade later. A freeway bypass of the Port of Tacoma for SR 509 was proposed in 1990 as a supplement to the newly completed I-705 and funded with a $180 million grant from the Federal Highway Administration approved the following year. Construction began in early 1994 amid controversy over the freeway's effects on the redevelopment of the Thea Foss Waterway. The first section of the new freeway opened in August 1995, while the cable-stayed bridge over the Thea Foss Waterway and single-point urban interchange with I-705 opened on January 22, 1997. The project cost a total of $165.3 million to construct, with the majority of funds from the federal government and a land claims settlement with the Puyallup Tribe. The Blair Bridge was closed and demolished to make way for a wider channel on the Blair Waterway for larger container ships.

As part of the Puget Sound Gateway Program approved in 2015, WSDOT plans to build a freeway extension of SR 509 around the south side of Seattle–Tacoma International Airport and a spur freeway near the Port of Tacoma. The projects, together with an extension of State Route 167, are anticipated to cost $2 billion and were originally proposed in the mid-20th century. Land acquisition was completed between 1969 and 1980 for a similar extension through Des Moines, but local opposition prevented its construction. The three-mile (4.8 km) extension near SeaTac and a new interchange with I-5 began construction in November 2021 and is scheduled to be completed by 2028 in three stages. The first major stage, which constructed a one-mile (1.6 km) segment connecting I-5 to 24th Avenue South, including an overpass at SR 99, was scheduled to be completed in 2025, and later opened on June 28 that year. The Port of Tacoma project would also open in 2028, constructing a new diverging diamond interchange with I-5 near Fife for the extended SR 167 and a short freeway designated as SR 509 Spur. The SR 509 expansion was initially planned in the early 1990s and had funding approved by the legislature in 1998, but it was cancelled by later ballot measures.

== Major intersections ==
County	Location	mi	km	Destinations	Notes
Pierce	Tacoma	0.00– 0.02	0.00– 0.032	I-705 to SR 7 / I-5 / Schuster Parkway – Ruston, Seattle, Portland	Western terminus, interchange
Pierce	Tacoma	0.06– 0.25	0.097– 0.40	21st Street Bridge	
Pierce	Tacoma			South end of freeway	
Pierce	Tacoma	0.51– 0.71	0.82– 1.14	Portland Avenue	Northbound exit and southbound entrance
Pierce	Tacoma	1.66– 2.80	2.67– 4.51	Port of Tacoma Road	
Pierce	Tacoma			North end of freeway	
King	Federal Way	17.48	28.13	SR 99 south (Pacific Highway)	South end of SR 99 overlap
King	Kent	21.58	34.73	SR 99 north / SR 516 east to I-5 – SeaTac	North end of SR 99 overlap, south end of SR 516 overlap
King	Des Moines	23.37	37.61	Marine View Drive	North end of SR 516 overlap
King	SeaTac	28.05– 28.47	45.14– 45.82	Des Moines Memorial Drive / South 188th Street	
King	SeaTac			South end of freeway	
King	SeaTac	28.85– 28.99	46.43– 46.65	South 176th Street	
King	SeaTac	29.16– 29.88	46.93– 48.09	South 160th Street	
King	Burien	30.07– 30.70	48.39– 49.41	SR 518 east to I-5 / I-405 / Southwest 148th Street – Sea-Tac	
King	Burien	30.93– 31.02	49.78– 49.92	South 146th Street	Northbound entrance and southbound exit
King	Burien	31.43– 32.07	50.58– 51.61	South 128th Street	
King	Burien	32.89– 33.11	52.93– 53.29	South 112th Street / 5th Avenue South / Glendale Way South	Northbound entrance and southbound exit
King	Seattle	34.03– 34.73	54.77– 55.89	Cloverdale Street / Myers Way – South Park, White Center	
King	Seattle	35.12– 35.17	56.52– 56.60	SR 99 (West Marginal Way)	Northern terminus, continues as SR 99
1.000 mi = 1.609 km; 1.000 km = 0.621 mi: Closed/former; Concurrency terminus; Incomplete access
