= Washington State Route 518 =

State highway in King County, Washington, US

State Route 518
- SR 518 is highlighted in red

Route information
- Auxiliary route of I-5
- Maintained by WSDOT
- Length: 3.42 mi (5.50 km)
- Existed: 1964–present

Major junctions
- West end: SR 509 in Burien
- SR 99 in Seatac
- East end: I-5 / I-405 in Tukwila

Location
- Country: United States
- State: Washington
- County: King

Highway system
- State highways in Washington; Interstate; US; State; Scenic; Pre-1964; 1964 renumbering; Former
← SR 516	→ SR 519

State Route 518 (SR 518) is a 3.42-mile-long (5.50 km) state highway located entirely within King County in the U.S. state of Washington. The freeway begins in Burien at an interchange with SR 509 and travels east to serve Seattle–Tacoma International Airport and intersect SR 99 in SeaTac. SR 518 continues east into Tukwila and ends at an interchange with Interstate 5 (I-5), as the freeway becomes I-405. The highway was codified in 1937 as the western segment of Secondary State Highway 1L (SSH 1L) and designated as SR 518 during the 1964 highway renumbering. During the 1970s, the roadway was widened into a freeway to serve the airport and serves over 100,000 vehicles per day.

== Route description ==
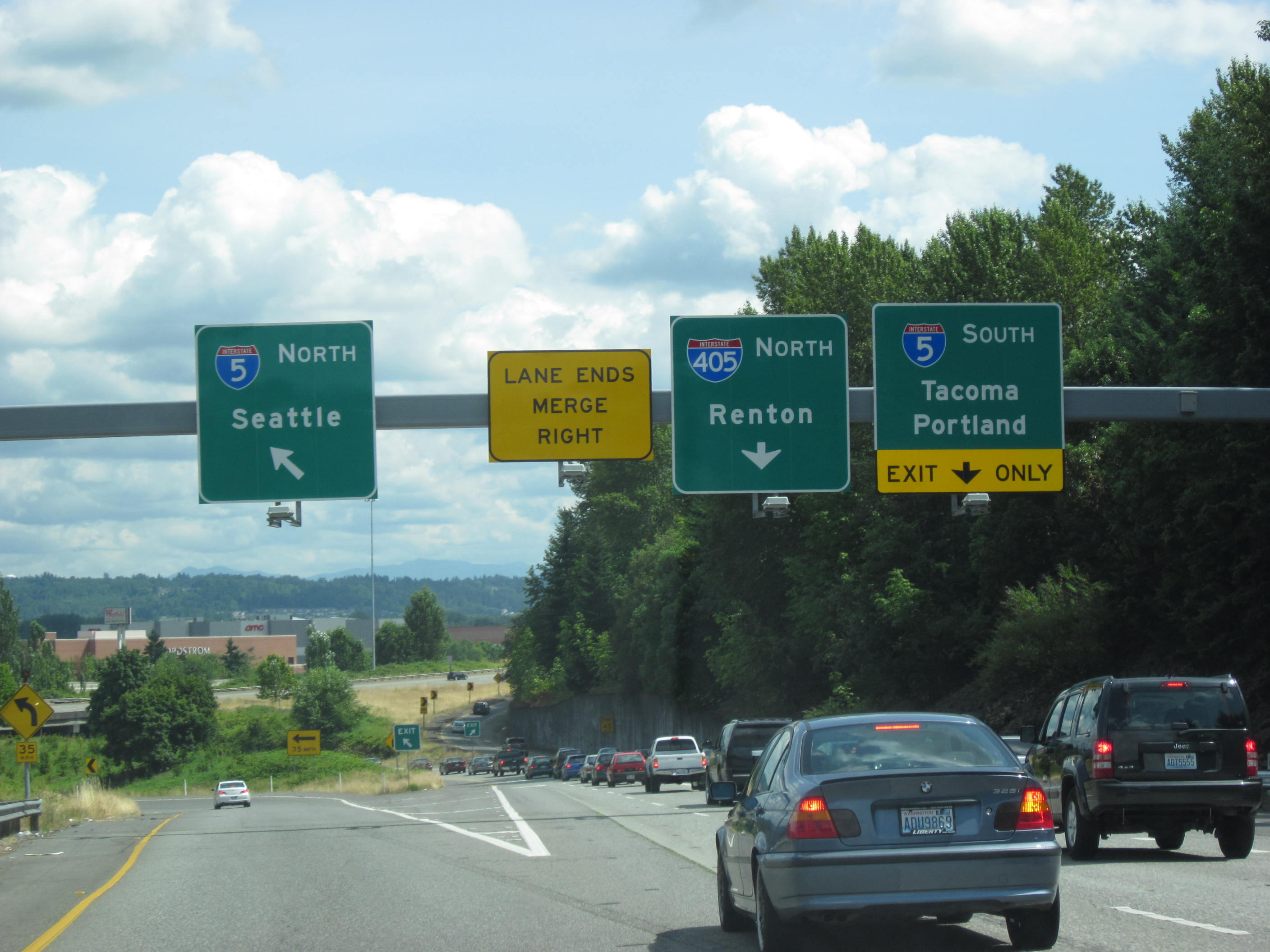
SR 518 eastbound approaching its interchange with I-5 and I-405 in Tukwila.

SR 518 begins at a partial cloverleaf interchange with SR 509 east of Burien and travels east as a divided freeway, passing north of Highline High School. The freeway intersects Des Moines Memorial Drive and 154th Street north of Seattle–Tacoma International Airport and continues east into SeaTac. SR 518 intersects the Airport Expressway and International Boulevard, signed as SR 99, south of the Tukwila International Boulevard station. The freeway follows the Central Link light rail line into Tukwila and intersects 51st Avenue before an interchange with I-5. At the interchange, located northwest of the Westfield Southcenter Mall, the Central Link turns north along I-5 and SR 518 ends as the roadway continues east as I-405 towards Renton.

Every year, the Washington State Department of Transportation (WSDOT) conducts a series of surveys on its highways in the state to measure traffic volume. This is expressed in terms of annual average daily traffic (AADT), which is a measure of traffic volume for any average day of the year. In 2011, WSDOT calculated that between 38,000 and 102,000 vehicles per day used the highway, mostly between Seattle–Tacoma International Airport and I-5. SR 518 is designated as part of the National Highway System and as a Highway of Statewide Significance for serving Seattle–Tacoma International Airport.

== History ==
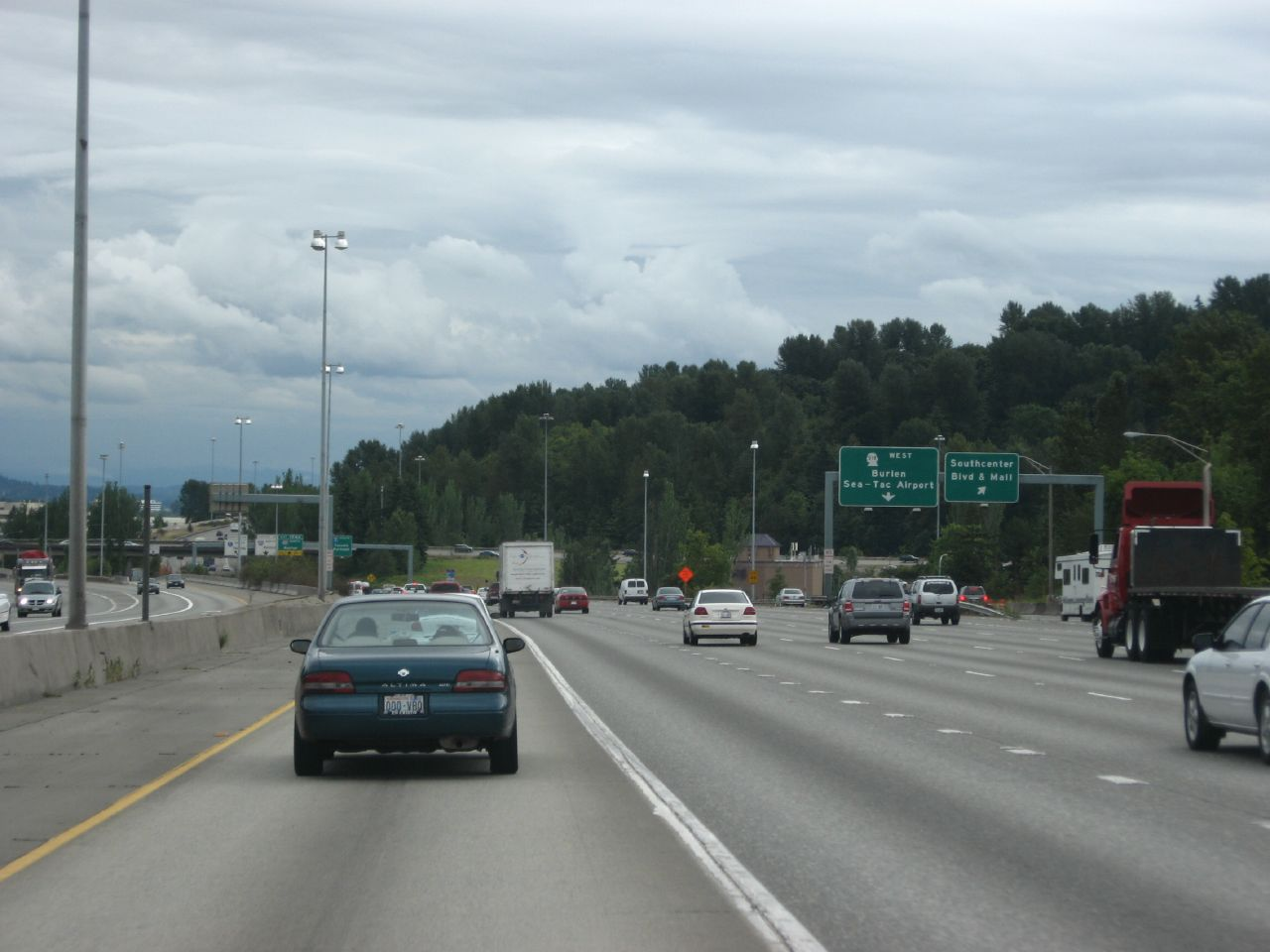
Southbound I-5 at its interchange with I-405 and SR 518 in Tukwila.

A highway between Burien and Tukwila has existed since the 1890s and was first codified in 1937 as a segment of SSH 1L, which extended from PSH 5 in Renton west to intersect PSH 1 and US 99 in Tukwila and end at SSH 1K south of Sunnydale, later renamed Burien. The section between PSH 5 in Renton and PSH 1 in Tukwila was removed in 1957 after the construction of the Seattle–Tacoma International Airport, located on PSH 1 and US 99. The remaining highway was later re-designated as SR 518 during the 1964 highway renumbering, being codified as such in 1970. The western terminus of SR 518, an interchange with SR 509, was opened to traffic in November 1968, while the Airport Expressway was opened in 1970 and widened in the 1990s by the Port of Seattle. The freeway segment between SR 99 and I-5 was built in the 1970s. No major revisions to the route of SR 518 have occurred since the 1990s, however SR 99 from SR 518 to SR 599 was removed to the highway system in 2003.

Beginning in 2005, an elevated light rail guideway was constructed on the north side of SR 518, for Sound Transit's Central Link line serving Downtown Seattle, the Rainier Valley and Sea-Tac Airport. The construction led to nighttime closures of the highway and other interruptions until construction finished in 2007. Tukwila International Boulevard station was built to the north of SR 518 at its interchange with SR 99 (International Boulevard) near Sea-Tac Airport.

== Exit list ==
The entire highway is in King County.

Location	mi	km	Destinations	Notes
Burien	0.00– 0.32	0.00– 0.51	SR 509 – Des Moines, Seattle	Western terminus, continues as 148th Street
Burien	0.83	1.34	Des Moines Memorial Drive	No westbound entrance
SeaTac	0.83– 1.39	1.34– 2.24	To SR 99 / South 154th Street	Eastbound exit and westbound entrance
SeaTac	1.62– 2.31	2.61– 3.72	Sea-Tac Airport	
SeaTac	2.36– 2.52	3.80– 4.06	SR 99	Westbound exit and eastbound entrance
Tukwila	2.69– 2.94	4.33– 4.73	51st Avenue South, Southcenter Parkway	Eastbound exit and westbound entrance
Tukwila	3.01– 3.42	4.84– 5.50	I-5 – Seattle, Tacoma, Portland	Eastern terminus; I-5 north exit 154, south exits 154A-B
Tukwila	3.01– 3.42	4.84– 5.50	I-405 north – Renton, Bellevue	Continuation beyond I-5
1.000 mi = 1.609 km; 1.000 km = 0.621 mi: Incomplete access; Route transition
