= Interstate 705 =

Interstate highway in Tacoma, Washington

Interstate 705
- Tacoma Spur
- Interactive map of Downtown Tacoma with I-705 highlighted in red

Route information
- Auxiliary route of I-5
- Maintained by WSDOT
- Length: 1.50 mi (2.41 km)
- Existed: 1978–present
- History: Completed in 1988
- NHS: Entire route

Major junctions
- South end: I-5 / SR 7 in Tacoma
- SR 509 in Tacoma
- North end: Schuster Parkway in Tacoma

Location
- Country: United States
- State: Washington
- County: Pierce

Highway system
- Interstate Highway System; Main; Auxiliary; Suffixed; Business; Future; State highways in Washington; Interstate; US; State; Scenic; Pre-1964; 1964 renumbering; Former
← SR 704	→ SR 706

Interstate 705 (I-705), also known as the Tacoma Spur, is a short Interstate Highway in Tacoma, Washington, United States. It is a spur route of I-5 that connects the freeway to Downtown Tacoma, Tacoma's waterfront, North Tacoma, and the Tacoma Dome. I-705 was completed in 1988 and is one of the newest portions of the Interstate Highway System in Washington.

== Route description ==
I-705 is the shortest Interstate Highway in Washington, at 1.5 miles (2.4 km) in length, and primarily serves as a connector between I-5 and Downtown Tacoma. It begins as a continuation of SR 7 at an interchange with I-5 south of downtown Tacoma, near the Tacoma Dome and America's Car Museum. The freeway passes under I-5, following a gulch south until it terminates at South 38th Street; SR 7 continues beyond Tacoma on Pacific Avenue towards Spanaway and Mount Rainier National Park.

The freeway travels north with an exit to South 26th Street serving the Tacoma Dome and the adjacent Tacoma Dome Station transit complex. I-705 passes over the T Line streetcar near South 25th Street station and continues north to a single-point urban interchange with SR 509 at South 21st Street, which provides access to the University of Washington Tacoma campus and Port of Tacoma. Following a freight railroad, the freeway passes the Washington State History Museum and Union Station near the Bridge of Glass, a pedestrian overpass that crosses I-705 and links the Museum of Glass on the Thea Foss Waterway shore to downtown Tacoma.

The northbound lanes separate near the Bridge of Glass, with one splitting into offramps serving South 15th Street and A Street, the latter of which is also served by a southbound onramp. I-705 then crosses under South 11th Street near the Murray Morgan Bridge and terminates at an onramp from South 9th Street adjacent to Fireman's Park, which cantilevers over the southbound lanes. The freeway continues northwest onto Schuster Parkway, with a separate set of flyover ramps that end at an at-grade intersection with Stadium Way near the Old City Hall.

As a component of the Interstate Highway System, the entirety of I-705 is listed as part of the National Highway System, a national network of roads identified as important to the national economy, defense, and mobility; it is also part of the state government's Highway of Statewide Significance program, recognizing its connection to major communities. The freeway is maintained by the Washington State Department of Transportation (WSDOT), which conducts an annual survey of traffic volume that is expressed in terms of annual average daily traffic. Average traffic volumes on the highway in 2020 ranged from a minimum of 26,000 vehicles at its southern terminus to a maximum of 62,000 vehicles between I-5 and SR 509.

== History ==
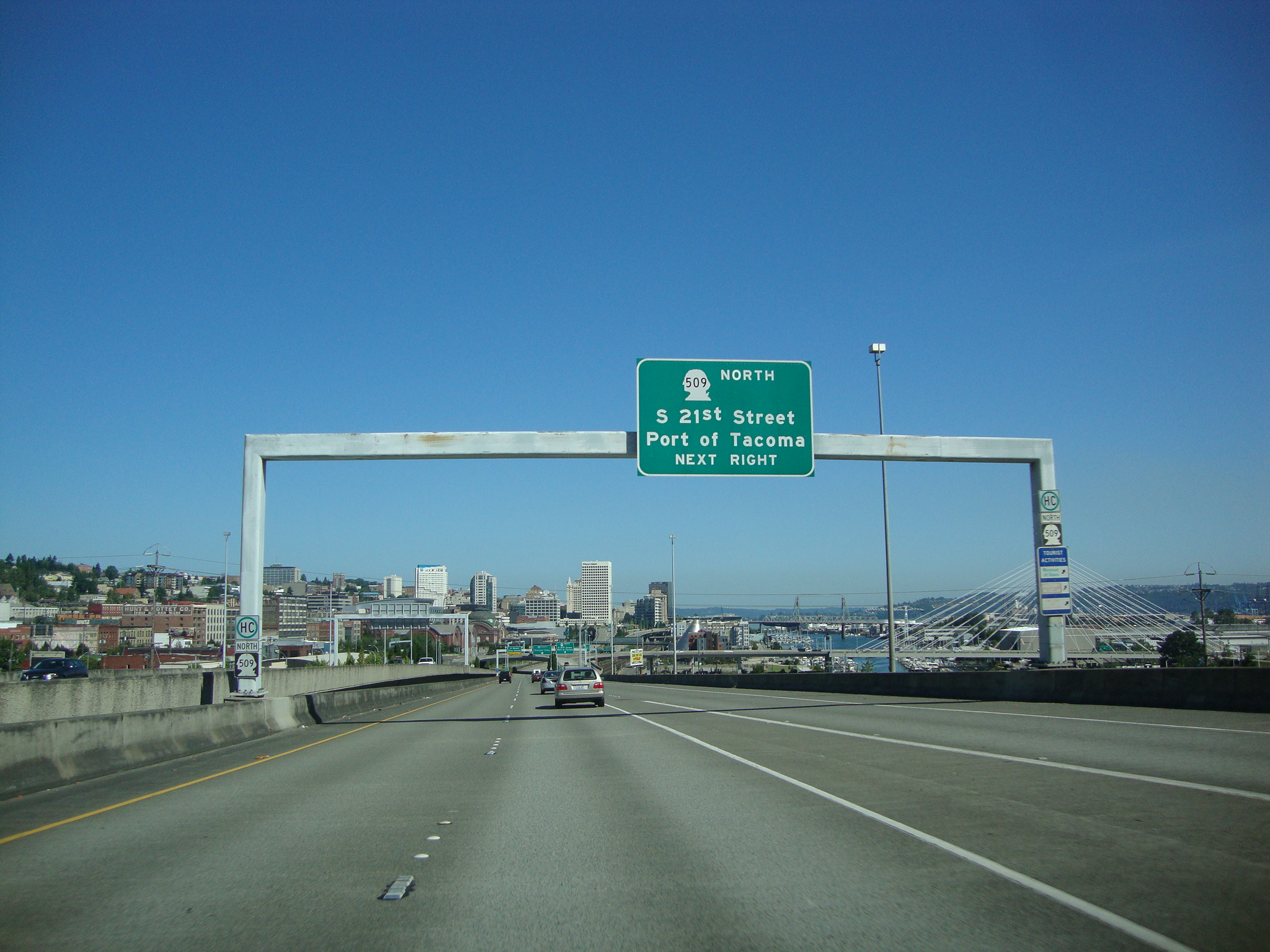
I-705 northbound approaching SR 509

The state government's plans for a regional tollway connecting Tacoma to Seattle and Everett in the early 1950s included a bypass of Downtown Tacoma with several connecting interchanges. The plan later formed the basis of I-5, which would be constructed using funds from the Federal-Aid Highway Act of 1956 instead of requiring a toll. In 1957, city officials from Tacoma proposed the construction of a downtown connector that would travel north from the Pacific Avenue interchange on I-5 (where SR 7 terminates) and improve vehicular access to the central business district. A route along A Street was selected for preliminary studies of either an elevated freeway or one-way couplet.

The opening of the Tacoma Mall along I-5 in 1965 caused a reduction in the number of retailers in Downtown Tacoma, which remained only accessible via local streets from the freeway. The lost business, combined with worsening congestion in Downtown Tacoma, prompted downtown retailers to ask the state government for an improved connection to I-5. The state Department of Highways had advanced their study into a downtown connector as part of SR 509 that would become an eventual freeway link. In 1968, the Department of Highways adopted the routing of a freeway into Downtown Tacoma along the western side of the City Waterway, to be constructed over railroad right of way. The project, then part of a new freeway corridor for State Route 509 through the Port of Tacoma, was approved by the Tacoma City Council in 1971, but further planning was suspended at the time due to funding issues.

In 1978, the American Association of State Highway and Transportation Officials (AASHTO) approved the designation of the Tacoma Spur as I-705. The Federal Highway Administration had tentatively numbered the route as "Interstate 105", but the Washington State Department of Transportation had requested the use of "705" as it would not conflict with SR 105, an existing highway. The Washington State Legislature approved the addition of I-705 into the state highway system in April 1979.

While funding was identified in the 1970s, construction on the freeway was not completed until the next decade because of federal budget cuts. Construction began with a groundbreaking on July 26, 1982, for the first portion of the Tacoma Spur, a ramp connecting I-5 to the Tacoma Dome area. The offramp connecting southbound I-5 to East 26th Street was dedicated on April 21, 1983, a day before the Tacoma Dome opened to the public. Construction on the rest of I-705 began in 1983; it required the demolition of the Union Station concourse shortly after passenger trains were rerouted to a new Amtrak station in 1984.

The northbound lanes of I-705 between South 22nd and South 13th streets opened on October 27, 1986, and was followed in August 1987 by a connection to Schuster Parkway. The freeway was dedicated on October 17, 1988, with a parade and ribbon-cutting; I-705 cost $102.3 million to construct and was the last new Interstate to be completed in the state of Washington. The Tacoma City Council in 1992 proposed to name the freeway Martin Luther King Way, however that name was finally applied to nearby K Street. Work on the single-point urban interchange, costing $29.4 million (equivalent to $57 million in 2024), was completed in 1993 to accommodate the changes that were made to SR 509 through Tacoma.

== Exit list ==
The entire highway is in Tacoma, Pierce County. All exits are unnumbered.

mi	km	Destinations	Notes
0.00	0.00	I-5 / SR 7 south – Seattle, Portland, Mount Rainier	Southern terminus; roadway continues as SR 7
0.08	0.13	East 26th Street – Tacoma Dome	Northbound exit and southbound entrance
0.72	1.16	SR 509 north / South 21st Street – Port of Tacoma	
1.15	1.85	A Street – Tacoma City Center	Northbound exit and southbound entrance; exit includes direct ramp to South 15th Street
1.43	2.30	South 9th Street	Southbound entrance only
1.50	2.41	Stadium Way / Commerce Street	Northbound exit and southbound entrance
1.50	2.41	Schuster Parkway	Northern terminus
1.000 mi = 1.609 km; 1.000 km = 0.621 mi: Incomplete access
