= Murray Morgan Bridge =

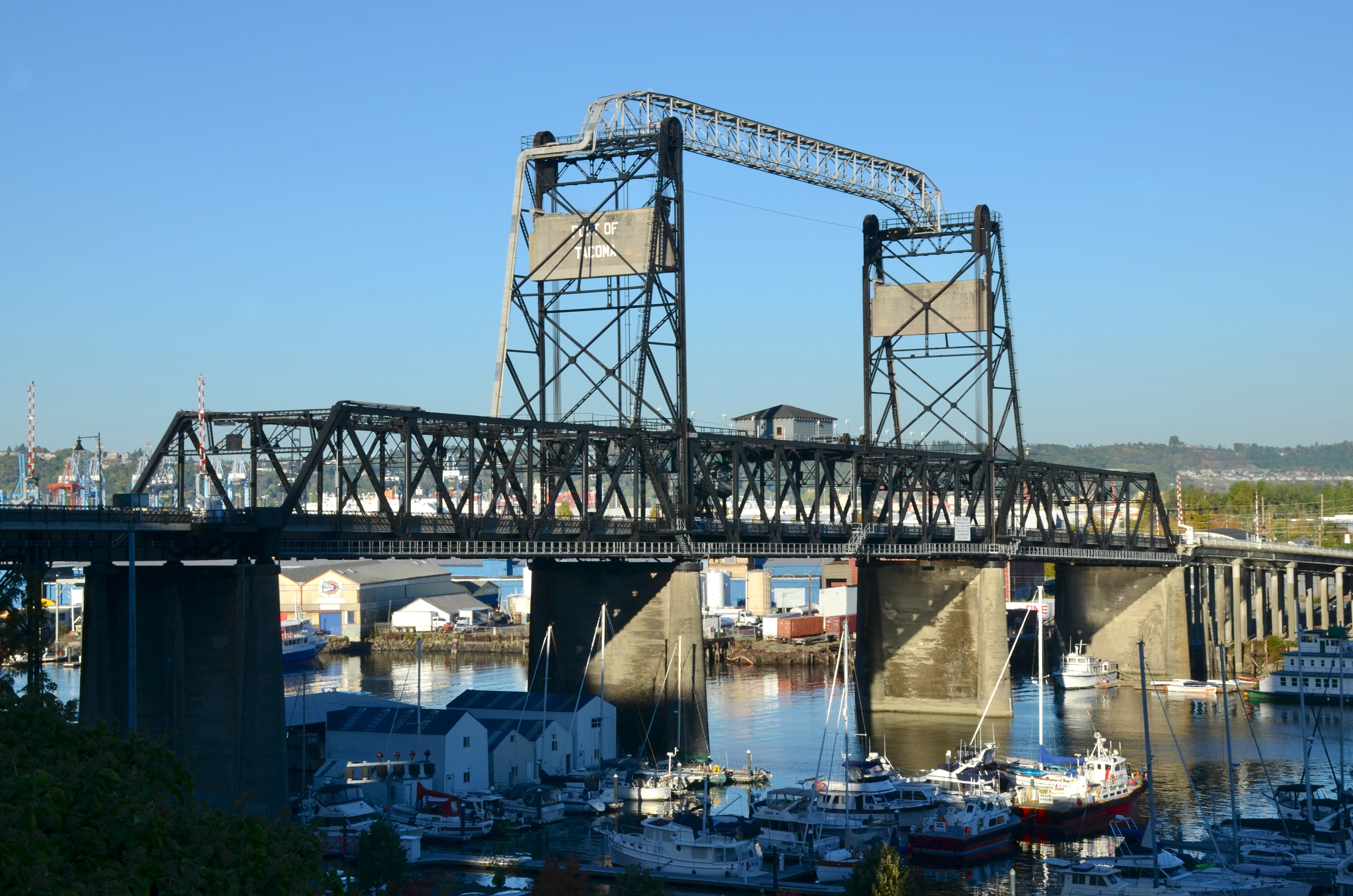
- Murray Morgan Bridge from the southwest, 2023
- Coordinates: 47°15′14″N 122°26′01″W
- Carries: Pedestrians, cyclists, and vehicles via 11th Street
- Crosses: Thea Foss Waterway (Navigable; 200 feet (61 m))
- Locale: Tacoma, Washington
- Other name: City Waterway Bridge
- Owner: City of Tacoma

Characteristics
- Design: Vertical-lift
- Material: Steel
- Total length: 3,200 feet (980 m)
- Width: 70 feet (21 m)
- Longest span: 214 feet (65 m)
- No. of spans: 3
- Clearance below: 60 feet (18 m) closed 135 feet (41 m) open
- No. of lanes: 2

History
- Designer: Waddell & Harrington
- Constructed by: International Contract Company
- Construction start: 1911
- Opened: February 15, 1913
- City Waterway Bridge
- U.S. National Register of Historic Places
- NRHP reference No.: 82004278
- Added to NRHP: July 16, 1982

Location
- Interactive map of Murray Morgan Bridge

The Murray Morgan Bridge, also known as the 11th Street Bridge or City Waterway Bridge, is a vertical-lift bridge in Tacoma, Washington. It originally opened February 15, 1913, to replace an 1894 swing-span bridge. The bridge connects downtown with the tidal flats, it spans the Thea Foss Waterway, originally known as the City Waterway. Designed by noted bridge engineering firm Waddell & Harrington, the bridge has some unusual features: higher above the water than most lift bridges, construction on a variable grade and an overhead span designed to carry a water pipe. The bridge structure also contained a series of switchback ramps that connected what is now Cliff Street with Dock Street. According to the Department of Transportation, the towers are 207 feet 1.75 inches (63.1381 m) above the water, with the road deck 60 feet (18 m) above the water level at zero tide. It was modified and updated in 1957 and was used to route State Route 509 through the tidal flats. The bridge was bypassed in the late 1990s when State Route 509 was routed around the edge of the tidal flats (see East 21st Street Bridge). While WSDOT wanted to tear down the bridge, the City of Tacoma convinced the state to transfer ownership to the City. In the past, the bridge has been heavily used by commuters and emergency services in connecting the Port of Tacoma with downtown Tacoma.

In 2007, the bridge was closed because of safety concerns and the general wear and tear that the bridge had suffered in its near 100-year lifespan. Soon afterwards, the city began a large rehabilitation project to completely overhaul all aspects of the bridge. In 2010, the bridge began periodically opening to bikes and pedestrians. In February 2013, the bridge re-opened to all traffic.

== Name ==
Originally known as the 11th Street Bridge, it was renamed May 21, 1997, to honor Tacoma-born Murray Morgan (1916–2000), the best-known Pacific Northwest historian of his generation, and author of "Skid Road", a history of Seattle, Washington. Morgan was a bridge tender on the bridge during the 1950s. In fact, he wrote most of "Skid Road" during quiet periods on the job.

== Closure ==
The bridge was officially closed to vehicles on October 23, 2007, due to "life safety concerns". The bridge re-opened February 2013 after a large rehabilitation project.

== Opening ==
On February 1, 2013, the bridge re-opened after a large rehabilitation project was completely finished. Down from four lanes to two, the bridge is now solid black (its original color) and features antique-esque lighting (actually LED bulbs) to celebrate the bridge's centennial anniversary. The outer two lanes were converted to larger pedestrian paths and bike lanes. An elevator connects pedestrians and bikes to Dock Street below the bridge. The bridge's environmental impact has been lessened; a new water runoff system routes rainwater to tanks that contribute to a rain garden on the east side of the bridge. The computers, cables, and motors that operate the lift in the center of the structure were also updated.

== Damage ==
On December 15, 2010, it was discovered that thieves had broken into the mechanical room and stolen wiring from the control panel used to raise the bridge for ship traffic on the Foss Waterway. As part of the rehabilitation project, the computers and electrics in the bridge were replaced.

== See also ==
- List of bridges documented by the Historic American Engineering Record in Washington (state)
