= Des Moines Memorial Drive =

Road in King County, Washington, US

- Living Road of Remembrance
- Former name: High Line Road
- Location: King County, Washington
- From: Marine View Drive in Des Moines
- To: South 188th Street / SR 509

Other
- Known for: American elms planted in memory of soldiers killed in World War I
- Website: Official website

Des Moines Memorial Drive, also known locally as the Living Road of Remembrance, is a road in southern King County, Washington, noted for its large numbers of American elm trees planted as a memorial to soldiers killed in World War I.

== Route description ==
Des Moines Memorial Drive traces a path through the middle of the region of King County informally known as Highline, beginning in downtown Des Moines at Marine View Drive. It continues approximately north through SeaTac and Burien to South 188th Street, then turns west and becomes part of SR 509. At Ambaum Boulevard and Normandy Road it turns north again and heads approximately northeast through Boulevard Park and becomes 14th Avenue South at SR 99 and the city boundary of Seattle.

== History ==
Originally called the High Line Road, or sometimes the Des Moines Road, the road was a major thoroughfare between Seattle and Tacoma and was thought at the time to be more important than the more well-known Pacific Highway a few miles to the east.

== War memorial ==
On November 11, 1921, members of the Seattle Garden Club, led by Lillian Gustin McEwan, planted 25 trees along the road, intending to establish it as a war memorial. Eventually 1,432 elms were planted, representing the number of soldiers from Washington State killed in the war.

== Decline and Restoration ==
Over the years most of the trees were stricken by Dutch elm disease and eventually succumbed to radical pruning and aging. King County is undertaking a project to restore and enhance the memorial.
