= Washington State Route 599 =

State highway in King County, Washington, US

State Route 599

- Map of King County in western Washington with SR 599 highlighted in red

Route information
- Auxiliary route of I-5
- Maintained by WSDOT
- Length: 1.75 mi (2.82 km)
- Existed: 1971–present

Major junctions
- South end: I-5 in Tukwila
- North end: SR 99 in Tukwila

Location
- Country: United States
- State: Washington
- County: King

Highway system
- State highways in Washington; Interstate; US; State; Scenic; Pre-1964; 1964 renumbering; Former
← SR 548	→ SR 702

State Route 599 (SR 599) is a state highway and freeway in King County, Washington, United States. It is located entirely within the city of Tukwila and travels 1.75 miles (2.82 km) northwest along the Duwamish River between junctions with Interstate 5 (I-5) and SR 99. The freeway has one intermediate exit and follows the Link light rail 1 Line.

== Route description ==
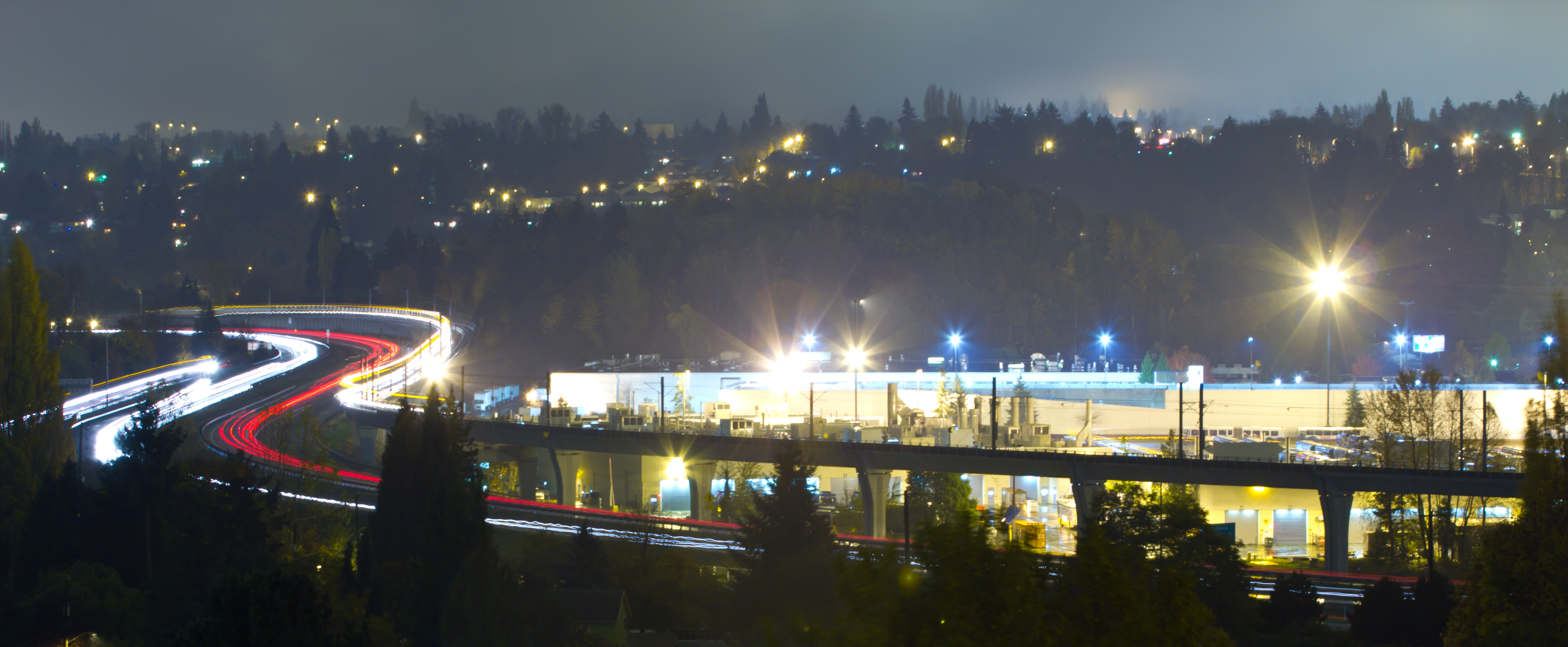
Traffic on SR 599 after dark

SR 599 is 1.75 miles (2.82 km) long and travels on a four-lane freeway located entirely within the city of Tukwila in suburban King County. It begins at a Y interchange with I-5 near Foster Memorial Park, approximately 1.4 miles (2.3 km) north of the Southcenter Mall and the terminus of Interstate 405. The interchange lacks connections to the north side of I-5, which are provided by the parallel Interurban Avenue, and has a direct offramp to the high-occupancy vehicle lanes on southbound I-5. The only intermediate junction on SR 599 is a partial cloverleaf interchange at South 133rd Street near several office parks, including the headquarters of BECU.

The freeway then travels northwest, following the elevated Central Link light rail tracks to the west and the Duwamish River and the Green River Trail to the east. SR 599 then turns west to travel around a King County Metro bus base, which has a direct onramp to the southbound freeway, and crosses under the light rail tracks at East Marginal Way South. The freeway turns west and intersects Tukwila International Boulevard, which marks the end of SR 599 and where SR 99 resumes. SR 99 continues northwest along the freeway and into Seattle on West Marginal Way.

SR 599 is maintained by the Washington State Department of Transportation (WSDOT) and is designated as a minor route of the National Highway System. WSDOT conducts an annual survey of average traffic volume on the state highway system that is measured in terms of annual average daily traffic, finding in 2016 that approximately 44,000 vehicles use SR 599.

== History ==
SR 599 became a state highway in 1971, but had been part of Washington's older highway system (Primary and Secondary Highways) from 1957 to 1970. The highway, then known as PSH 1 WM, or West Marginal Branch, was built during the 1960s. When it was completed and opened to traffic in June 1968, U.S. Route 99 (US 99) was about to be removed from the system, so when I-5 was completed up to Tukwila, US 99 switched to the route of SR 599. Later on, the current route of SR 599 became known as US 99T (Temporary) and later SR 99T in 1964. In 1971, the highway became SR 599. SR 181 was temporarily routed alongside the freeway on Interurban Avenue until 1971.

== Exit list ==
The entire route is in Tukwila, King County.

mi	km	Destinations	Notes
0.00	0.00	I-5 to I-405 – Portland	Southbound exit and northbound entrance
0.36	0.58	South 133rd Street / Interurban Avenue – Tukwila	
0.83	1.34	King County Metro South Base	Southbound entrance only
1.75	2.82	SR 99 north / Tukwila International Boulevard – Seattle	Continues north as SR 99
1.000 mi = 1.609 km; 1.000 km = 0.621 mi: Incomplete access
