= First Avenue South Bridge =

Highway drawbridge in Seattle, Washington, United States

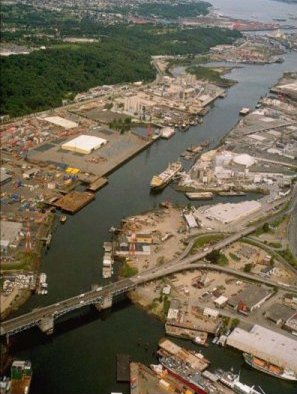
- The original First Avenue South Bridge over the Duwamish, before the construction of the southbound span
- Coordinates: 47°32′32″N 122°20′04″W
- Carries: SR 99
- Crosses: Duwamish River
- Locale: Seattle, Washington

Characteristics
- Design: Bascule bridge
- Total length: 3,010 ft (920 m) (northbound); 2,895 ft (882 m) (southbound)

History
- Opened: 1956 (northbound); 1997 (southbound)

Location
- Interactive map of First Avenue South Bridge

The First Avenue South Bridge is a pair of double-leaf bascule bridges built between 1956 and 1998 that carry State Route 99 over the Duwamish River about three miles (5 km) south of downtown Seattle, Washington.

The present day northbound span was built in 1956 to connect the industrial areas northeast of the Duwamish to the residential neighborhoods to the south and southwest. Between 1996 and 1998, the drawspan was retrofitted and the approaches completely demolished and rebuilt. The southbound span opened in February 1997 and carried traffic in both directions for two years while the northbound span was rebuilt.

In 2001, the southbound span was damaged by the Nisqually earthquake, knocking its piers 3 inches out of alignment, and was closed briefly for repairs. The northbound bridge was partially closed in February 2026 after cracks in the steel deck gates were discovered during inspections and later fully closed to replace the damaged components.

From the original construction to February 1995 when the retrofit began, the First Ave S bridge had the highest motor vehicle accident rate in Washington state.
