= Port of Tacoma =

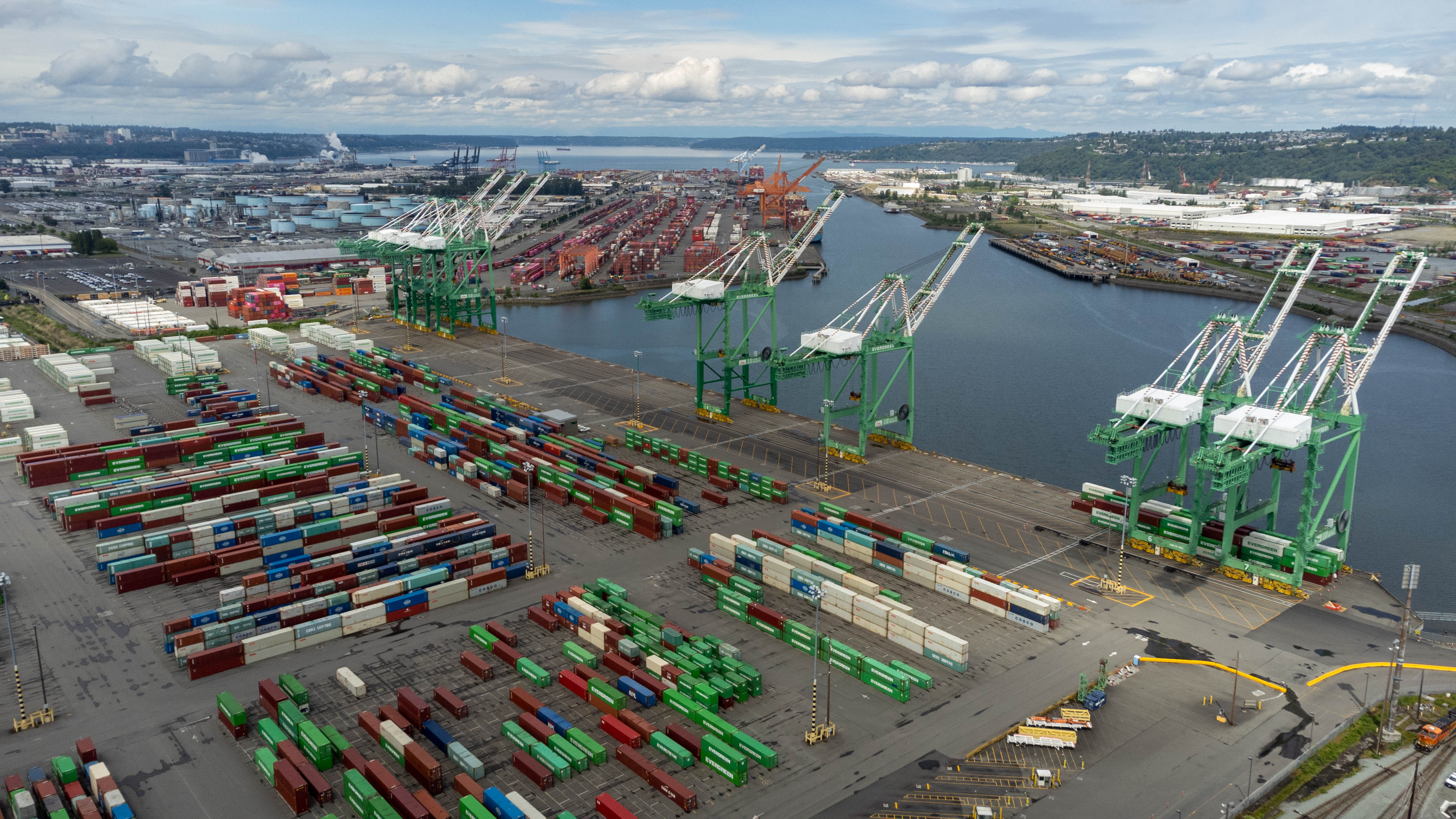
- Port of Tacoma in 2022
- Interactive map of Port of Tacoma

Location
- Country: United States
- Location: Tacoma, Washington
- Coordinates: 47°15′37″N 122°24′30″W

Details
- Opened: 1918
- Operated by: Port of Tacoma Commission
- Draft depth: >50 feet (15.24 m)
- Air draft: No restrictions

Statistics
- Website www.portoftacoma.com

The Port of Tacoma is an independent seaport in Tacoma, Washington. The port was created by a vote of Pierce County citizens on November 5, 1918. The port's marine cargo operations was merged with the Port of Seattle's in 2015 to form the Northwest Seaport Alliance. As of 2025, the port is the 6th busiest container port in North America and one of the 25 busiest in the world.

== History ==
The port started out on 240 acres (0.97 km^{2}) of land, and now owns more than 2,400 acres (972 hectares) of land that are used for shipping terminal activity, warehousing, distributing, and manufacturing. The Edmore was the first ship to call at the port in 1921.

=== Nineteenth Century ===
Prior to the establishment of the Port of Tacoma, much of Tacoma's shipping activity took place along Ruston Way and along the mouth of the Thea Foss Waterway, which opens into Commencement Bay and the larger Puget Sound. Tacoma's role as a shipping center dates to 1853, when the first cargo of lumber was shipped to San Francisco. Tacoma's status as a major trading hub was greatly strengthened by the 1873 decision by the Northern Pacific Railroad to establish its western terminus at Commencement Bay. Tacoma was chosen over other nearby cities such as Seattle for several reasons: Commencement Bay could dock more than 50 ships at a time, the harbor was deep enough for vessels of any draft, and there were miles of tideland waterfront available for expanded port facilities.

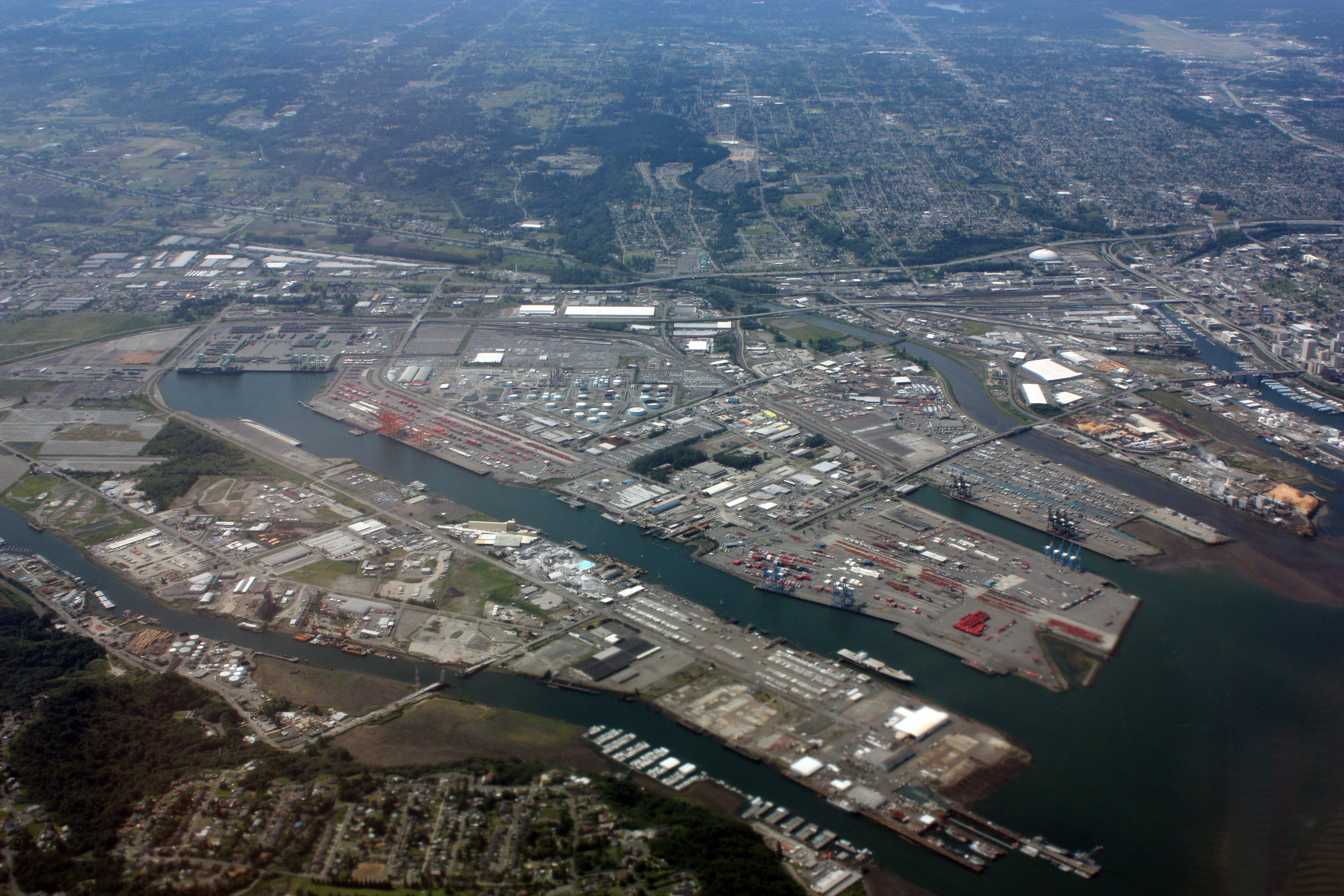
Port of Tacoma

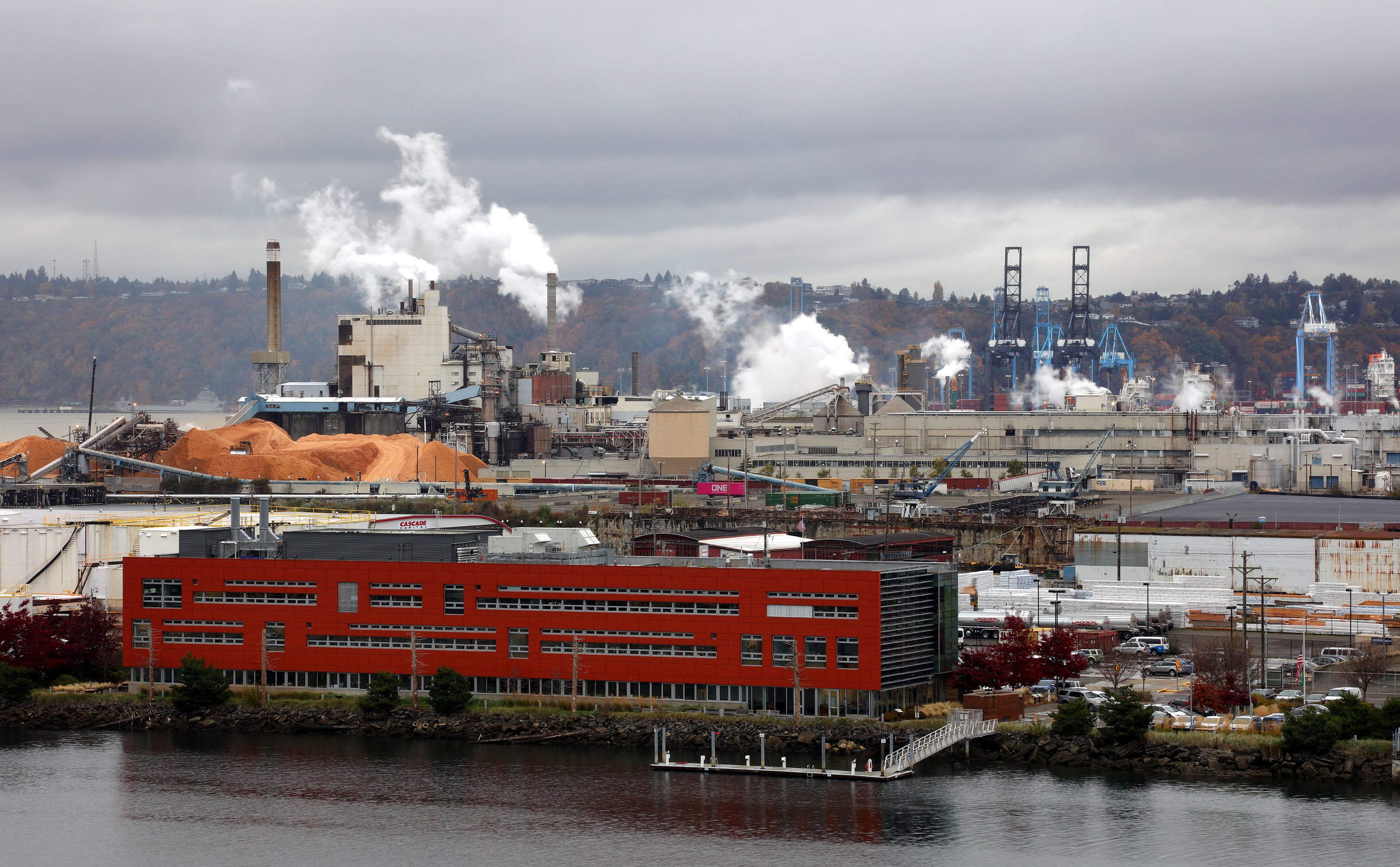
Port of Tacoma

=== Settlement with Puyallup Tribe ===
The United States Army Corps of Engineers straightened the Puyallup River between 1948 and 1950, leading to litigation in the early 1980s over ownership of 12 acres of land formerly in the riverbed. The Puyallup Indian Tribe won their case in federal court. Subsequently, The Puyallup Tribe of Indians Settlement Act of 1989 ceded the Tribe's remaining land claims over 120 acres of the Port of Tacoma, in exchange for $162 million and other benefits. The claims dated to the 1856 Medicine Creek Treaty and the Puyallup's 1856–1857 renegotiation of their reservation boundaries at Fox Island. The reservation still exists legally and includes at least the Port's land between Hylebos and Blair Waterways and the entire city of Fife.

=== Northwest Seaport Alliance ===
On October 7, 2014, the Port of Seattle and Port of Tacoma announced an agreement to "jointly market and operate the marine terminals of both ports as a single entity," though they were not merging. Joint operations began with the formation of the Northwest Seaport Alliance on August 4, 2015, creating the third-largest cargo gateway in the United States; by the end of the year, it reported more than 3.5 million twenty-foot equivalent units handled by the two ports, an increase of 4 percent.

== Operations ==
The port plays a large international trade role in the Pacific Northwest, and is a municipal corporation that operates under state-enabling legislation.

Each year, the port handles between about 9 and 13 million tons of cargo, and more than $25 billion of commerce. Major imports include automobiles, electronics, and toys, while major exports include grain, forest products, and agricultural products. Based on tonnage, the port's largest export is grain (corn and soybeans) that come into the port by rail from the Midwest.

In 2010, the Port of Tacoma's top trading partner, based on two-way trade value, was China/Hong Kong. China/Hong Kong was also the top partner ranked by volume imported and value imported. Japan was the top partner ranked by volume exported and value exported. The top commodities exported, by value, were cereals and grains. The top commodities imported, by value, were vehicles and parts, followed by industrial machinery and electronics.

The port is among the top ten largest container ports in North America. Containers hold everything from computers and lawn furniture to apples and frozen meat. Based on container volumes, China is the port's largest trading partner.

More than 70 percent of the containers imported through the port move by rail to markets in the Midwest and East Coast. The port is served by the BNSF Railway and Union Pacific railroads. Shortline rail service is provided by Tacoma Rail, which is owned by the City of Tacoma.

U.S. Oil and Refining operates an oil refinery in the Port of Tacoma. Oil tankers bring crude oil, which is refined into a variety of products, including JP-8 jet fuel for McChord Field Air Force base. The refinery and airbase are connected by a dedicated pipeline, McChord Pipeline.

== Pollution ==
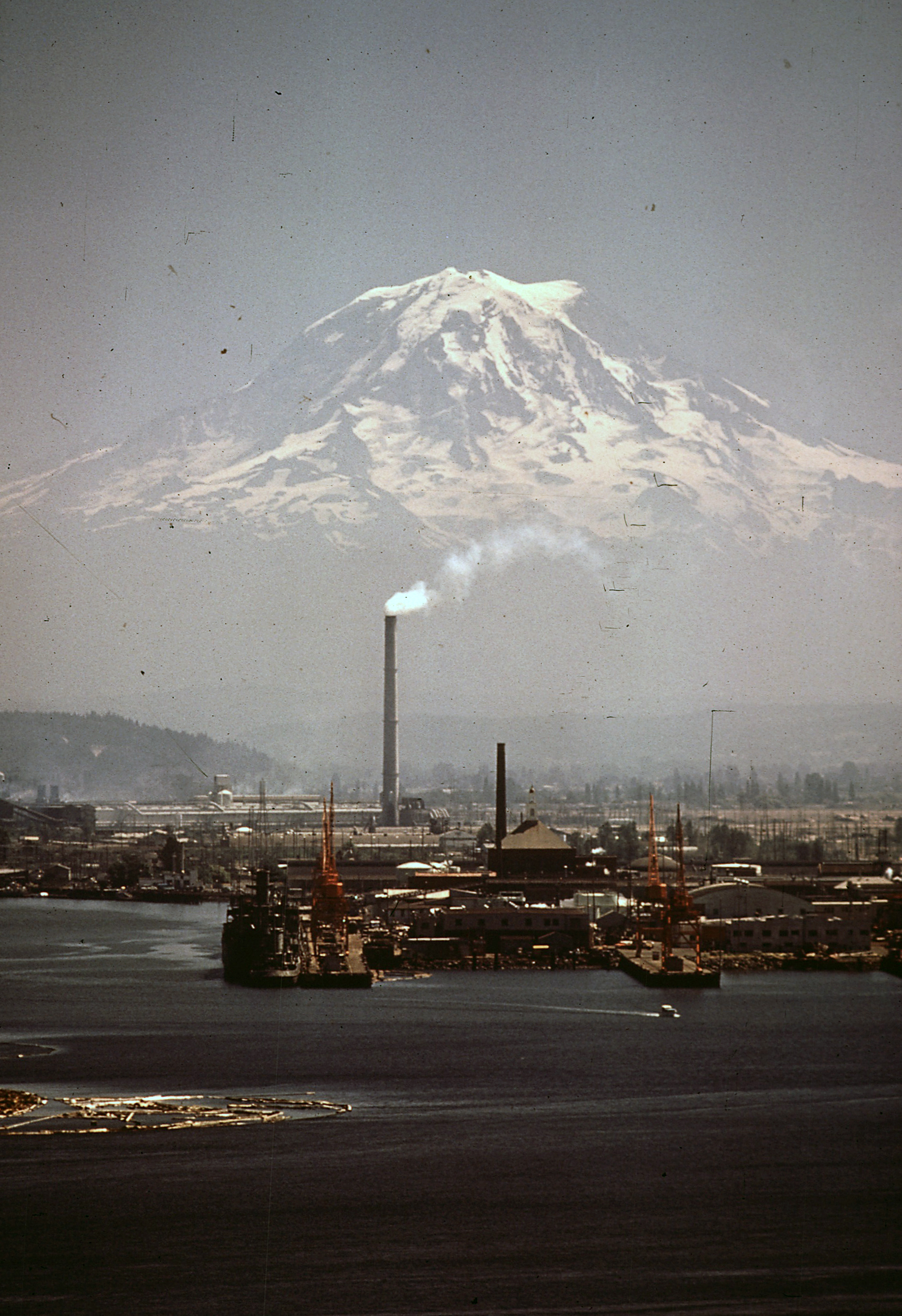
The Kaiser Aluminum plant, now part of the superfund site, in 1972.

The port is part of one of the largest superfund federal environmental remediation sites in Washington, the Commencement Bay Nearshore/Tideflats Site. The Port of Tacoma has been working with the United States Environmental Protection Agency (EPA) and the Washington State Department of Ecology on cleanup efforts at various sites within the larger superfund area.

== Facts ==
- Port activities are related to more than 43,000 jobs in Pierce County, and 113,000 jobs in Washington state.
- There are more than 70 public ports in the state of Washington.
- The port is sometimes called the "Gateway to Alaska", handling more than 70 percent of all waterborne commerce moving from the Lower 48 to Alaska by water.
- Over the last 20 years, the port has invested more than $160 million in projects designed to improve the environment in and around Commencement Bay.

== See also ==
- List of North American ports
- List of ports in the United States
- List of world's busiest container ports
- Port Militarization Resistance
- United States container ports
