= Thea Foss Waterway =

Harbor channel in Tacoma, Washington

- City Waterway
- Location within Washington (state) Location within the United States
- Location: Tacoma, Washington
- Coordinates: 47.2623214°N 122.4373462°W
- Type: Inlet
- Etymology: Thea Foss
- Part of: Commencement Bay

The Thea Foss Waterway, formerly the City Waterway, is a north–south inlet of Commencement Bay separating downtown Tacoma, Washington, from the Port of Tacoma.

== History ==
The City Waterway was created in 1902 through a dredging operation proposed by the Northern Pacific Railway and led by the U.S. Army Corps of Engineers. An existing inlet was widened to 500 feet (150 m) for that era's wheat ships and extended south, while a fork of the Puyallup River (now the Wheeler–Osgood Waterway) was severed. In 1989, the waterway was renamed to honor Thea Foss, who founded the Foss Maritime Company on the inlet in 1889.

== Cleanup and redevelopment ==
During the early 20th century, the Thea Foss Waterway was a thriving industrial center. Industry began to dwindle in the area, and by 1981, the Thea Foss Waterway was almost entirely abandoned. In 1983, the United States Environmental Protection Agency (EPA) listed the Thea Foss and Wheeler-Osgood waterways as part of the larger 12-acre (49,000 m^{2}) Commencement Bay Superfund site. The final cap from the Superfund cleanup action on the Thea Foss Waterway occurred back in February 2006. As of 2010, planned development is underway along the waterway. When complete, the new development will feature parks, residential areas, and office space. A public esplanade will run along the length of the waterway. 7 of the 15 development sites are either constructed or have specific plans for redevelopment. The project is overseen by the Foss Waterway Development Authority Board (FWDA).

Local leaders see the Thea Foss Waterway as an economic opportunity, and seek to restore it to the commercial hub that it once was.

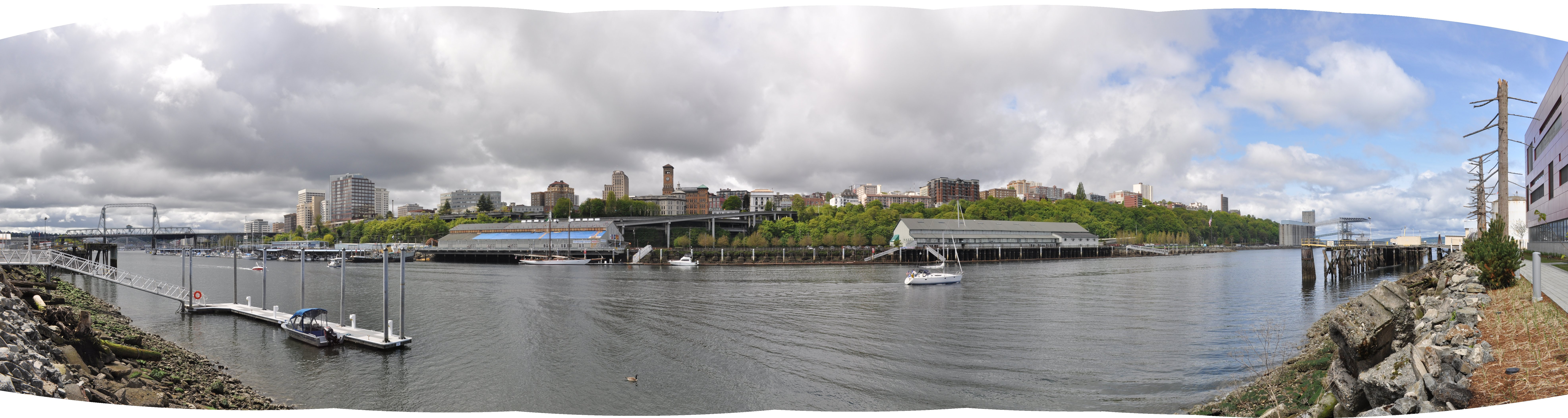
Northern portion of the Thea Foss Waterway, looking west across the waterway toward downtown Tacoma. The Murray Morgan Bridge is to the left. Commencement Bay is to the right.

== See also ==
- Puyallup River
- Hylebos Creek
