= Michael Hearst =

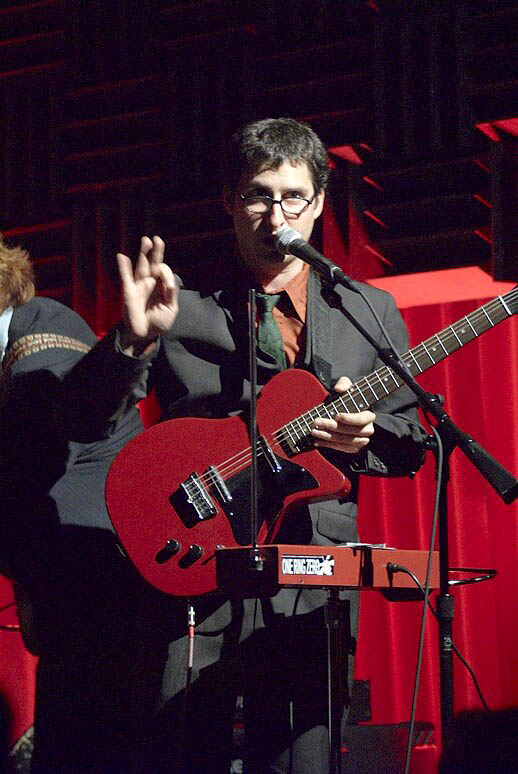
- Michael Hearst performing at Joe's Pub in New York, NY.

Background information
- Born: December 27, 1972 (age 53)
- Origin: Virginia Beach, Virginia, US
- Genres: Indie rock, Experimental, Children's, Film
- Occupations: Composer, musician, writer
- Instruments: Keyboards, Guitar, Vocals, Claviola, Theremin, Bass, Drums, Daxophone
- Years active: 1991 to present
- Labels: Planetary Records, Barbès, Bar/None Records, Urban Geek Records
- Website: michaelhearst.com

Michael Marcus Hearst (born December 27, 1972) is a Brooklyn-based American composer, multi-instrumentalist, and author known for his thematic, multi-media projects and use of unconventional instrumentation. He is a founding member of the eclectic indie band One Ring Zero and the creator of several book-and-album pairings, including the Unusual Creatures series and the multi-volume 80 From The 80s project. As a film composer, his work includes the scores for the documentaries To Be Takei, Chicken People, and Hunky Jesus.

== One Ring Zero ==
One Ring Zero was founded in 1997 by Michael Hearst and Joshua Camp. The groups works are often programmatic and/or collaborative. They include the album As Smart As We Are, featuring lyrics by Paul Auster, Margaret Atwood, Jonathan Lethem, A.M. Homes, Neil Gaiman, Rick Moody and Dave Eggers. The book/CD The Recipe Project is a collection of recipes set to music and sung word for word in the musical style suggested by the chefs, including Mario Batali, Chris Cosentino, Andrea Reusing, David Chang, John Besh, Mark Kurlansky, Michael Symon, and Isa Chandra Moskowitz. Planets is a collection of compositions representing the Solar System and beyond. Hearst says of Planets, "It had been just about 100 years since Holst had composed his song cycle The Planets. It seemed like it was time to musically revisit our solar system and come up with our own song cycle."

== Songs For Ice Cream Trucks ==
The 2007 album Songs For Ice Cream Trucks features original instrumental compositions designed as alternative music for ice cream trucks.

== Songs For Unusual Creatures ==
Hearst's album Songs For Unusual Creatures is the musical companion to his book Unusual Creatures. It is a collection of songs inspired by lesser-known animals, and includes works composed for Kronos Quartet, The Microscopic Septet, Margaret Leng Tan, and the League of Electronic Musical Urban Robots.

== Songs For Fearful Flyers ==
Songs For Fearful Flyers includes seven long-form instrumental compositions intended to calm nervous travelers. The album features a spoken word cameo from actress Whoopi Goldberg.

== Songs For Extraordinary People ==
In 2017 Hearst released Songs For Extraordinary People as a companion to his children's book Extraordinary People. The album features songs about Billie Jean King, Lawnchair Larry flight, Ibn Battuta, William Kamkwamba, Jeanne de Clisson, Roy Sullivan, and Marie Curie among others. Guest vocalists include Taylor Mac, Claudia Gonson, and Tanya Donelly.

== Songs For Curious Constructions ==
In 2019 Songs For Curious Constructions was released as a companion EP to Hearst's children's book Curious Constructions. The six-song album features compositions about Coney Island's Parachute Jump, Coral Castle, El Pulpo Mecanico, Finca Bellavista, and various Paul Bunyan statues.

== Songs For Unconventional Vehicles ==
Songs For Unconventional Vehicles (2021) is a companion to Hearst's children's book Unconventional Vehicles. The album features a miniature songs for all 45 entries in the book, which include Bertha (tunnel boring machine), Lockheed XFV, E-Ship 1, LZ 127 Graf Zeppelin, Hyperloop, De Lackner HZ-1 Aerocycle, and the Zamboni Ice resurfacer among others. Guest vocalists include Syd Straw, Neil Gaiman, and Tanya Donelly among others.

== 80 From The 80s ==
In the fall of 2024, Hearst began releasing a series of singles as part of his 80 From The 80s project. Over the course of the project, eighty songs will be released, featuring guest vocals from a variety of artists, including Martha Wainwright, Stephin Merritt, John Linnell, Jonathan Coulton, Eli "Paperboy" Reed, Krystle Warren, John Cameron Mitchell, Amber Martin, and Syd Straw.

== Other work ==
Hearst established Urban Geek Studios and Urban Geek Records, where he has produced, recorded, and worked on post-production for Guided by Voices, Tanya Donelly, Kansas, The Holy Modal Rounders, and Robert Creeley.

Hearst has performed and given lectures and workshops at universities, museums, and cultural centers around the world. He has also appeared on NPR's Fresh Air, A+E's Breakfast With The Arts, and NBC's The Today Show.

As a writer, Hearst's stories have appeared in literary journals such as McSweeney's Internet Tendency, Post Road, Parenthetical Note, The Lifted Brow, and The Muse Apprentice Guild. He wrote the non-fiction children's books Unusual Creatures, Extraordinary People, and Curious Constructions.

In 2008, Hearst toured with The Magnetic Fields as their support act, reading flash-non-fiction stories, and performing selections from Songs For Newsworthy News.

In April 2009, Hearst performed Terry Riley's Concert in C alongside the Kronos Quartet, Philip Glass, Dave Douglas, Osvaldo Golijov, Morton Subotnick, and many others at Carnegie Hall in New York City.

Hearst began co-writing music with Tanya Donelly in 2010 for her album Swan Song Series, and in October 2011 performed with her at concerts in New York City and Boston, along with Rick Moody, Claudia Gonson, Hannah Marcus, Sam Davol, and Carrie Bradley.

On February 28, 2012, the Kronos Quartet performed the world premiere of Hearst's composition "Secret Word" at Zankel Hall. The work is a tribute to the late-1980s television series Pee-wee's Playhouse. For the debut performance, Hearst joined the quartet on stage, performing claviola, theremin, and daxophone, and also conducting a toy instrument orchestra of audience members who took the stage.

Hearst earned a degree in music composition from Virginia Commonwealth University in 1995, where he studied under Dika Newlin. In 2017 Hearst returned to VCU to deliver the commencement address to the graduating class of the School of the Arts. The commencement ceremony took place at the Altria Theater in Richmond, Virginia.

== Discography ==
=== Albums ===
- Schwa Footleg Room (1991) (Joe Lee Records)
- Schwa Phoney Karate (1992) (Joe Lee Records)
- Fashion Central Underwood (1994) (Brilliant Records)
- Maud Gonne Buff Silky (1996) (Urban Geek Records)
- Maud Gonne Bonus Songs (1997) (Urban Geek Records)
- Anon Anon (1998) (Urban Geek Records)
- One Ring Zero Tranz Party (1999) (Planetary Records)
- One Ring Zero Alice (2001) (Urban Geek Records)
- One Ring Zero Interludes and Out-takes from The Pumpkin Pie Show (2001) (Urban Geek Records)
- One Ring Zero Memorandum (2002) (Urban Geek Records)
- One Ring Zero As Smart As We Are (2004) (Soft Skull Press)
- Rick Moody and One Ring Zero Rick Moody and One Ring Zero (2004) (Isota Records)
- One Ring Zero New York Spleen (2005) (Naïve Records-France)
- Sophie Auster Sophie Auster (2005) (Actes Sud / Naïve Records)
- One Ring Zero As Smart As We Are (2006) (Barbes Records)
- One Ring Zero Wake Them Up (2006) (Barbes Records)
- One Ring Zero Wake Them Up (2007) (Moor Works-Japan)
- Michael Hearst Songs For Ice Cream Trucks (2007) (Urban Geek Records/Bar-None Records)
- Beat Circus Dreamland (2008) (Cuneiform Records)
- One Ring Zero Live At Barbes (2008) (Barbes Records)
- One Ring Zero Ten Years Of Extra Stuff (2009) (Urban Geek Records)
- One Ring Zero Planets (2010) (Moor Works-Japan)
- One Ring Zero Planets (2010) (Urban Geek Records)
- One Ring Zero As Smart As We Are (2010) (Moor Works-Japan)
- One Ring Zero The Recipe Project (2011) (Urban Geek Records / Black Balloon Publishing)
- Michael Hearst Songs For Unusual Creatures (2012) (Urban Geek Records)
- Michael Hearst To Be Takei (Original Motion Picture Soundtrack) (2014) (Urban Geek Records)
- Michael Hearst Songs For Fearful Flyers (2014) (Urban Geek Records)
- Michael Hearst Songs For Extraordinary People (2017) (Urban Geek Records)
- Michael Hearst Songs For Unconventional Vehicles (2021) (Urban Geek Records)
- Mean Marcus Say Hello To The Party (2023) (Urban Geek Records)
- Michael Hearst 80 From The 80s, Vol. 1 (2025) (Urban Geek Records)
- Michael Hearst 80 From The 80s, Vol. 2 (2026) (Urban Geek Records)

=== EPs ===
- Schwa (1993) (Brilliant Records)
- Fashion Central (1995) (Spin Art Records)
- One Ring Zero "The Sirens of Red Hot (2004) (Isota Records)
- One Ring Zero and Rick Moody (2004) (Isota Records)
- Michael Hearst Songs For Curious Constructions EP (2019) (Urban Geek Records)

=== Film Scores ===
- Late Bloomer (2004) (dir. Craig Macneill) with One Ring Zero
- The Good Mother (2009) (dir. Sarah Klein)
- Nicht Lustig (2010) (dir. Gerd Schneider)
- The House of Suh (2010) (dir. Iris K. Shim)
- Magic Camp (2012) (dir. Judd Ehrlich)
- Kate Bornstein is a Queer and Pleasant Danger (2013) (dir. Sam Feder)
- To Be Takei (2014) (dir. Jennifer M. Kroot)
- Chicken People (2016) (dir. Nicole Lucas Haimes)
- The Untold Tales of Armistead Maupin (2017) (dir. Jennifer M. Kroot)
- The Good, The Bad, The Hungry (2019) (dir. Nicole Lucas Haimes)

=== Books ===
- As Smart As We Are (2004) (Soft Skull Press)
- New York Spleen (2005) (Naïve Records-France)
- The Recipe Project (2011) (Black Balloon Publishing)
- Unusual Creatures (2012) (Chronicle Books)
- Extraordinary People (2015) (Chronicle Books)
- Curious Constructions (2017) (Chronicle Books)
- Unconventional Vehicles (2021) (Chronicle Books)
- Insect Anatomy with Julia Rothman (2025) (Storey Publishing)

=== Video ===
- One Ring Zero "Addendum" (2005) (music video collection)
- As subject One Ring Zero "As Smart As They Are" (2006) (documentary film)
- Songs For Unusual Creatures (2013–2014) (PBS Digital) 10-episode series.
1. "The Aye-aye" (pilot episode)
2. "The Jesus Christ Lizard"
3. "The Elephant Shrew"
4. "The Giant Anteater"
5. "The Glass Frog"
6. "The Magnapinna Squid"
7. "The Blobfish"
8. "The Sea Pig"
9. "The Tardigrade"
10. "The Chinese Giant Salamander"
11. "The Bilby"
