= One Ring Zero =

- One Ring Zero Joshua Camp and Michael Hearst

Background information
- Origin: Richmond, Virginia; Brooklyn, New York, United States
- Genres: Indie rock Art rock World; Baroque pop
- Years active: 1998–2015
- Labels: Urban Geek Record, Planetary Records, Barbes Records
- Members: Michael Hearst; Joshua Camp
- Past members: Greg Stare; Paul Watson; Mark Snyder; Taylor Bergren-Chrisman; Timothy Quigley; Ian Riggs; Ben Holmes; John Gotschalk; Randy Mendicino; Josh Roseman; Lee Epstein; Matt Grason; Sean Moran; Anthony Mascorro; Scot Fitzsimmons; Karen Waltuch
- Website: oneringzero.com

One Ring Zero is a modern music group led by Joshua Camp and Michael Hearst that melds many genres and sounds to create a unique type of music.

== Instruments ==
Hearst plays the theremin and guitar, and Camp plays the accordion and piano. They both play the claviola and prove to be extremely versatile musicians, often switching instruments for each song. Other instruments include a toy piano, a melodica, a metallophone, jones-O-phone, cajón and a series of everyday sounds looped and altered to create textures and rhythms. Using all these instruments (or noises) together One Ring Zero creates a sound that defies genre. There is an undeniable klezmer influence throughout their music but also a modern rock or indie influence. The band has been denoted "Lit Rock" by the media but they seem to defy any singular name. Both Hearst and Camp sing, Hearst bass and Camp tenor. They often perform as a five-piece band, including trumpet, drum kit, and bass guitar.

== Appearances ==
One Ring Zero on NPR's "Fresh Air" (2004).

One Ring Zero on A&E Television's "Breakfast with the Arts" (2007).

One Ring Zero's on NPR's "Morning Edition" (2007).

One Ring Zero has also performed at music venues and cultural institutions including the Whitney Museum of Art, Central Park SummerStage, The Kennedy Center, Toronto's Harbourfront Centre, Spring Scream in Taiwan, Era in Tokyo, New Morning in Paris, The Chicago World Music Festival, and the Fundación Príncipe de Asturias in Spain.

== As Smart As We Are (aka The Author Project) ==
On their critically acclaimed album As Smart As We Are, published authors and writers wrote lyrics on request, which Hearst and Camp then set to music. Some writers wrote basic chord progressions or requested a certain genre for their song to fall under but for the most part Michael and Joshua wrote their own music for the lyrics.

Track list and contributing author.

- 1. "Introduction"
- 2. "Natty Man Blues" - lyrics by Paul Auster
- 3. "Radio" - lyrics by Daniel Handler
- 4. "We Both Have A Feeling You Still Want Me" - lyrics by Darin Strauss
- 5. "Kiss Me, You Brat" - lyrics by Rick Moody - vocals by Allyssa Lamb
- 6. "Deposition Disposition" - lyrics by Lawrence Krauser
- 7. "Half And Half" - lyrics by Clay McLeod Chapman - vocals by Hanna Cheek
- 8. "The Ghost Of Rita Gonzolo" - lyrics by Dave Eggers
- 9. "Frankenstein Monster Song" - lyrics by Margaret Atwood
- 10. "Honku" - lyrics by Aaron Naparstek
- 11. "Blessing" - lyrics by Denis Johnson
- 12. "On The Wall" - lyrics by Neil Gaiman
- 13. "All About House Plants" - lyrics by Amy Fusselman
- 14. "Golem" - lyrics by Myla Goldberg - vocals by Syd Straw
- 15. "Snow" - lyrics by A.M. Homes
- 16. "Nothing Else Is Happening" - lyrics by Ben Greenman - vocals by F.A. Blasco
- 17. "The Story Of The Hairy Call" - lyrics by Jonathan Ames
- 18. "Water" - lyrics by Jonathan Lethem

== Planets ==
For One Ring Zero's 2010 release, Planets, the band composed thirteen new songs to represent the Solar System and beyond. Tracks on the album include "An Introduction To Planets," "Mercury," "Venus," "Earth," "Mars Part I," "Mars Part II," "Jupiter," "63 Moons," "Saturn," "Uranus," "Neptune," "Pluto," and "Exoplanets." The concept was inspired by Gustav Holst's nearly century-old orchestral suite "The Planets." As Hearst and Camp put it, "Seemed like maybe it was time to revisit our solar system with some new tunes.”

== The Recipe Project ==
The Recipe Project is a CD-book combo released in 2011 that was the result of a collaboration between One Ring Zero and celebrity chefs including David Chang, Isa Chandra Moskowitz, Chris Cosentino, and Tom Colicchio, among others. The recipes are sung word for word, as song lyrics, and as an added bonus, the band asked each chef what kind of genre of music they would prefer their recipe be sung as. Edible Brooklyn called the CD "A feast for the ears." Time (magazine) wrote "Every once in a while you come across a project and think, I can't believe no one has done this before."

== Discography ==
=== Albums ===
- One Ring Zero "Tranz Party” (1999) (Planetary Records)
- One Ring Zero "Alice” (2001) (Urban Geek Records)
- One Ring Zero "Interludes and Out-takes from The Pumpkin Pie Show” (2001) (Urban Geek Records)
- One Ring Zero "Memorandum” (2002) (Urban Geek Records)
- One Ring Zero "As Smart As We Are” (2004) (Soft Skull Press)
- One Ring Zero and Rick Moody (2004) (Isota Records)
- One Ring Zero "New York Spleen” French Edition (2005) (Naïve Records)
- Sophie Auster (2005) (Actes Sud / Naïve Records)
- One Ring Zero "As Smart As We Are” Deluxe Edition with DVD (2006) (Barbes Records)
- One Ring Zero "Wake Them Up” (2006) (Barbes Records)
- One Ring Zero "Wake Them Up" Japanese Edition (2007) (MoorWorks)
- One Ring Zero "Live at Barbes" (2008) (Barbes Records)
- One Ring Zero “Ten Years Of Extra Stuff” (2009) (Urban Geek Records)
- One Ring Zero "Planets" (2010) (Urban Geek Records)
- One Ring Zero "Planets" Japanese Edition (2010) (MoorWorks)
- One Ring Zero "As Smart As We Are" Japanese Edition (2010) (MoorWorks)
- One Ring Zero "The Recipe Project" (2011) (Black Balloon)

=== EPs ===
- One Ring Zero “The Sirens of Red Hot” (2004) (Isota Records)
- One Ring Zero and Rick Moody (2004) (Isota Records)

=== Video ===
- One Ring Zero “Addendum” (2005) (Urban Geek Records)
- As the subject of “As Smart As They Are - The Author Project” (2007)

== Notes and references ==
A documentary called As Smart As They Are: The Author Project was made about the duo. Directed by Joe Pacheco it shows the evolution of the album "As Smart As We Are".

The song "Radio" from the album As Smart As We Are was featured in an episode of the show Suburgatory. In the episode, titled "Sweet Sixteen." the band is depicted by a fictitious group called Average Shelflife.
