= The Recipe =

The Recipe may refer to:

- The Recipe (album), a 1998 album by Mack 10
- The Recipe (film), a 2010 South Korean film
- "The Recipe" (The Amazing World of Gumball), an episode of The Amazing World of Gumball
- "The Recipe" (Kendrick Lamar song), a 2012 song by Kendrick Lamar
- The Recipe, a 2009 album by Mambo Sauce
- "The Recipe", a song by 10 Years from the 2005 album The Autumn Effect
- "The Recipe", a song by JK-47 from the 2020 album Made for This
- "The Recipe", a song by Kodak Black from the 2017 album Project Baby 2
- "The Recipe", a song by Reks from the 2016 album The Greatest X

== See also ==
- Recipe, a set of instructions for preparing something, especially food
- The Recipe for Gertrude, an anime serialization
- The Recipe Project, a CD/book collaboration between chefs and musicians
