= Pioneer Square Habitat Beach =

Urban beach in Seattle, Washington, U.S.

- Beach
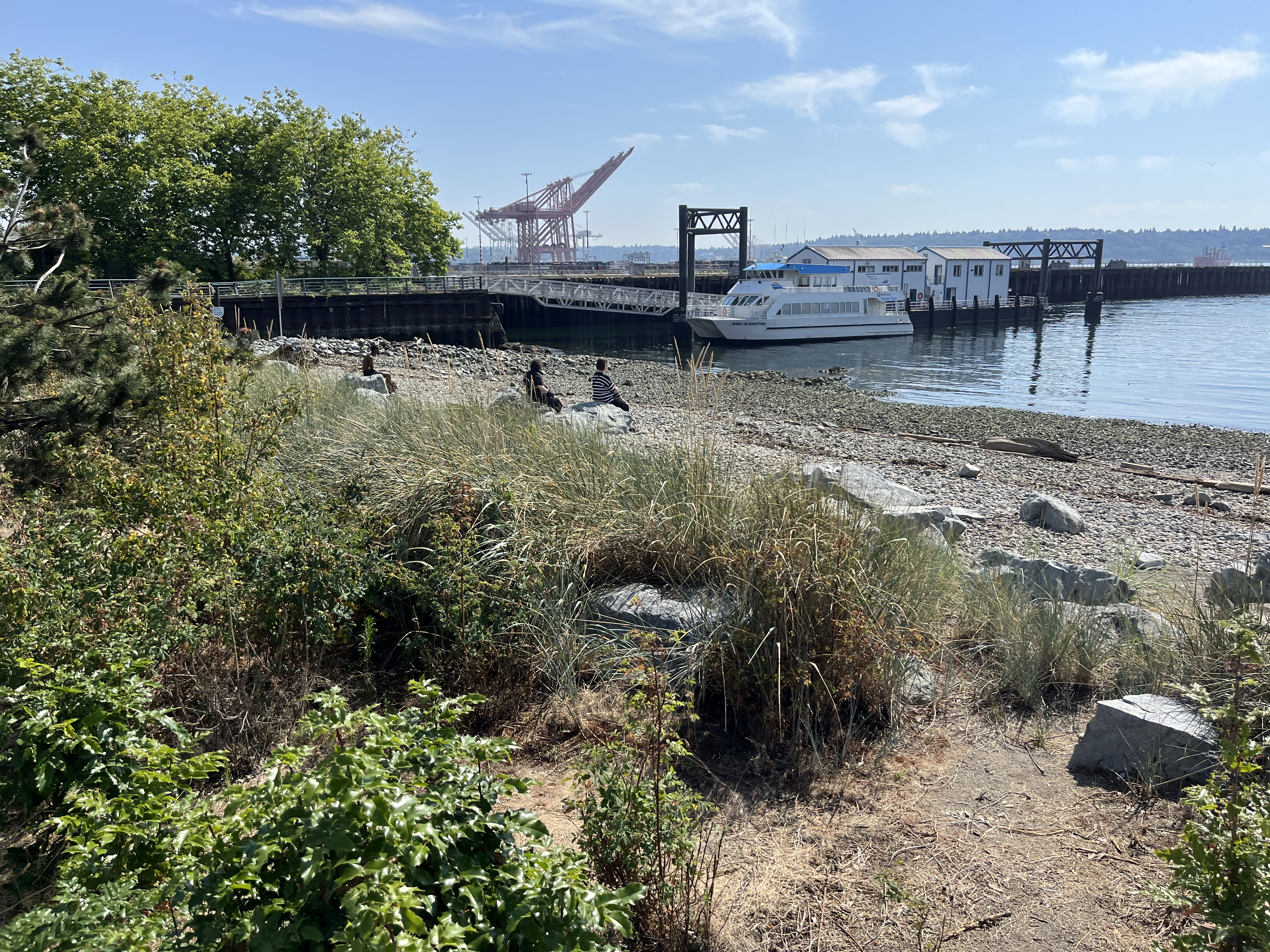
- The beach in 2023

- Coordinates: 47°36′4.5″N 122°20′11.5″W
- Location: Seattle, Washington, U.S.

Pioneer Square Habitat Beach is a 200-foot (61 m)-long urban beach south of the Colman Dock in Seattle's Pioneer Square district, in the U.S. state of Washington. It began construction in 2018 and opened in 2023 as part of a multi-year redevelopment of the waterfront and the Alaskan Way Seawall. The beach was designed to use natural topography and plants.
