= Bertha (tunnel boring machine) =

17.5 metres diameter tunnel boring machine

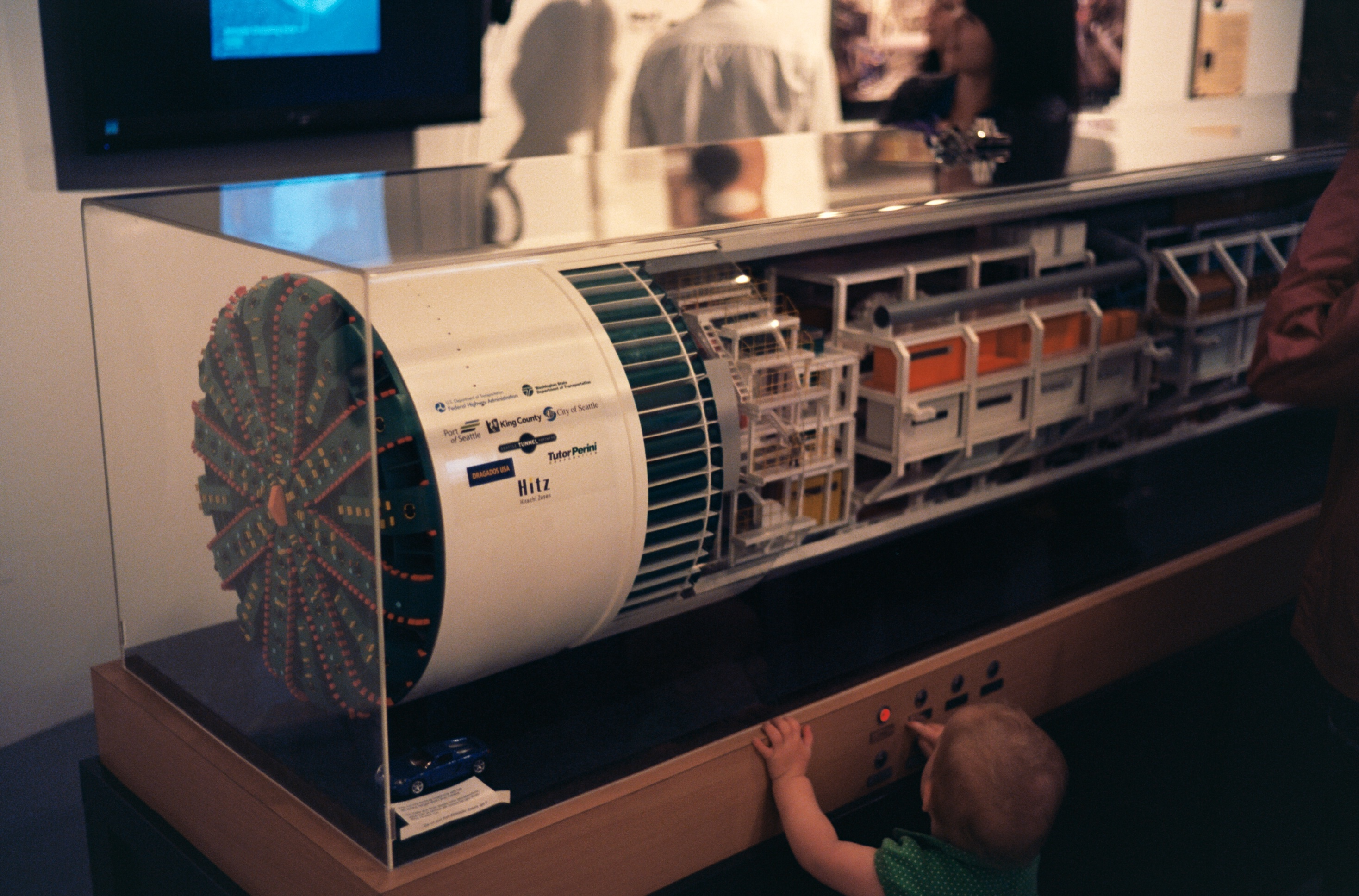
- Front of a model of Bertha at Milepost 31, the tunnel project information center
- Classification: Tunnel boring machine
- Application: State Route 99 tunnel
- Dimensions: Length: 326 feet (99 m); Diameter: 57.5 feet (17.5 m)
- Weight: 6,700 short tons (6,100 t)
- Powered: 24 x 505.7 kW (687.5 hp) cutterhead drive motors; Total: 12.1 MW (16,500 hp)
- Cost: $80 million
- Launched: July 30, 2013
- Disassembled: August 2017

Bertha was a 57.5-foot-diameter (17.5 m) tunnel boring machine built specifically for the Washington State Department of Transportation's (WSDOT) Alaskan Way Viaduct replacement tunnel project in Seattle, Washington, United States. It was made by Hitachi Zosen Sakai Works in Osaka, Japan, and the machine's assembly was completed in Seattle in June 2013. Tunnel boring began on July 30, 2013, with the machine originally scheduled to complete the tunnel in December 2015.

On December 6, 2013, work was halted approximately 1,083 feet (330 m) into the planned 9,270-foot-long (2,830 m) route because of an unexpected impediment. It was thought that several cutting blades were damaged by striking a steel pipe that had been used to measure groundwater in 2002 around the Alaskan Way Viaduct. However, subsequent investigation revealed that portions of the main bearing seal system were damaged, causing the bearing to overheat during operation. Over the next two years, a recovery pit was dug from the surface in order to access and lift the machine's cutterhead for repair and partial replacement in 2015.

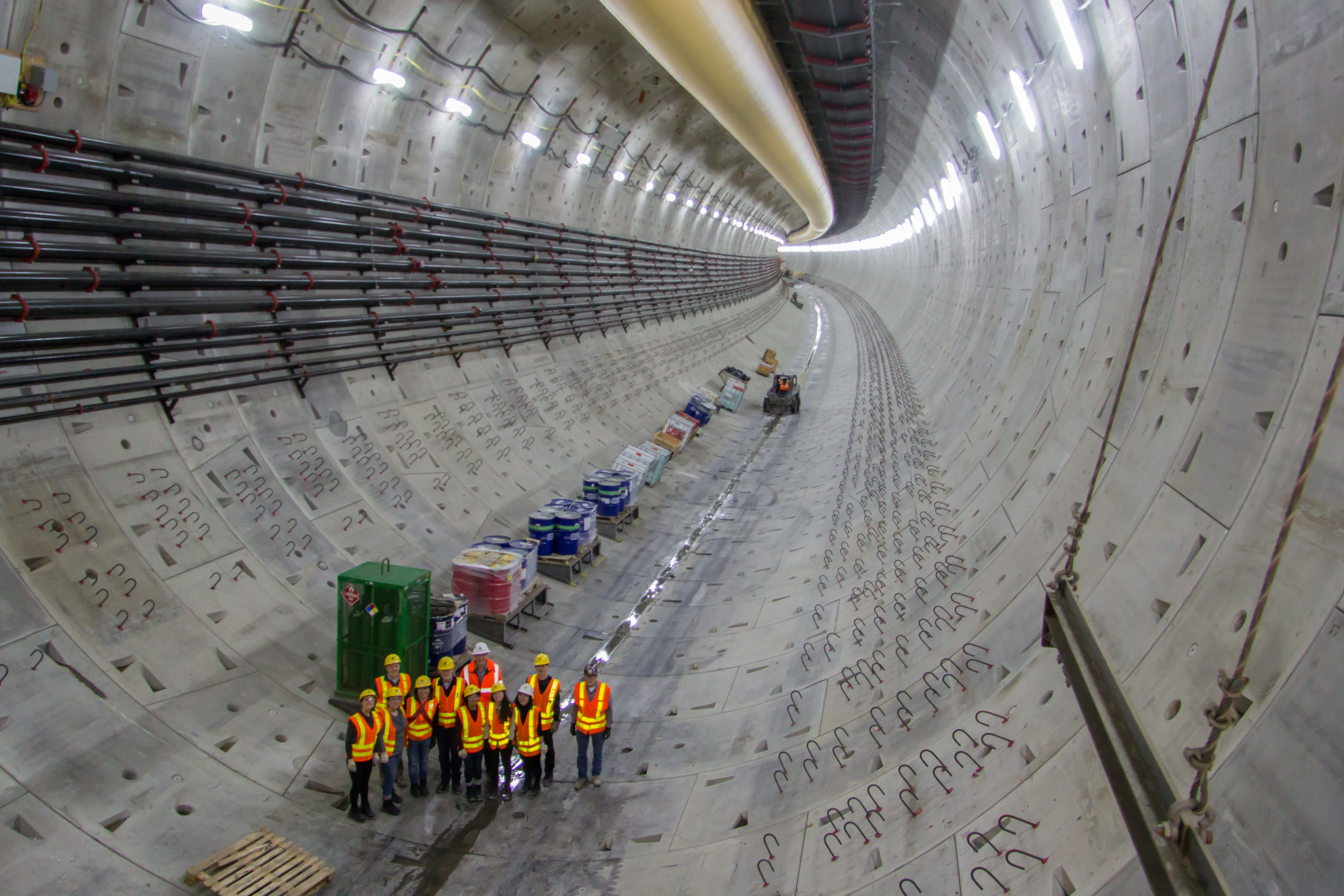
Walls of tunnel in place in January 2017, about two years before the 2019 opening date

Bertha resumed tunnel boring on December 22, 2015, but was stopped in early January 2016 after a tethered barge in Elliott Bay damaged nearby piers and a sinkhole opened near the project site. Governor Jay Inslee halted all work on the tunnel on January 14, 2016, citing concern over public safety after the sinkhole incident. Digging briefly resumed on February 23, but was halted again for maintenance and inspections before resuming full operations on April 29.

In December 2015, WSDOT had estimated that the tunnel would be completed and open to traffic in early 2018. The estimate was revised in July 2016 to open in early 2019 with an estimated $223 million in cost overruns stemming from the two-year delay. Tunnel boring was completed on April 4, 2017, with Bertha's cutterhead breaking through into a disassembly vault at the tunnel's north portal in South Lake Union. The final disassembled pieces of the boring machine were removed in August 2017, and the finished tunnel opened to traffic on February 4, 2019. Bertha's components were not reusable and were scrapped.

== Name ==
The name Bertha, after Seattle's first female mayor, Bertha Knight Landes, was chosen by a panel (that included the Governor and Transportation Secretary) from 150 submissions from kindergarten through 12th graders, who were asked to submit female names with Washington state heritage. The winning entry, which was submitted by two elementary schools in Poulsbo and Hoquiam, was selected in December 2012.

Some media have also referred to the machine as "Big Bertha".

In March 2016, regional transit agency Sound Transit decided to drop names for its own tunnel boring machines, used for smaller light rail tunnels, citing unwanted association and confusion with Bertha, especially the machine "Brenda" used on the Northgate Link Extension and University Link Tunnel.

== Design and assembly ==
Freighter Fairpartner carrying the disassembled tunnel boring machine into the Port of Seattle in April 2013

Bertha was designed and manufactured by Hitachi Zosen Sakai Works of Osaka, Japan, and was the world's largest earth pressure balance tunnel boring machine, at a cutterhead diameter of 57.5 feet (17.5 m) across. The machine was 326 feet (99 m) long and weighed 6,700 short tons (6,100 t). The machine itself cost $80 million and was owned by Seattle Tunnel Partners (STP), the project contractors. STP is a joint venture of New York-based Dragados USA, a wholly owned subsidiary of Dragados, S.A., the construction division of ACS Group of Spain; and Tutor Perini Corporation, based in Sylmar, California.

Hitachi Zosen held a completion ceremony for the machine, performed at the same time as the naming ceremony, in Osaka, Japan, on December 20, 2012. Test assembly and shakedown on Bertha in Japan indicated issues with the main-drive unit and tolerances that required repairs in February 2013. Bertha was shipped to the Port of Seattle in 41 sections, arriving on April 2, 2013.

Bertha had a special pre-programmed melody that played for workers inside the machine and those monitoring the tunnel-borer.

== Excavation ==
=== Dedication and first section ===
The machine began excavation of the 1.7-mile-long (2.7 km) route on July 30, 2013, with completion of the bore scheduled in 14 months' time and the tunnel opening to traffic in December 2015. Over 5,000 members of the public, along with Governor Jay Inslee, were present for the machine's dedication a week prior to the beginning of excavation.

=== Damage to cutterhead and two-year delay ===
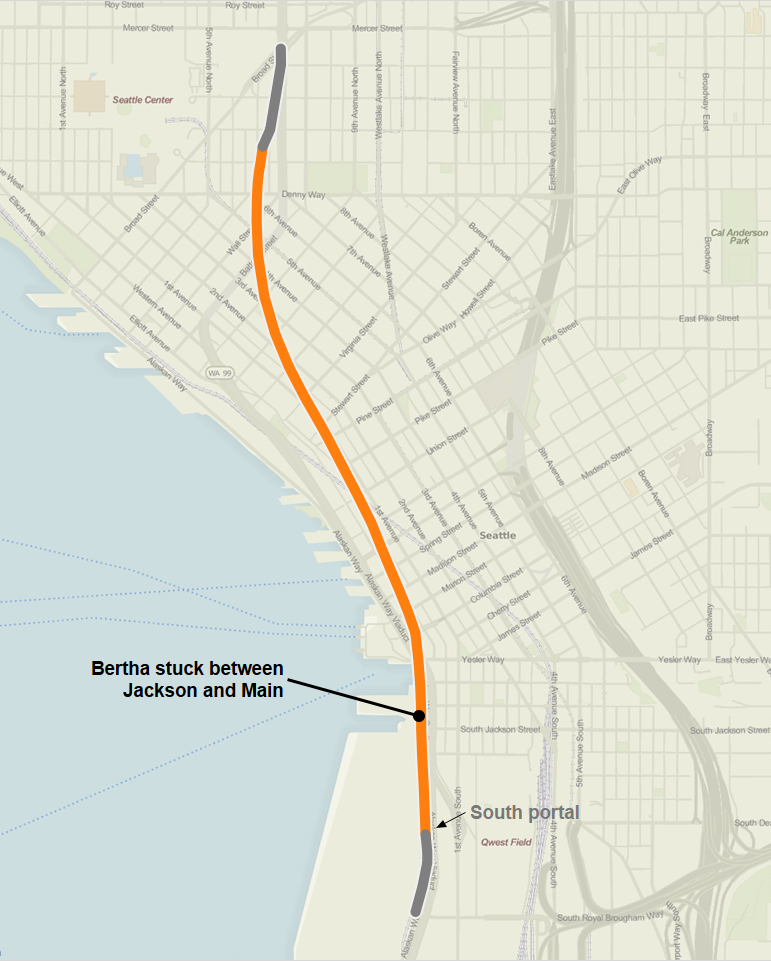
Route map of the Alaskan Way Viaduct replacement tunnel showing location where the tunnel boring machine became stuck on December 6, 2013

By December 6, 2013, Bertha had tunneled 1,019 ft (311 m), or 11%, of the total 9,270 ft (2,830 m) length of the tunnel, stopping about 60 ft (18 m) below ground between South Jackson Street and South Main Street. The machine's progress was halted on that day by an unexpected impediment. After a month's investigation, WSDOT announced that the machine's cutting blades had encountered an 8-inch-diameter (20 cm), 119-foot-long (36 m) steel pipe, one of several well casings left over from a previous 2002 drilling project that had assessed groundwater conditions and soil stability in the area in case of another earthquake, such as the 2001 Nisqually earthquake, which led to a need for the replacing of the Alaskan Way Viaduct in the first place. Because the machine cannot cut through metal, the pipe damaged several of Bertha's cutting blades, necessitating blade replacement before the machine could proceed. The pipes' locations were known to WSDOT and the agency thought they had been removed, while STP admitted in a 2019 lawsuit that they had knowledge of the pipe prior to excavation.

In early February 2014, as Bertha was being prepared to resume operation, workers discovered it was overheating and that a damaged main bearings seal needed to be replaced. Multiple options were discussed to fix the problem, but Bertha was expected to be out of commission until March 2015. In December 2014, workers began digging a 120-foot-deep (37 m) pit in order to lift Bertha's front end up to street level for repairs, but were delayed when groundwater pumping caused visible damage to nearby South King Street and some of its neighboring buildings. The front end of the machine, including the damaged cutter head, was successfully lifted onto the surface on the morning of March 31, 2015. STP estimated that fixing Bertha would delay the opening of the new tunnel by an additional nine months to August 2017, which was later extended to March 2018 after additional damage was discovered in June 2015.

On May 18, 2015, WSDOT reported to the Seattle City Council that the damage to the bearing and seals was worse than had been previously reported. Further inspection after the cutting head was removed and disassembled showed damage to the cutter head drive gears, so a new estimate of the repair time and cost was prepared.

The front end of the machine was lowered back into the access pit for reassembly in a four-lift process beginning with the repaired cutter drive on August 24, 2015.

In June 2015, STP sued to force insurers to payout on the $85 million insurance policy to cover repairs needed after Bertha's cutting teeth were damaged in a collision with a steel pipe in December 2013. In August 2015, a consortium of eight insurers filed a lawsuit against STP in order to avoid a $143 million payout to cover the cost of repairs to the boring machine. The insurers claimed that the tunnel-boring machine's capabilities were inadequate for the project and should be excluded.

It is unclear what triggered the damage to Bertha's main bearing. Problems with the seal system appear to date back to the machine's initial testing in Japan, when the seal assembly was damaged and required repairs. However, Hitachi Zosen general manager Soichi Takaura later stated that "there was nothing wrong with the seals in the original machine", noting that Bertha appeared to function properly before striking the well casing. WSDOT disputed this, and stated that the well casing was not responsible.

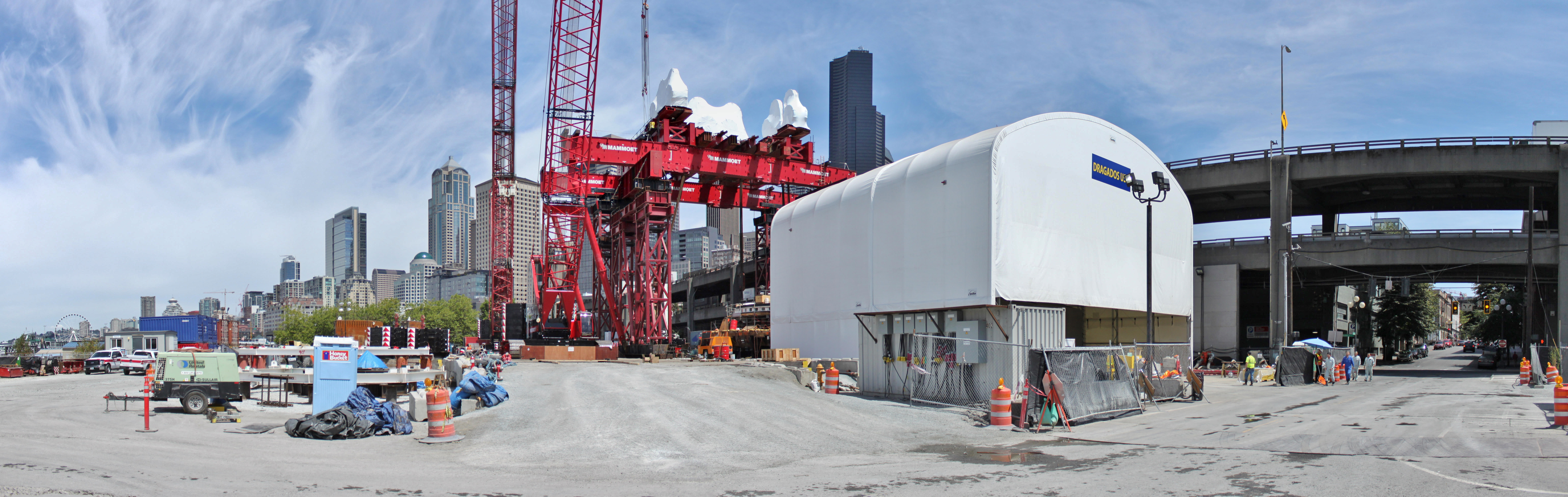
View of retrieval site for repairs of Bertha's cutter head. The red gantry crane, center, was used to lift the cutter head from a shaft dug in front of the stuck boring machine. The white shed, right, was built to house the head during repairs and upgrades, and then the head was lowered back down the shaft and reinstalled.

=== Resumption of digging and subsequent activities ===
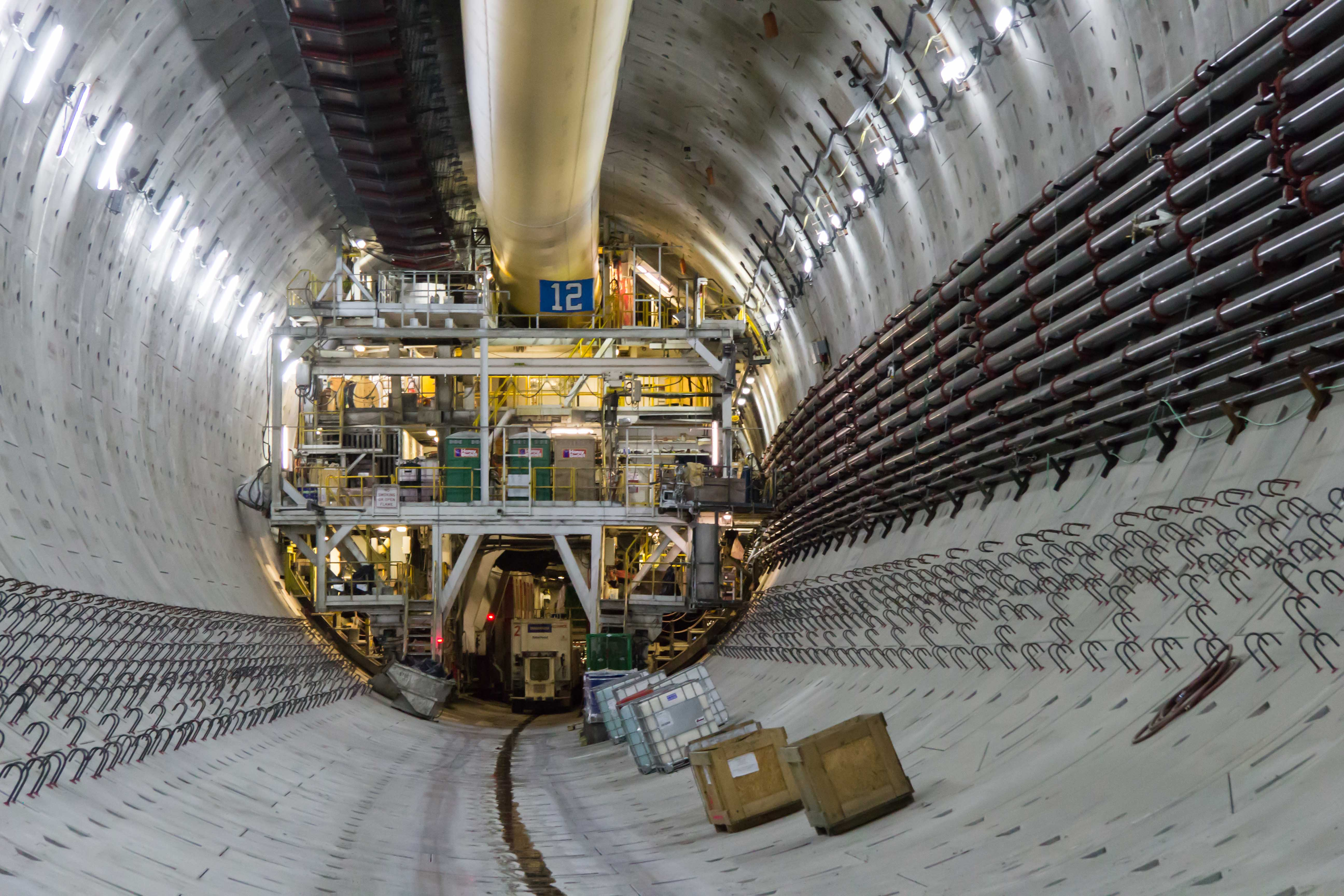
Rear of tunnel boring machine with completed tunnel walls behind it in 2017

On December 22, 2015 at 12:30 a.m., the machine resumed digging 1.5 feet (0.46 m) through sand poured into the recovery pit. By January 4, Bertha had traveled 1,098 feet (335 m) of its planned 9,270-foot-long (2,830 m) route from SoDo to South Lake Union. On January 6, 2016, Bertha broke through the concrete access vault and began digging through normal soil. Digging was halted once again on January 12, 2016, after a barge carrying excavated dirt tipped over in Elliott Bay, spilling its load and damaging a dock at the Port of Seattle's Terminal 46. The same day, a sinkhole formed within the tunnel's work zone approximately 35 feet (11 m) north of the access pit; the hole was filled with 250 cubic yards (190 m^{3}) of concrete by contractors the following day and was not expected by WSDOT to delay the resumption of digging later in the week.

On January 14, 2016, Governor Jay Inslee ordered drilling on the tunnel to stop, invoking a contract clause in the tunnel agreement that allowed the state to suspend work based on unsafe conditions for project personnel or the general public. Before excavation of the tunnel could resume, WSDOT requested that STP complete and deliver an analysis of what caused the January 12 sinkhole and what modifications to tunneling operations could be made to prevent further ground-level problems.

Digging resumed on February 23, after a WSDOT review determined that new soil monitoring practices were sufficient, allowing the machine conditional permission to bore through 160 feet (49 m) of material and finish the initial testing phase of the machine. By March 14, Bertha had finished its 300-foot (91 m) bore to a "safe haven" located ahead of the Alaskan Way Viaduct; allowing WSDOT and STP to prepare for a two-week closure of the viaduct in late April as the machine passed under the vulnerable structure while closely monitored. Following a month of maintenance and inspections, Bertha resumed tunneling on Friday, April 29, 2016, and crossed 15 feet (4.6 m) under the closed viaduct in an 11-day closure in early May that ended earlier than scheduled.

In June 2016, the tunnel reached its lowest point, 115 feet (35 m) under Madison Street in downtown. A maintenance stop from June 23 to July 18 was conducted under Spring Street, replacing 33 of the cutterhead's teeth.

By September 30, 2016, Bertha had tunneled 4,635 feet (1,413 m), surpassing the halfway mark of the planned 9,270-foot (2,830 m) distance. As of December 15, 2016, the tunnel length reached 70% completion.

Tunnel boring was completed on April 4, 2017, and the finished tunnel opened to traffic on February 4, 2019. Practically none of Bertha's components were reusable, and most of its steel was melted and recycled. The final, disassembled pieces of Bertha were removed from the tunnel portal in August 2017.

=== Zone advancement ===
Bertha's digging route was divided into 10 zones, representing different types of soil or progress under city landmarks.

Zone	Date reached	Days since entering the previous zone
Zone 3	May 26, 2016	n/a
Zone 4	June 16, 2016	21
Zone 5	August 1, 2016	46
Zone 6	August 29, 2016	28
Zone 7	November 3, 2016	66
Zone 8	December 1, 2016	28
Zone 9	January 27, 2017	57
Zone 10	March 9, 2017	41

== Controversy ==
The two-year stoppage of Bertha has been criticized as an example of a political boondoggle by opponents.

In January 2015, two Republican state senators introduced a bill in the Washington State Legislature to kill the project, citing Bertha and its delay in particular. The bill was never heard in the state Senate and failed to pass the Senate Transportation Committee.

== See also ==
- Beck tunnel boring machine – former world's largest tunnel boring machine, prior to Bertha
- Tuen Mun–Chek Lap Kok TBM – current world's largest, succeeding Bertha
