= Beck tunnel boring machine =

Largest tunnel boring machine in the world

The Beck tunnel boring machine (alternately Big Becky) was the largest tunnel boring machine in the world, when it was operated by Ontario Power Generation, from 2006 to 2011. Hydro used it to bore a deep replacement tunnel to supply water from the upper Niagara River 10.2 kilometres (6.3 mi) to the Sir Adam Beck Hydroelectric Plant. The tunnel it bored was 14.4 metres (47 ft) in diameter.

The tunnel was delayed when Beck encountered a bed of loose material, unsuitable for boring, that required a detour.

According to Ontario Power Generation the TBM itself weighed 2,000 tonnes (2,000 long tons; 2,200 short tons). However, when its task was complete, Western Mechanical, the firm that removed Beck, described it weighing 7,000 tonnes (6,900 long tons; 7,700 short tons).
