= The Recipe Project =

The Recipe Project is a CD-book combo produced by chefs and musicians on the relationship between music and food, published by Black Balloon Publishing. It comprises two elements: a CD of recipes of chefs put to music, and a book containing the recipes, interviews with the chefs, and food writing.

The project began when co-founders of the band One Ring Zero, Michael Hearst and Joshua Camp used American chef Chris Cosentino's recipe for Brains and Eggs as song lyrics, producing it in the genre preferred by Cosentino. Chefs brought into the project included Mario Batali, Isa Chandra Moskowitz, Tom Colicchio.

The project received generally received positive reactions. An article on the project in Edible Brooklyn called the CD "A feast for the ears," Time magazine wrote "Every once in a while you come across a project and think, I can’t believe no one has done this before", while saying the song lyrics meant they were not suited for casual listening.

As of 2011, an app was also available on Apple devices, permitting the user to put in up to five ingredients to receive relevant recipes and a listening feature that played One Ring Zero's music. A review in Toque Magazine found the app incomplete but "oddly charming", rating it 2.5/5.
