= Finca Bellavista =

Coordinates: 8.78338°N 83.21130°W

Finca Bellavista is a self-sustaining tree-house community in Costa Rica encompassing 600 acres (2.4 km^{2}) of rainforest. It was founded in 2007. The property is owned by Crested Beauty, S.A, which sells lots of between two and 5 acres (20,000 m^{2}) to the general public, in which a stilt house or tree house may be built. Residents are required to purchase a biodigester

As of 2016, Finca Bellavista attracts 5,000 visitors a year

== Founders ==
Finca Bellavista was founded by Matthew Hogan and Erica Andrews.
