= Andrea Reusing =

American chef

- Spouse: Mac McCaughan
- Culinary career
- Cooking style: Asian cuisine American cuisine
- Current restaurant(s): Lantern; The Restaurant at The Durham
- Previous restaurant(s): Enoteca Vin
- Award(s) won: James Beard Foundation Award Best Chef Southeast 2011

Andrea Reusing is an American chef, best known for her restaurant Lantern in Chapel Hill, North Carolina. In 2011, she won the Best Chef Southeast award from the James Beard Foundation Awards.

== Career ==
Andrea Reusing opened a wine focused restaurant in Raleigh, North Carolina, named Enoteca Vin. She opened her Asian cuisine based restaurant Lantern in Chapel Hill, North Carolina, in 2002. At her restaurant, she seeks to source the majority of her ingredients locally. In 2011, she was awarded the James Beard Foundation Award for Best Chef Southeast, the same year she had her first cookbook published entitled Cooking in the Moment: A Year of Seasonal Recipes. The book featured a couple of dishes from her restaurant, but was mostly recollections of dishes from her childhood.

Unlike at Lantern, at Reusing's Restaurant at the Durham in North Carolina, she serves American cuisine. She had previously not sought to open a restaurant within a hotel, but the design of The Durham hotel attracted her. She also founded the non-profit organisation Kitchen Patrol, which provides classes on healthy eating to children.

== Personal life ==
She is married to musician Mac McCaughan, and they have two children together.
