= Amy Fusselman =

American writer

- Education: Ohio State University (BA); Boston University (MA)
- Occupations: Novelist; essayist

Amy Fusselman is an American author. Her work, including fiction and nonfiction in the form of novels and essays, centers on social issues, complex family dynamics, and the absurdity of everyday life. She often writes in a humorous style, blending prose and poetry. Fusselman's creative writing combines unconventional fragmented structure with circular narratives, allowing for leaps across time and subject without traditional linear transitions.

== Education ==
Fusselman received her Bachelor of Arts in English from Ohio State University and earned a Master of Arts in creative writing from Boston University.

== Career ==
Through the 1990s, Fusselman published Bunnyrabbit, an experimental zine.

Fusselman's hybrid writing integrates prose, poetry, and essay. McSweeney's published her first book, The Pharmacist's Mate, in 2001 and Penguin Books published a softcover edition in 2002. This was later followed by 8 (2007), Savage Park: A Meditation on Play, Space, and Risk for Americans Who Are Nervous, Distracted, and Afraid to Die (2015), Idiophone (2018), and The Means (2022). Cloud Six (2026) is an absurdist novel about a couple in the lowest tier of heaven. The experimental structure of Cloud Six explores similar subject matter to her earlier books, such as play and imagination in Savage Park; parenthood and addiction in Idiophone; and anti-capitalist satire in The Means.

Her freelance writing has been published in The New York Times, The Wall Street Journal, The Washington Post, and The Atlantic. Her column Family Practice, for McSweeney's Internet Tendency, observes intersections between parenting, play, risk-taking, and work.

In addition to writing, Fusselman taught creative writing at New York University's School of Professional Studies from 2020 to 2022.

== Personal life ==
Fusselman lives with her family in New York City.

Fusselman contributes to programs at Girls Write Now, which matches young women from disadvantaged backgrounds with professional women writers. In 2014 Fusselman gave the keynote address, "Owning Your Work: Speaking with Strength and Courage", during their annual CHAPTERS event.

== Publications ==
- The Pharmacist's Mate. McSweeney's. 2001. ISBN 978-0970335531.
- 8: All True: Unbelievable. Counterpoint. 2007. ISBN 978-1-582-43368-4.
- Savage Park: A Meditation on Play, Space, and Risk for Americans Who Are Nervous, Distracted, and Afraid to Die. Houghton Mifflin Harcourt. 2015. ISBN 978-0-544-30300-3.
- Idiophone. Coffee House Press. 2018. ISBN 978-1-566-89513-2.
- The Means. Mariner Books. 2022. ISBN 978-0-063-24871-7.
- Cloud Six. Catapult. 2026. ISBN 978-1-64622-348-0.
