= Alaskan Way Seawall =

Seawall in Seattle, Washington

Coordinates: 47°36′16″N 122°20′21″W

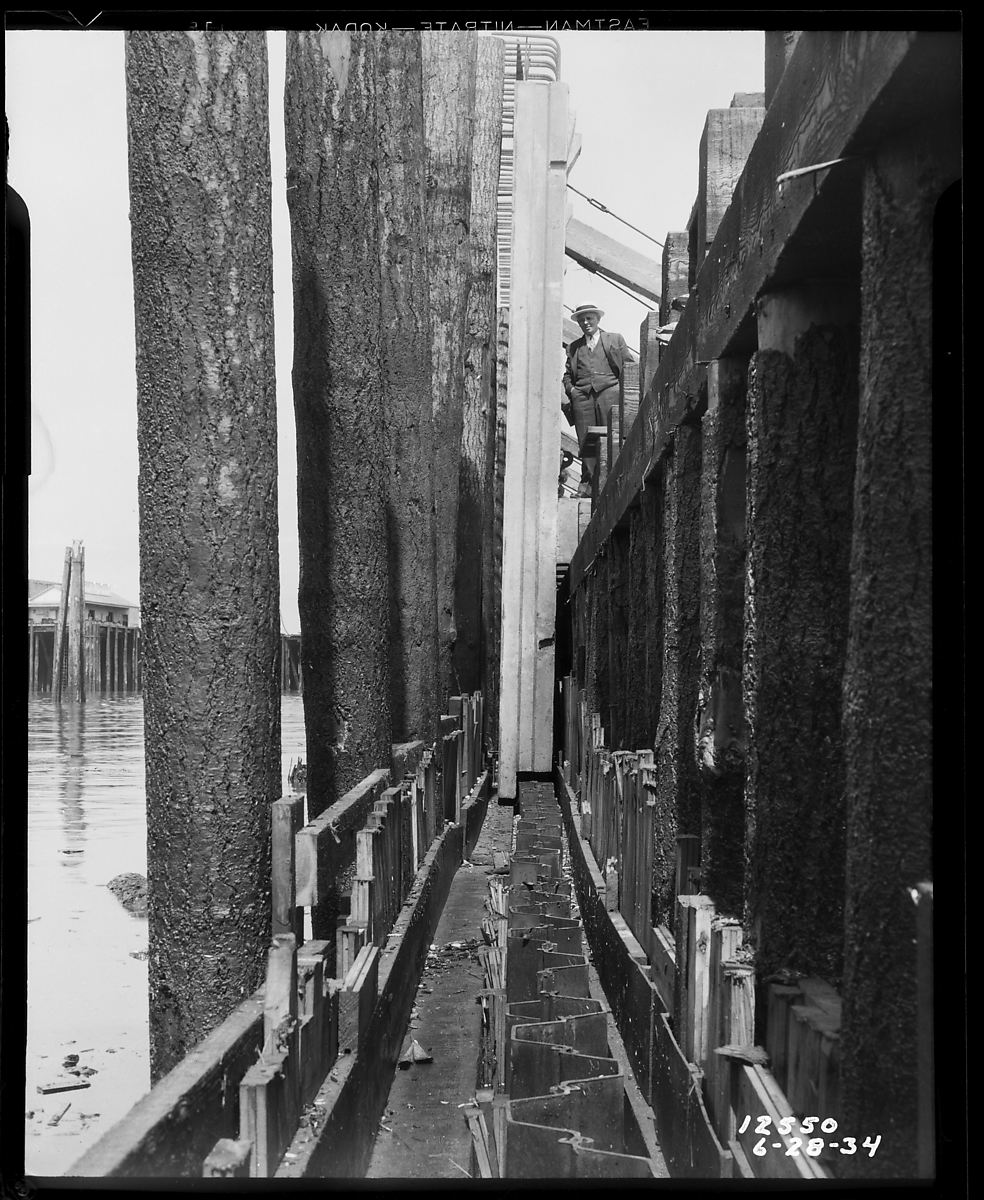
Seawall construction, 1934

The Alaskan Way Seawall is a seawall which runs for approximately 7,166 feet (2,184 m) along the Elliott Bay waterfront southwest of downtown Seattle from Bay Street to S. Washington Street. The seawall was rebuilt in the 2010s as part of a waterfront redevelopment megaproject estimated to cost over $1 billion.

== History ==
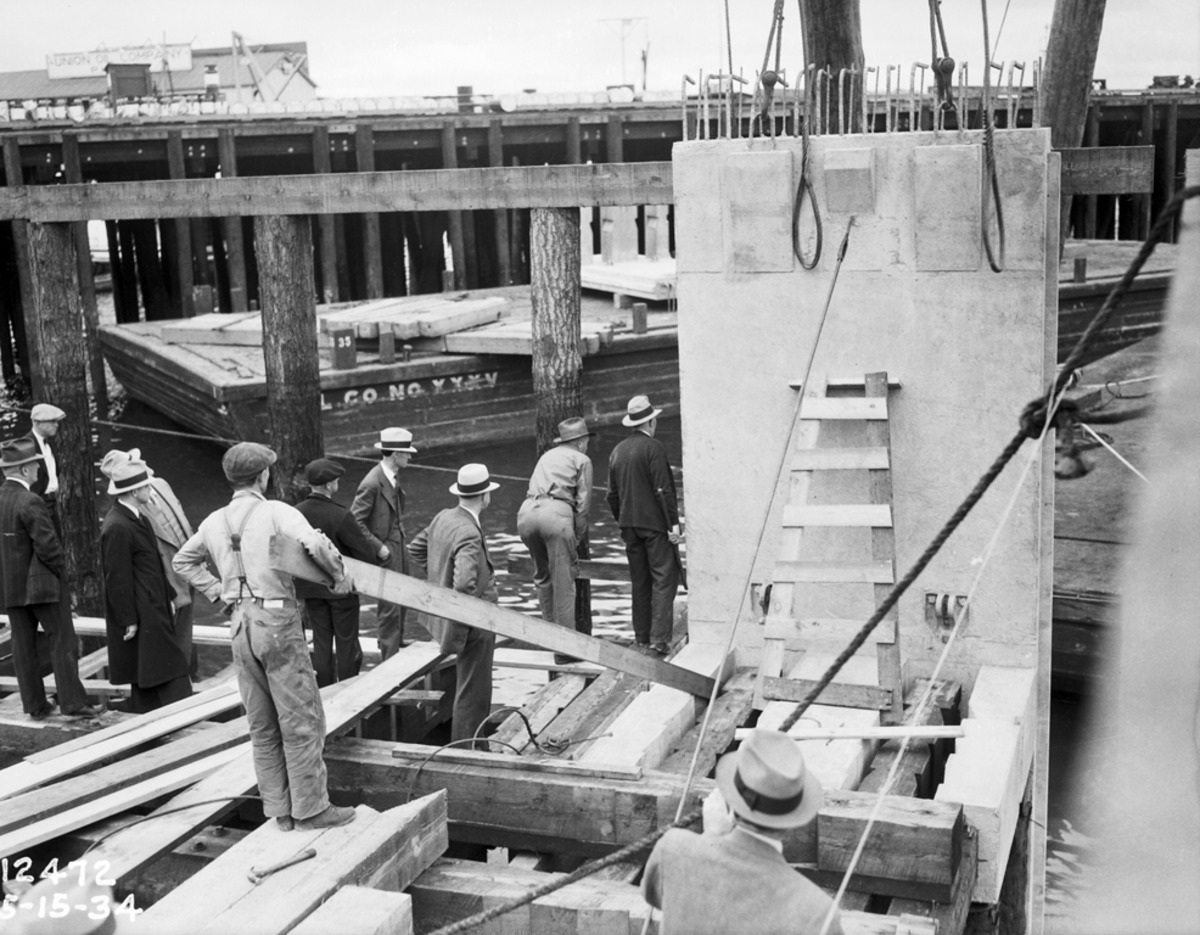
First slab of Seattle Central Waterfront seawall being placed, 1934

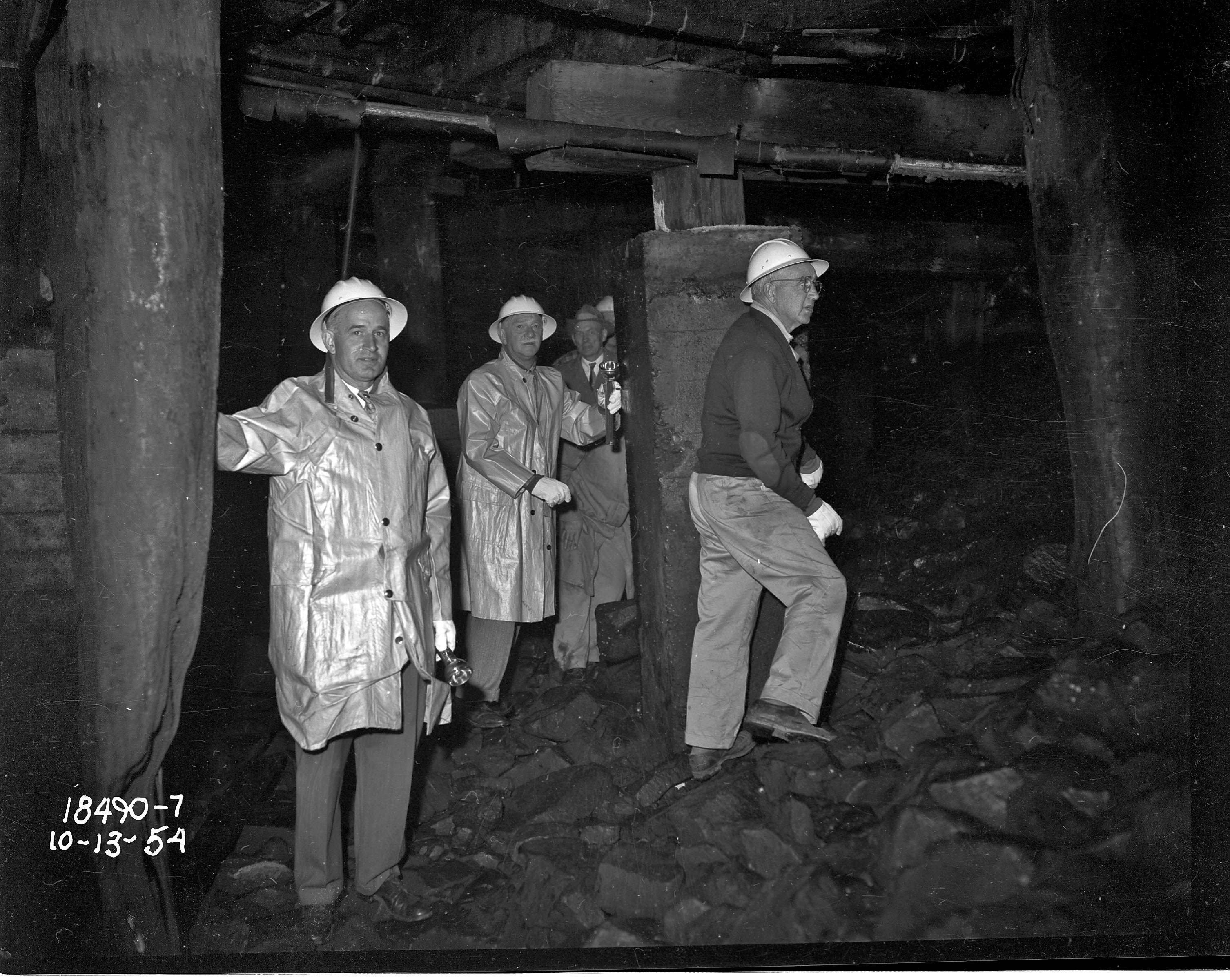
Seawall inspection, 1954

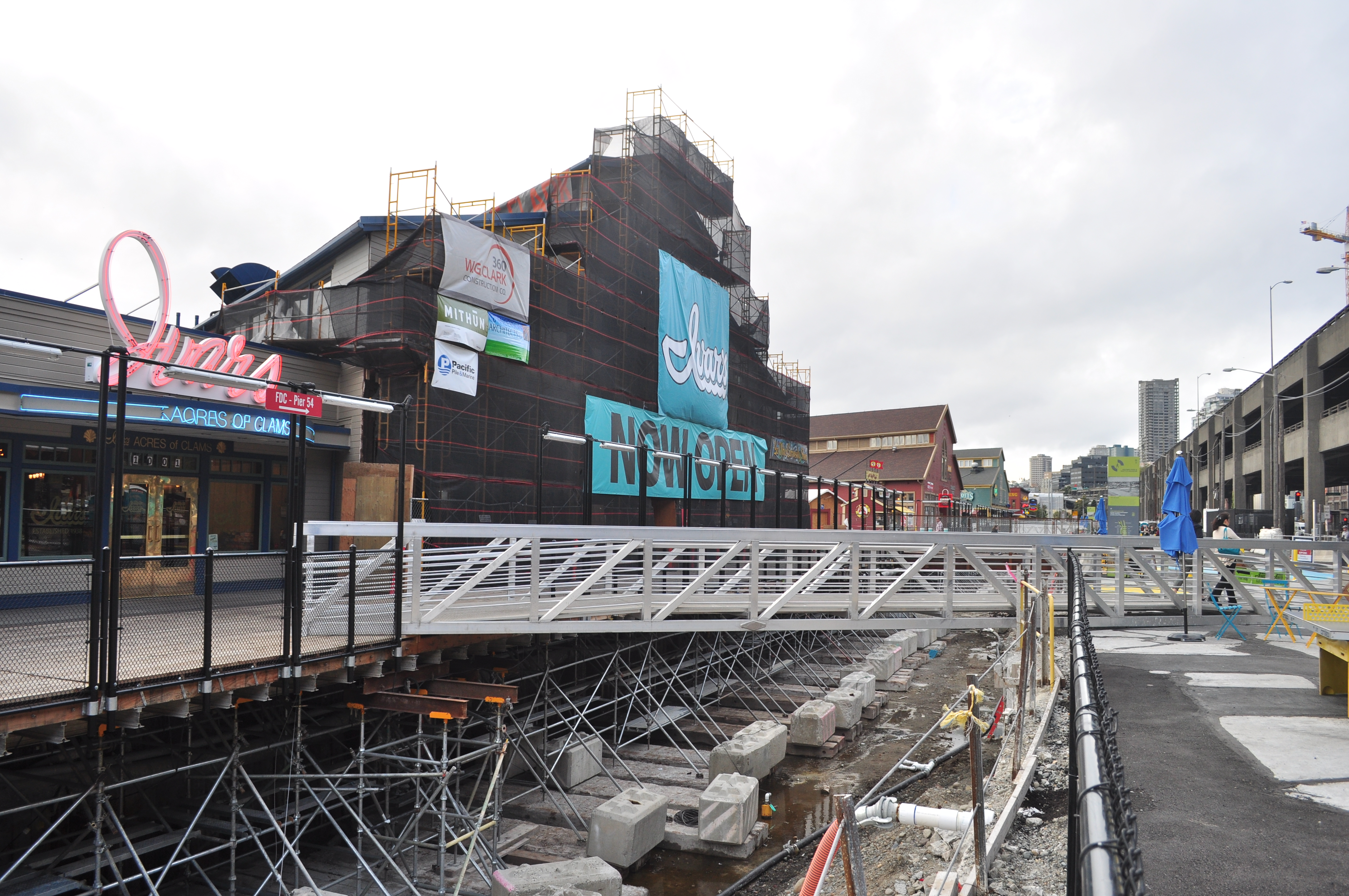
Seawall replacement, 2015. Pier 54 at left.

The seawall was built to provide level access to Seattle's piers and supports the Alaskan Way Viaduct and Alaskan Way itself, which is a surface street. Completed in 1934, the seawall was built on top of wood piling.

=== Replacement ===
Despite efforts to prevent marine pest damage when the seawall was designed, after the 2001 Nisqually earthquake, the Seattle Department of Transportation found that gribbles had consumed all the wooden supports in some places.

The Washington State Department of Transportation states that there is a 1-in-20 chance that it could be shut down by an earthquake within the next decade, and so plans have been underway to replace both seawall and viaduct.

The seawall rebuild project was estimated to cost $350 million as part of an overall waterfront redevelopment budgeted in 2012 at $1.07 billion. The project is funded by a bond measure that was approved by Seattle voters in the November 2012 general election. Construction began in 2013 and was completed in 2017, more than a year late and costing $410 million.

== See also ==
- Alaskan Way Viaduct replacement tunnel, more information on the replacement project
