= List of women company founders =

This is a list of women company founders, sorted alphabetically:

== A ==
- Mo Abudu
- Olajumoke Adenowo
- Salwa Idrissi Akhannouch
- Folorunsho Alakija
- Jessica Alba
- Janine Allis
- Mother Angelica
- Cheryl Arrowsmith
- Laura Ashley
- Bolanle Austen-Peters
- Linda Avey

== B ==
- Viveka Babajee
- Bibi Bakare-Yusuf
- Romana Acosta Bañuelos
- Drew Barrymore
- Ayah Bdeir
- Olive Ann Beech
- Alice Bentinck
- Gina Bianchini
- Sara Blakely
- Francesca Bortolotto Possati
- Anita Schjøll Brede
- Lulu Brown
- Sandra Bullock
- Tory Burch
- Margaret Busby
- Lauren Bush

== C ==
- Jan Cameron
- Julie Chaiken
- Juliana Chan
- Coco Chanel
- Nancy T. Chang
- Eva Chen
- Jane Chen
- Leeann Chin
- Phyllis Christian
- Yael Cohen
- Zee Cohen-Sanchez
- Jenny Craig
- Jan Crouch
- Lucia Cunanan
- Louisa Knapp Curtis

== D ==
- Evelyn de Mille
- Dorimène Roy Desjardins
- Marthe Distel
- Jenny Doan
- Donna Dubinsky
- Helen Duhamel
- Marguerite Durand
- Adele Duttweiler

== E ==
- Fifi Ejindu
- Inger McCabe Elliott
- Jeri Ellsworth
- Judith Estrin
- Melanie Eusebe

== F ==
- Caterina Fake
- Lizanne Falsetto
- Tara Fela-Durotoye
- Samrawit Fikru
- Doris F. Fisher
- Jennifer Fleiss
- Ping Fu

== G ==
- Susie Galvez
- Jennifer Garner
- Muma Gee
- Françoise Giroud
- Anne Glover
- Diane Greene
- Serena Guen

== H ==
- Kathryn Hach-Darrow
- Vivienne Harris (businesswoman)
- Dianne Haskett
- Christy Haubegger
- Diane Hendricks
- Carolina Herrera (fashion designer)
- Ingeborg Hochmair
- Catherine Hoke
- Krisztina Holly
- Elizabeth Holmes
- Jessica Huntley
- Jennifer Hyman

== I ==
- Marian Ilitch
- Janine Irons

== J ==
- Jessica Jackley
- Christine Jennings
- Mary Lou Jepsen
- Margaret Josephs

== K ==
- Katherine Anna Kang
- Elle Kaplan
- Margaret Karcher
- Kathy Keeton
- Kehinde Kamson
- Carolyn Kepcher
- Miranda Kerr
- Nicole Kersh
- Nicole Kidman
- Jasmina King
- Natalia King
- Tina Knowles
- Beyoncé Knowles-Carter
- Sandra Kurtzig

== L ==
- Maxine Lapiduss
- Dylan Lauren
- Aileen Lee
- Hayley Leibson
- Prue Leith
- Bonnie Leman
- Tara Lemmey
- Jacqueline Leo
- Sandy Lerner
- Christine Liang
- Andrea Lo
- Jennifer Lopez

== M ==
- Julie Macklowe
- Christine Magee
- Marjorie Magner
- Alice Marriott
- Natalie Massenet
- Jennifer McGarigle
- Sara Anne McLagan
- Sarma Melngailis
- Teresa H. Meng
- Heidi Messer
- Janee Michelle
- Carole Middleton
- Kathryn Minshew
- Brit Morin
- Beth Murphy
- Margaret Lally "Ma" Murray

== N ==
- Nicole Notat

== O ==
- Ola Orekunrin
- Mildred Ellen Orton

== P ==
- Despina Papadopoulos
- Alicia Patterson
- Monique Péan
- Melissa Perello
- Irina Petrushova
- Tiffany Pham
- Mary Pickford
- Laurene Powell Jobs
- Jane Pratt
- Mandy Price
- Jennifer N. Pritzker
- Penny Pritzker

== R ==
- Laurice Rahmé
- Heather Reisman
- Anita Roddick
- Monique Rodriguez
- Rossana Rossanda
- Martine Rothblatt
- Marilyn Rubinson
- Helena Rubinstein
- Michele Ruiz
- Sarina Russo

== S ==
- Mary Ann Sainsbury
- Harriet Samuel, founder of H. Samuel
- Jeannette Scalé (1862-1938) British entrepreneur
- Selena
- Mary Ann Shadd
- Tina Sharkey
- Clara Shih
- Naomi Simson
- Esther Snyder
- Leah Solivan
- Kate Spade
- Christine Spiten
- Patti Stanger
- Sally Steele
- Debbie Sterling
- Martha Stewart
- Jill Stuart
- Riniki Bhuyan Sarma

== T ==
- Vivienne Tam
- Therese Tucker

== V ==
- Gloria Vanderbilt
- Deena Varshavskaya
- Fernanda Viégas

== W ==
- Lila Bell Wallace
- Cher Wang
- Vera Wang
- Haley Webb
- Patti Webster
- Margaret Weis
- Meg Whitman
- Verna Wilkins
- Virginia Williamson
- Oprah Winfrey
- Amanda Wixted
- Anne Wojcicki
- Victoria Woodhull

== Y ==
- Lovie Yancey
- Peggy Yu
- Dina Yuen

== Z ==
- Zhou Qunfei
- Lydia Zimmermann
