= 2013 Arizona Cardinals season =

NFL team season

- Owner: Bill Bidwill
- General manager: Steve Keim
- Head coach: Bruce Arians
- Home stadium: University of Phoenix Stadium

Results
- Record: 10–6
- Division place: 3rd NFC West
- Playoffs: Did not qualify
- Pro Bowlers: DE John Abraham; ST Justin Bethel; CB Patrick Peterson; WR Larry Fitzgerald

Uniform
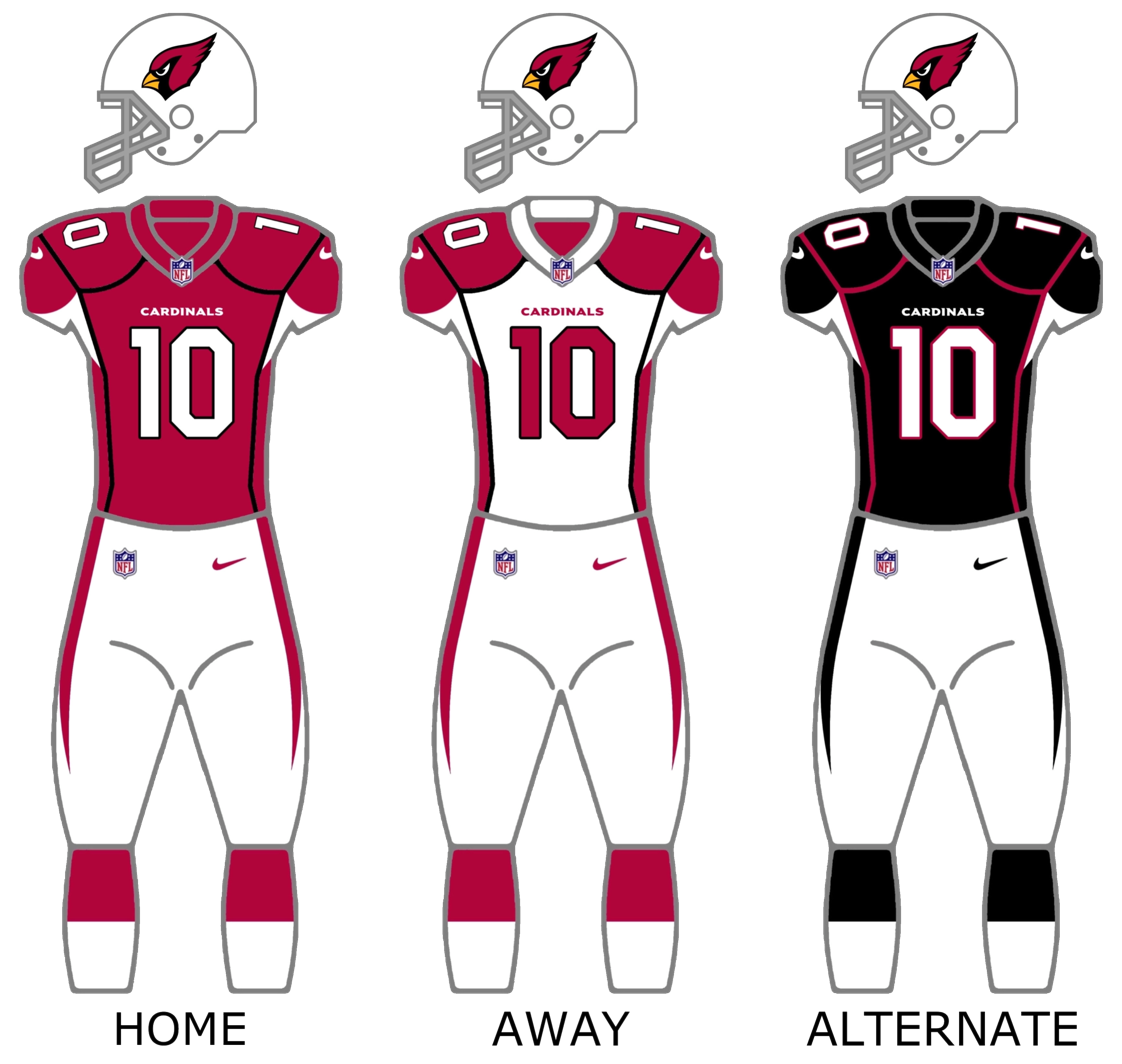

The 2013 season was the Arizona Cardinals' 94th in the National Football League (NFL), their 26th in Arizona and their first under head coach Bruce Arians. The team finished with a 10–6 record, which was the second time in 37 years that the team finished with at least 10 wins. The Cardinals doubled their win total from 2012, and were in playoff contention heading into the Week 17 regular season finale, but missed the playoffs for a fourth consecutive season.

== 2013 draft class ==
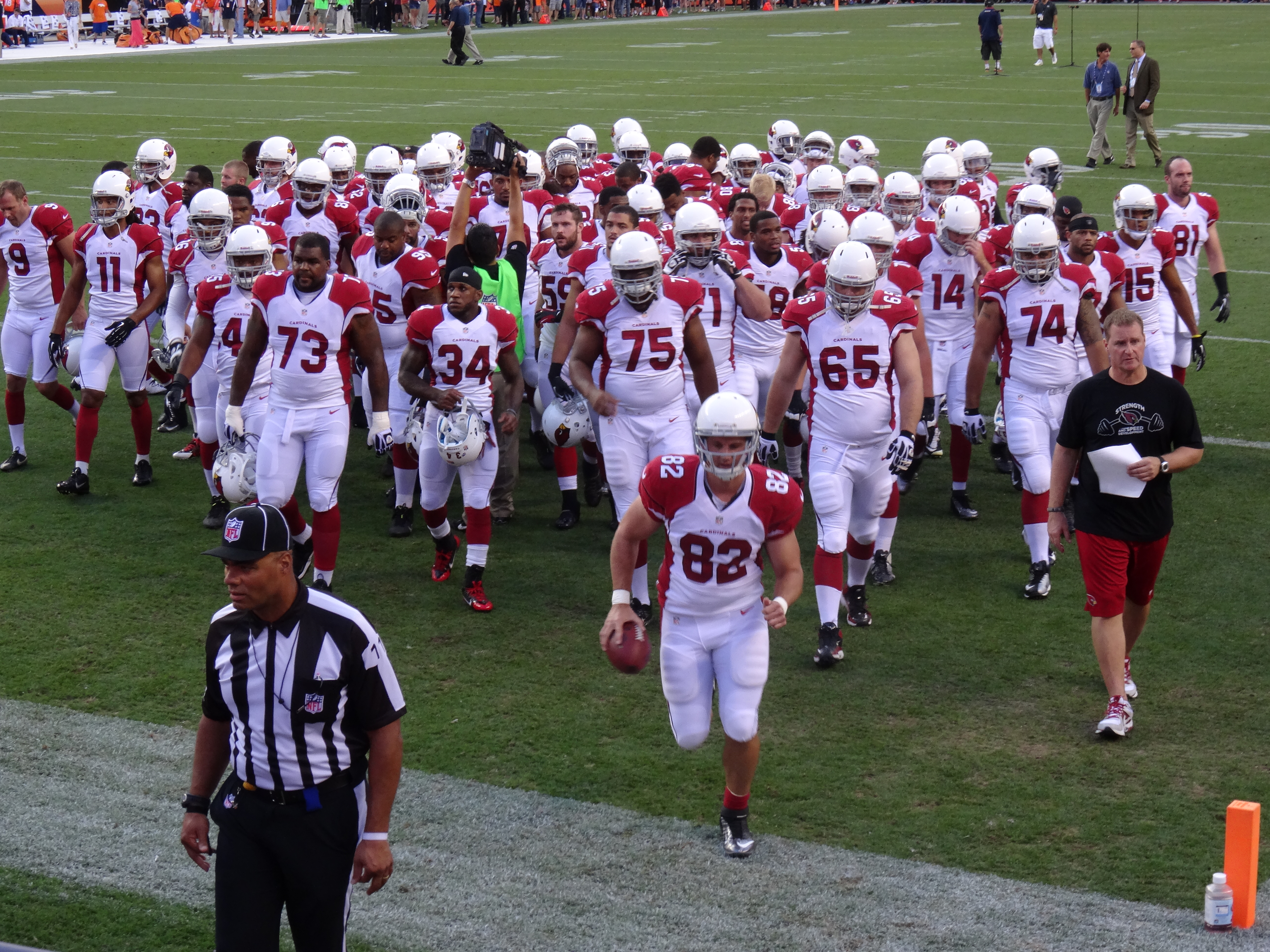
Cardinals players during preseason, August 29

Round	Selection	Player	Position	College
1	7	Jonathan Cooper	G	North Carolina
2	45 (Note: The Cardinals traded their second-round selection (No. 38 overall) to the San Diego Chargers in exchange for the Chargers' second- and fourth- round selections – Nos. 45 and 110 overall. The Cardinals later traded the No. 110 selection to the New York Giants in exchange for the Giants' fourth- (No. 116) and sixth- (No. 187 overall) round selections.)	Kevin Minter	LB	LSU
3	69	Tyrann Mathieu	CB/S	LSU
4	103	Alex Okafor	LB/DE	Texas
4	116	Earl Watford	G	James Madison
5	140	Stepfan Taylor	RB	Stanford
6 (Note: The Cardinals acquired an additional sixth-round selection – No. 176 overall – in a trade that sent cornerback A. J. Jefferson and the team's original seventh-round selection (No. 213 overall) to the Minnesota Vikings. The Cardinals later traded the No. 176 selection along with a conditional 2014 selection to the Oakland Raiders in exchange for quarterback Carson Palmer and one of the Raiders' seventh-round selections (No. 219 overall).)	174	Ryan Swope	WR	Texas A&M
6	187	Andre Ellington	RB	Clemson
7	219	D. C. Jefferson	TE	Rutgers

== Staff ==
2013 Arizona Cardinals staff
Front office: Owner/chairman – Bill Bidwill; President – Michael Bidwill; General manager – Steve Keim; Vice president of player personnel – Jason Licht; Director of college scouting – Dru Grigson; Director of pro scouting – Quentin Harris; Head coaches: Head coach – Bruce Arians; Assistant head coach/offense – Tom Moore; Offensive coaches: Offensive coordinator/offensive line – Harold Goodwin; Quarterbacks – Freddie Kitchens; Running backs – Stump Mitchell; Wide receivers – Darryl Drake; Tight ends – Rick Christophel; Assistant tight ends/assistant special teams – Steve Heiden; Assistant offensive line – Larry Zierlein; Offensive quality control – Kevin Garver	Defensive coaches: Defensive coordinator – Todd Bowles; Defensive line – Brentson Buckner; Outside linebackers – James Bettcher; Inside linebackers – Mike Caldwell; Defensive backs – Nick Rapone; Cornerbacks – Kevin Ross; Defensive assistant/assistant defensive backs – Ryan Slowik; Pass rush specialist – Tom Pratt; Special teams coaches: Special teams coordinator – Amos Jones; Assistant special teams coach – Anthony Blevins; Strength and conditioning: Strength and conditioning – John Lott; Assistant strength and conditioning – Pete Alosi

== Final roster ==
2013 Arizona Cardinals roster
Quarterbacks (QB): 14 Ryan Lindley; 3 Carson Palmer; 5 Drew Stanton; Running backs (RB): 38 Andre Ellington; 28 Rashard Mendenhall; 29 Alfonso Smith; 30 Stepfan Taylor; 34 Ryan Williams; Wide receivers (WR): 13 Jaron Brown; 11 Larry Fitzgerald; 15 Michael Floyd; 10 Brittan Golden; 12 Andre Roberts; Tight ends (TE): 86 Jake Ballard; 81 Jim Dray; 84 Rob Housler; 83 Kory Sperry	Offensive linemen (OL): 71 Daryn Colledge G; 74 Paul Fanaika G; 69 Mike Gibson C/G; 70 Bobby Massie T; 76 Nate Potter T; 63 Lyle Sendlein C; 79 Bradley Sowell T; 78 Earl Watford G; 73 Eric Winston T; Defensive linemen (DL): 93 Calais Campbell DE; 90 Darnell Dockett DE; 98 Frostee Rucker DE; 96 Ronald Talley DE; 66 Alameda Ta'amu NT; 92 Dan Williams NT	Linebackers (LB): 55 John Abraham OLB; 59 Marcus Benard OLB; 52 Jasper Brinkley ILB; 56 Karlos Dansby ILB; 51 Kevin Minter ILB; 50 Dontay Moch OLB; 91 Matt Shaughnessy OLB; 58 Daryl Washington ILB; Defensive backs (DB): 35 Javier Arenas CB; 37 Yeremiah Bell SS; 31 Justin Bethel CB; 20 Antoine Cason CB; 22 Tony Jefferson FS; 26 Rashad Johnson FS; 23 Bryan McCann CB; 21 Patrick Peterson CB; 25 Jerraud Powers CB; 27 Curtis Taylor SS; Special teams (ST): 4 Jay Feely K; 82 Mike Leach LS; 9 Dave Zastudil P	Practice squad: 64 Philip Blake C (IR); 19 Dan Buckner WR; 54 Kenny Demens LB; 39 Robert Hughes RB; 60 Tommie Draheim C; 85 Darren Fells TE; 33 Orhian Johnson S; 62 Anthony McCloud NT; 44 Kenny Rowe LB; Reserve: 94 Sam Acho OLB (IR); 97 Lorenzo Alexander OLB (IR); 17 LaRon Byrd WR (IR); 61 Jonathan Cooper G (IR); 48 Dan Giordano OLB (PUP); 87 Jeff King TE (IR); 89 Javone Lawson WR (IR); 32 Tyrann Mathieu FS (IR); 57 Alex Okafor OLB (IR); 72 Everrette Thompson DE (IR); 16 Teddy Williams WR (IR); Rookies in italics 53 active, 12 reserve, 8 practice squad

== Preseason ==
=== Schedule ===
Week	Date	Opponent	Result	Record	Venue	Recap
1	August 9	at Green Bay Packers	W 17–0	1–0	Lambeau Field	Recap
2	August 17	Dallas Cowboys	W 12–7	2–0	University of Phoenix Stadium	Recap
3	August 24	San Diego Chargers	L 7–24	2–1	University of Phoenix Stadium	Recap
4	August 29	at Denver Broncos	W 32–24	3–1	Sports Authority Field at Mile High	Recap

== Regular season ==
=== Schedule ===
Week	Date	Opponent	Result	Record	Venue	Recap
1	September 8	at **St. Louis Rams**	**L** 24–27	0–1	Edward Jones Dome	Recap
2	September 15	Detroit Lions	**W** 25–21	1–1	University of Phoenix Stadium	Recap
3	September 22	at New Orleans Saints	**L** 7–31	1–2	Mercedes-Benz Superdome	Recap
4	September 29	at Tampa Bay Buccaneers	**W** 13–10	2–2	Raymond James Stadium	Recap
5	October 6	Carolina Panthers	**W** 22–6	3–2	University of Phoenix Stadium	Recap
6	October 13	at **San Francisco 49ers**	**L** 20–32	3–3	Candlestick Park	Recap
7	October 17	**Seattle Seahawks**	**L** 22–34	3–4	University of Phoenix Stadium	Recap
8	October 27	Atlanta Falcons	**W** 27–13	4–4	University of Phoenix Stadium	Recap
9	Bye					
10	November 10	Houston Texans	**W** 27–24	5–4	University of Phoenix Stadium	Recap
11	November 17	at Jacksonville Jaguars	**W** 27–14	6–4	EverBank Field	Recap
12	November 24	Indianapolis Colts	**W** 40–11	7–4	University of Phoenix Stadium	Recap
13	December 1	at Philadelphia Eagles	**L** 21–24	7–5	Lincoln Financial Field	Recap
14	December 8	**St. Louis Rams**	**W** 30–10	8–5	University of Phoenix Stadium	Recap
15	December 15	at Tennessee Titans	**W** 37–34 (OT)	9–5	LP Field	Recap
16	December 22	at **Seattle Seahawks**	**W** 17–10	10–5	CenturyLink Field	Recap
17	December 29	**San Francisco 49ers**	**L** 20–23	10–6	University of Phoenix Stadium	Recap

Note: Intra-division opponents are in bold text.

=== Game summaries ===
==== Week 1: at St. Louis Rams ====
Week One: Arizona Cardinals at St. Louis Rams – Game summary

Quarter	1	2	3	4	Total
Cardinals	0	10	14	0	**24**
**Rams**	0	10	3	14	**27**

at Edward Jones Dome, St. Louis, Missouri

- Date: September 8
- Game time: 1:25 p.m.
- Game weather: Played indoors (dome stadium)
- Game attendance: 55,279
- Referee: Clete Blakeman
- TV announcers (Fox): Dick Stockton, Ronde Barber and Kris Budden
- Recap, Game book

Game information

**First quarter**

- No scoring plays.

**Second quarter**

- ARI – Larry Fitzgerald 4-yard pass from Carson Palmer (Jay Feely kick), 14:11. Cardinals 7–0. **Drive: 8 plays, 80 yards, 3:19.**
- STL – Greg Zuerlein 36-yard field goal, 11:20. Cardinals 7–3. **Drive: 7 plays, 61 yards, 2:51.**
- ARI – Jay Feely 30-yard field goal, 5:23. Cardinals 10–3. **Drive: 13 plays, 80 yards, 5:57.**
- STL – Jared Cook 13-yard pass from Sam Bradford (Greg Zuerlein kick), 0:26. Tied 10–10. **Drive: 12 plays, 80 yards, 4:57.**

**Third quarter**

- STL – Greg Zuerlein 25-yard field goal, 13:57. Rams 13–10. **Drive: 4 plays, -3 yards, 0:50.**
- ARI – Dan Williams 2-yard interception return (Jay Feely kick), 10:34. Cardinals 17–13.
- ARI – Larry Fitzgerald 24-yard pass from Carson Palmer (Jay Feely kick), 1:47. Cardinals 24–13. **Drive: 11 plays, 83 yards, 5:16.**

**Fourth quarter**

- STL – Jared Cook 1-yard pass from Sam Bradford (Sam Bradford run), 12:56. Cardinals 24–21. **Drive: 8 plays, 80 yards, 3:51.**
- STL – Greg Zuerlein 38-yard field goal, 9:04. Tied 24–24. **Drive: 4 plays, 2 yards, 1:34.**
- STL – Greg Zuerlein 48-yard field goal, 0:40. Rams 27–24. **Drive: 8 plays, 50 yards, 1:05.**

**Top passers**

- ARI – Carson Palmer – 26/40, 327 yards, 2 TD, INT
- STL – Sam Bradford – 27/38, 299 yards, 2 TD, INT

**Top rushers**

- ARI – Rashard Mendenhall – 16 rushes, 60 yards
- STL – Daryl Richardson – 20 rushes, 63 yards

**Top receivers**

- ARI – Andre Roberts – 8 receptions, 97 yards
- STL – Jared Cook – 7 receptions, 141 yards, 2 TD

==== Week 2: vs. Detroit Lions ====
Week Two: Detroit Lions at Arizona Cardinals – Game summary

Quarter	1	2	3	4	Total
Lions	0	14	7	0	**21**
**Cardinals**	0	10	6	9	**25**

at University of Phoenix Stadium, Glendale, Arizona

- Date: September 15
- Game time: 1:05 p.m.
- Game weather: Played indoors (retractable roof closed)
- Game attendance: 63,400
- Referee: Pete Morelli
- TV announcers (Fox): Sam Rosen, Heath Evans and Molly McGrath
- Recap, Game book

Game information

**First quarter**

- No scoring plays.

**Second quarter**

- ARI – Jay Feely 47-yard field goal, 11:44. Cardinals 3–0. **Drive: 5 plays, 23 yards, 2:40.**
- DET – Calvin Johnson 72-yard pass from Matthew Stafford (David Akers kick), 10:20. Lions 7–3. **Drive: 3 plays, 80 yards, 1:24.**
- ARI – Andre Ellington 36-yard pass from Carson Palmer (Jay Feely kick), 7:32. Cardinals 10–7. **Drive: 6 plays, 80 yards, 2:48.**
- DET – Calvin Johnson 3-yard pass from Matthew Stafford (David Akers kick), 1:55. Lions 14–10. **Drive: 10 plays, 92 yards, 5:37.**

**Third quarter**

- ARI – Jay Feely 23-yard field goal, 10:32. Lions 14–13. **Drive: 4 plays, 2 yards, 1:22.**
- DET – DeAndre Levy 66-yard interception return (David Akers kick), 7:04. Lions 21–13.
- ARI – Jay Feely 43-yard field goal, 4:13. Lions 21–16. **Drive: 7 plays, 55 yards, 2:51.**

**Fourth quarter**

- ARI – Jay Feely 33-yard field goal, 14:17. Lions 21–19. **Drive: 9 plays, 59 yards, 3:21.**
- ARI – Rashard Mendenhall 1-yard run (pass failed), 1:59. Cardinals 25–21. **Drive: 7 plays, 61 yards, 2:29.**

**Top passers**

- DET – Matthew Stafford – 24/36, 278 yards, 2 TD
- ARI – Carson Palmer – 22/39, 248 yards, TD, INT

**Top rushers**

- DET – Joique Bell – 8 rushes, 31 yards
- ARI – Rashard Mendenhall – 15 rushes, 66 yards, TD

**Top receivers**

- DET – Calvin Johnson – 6 receptions, 116 yards, 2 TD
- ARI – Andre Ellington – 2 receptions, 42 yards, TD

==== Week 3: at New Orleans Saints ====
Week Three: Arizona Cardinals at New Orleans Saints – Game summary

Quarter	1	2	3	4	Total
Cardinals	7	0	0	0	**7**
**Saints**	7	7	3	14	**31**

at Mercedes-Benz Superdome, New Orleans, Louisiana

- Date: September 22
- Game time: 10:00 a.m.
- Game weather: Played indoors (dome stadium)
- Game attendance: 73,057
- Referee: Walt Coleman
- TV announcers (Fox): Sam Rosen, Heath Evans and Molly McGrath
- Recap, Game book

Game information

**First quarter**

- ARI – Alfonso Smith 3-yard run (Jay Feely kick), 9:13. Cardinals 7–0. **Drive: 11 plays, 80 yards, 5:47.**
- NO – Robert Meachem 27-yard pass from Drew Brees (Garrett Hartley kick), 5:28. Tied 7–7. **Drive: 8 plays, 80 yards, 3:45.**

**Second quarter**

- NO – Jimmy Graham 16-yard pass from Drew Brees (Garrett Hartley kick), 2:52. Saints 14–7. **Drive: 6 plays, 58 yards, 2:16.**

**Third quarter**

- NO – Garrett Hartley 31-yard field goal, 4:03. Saints 17–7. **Drive: 8 plays, 67 yards, 3:48.**

**Fourth quarter**

- NO – Drew Brees 7-yard run (Garrett Hartley kick), 14:42. Saints 24–7. **Drive: 7 plays, 39 yards, 2:18.**
- NO – Jimmy Graham 7-yard pass from Drew Brees (Garrett Hartley kick), 5:25. Saints 31–7. **Drive: 12 plays, 63 yards, 6:31.**

**Top passers**

- ARI – Carson Palmer – 18/35, 187 yards, 2 INT
- NO – Drew Brees – 29/46, 342 yards, 3 TD, INT

**Top rushers**

- ARI – Rashard Mendenhall – 9 rushes, 29 yards
- NO – Khiry Robinson – 4 rushes, 38 yards

**Top receivers**

- ARI – Larry Fitzgerald – 5 receptions, 64 yards
- NO – Jimmy Graham – 9 receptions, 134 yards, 2 TD

==== Week 4: at Tampa Bay Buccaneers ====
Week Four: Arizona Cardinals at Tampa Bay Buccaneers – Game summary

Quarter	1	2	3	4	Total
**Cardinals**	0	0	0	13	**13**
Buccaneers	7	3	0	0	**10**

at Raymond James Stadium, Tampa, Florida

- Date: September 29
- Game time: 10:00 a.m.
- Game weather: 84 °F (29 °C), sunny
- Game attendance: 44,956
- Referee: Gene Steratore
- TV announcers (Fox): Sam Rosen, Heath Evans and Molly McGrath
- Recap, Game book

Game information

**First quarter**

- TB – Mike Williams 8-yard pass from Mike Glennon (Rian Lindell kick), 6:17. Buccaneers 7–0. **Drive: 6 plays, 41 yards, 2:26.**

**Second quarter**

- TB – Rian Lindell 50-yard field goal, 0:27. Buccaneers 10–0. **Drive: 13 plays, 61 yards, 4:23.**

**Third quarter**

- No scoring plays.

**Fourth quarter**

- ARI – Jay Feely 42-yard field goal, 11:16. Buccaneers 10–3. **Drive: 6 plays, 26 yards, 2:14.**
- ARI – Larry Fitzgerald 13-yard pass from Carson Palmer (Jay Feely kick), 3:06. Tied 10–10. **Drive: 1 play, 13 yards, 0:06.**
- ARI – Jay Feely 27-yard field goal, 1:29. Cardinals 13–10. **Drive: 5 plays, 29 yards, 0:27.**

**Top passers**

- ARI – Carson Palmer – 21/38, 248 yards, TD, 2 INT
- TB – Mike Glennon – 24/43, 193 yards, TD, 2 INT

**Top rushers**

- ARI – Andre Ellington – 4 rushes, 29 yards
- TB – Doug Martin – 27 rushes, 45 yards

**Top receivers**

- ARI – Michael Floyd – 5 receptions, 87 yards
- TB – Tim Wright – 5 receptions, 41 yards

==== Week 5: vs. Carolina Panthers ====
Week Five: Carolina Panthers at Arizona Cardinals – Game summary

Quarter	1	2	3	4	Total
Panthers	3	3	0	0	**6**
**Cardinals**	0	3	9	10	**22**

at University of Phoenix Stadium, Glendale, Arizona

- Date: October 6
- Game time: 1:05 p.m.
- Game weather: Played indoors (retractable roof closed)
- Game attendance: 60,426
- Referee: John Parry
- TV announcers (Fox): Chris Myers, Tim Ryan and Jennifer Hale
- Recap, Game book

Game information

**First quarter**

- CAR – Graham Gano 22-yard field goal, 7:27. Panthers 3–0. **Drive: 10 plays, 76 yards, 5:26.**

**Second quarter**

- ARI – Jay Feely 42-yard field goal, 8:29. Tied 3–3. **Drive: 6 plays, 22 yards, 2:38.**
- CAR – Graham Gano 51-yard field goal, 0:00. Panthers 6–3. **Drive: 5 plays, 47 yards, 0:32.**

**Third quarter**

- ARI – Rashard Mendenhall 1-yard run (Jay Feely kick), 5:48. Cardinals 10–6. **Drive: 10 plays, 85 yards, 5:32.**
- ARI – Cam Newton sacked in endzone by Calais Campbell for a safety, 5:28. Cardinals 12–6.

'Fourth quarter

- ARI – Jay Feely 50-yard field goal, 3:38. Cardinals 15–6. **Drive: 11 plays, 41 yards, 6:23.**
- ARI – Jim Dray 7-yard pass from Carson Palmer (Jay Feely kick), 2:23. Cardinals 22–6. **Drive: 3 plays, 9 yards, 0:15.**

**Top passers**

- CAR – Cam Newton – 21/39, 308 yards, 3 INT
- ARI – Carson Palmer – 19/28, 175 yards, TD, 3 INT

**Top rushers**

- CAR – DeAngelo Williams – 12 rushes, 39 yards
- ARI – Andre Ellington – 7 rushes, 52 yards

**Top receivers**

- CAR – Greg Olsen – 5 receptions, 79 yards
- ARI – Michael Floyd – 5 receptions, 61 yards

==== Week 6: at San Francisco 49ers ====
Week Six: Arizona Cardinals at San Francisco 49ers – Game summary

Quarter	1	2	3	4	Total
Cardinals	7	7	6	0	**20**
**49ers**	6	16	0	10	**32**

at Candlestick Park, San Francisco, California

- Date: October 13
- Game time: 1:25 p.m.
- Game weather: 65 °F (18 °C), sunny
- Game attendance: 69,732
- Referee: Scott Green
- TV announcers (Fox): Kevin Burkhardt, John Lynch and Molly McGrath
- Recap, Game book

Game information

**First quarter**

- SF – Phil Dawson 35-yard field goal, 9:37. 49ers 3–0. **Drive: 4 plays, -10 yards, 1:00.**
- SF – Phil Dawson 26-yard field goal, 4:31. 49ers 6–0. **Drive: 4 plays, 3 yards, 1:35.**
- ARI – Larry Fitzgerald 75-yard pass from Carson Palmer (Jay Feely kick), 3:06. Cardinals 7–6. **Drive: 3 plays, 80 yards, 1:25.**

**Second quarter**

- SF – Carson Palmer sacked in the endzone by Corey Lemonier for a safety, 9:22. 49ers 8–7.
- SF – Vernon Davis 61-yard pass from Colin Kaepernick (Phil Dawson kick), 8:31. 49ers 15–7. **Drive: 2 plays, 71 yards, 0:51.**
- ARI – Andre Ellington 11-yard run (Jay Feely kick), 7:03. 49ers 15–14. **Drive: 3 plays, 80 yards, 1:28.**
- SF – Vernon Davis 35-yard pass from Colin Kaepernick (Phil Dawson kick), 1:55. 49ers 22–14. **Drive: 3 plays, 58 yards, 0:59.**

**Third quarter**

- ARI – Michael Floyd 10-yard pass from Carson Palmer (pass failed), 8:12. 49ers 22–20. **Drive: 9 plays, 61 yards, 4:33.**

**Fourth quarter**

- SF – Kendall Hunter 6-yard run (Phil Dawson kick), 6:35. 49ers 29–20. **Drive: 18 plays, 89 yards, 9:32.**
- SF – Phil Dawson 44-yard field goal, 4:15. 49ers 32–20. **Drive: 4 plays, 5 yards, 1:41.**

**Top passers**

- ARI – Carson Palmer – 25/41, 298 yards, 2 TD, 2 INT
- SF – Colin Kaepernick – 16/29, 252 yards, 2 TD, INT

**Top rushers**

- ARI – Andre Ellington – 7 rushes, 56 yards, TD
- SF – Frank Gore – 25 rushes, 101 yards

**Top receivers**

- ARI – Larry Fitzgerald – 6 receptions, 117 yards, TD
- SF – Vernon Davis – 8 receptions, 180 yards, 2 TD

==== Week 7: vs. Seattle Seahawks ====
Week Seven: Seattle Seahawks at Arizona Cardinals – Game summary

Quarter	1	2	3	4	Total
**Seahawks**	7	10	14	3	**34**
Cardinals	0	10	3	9	**22**

at University of Phoenix Stadium, Glendale, Arizona

- Date: October 17
- Game time: 5:25 p.m.
- Game weather: 82 °F (28 °C), clear skies (retractable roof open)
- Game attendance: 61,200
- Referee: Terry McAulay
- TV announcers (NFLN): Brad Nessler, Mike Mayock and Alex Flanagan
- Recap, Game book

Game information

**First quarter**

- SEA – Sidney Rice 31-yard pass from Russell Wilson (Stephen Hauschka kick), 7:13. Seahawks 7–0. **Drive: 5 plays, 83 yards, 2:31.**

**Second quarter**

- SEA – Zach Miller 15-yard pass from Russell Wilson (Stephen Hauschka kick), 13:25. Seahawks 14–0. **Drive: 11 plays, 72 yards, 5:26.**
- ARI – Jay Feely 49-yard field goal, 4:02. Seahawks 14–3. **Drive: 11 plays, 26 yards, 6:10.**
- ARI – Rashard Mendenhall 3-yard run (Jay Feely kick), 3:40. Seahawks 14–10. **Drive: 1 play, 3 yards, 0:03.**
- SEA – Stephen Hauschka 51-yard field goal, 0:05. Seahawks 17–10. **Drive: 12 plays, 47 yards, 3:35.**

**Third quarter**

- ARI – Jay Feely 52-yard field goal, 11:48. Seahawks 17–13. **Drive: 5 plays, 17 yards, 1:09.**
- SEA – Kellen Davis 1-yard run (Stephen Hauschka kick), 7:48. Seahawks 24–13. **Drive: 10 plays, 80 yards, 4:00.**
- SEA – Marshawn Lynch 2-yard run (Stephen Hauschka kick), 3:52. Seahawks 31–13. **Drive: 2 plays, 1 yard, 0:51.**

**Fourth quarter**

- ARI – Jay Feely 22-yard field goal, 14:41. Seahawks 31–16. **Drive: 6 plays, 11 yards, 0:39.**
- SEA – Stephen Hauschka 42-yard field goal, 10:21. Seahawks 34–16. **Drive: 8 plays, 56 yards, 4:20.**
- ARI – Jaron Brown 8-yard pass from Carson Palmer (pass failed), 4:34. Seahawks 34–22. **Drive: 8 plays, 71 yards, 3:28.**

**Top passers**

- SEA – Russell Wilson – 18/29, 235 yards, 3 TD
- ARI – Carson Palmer – 30/45, 258 yards, TD, 2 INT

**Top rushers**

- SEA – Marshawn Lynch – 21 rushes, 91 yards, TD
- ARI – Rashard Mendenhall – 13 rushes, 22 yards, TD

**Top receivers**

- SEA – Golden Tate – 4 receptions, 77 yards
- ARI – Michael Floyd – 5 receptions, 58 yards

==== Week 8: vs. Atlanta Falcons ====
Week Eight: Atlanta Falcons at Arizona Cardinals – Game summary

Quarter	1	2	3	4	Total
Falcons	3	3	0	7	**13**
**Cardinals**	0	21	3	3	**27**

at University of Phoenix Stadium, Glendale, Arizona

- Date: October 27
- Game time: 1:25 p.m.
- Game weather: Played indoors (retractable roof closed)
- Game attendance: 60,671
- Referee: Mike Carey
- TV announcers (Fox): Kevin Burkhardt, John Lynch and Molly McGrath
- Recap, Game book

Game information

**First quarter**

- ATL – Matt Bryant 24-yard field goal, 3:23. Falcons 3–0. **Drive: 5 plays, 25 yards, 2:14.**

**Second quarter**

- ARI – Larry Fitzgerald 10-yard pass from Carson Palmer (Jay Feely kick), 14:55. Cardinals 7–3. **Drive: 6 plays, 80 yards, 3:28.**
- ATL – Matt Bryant 30-yard field goal, 7:38. Cardinals 7–6. **Drive: 15 plays, 66 yards, 7:17.**
- ARI – Andre Ellington 80-yard run (Jay Feely kick), 7:25. Cardinals 14–6. **Drive: 1 play, 80 yards, 0:13.**
- ARI – Michael Floyd 15-yard pass from Carson Palmer (Jay Feely kick), 1:55. Cardinals 21–6. **Drive: 6 plays, 78 yards, 3:19.**

**Third quarter**

- ARI – Jay Feely 39-yard field goal, 7:07. Cardinals 24–6. **Drive: 4 plays, 1 yard, 1:43.**

**Fourth quarter**

- ARI – Jay Feely 38-yard field goal, 8:40. Cardinals 27–6. **Drive: 7 plays, 20 yards, 3:20.**
- ATL – Drew Davis 4-yard pass from Matt Ryan (Matt Bryant kick), 4:38. Cardinals 27–13. **Drive: 14 plays, 80 yards, 4:02.**

**Top passers**

- ATL – Matt Ryan – 34/61, 301 yards, TD, 4 INT
- ARI – Carson Palmer – 13/18, 172 yards, 2 TD, INT

**Top rushers**

- ATL – Matt Ryan – 1 rush, 13 yards
- ARI – Andre Ellington – 15 rushes, 154 yards, TD

**Top receivers**

- ATL – Harry Douglas – 12 receptions, 121 yards
- ARI – Teddy Williams – 1 reception, 51 yards

==== Week 10: vs. Houston Texans ====
Week Ten: Houston Texans at Arizona Cardinals – Game summary

Quarter	1	2	3	4	Total
Texans	7	10	0	7	**24**
**Cardinals**	7	7	6	7	**27**

at University of Phoenix Stadium, Glendale, Arizona

- Date: November 10
- Game time: 2:25 p.m. MST
- Game weather: Played indoors (retractable roof closed)
- Game attendance: 60,845
- Referee: Gene Steratore
- TV announcers (CBS): Kevin Harlan and Solomon Wilcots
- Recap, Game book

Game information

**First quarter**

- ARI – Matt Shaughnessy 6-yard fumble return (Jay Feely kick), 14:46. Cardinals 7–0.
- HOU – Andre Johnson 7-yard pass from Case Keenum (Randy Bullock kick), 5:55. Tied 7–7. **Drive: 8 plays, 49 yards, 4:52.**

**Second quarter**

- ARI – Rob Housler 12-yard pass from Carson Palmer (Jay Feely kick), 13:57. Cardinals 14–7. **Drive: 6 plays, 58 yards, 2:28.**
- HOU – Ryan Griffin 2-yard pass from Case Keenum (Randy Bullock kick), 9:37. Tied 14–14. **Drive: 9 plays, 80 yards, 4:20.**
- HOU – Randy Bullock 48-yard field goal, 6:31. Texans 17–14. **Drive: 6 plays, 15 yards, 2:09.**

**Third quarter**

- ARI – Jay Feely 35-yard field goal, 6:06. Tied 17–17. **Drive: 10 plays, 43 yards, 5:12.**
- ARI – Jay Feely 21-yard field goal, 0:02. Cardinals 20–17. **Drive: 9 plays, 58 yards, 4:23.**

**Fourth quarter**

- ARI – Andre Roberts 19-yard pass from Carson Palmer (Jay Feely kick), 6:42. Cardinals 27–17. **Drive: 9 plays, 67 yards, 4:48.**
- HOU – Andre Johnson 5-yard pass from Case Keenum (Randy Bullock kick), 4:34. Cardinals 27–24. **Drive: 3 plays, 5 yards, 0:12.**

**Top passers**

- HOU – Case Keenum – 22/43, 201 yards, 3 TD
- ARI – Carson Palmer – 20/32, 241 yards, 2 TD, INT

**Top rushers**

- HOU – Ben Tate – 15 rushes, 56 yards
- ARI – Andre Ellington – 11 rushes, 55 yards

**Top receivers**

- HOU – DeAndre Hopkins – 6 receptions, 69 yards
- ARI – Andre Roberts – 5 receptions, 72 yards, TD

==== Week 11: at Jacksonville Jaguars ====
Week Eleven: Arizona Cardinals at Jacksonville Jaguars – Game summary

Quarter	1	2	3	4	Total
**Cardinals**	7	7	10	3	**27**
Jaguars	14	0	0	0	**14**

at EverBank Field, Jacksonville, Florida

- Date: November 17
- Game time: 11:00 am. MST
- Game weather: 76 °F (24 °C), 20% chance of rain
- Game attendance: 59,862
- Referee: Jeff Triplette
- TV announcers (Fox): Dick Stockton, Ronde Barber and Kris Budden
- Recap, Game book

Game information

**First quarter**

- JAX – Danny Noble 62-yard pass from Chad Henne (Josh Scobee kick), 12:53. Jaguars 7–0. **Drive: 4 plays, 71 yards, 2:07.**
- ARI – Larry Fitzgerald 14-yard pass from Carson Palmer (Jay Feely kick), 7:50. Tied 7–7. **Drive: 10 plays, 80 yards, 5:03.**
- JAX – Maurice Jones-Drew 1-yard run (Josh Scobee kick), 5:08. Jaguars 14–7. **Drive: 7 plays, 46 yards, 2:42.**

**Second quarter**

- ARI – Rashard Mendenhall 5-yard run (Jay Feely kick), 1:55. Tied 14–14. **Drive: 5 plays, 70 yards, 2:06.**

**Third quarter**

- ARI – Jay Feely 21-yard field goal, 10:36. Cardinals 17–14. **Drive: 9 plays, 77 yards, 4:24.**
- ARI – Michael Floyd 91-yard pass from Carson Palmer (Jay Feely kick), 7:29. Cardinals 24–14. **Drive: 3 plays, 91 yards, 1:29.**

**Fourth quarter**

- ARI – Jay Feely 32-yard field goal, 7:03. Cardinals 27–14. **Drive: 5 plays, 8 yards, 2:16.**

**Top passers**

- ARI – Carson Palmer – 30/42, 419 yards, 2 TD
- JAX – Chad Henne – 27/42, 255 yards, TD, 2 INT

**Top rushers**

- ARI – Rashard Mendenhall – 12 rushes, 14 yards, TD
- JAX – Maurice Jones-Drew – 14 rushes, 23 yards, TD

**Top receivers**

- ARI – Michael Floyd – 6 receptions, 193 yards, TD
- JAX – Danny Noble – 1 reception, 62 yards, TD

==== Week 12: vs. Indianapolis Colts ====
Week Twelve: Indianapolis Colts at Arizona Cardinals – Game summary

Quarter	1	2	3	4	Total
Colts	3	0	0	8	**11**
**Cardinals**	7	20	7	6	**40**

at University of Phoenix Stadium, Glendale, Arizona

- Date: November 24
- Game time: 2:05 pm. MST
- Game weather: Played indoors (retractable roof closed)
- Game attendance: 60,882
- Referee: Bill Leavy
- TV announcers (CBS): Ian Eagle and Dan Fouts
- Recap, Game book

Game information

**First quarter**

- ARI – Larry Fitzgerald 4-yard pass from Carson Palmer (Jay Feely kick), 10:02. Cardinals 7–0. **Drive: 10 plays, 80 yards, 4:58.**
- IND – Adam Vinatieri 27-yard field goal, 1:15. Cardinals 7–3. **Drive: 9 plays, 71 yards, 4:23.**

**Second quarter**

- ARI – Larry Fitzgerald 26-yard pass from Carson Palmer (Jay Feely kick), 13:29. Cardinals 14–3. **Drive: 5 plays, 80 yards, 2:46.**
- ARI – Jay Feely 48-yard field goal, 8:15. Cardinals 17–3. **Drive: 9 plays, 38 yards, 4:15.**
- ARI – Karlos Dansby 22-yard interception return (Jay Feely kick), 7:58. Cardinals 24–3.
- ARI – Jay Feely 50-yard field goal, 0:00. Cardinals 27–3. **Drive: 7 plays, 19 yards, 1:41.**

**Third quarter**

- ARI – Rashard Mendenhall 5-yard run (Jay Feely kick), 5:57. Cardinals 34–3. **Drive: 11 plays, 64 yards, 5:11.**

**Fourth quarter**

- IND – Coby Fleener 17-yard pass from Andrew Luck (Andrew Luck-Darrius Heyward-Bey pass), 10:26. Cardinals 34–11. **Drive: 11 plays, 84 yards, 4:22.**
- ARI – Jay Feely 21-yard field goal, 7:20. Cardinals 37–11. **Drive: 7 plays, 36 yards, 3:06.**
- ARI – Jay Feely 25-yard field goal, 2:17. Cardinals 40–11. **Drive: 7 plays, 33 yards, 3:40.**

**Top passers**

- IND – Andrew Luck – 20/39, 163 yards, TD, INT
- ARI – Carson Palmer – 26/37, 314 yards, 2 TD

**Top rushers**

- IND – Dan Herron – 4 rushes, 33 yards
- ARI – Rashard Mendenhall – 13 rushes, 54 yards, TD

**Top receivers**

- IND – Coby Fleener – 4 receptions, 55 yards, TD
- ARI – Michael Floyd – 7 receptions, 104 yards

==== Week 13: at Philadelphia Eagles ====
Week Thirteen: Arizona Cardinals at Philadelphia Eagles – Game summary

Quarter	1	2	3	4	Total
Cardinals	0	7	7	7	**21**
**Eagles**	7	10	7	0	**24**

at Lincoln Financial Field, Philadelphia, Pennsylvania

- Date: December 1
- Game time: 11:00 am. MST
- Game weather: 46 °F (8 °C), sunny
- Game attendance: 69,144
- Referee: Tony Corrente
- TV announcers (Fox): Kenny Albert, Daryl Johnston and Tony Siragusa
- Recap, Game book

Game information

**First quarter**

- PHI – Zach Ertz 6-yard pass from Nick Foles (Alex Henery kick), 12:30. Eagles 7–0. **Drive: 4 plays, 25 yards, 0:56.**

**Second quarter**

- ARI – Larry Fitzgerald 43-yard pass from Carson Palmer (Jay Feely kick), 7:50. Tied 7–7. **Drive: 8 plays, 57 yards, 4:13.**
- PHI – Alex Henery 32-yard field goal, 3:59. Eagles 10–7. **Drive: 9 plays, 64 yards, 3:51.**
- PHI – Brent Celek 1-yard pass from Nick Foles (Alex Henery kick), 0:15. Eagles 17–7. **Drive: 9 plays, 78 yards, 2:07.**

**Third quarter**

- PHI – Zach Ertz 24-yard pass from Nick Foles (Alex Henery kick), 10:16. Eagles 24–7. **Drive: 13 plays, 80 yards, 4:44.**
- ARI – Michael Floyd 23-yard pass from Carson Palmer (Jay Feely kick), 5:14. Eagles 24–14. **Drive: 10 plays, 80 yards, 5:02.**

**Fourth quarter**

- ARI – Jim Dray 3-yard pass from Carson Palmer (Jay Feely kick), 4:45. Eagles 24–21. **Drive: 8 plays, 86 yards, 2:53.**

**Top passers**

- ARI – Carson Palmer – 24/41, 302 yards, 3 TD, 2 INT
- PHI – Nick Foles – 21/34, 237 yards, 3 TD

**Top rushers**

- ARI – Rashard Mendenhall – 18 rushes, 76 yards
- PHI – LeSean McCoy – 19 rushes, 79 yards

**Top receivers**

- ARI – Michael Floyd – 5 receptions, 99 yards, TD
- PHI – Zach Ertz – 5 receptions, 68 yards, 2 TD

==== Week 14: vs. St. Louis Rams ====
Week Fourteen: St. Louis Rams at Arizona Cardinals – Game summary

Quarter	1	2	3	4	Total
Rams	3	0	0	7	**10**
**Cardinals**	7	7	9	7	**30**

at University of Phoenix Stadium, Glendale, Arizona

- Date: December 8
- Game time: 2:25 pm. MST
- Game weather: 56 °F (13 °C), (retractable roof open)
- Game attendance: 60,643
- Referee: Walt Coleman
- TV announcers (Fox): Dick Stockton, Ronde Barber and Kris Budden
- Recap, Game book

Game information

**First quarter**

- ARI – Rashard Mendenhall 3-yard run (Jay Feely kick), 10:32. Cardinals 7–0. **Drive: 8 plays, 80 yards, 4:28.**
- STL – Greg Zuerlein 44-yard field goal, 6:12. Cardinals 7–3. **Drive: 8 plays, 49 yards, 4:20.**

**Second quarter**

- ARI – Larry Fitzgerald 7-yard pass from Carson Palmer (Jay Feely kick), 0:50. Cardinals 14–3. **Drive: 10 plays, 80 yards, 3:41.**

**Third quarter**

- ARI – Karlos Dansby 23-yard interception return (Jay Feely kick), 14:42. Cardinals 21–3.
- ARI – Kellen Clemens sacked in the end zone by John Abraham for a safety, 9:10. Cardinals 23–3.

**Fourth quarter**

- STL – Zac Stacy 1-yard run (Greg Zuerlein kick), 14:57. Cardinals 23–10. **Drive: 3 plays, 60 yards, 1:09.**
- ARI – Andre Ellington 6-yard run (Jay Feely kick), 1:55. Cardinals 30–10. **Drive: 6 plays, 27 yards, 2:25.**

**Top passers**

- STL – Kellen Clemens – 16/27, 181 yards, 2 INT
- ARI – Carson Palmer – 27/32, 269 yards, TD

**Top rushers**

- STL – Tavon Austin – 1 rush, 56 yards
- ARI – Andre Ellington – 11 rushes, 46 yards, TD

**Top receivers**

- STL – Jared Cook – 3 receptions, 49 yards
- ARI – Larry Fitzgerald – 12 receptions, 96 yards, TD

==== Week 15: at Tennessee Titans ====
Week Fifteen: Arizona Cardinals at Tennessee Titans – Game summary

Quarter	1	2	3	4	OT	Total
**Cardinals**	7	3	10	14	3	**37**
Titans	10	0	7	17	0	**34**

at LP Field, Nashville, Tennessee

- Date: December 15
- Game time: 2:25 pm. MST
- Game weather: 37 °F (3 °C), cloudy
- Game attendance: 69,143
- Referee: Pete Morelli
- TV announcers (Fox): Justin Kutcher, Charles Davis and Kristina Pink
- Recap, Game book

Game information

**First quarter**

- TEN – Rob Bironas 45-yard field goal, 9:34. Titans 3–0. **Drive: 8 plays, 37 yards, 4:28.**
- ARI – Rashard Mendenhall 1-yard run (Jay Feely kick), 4:30. Cardinals 7–3. **Drive: 9 plays, 77 yards, 5:04.**
- TEN – Chris Johnson 25-yard pass from Ryan Fitzpatrick (Rob Bironas kick), 0:00. Titans 10–7. **Drive: 8 plays, 68 yards, 4:30.**

**Second quarter**

- ARI – Jay Feely 25-yard field goal, 7:21. Tied 10–10. **Drive: 13 plays, 67 yards, 7:39.**

**Third quarter**

- ARI – Jay Feely 47-yard field goal, 13:32. Cardinals 13–10. **Drive: 4 plays, -6 yards, 1:28.**
- TEN – Delanie Walker 1-yard pass from Ryan Fitzpatrick (Rob Bironas kick), 6:16. Titans 17–13. **Drive: 15 plays, 74 yards, 7:16.**
- ARI – Jake Ballard 6-yard pass from Carson Palmer (Jay Feely kick), 2:14. Cardinals 20–17. **Drive: 7 plays, 72 yards, 4:02.**

**Fourth quarter**

- ARI – Rashard Mendenhall 1-yard run (Jay Feely kick), 6:50. Cardinals 27–17. **Drive: 11 plays, 60 yards, 5:07.**
- ARI – Antoine Cason 20-yard interception return (Jay Feely kick), 6:13. Cardinals 34–17.
- TEN – Michael Preston 10-yard pass from Ryan Fitzpatrick (Rob Bironas kick), 3:12. Cardinals 34–24. **Drive: 9 plays, 67 yards, 3:01.**
- TEN – Rob Bironas 24-yard field goal, 0:47. Cardinals 34–27. **Drive: 10 plays, 87 yards, 1:55.**
- TEN – Michael Preston 8-yard pass from Ryan Fitzpatrick (Rob Bironas kick), 0:10. Tied 34–34. **Drive: 5 plays, 54 yards, 0:37.**

**Overtime**

- ARI – Jay Feely 41-yard field goal, 10:18. Cardinals 37–34. **Drive: 7 plays, 31 yards, 3:37.**

**Top passers**

- ARI – Carson Palmer – 20/31, 231 yards, TD
- TEN – Ryan Fitzpatrick – 36/58, 402 yards, 4 TD, 2 INT

**Top rushers**

- ARI – Andre Ellington – 10 rushes, 71 yards
- TEN – Chris Johnson – 13 rushes, 40 yards

**Top receivers**

- ARI – Andre Ellington – 4 receptions, 87 yards
- TEN – Kendall Wright – 12 receptions, 150 yards

With the win, the Cardinals were the only NFC West team to defeat all of their AFC South opponents.

==== Week 16: at Seattle Seahawks ====
Week Sixteen: Arizona Cardinals at Seattle Seahawks – Game summary

Quarter	1	2	3	4	Total
**Cardinals**	0	3	3	11	**17**
Seahawks	0	3	0	7	**10**

at CenturyLink Field, Seattle, Washington

- Date: December 22
- Game time: 2:05 pm. MST
- Game weather: 48 °F (9 °C), cloudy
- Game attendance: 68,266
- Referee: Scott Green
- TV announcers (Fox): Chris Myers, Tim Ryan and Jennifer Hale
- Recap, Game book

Game information

**First quarter**

- No scoring plays.

**Second quarter**

- SEA – Stephen Hauschka 27-yard field goal, 13:42. Seahawks 3–0. **Drive: 13 plays, 70 yards, 6:02.**
- ARI – Jay Feely 39-yard field goal, 2:15. Tied 3–3. **Drive: 16 plays, 75 yards, 8:21.**

**Third quarter**

- ARI – Jay Feely 46-yard field goal, 0:27. Cardinals 6–3. **Drive: 6 plays, 27 yards, 3:03.**

**Fourth quarter**

- ARI – Jay Feely 26-yard field goal, 10:39. Cardinals 9–3. **Drive: 5 plays, 45 yards, 2:34.**
- SEA – Zach Miller 11-yard pass from Russell Wilson (Stephen Hauschka kick), 7:26. Seahawks 10–9. **Drive: 6 plays, 61 yards, 3:13.**
- ARI – Michael Floyd 31-yard pass from Carson Palmer (Rashard Mendenhall run), 2:13. Cardinals 17–10. **Drive: 10 plays, 80 yards, 5:13.**

**Top passers**

- ARI – Carson Palmer – 13/25, 178 yards, TD, 4 INT
- SEA – Russell Wilson – 11/27, 108 yards, TD, INT

**Top rushers**

- ARI – Andre Ellington – 15 rushes, 64 yards
- SEA – Marshawn Lynch – 18 rushes, 71 yards

**Top receivers**

- ARI – Brittan Golden – 1 reception, 63 yards
- SEA – Jermaine Kearse – 3 receptions, 38 yards

==== Week 17: vs. San Francisco 49ers ====
Week Seventeen: San Francisco 49ers at Arizona Cardinals – Game summary

Quarter	1	2	3	4	Total
**49ers**	17	0	0	6	**23**
Cardinals	0	7	0	13	**20**

at University of Phoenix Stadium, Glendale, Arizona

- Date: December 29
- Game time: 2:25 pm. MST
- Game weather: 64 °F (18 °C), sunny (retractable roof open)
- Game attendance: 63,570
- Referee: Walt Anderson
- TV announcers (Fox): Kenny Albert, Daryl Johnston and Tony Siragusa
- Recap, Game book

Game information

**First quarter**

- SF – Phil Dawson 27-yard field goal, 10:39. 49ers 3–0. **Drive: 8 plays, 53 yards, 2:55.**
- SF – Anquan Boldin 4-yard pass from Colin Kaepernick (Phil Dawson kick), 8:33. 49ers 10–0. **Drive: 5 plays, 22 yards, 1:15.**
- SF – Vernon Davis 3-yard pass from Colin Kaepernick (Phil Dawson kick), 0:52. 49ers 17–0. **Drive: 4 plays, 72 yards, 2:23.**

**Second quarter**

- ARI – Jake Ballard 1-yard pass from Carson Palmer (Jay Feely kick), 4:46. 49ers 17–7. **Drive: 10 plays, 88 yards, 5:44.**

**Third quarter**

- No scoring plays.

**Fourth quarter**

- ARI – Jay Feely 49-yard field goal, 14:47. 49ers 17–10. **Drive: 11 plays, 54 yards, 4:09.**
- ARI – Andre Roberts 34-yard pass from Carson Palmer (Jay Feely kick), 3:20. Tied 17–17. **Drive: 5 plays, 60 yards, 2:28.**
- SF – Phil Dawson 56-yard field goal, 1:45. 49ers 20–17. **Drive: 7 plays, 41 yards, 1:35.**
- ARI – Jay Feely 43-yard field goal, 0:29. Tied 20–20. **Drive: 8 plays, 55 yards, 1:16.**
- SF – Phil Dawson 40-yard field goal, 0:00. 49ers 23–20. **Drive: 3 plays, 42 yards, 0:29.**

**Top passers**

- SF – Colin Kaepernick – 21/34, 310 yards, 2 TD
- ARI – Carson Palmer – 28/49, 407 yards, 2 TD, INT

**Top rushers**

- SF – Quinton Patton – 1 rush, 26 yards
- ARI – Rashard Mendenhall – 10 rushes, 47 yards

**Top receivers**

- SF – Anquan Boldin – 9 catches, 149 yards, 1 TD
- ARI – Larry Fitzgerald – 6 catches, 113 yards

The Cardinals finished their regular season at home against the 49ers in hopes of making the playoffs needing not only a win over the 49ers, but also a long shot upset by the Buccaneers over the Saints. After being behind 17–7 at halftime, the Cardinals came back to tie the game but were beaten by their division rivals on a game-winning field goal and finished in 3rd place, barely missing out as they needed to beat the 49ers to win the NFC's last playoff spot. However, even if they had won, they would not have qualified for the playoffs, since the Saints easily defeated the Buccaneers 42–17. They would finish their season 10–6, becoming the league's only team with a winning record to not make the playoffs.

== Standings ==
=== Division ===
NFC West
	W	L	T	PCT	DIV	CONF	PF	PA	STK
^{(1)} Seattle Seahawks	13	3	0	.813	4–2	10–2	417	231	W1
^{(5)} San Francisco 49ers	12	4	0	.750	5–1	9–3	406	272	W6
Arizona Cardinals	10	6	0	.625	2–4	6–6	379	324	L1
St. Louis Rams	7	9	0	.438	1–5	4–8	348	364	L1

=== Conference ===
NFC
#	Team	Division	W	L	T	PCT	DIV	CONF	SOS	SOV	STK
Division winners
1	Seattle Seahawks	West	13	3	0	.813	4–2	10–2	.490	.445	W1
2	Carolina Panthers	South	12	4	0	.750	5–1	9–3	.494	.451	W3
3	Philadelphia Eagles	East	10	6	0	.625	4–2	9–3	.453	.391	W2
4	Green Bay Packers	North	8	7	1	.531	3–2–1	6–5–1	.453	.371	W1
Wild cards
5	San Francisco 49ers	West	12	4	0	.750	5–1	9–3	.494	.414	W6
6	New Orleans Saints	South	11	5	0	.688	5–1	9–3	.516	.455	W1
Did not qualify for the postseason
7	Arizona Cardinals	West	10	6	0	.625	2–4	6–6	.531	.444	L1
8 (Note: Chicago defeated Dallas head-to-head (Week 14, 45–28).)	Chicago Bears	North	8	8	0	.500	2–4	4–8	.465	.469	L2
9	Dallas Cowboys	East	8	8	0	.500	5–1	7–5	.484	.363	L1
10 (Note: The NY Giants and Detroit finished with a better conference record than St. Louis.) (Note: The NY Giants defeated Detroit head-to-head (Week 16, 23–20 (OT)).)	New York Giants	East	7	9	0	.438	3–3	6–6	.520	.366	W2
11 (Note: Detroit finished with a better conference record than St. Louis.)	Detroit Lions	North	7	9	0	.438	4–2	6–6	.457	.402	L4
12	St. Louis Rams	West	7	9	0	.438	1–5	4–8	.551	.446	L1
13	Minnesota Vikings	North	5	10	1	.344	2–3–1	4–7–1	.512	.450	W1
14 (Note: Atlanta finished with a better conference record than Tampa Bay.)	Atlanta Falcons	South	4	12	0	.250	1–5	3–9	.553	.313	L2
15	Tampa Bay Buccaneers	South	4	12	0	.250	1–5	2–10	.574	.391	L3
16	Washington Redskins	East	3	13	0	.188	0–6	1–11	.516	.438	L8
Tiebreakers (Note: When breaking ties for three or more teams under the NFL's rules, they are first broken within divisions, then comparing only the highest-ranked remaining team from each division.)

== Statistics ==
=== Starters ===
==== Regular season ====
Offense

Pos.	Name	GS
QB	Carson Palmer	16
RB	Rashard Mendenhall; Andre Ellington	15; 1
WR1	Larry Fitzgerald	16
WR2	Michael Floyd	16
TE	Jim Dray	16
TE	Rob Housler; Kory Sperry	13; 3
LT	Levi Brown; Bradley Sowell	4; 12
LG	Daryn Colledge	16
C	Lyle Sendlein	16
RG	Paul Fanaika	16
RT	Eric Winston	16

Defense

Pos.	Name	GS
DE	Calais Campbell	16
NT	Dan Williams; Alameda Ta'amu	14; 2
DE	Darnell Dockett	16
OLB	Lorenzo Alexander; Matt Shaughnessy	3; 13
LB	Daryl Washington; Jasper Brinkley	12; 4
LB	Karlos Dansby	16
OLB	John Abraham	16
CB	Patrick Peterson	16
SS	Yeremiah Bell	16
FS	Rashad Johnson; Tyrann Mathieu; Tony Jefferson	3; 12; 1
CB	Jerraud Powers	16
NB	Rashad Johnson; Tony Jefferson	11; 5

Special Teams

Pos.	Name	GS
P	Dave Zastudil	16
K	Jay Feely	16
LS	Mike Leach	16

=== Individual leaders ===
Category	Player(s)	Value
Passing yards	Carson Palmer	4,274
Passing touchdowns	Carson Palmer	24
Rushing yards	Rashard Mendenhall	687
Rushing touchdowns	Rashard Mendenhall	8
Receptions	Larry Fitzgerald	82
Receiving touchdowns	Larry Fitzgerald	10
Receiving yards	Michael Floyd	954
Kickoff return yards	Javier Arenas	493
Punt return yards	Patrick Peterson	198
Tackles	Karlos Dansby	122
Sacks	John Abraham	11.5
Forced fumbles	John Abraham	4
Interceptions	Karlos Dansby	4

=== Team rankings ===
Category	Value	NFL rank (out of 32)
Passing attempts	574	
Passing completions	363	17th
Passing yards	4,002	13th
Passing touchdowns	24	15th
Interceptions thrown	22	28th
Rushing attempts	422	20th
Rushing yards	1,540	23rd
Rushing touchdowns	12	18th
Rushing yards/attempt	3.6	27th
Total yards of offense	5,542	12th
Points scored	379	16th
Points allowed	324	7th
Passing yards allowed	3,728	14th
Passing touchdowns allowed	29	21st
Rushing attempts against	370	2nd
Rushing yards allowed	1,351	1st
Rushing touchdowns allowed	5	3rd
Yards/rush attempt allowed	3.7	2nd
Interceptions made	20	5th
Fumbles recovered	10	15th
Total yards allowed	5,079	6th

Statistics correct as of the end of the 2013 NFL season
