= Jake Ballard =

American football player (born 1987)

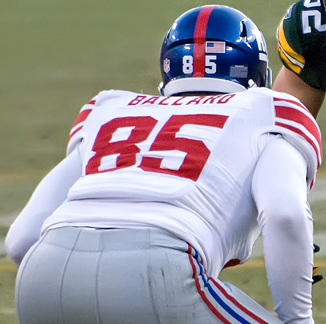
- Ballard with the New York Giants in 2012

No. 81, 85, 86
- Position: Tight end

Personal information
- Born: December 2, 1987 (age 38); Springboro, Ohio, U.S.
- Listed height: 6 ft 7 in (2.01 m)
- Listed weight: 275 lb (125 kg)

Career information
- High school: Springboro (OH)
- College: Ohio State
- NFL draft: 2010: undrafted

Career history
- New York Giants (2010–2011); New England Patriots (2012); Arizona Cardinals (2013)

Awards and highlights
- Super Bowl champion (XLVI)

Career NFL statistics
- Receptions: 45
- Receiving yards: 679
- Receiving touchdowns: 6
- Stats at Pro Football Reference

Jacob Owen Ballard (born December 2, 1987) is an American former professional football player who was a tight end in the National Football League (NFL). He played college football at Ohio State and was signed by the New York Giants as an undrafted free agent in 2010 and won Super Bowl XLVI with them. He was also a member of the New England Patriots and Arizona Cardinals.

== Early life and college ==
Ballard grew up in Springboro, Ohio. He went to Springboro High School and started on both sides of the ball in football and started on the basketball team. He attended Ohio State University, where he caught 34 passes for 377 yards, averaging 11.1 yards per catch, and 3 touchdowns.

== Professional career ==
=== New York Giants ===
Ballard was signed by the New York Giants as an undrafted free agent following the 2010 NFL draft on April 25, 2010. He was waived/injured after suffering a hamstring injury during training camp on August 19. He was re-signed to the team's practice squad on September 5. He was promoted to the active roster on November 20. He played in the game against the Philadelphia Eagles the following day, playing eights snaps. He was waived on November 23, and re-signed to the practice squad the following day. He was promoted to the active roster again on December 16.

Ballard played in the November 6, 2011 game against the New England Patriots (5–2) at Gillette Stadium in Foxborough, Massachusetts, finishing the day with 67 receiving yards, including a 28-yard catch on 3rd and 10 with :51 left and the subsequent 1-yard touchdown catch with just 17 seconds to play. The Giants won the game 24-20 to maintain a 2-game lead in the NFC East and hand the Patriots their second straight loss for the first time since 2009 (and first in 21 consecutive games at home).

Ballard played in Super Bowl XLVI but left in the second half with a torn ACL in his left knee. After leaving the field, he attempted to run and cut on the sideline, but collapsed unable to reach full speed. Replacing Ballard was teammate Bear Pascoe, who finished the game with 4 catches for 33 receiving yards. The Giants defeated the Patriots in the Super Bowl 21–17.

=== New England Patriots ===
While Ballard was recovering from his ACL injury, the Giants decided to place him on injured reserve. Because they decided to do so during the offseason, NFL rules required that he be exposed to waiver claims before they could do so. While Ballard and his agent expected that he would clear waivers, New England claimed him off waivers on June 12, 2012. He spent the entire 2012 regular season on the Physically Unable to Perform list. On August 30, 2013 Ballard was informed of his release.

=== Arizona Cardinals ===
After cutting rookie tight end D. C. Jefferson due to his arrest, the Cardinals agreed to terms with Ballard on November 4, 2013. Ballard was expected to split time with tight ends Jim Dray and Rob Housler. On December 15, 2013, Ballard caught his first touchdown pass in two years in a win against the Tennessee Titans. He played in eight games and caught seven passes for 75 yards and two touchdowns.

On August 6, 2014, Ballard announced his retirement from the NFL because "after sustaining a serious knee injury while playing for the New York Giants in the Super Bowl, my body never felt the same. Having a quality of life after football is very important to me and I have witnessed it taken away from others."

== Life after football ==
Ballard is a real estate agent with Howard Hanna Real Estate Services in Upper Arlington, Ohio.

As of 2025, Ballard is married.
