= Sam Acho =

American football player (born 1988)

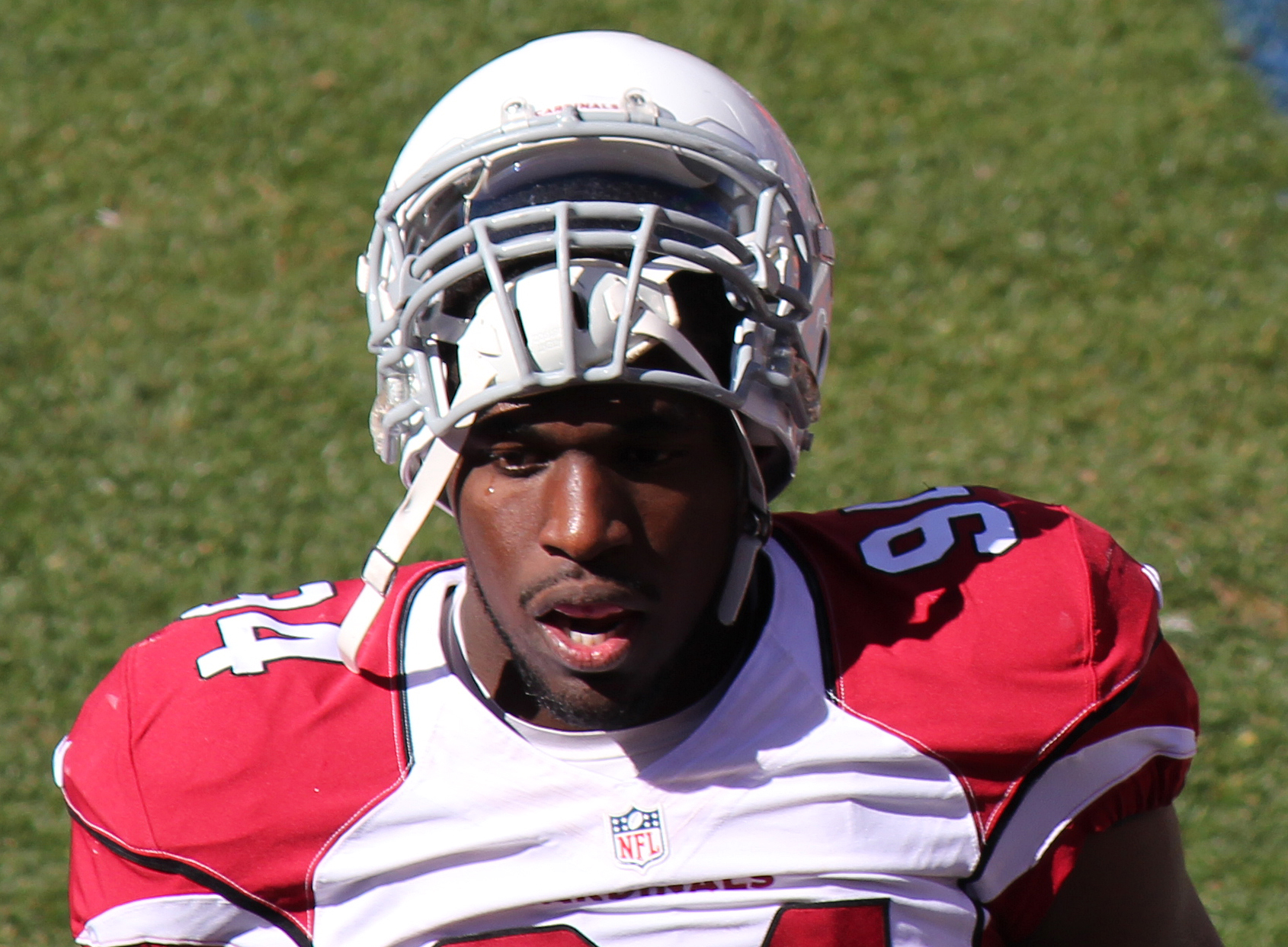
- Acho with the Arizona Cardinals in 2014

No. 94, 49, 93, 96
- Position: Linebacker

Personal information
- Born: September 6, 1988 (age 38); Dallas, Texas, U.S.
- Listed height: 6 ft 2 in (1.88 m)
- Listed weight: 259 lb (117 kg)

Career information
- High school: St. Mark's (Dallas, Texas)
- College: Texas (2007–2010)
- NFL draft: 2011: 4th round, 103rd overall pick

Career history
- Arizona Cardinals (2011–2014); Chicago Bears (2015–2018); Buffalo Bills (2019)*; Tampa Bay Buccaneers (2019)
- * Offseason or practice squad member only

Awards and highlights
- William V. Campbell Trophy (2010); Wuerffel Trophy (2010); First-team All-Big 12 (2010)

Career NFL statistics
- Total tackles: 241
- Sacks: 18.0
- Forced fumbles: 11
- Fumble recoveries: 3
- Interceptions: 3
- Stats at Pro Football Reference

Samuel Onyedikachi Acho (born September 6, 1988) is an American sports analyst and former professional football player. He played linebacker and special teams for nine seasons in the National Football League (NFL) for the Arizona Cardinals, Chicago Bears and Tampa Bay Buccaneers after being drafted in the 4th Round, 103rd overall in 2011. He played college football for the Texas Longhorns.

In college he won multiple awards related to leadership and scholarship. In the NFL he was vice president of the NFL Players Association. He is now a football analyst on ESPN.

== Early life ==
Born in Dallas, Texas, Sam Acho built a distinguished multi-sport and academic legacy at the St. Mark's School of Texas. Throughout his four years of high school, Acho consistently maintained a position on the academic honor roll, even while competing at an elite athletic level. As a standout football player, he secured all-Southwest Preparatory Conference (All-State equivalent) honors for three consecutive years and served as team co-captain during his junior and senior seasons. His athletic versatility extended to basketball, where he averaged 12 points and 15 rebounds per game as a senior, and to track and field, where he captured state private school championships in both shot put and discus. As of 2018, he still holds the school's 12-pound shot put record at 57'9.25", closely followed by his brother Emmanuel, who conversely holds the school's discus record ahead of Sam. Despite attending a small all-boys institution primarily celebrated for its academic excellence, Acho excelled on the national stage, graduating as the country's sixth-ranked weak-side defensive end prospect.

== College career ==
Acho played defensive end for the Texas Longhorns from 2006 to 2010.

As a freshman at the University of Texas, Acho played in 10 games, recording six tackles and a sack. That Longhorns team finished the season by beating Arizona State in the 2007 Holiday Bowl.

As a sophomore in 2008, he played in all 13 games and recorded 15 tackles and three sacks. The Longhorns spent much of that season ranked #1 and won a share of the Big 12 South Championship before beating Ohio State in the 2009 Fiesta Bowl.

As a junior in 2009, Acho started all 14 games and was named honorable mention All-Big 12 by The Associated Press and team MVP after recording 55 tackles and a team high 10 sacks and 4 fumble recoveries. The Longhorns posted a perfect 13–0 regular season, captured the Big 12 South and conference championship titles, and advanced to the 2010 BCS National Championship Game. He was named an All-Big 12 Honorable Mention.

In 2010, as a senior, he was team captain on a team that went a disappointing 5-7 after starting the season ranked #5. He led the team in tackles for loss (17), sacks (9), fumble recoveries (5). His 5 fumble recoveries set a school record, tied the Big 12 record and was the 2nd most in the nation that year. After the season, he was voted team MVP, a unanimous First Team All Big-12 selection, a Walter Camp Second-Team All-American, an Associated Press Third-Team All-American, the College Football Performance Awards (CFPA) Defensive Lineman of the Year, a Lombardi Trophy semi-finalist, winner of a NCAA Top 10 Award and winner of the 2010 William V. Campbell Trophy. He was also the school's first Wuerffel Trophy winner.

He finished his career tied with Dat Nguyenfor #2 in the Big 12 for career fumble recoveries (9), and in the top 10 at Texas for career sacks, forced fumbles and fumble recoveries. In 2022 he was named to the school's Hall of Honor. He graduated with a double major in business honors and marketing.

When his career at Texas was over he played in the 2010 Senior Bowl.

== Professional career ==
=== Pre-draft ===
Acho attended the NFL Scouting Combine in Indianapolis and performed all of the combine and positional drills. On March 29, 2011, he participated at Texas' pro day, but chose to stand on his combine numbers and only performed positional drills. At the conclusion of the pre-draft process, Acho was projected to be a second or third-round pick by the majority of NFL draft experts and scouts. He was ranked as the seventh best outside linebacker in the draft by DraftScout.com.

External videos
- 2011 NFL Draft Profile: Sam Acho
- Sam Acho's NFL Combine Workout

Pre-draft measurables
Height	Weight	Arm length	Hand span	Wingspan	40-yard dash	10-yard split	20-yard split	20-yard shuttle	Three-cone drill	Vertical jump	Broad jump	Bench press
6 ft 1 5/8 in (1.87 m)	262 lb (119 kg)	33 1/2 in (0.85 m)	9 3/4 in (0.25 m)	6 ft 8 in (2.03 m)	4.68 s	1.69 s	2.77 s	4.32 s	6.69 s	33.5 in (0.85 m)	9 ft 4 in (2.84 m)	23 reps
All values from NFL Combine

=== Arizona Cardinals ===
==== 2011 ====
The Arizona Cardinals selected Acho in the fourth round (103rd overall) of the 2011 NFL draft. He was the 12th defensive end drafted in 2011. On July 29th the Cardinals signed him to a four-year, $2.51 million contract that included a signing bonus of $474,428.

Throughout training camp, he competed to be a starting outside linebacker against Clark Haggans and O'Brien Schofield. Head coach Ken Whisenhunt named Acho a backup outside linebacker to begin the regular season, behind Joey Porter, Clark Haggans, and O'Brien Schofield.

He made his professional regular season debut in the Arizona Cardinals' season-opener against the Carolina Panthers and made his first career regular season tackle in their 28–21 victory. On October 23, 2011, Acho recorded two solo tackles and made his first career sack when he sacked Pittsburgh Steelers' quarterback Ben Roethlisberger for a five-yard loss in the fourth quarter during a 32–20 loss. On October 30, 2011, he earned his first career start and recorded five combined tackles, a sack, and forced the first fumble, while sacking quarterback Joe Flacco for a ten-yard loss in the third quarter, of his career during a 30–27 loss at the Baltimore Ravens. He remained the starting outside linebacker for the last ten games of the season after Joey Porter was placed on injured reserve due to a knee injury. In Week 10, he collected a season-high six solo tackles during a 21–17 win at the Philadelphia Eagles.

He finished his rookie season in 2011 with 40 combined tackles (35 solo), seven sacks, two pass deflections, and four forced fumbles (5th most on the NFL that year) in 16 games and ten starts. Acho's seven sacks were the second most ever by a Cardinals rookie, trailing Simeon Rice's 12.5 in 1996.

==== 2012 ====
During training camp, Acho competed to retain his role as a starting outside linebacker against O'Brien Schofield and Clark Haggans. Head coach Ken Whisenhunt named Acho and Schofield the starting outside linebackers to begin the regular season, along with inside linebackers Daryl Washington and Paris Lenon.

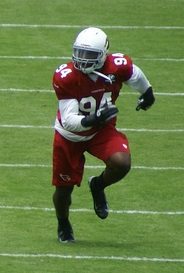
Acho during the 2012 NFL season.

On October 21, 2012 Acho recorded four combined tackles, deflected a pass, and made his first career interception off a pass by Vikings' quarterback Christian Ponder, that was originally intended for running back Adrian Peterson, in the second quarter during a 21–14 loss at the Minnesota Vikings. In Week 14, he collected a season-high seven combined tackles in the Cardinals' 58–0 loss at the Seattle Seahawks.

He started in all 16 games in 2012 and recorded a career-high 48 combined tackles (35 solo), four sacks, three pass deflections, and two interceptions.

==== 2013 ====
On January 8, 2013, the Arizona Cardinals fired head coach Ken Whisenhunt after they finished with a 5–11 record. Defensive coordinator Todd Bowles held a competition for the jobs as the starting outside linebackers between Acho, O'Brien Schofield, Lorenzo Alexander, and Alex Okafor. Head coach Bruce Arians named Acho and Alexander the starting outside linebackers to start the regular season, along with inside linebackers Karlos Dansby and Jasper Brinkley.

He started in the Arizona Cardinals' season-opener at the St. Louis Rams and collected a season-high two solo tackles and forced a fumble in their 27–25 loss. In Week 3, Acho made two solo tackles and a sack before exiting the Cardinals' 31–7 loss at the New Orleans Saints in the third quarter due to an ankle injury. On September 23, 2013, the Arizona Cardinals placed Acho on injured reserve after he was diagnosed with a broken left fibula and scheduled to miss the remainder of the season.

He finished the season with five solo tackles, a sack, and a forced fumble in three games and ten starts.

==== 2014 ====
Acho entered training camp slated as a starting outside linebacker and saw competition from Lorenzo Alexander, John Abraham, and Matt Shaughnessy. Head coach Bruce Arians named Acho a backup outside linebacker to begin the regular season, behind Abraham and Shaughnessy.

Abraham was injured in week 1 and Shaughnessy in week 5, which allowed Acho to start 4 games that year. On September 14, 2014, Acho recorded a solo tackle, broke up a pass, and intercepted a pass by Giants' quarterback Eli Manning during a 25–14 win at the New York Giants in Week 2. In Week 12, he collected a season-high four combined tackles in the Cardinals' 10–3 loss to the Seattle Seahawks. The following week, he tied his season-high of four combined tackles during a 29–18 loss at the Atlanta Falcons.

He finished the 2014 season with 31 combined tackles (23 solo), three pass deflections, an interception, and a sack in 16 games and four starts.

The Arizona Cardinals finished second in the NFC West with an 11–5 record and earned a wildcard berth. On January 3, 2015, Acho started in the NFC Wildcard Game and recorded seven combined tackles and forced a fumble during a 27–16 loss at the Carolina Panthers. Afterwards Acho became a free agent.

=== Chicago Bears ===
==== 2015 ====
On April 1, 2015, the Chicago Bears signed Acho to a one-year, $840,000 contract.

During training camp, Acho competed to be a starting outside linebacker against Jared Allen, Lamarr Houston, David Bass, and Willie Young; but was sidelined for three weeks during the preseason by mononucleosis.

On September 12, the Bears terminated Acho's contract after he was ruled inactive due to his illness. But two days later they re-signed Acho to a one-year, $840,000 contract. In Week 5, he collected a season-high six solo tackles during an 18–17 win at the Kansas City Chiefs. That season he shared starts with Willie Young and finished with 39 combined tackles (30 solo), a pass deflection, a forced fumble, and one fumble recovery in 15 games and seven starts.

==== 2016 ====
On March 28, 2016, the Bears signed Acho to a one-year, $840,000 contract that included a signing bonus of $80,000. During training camp, Acho competed to be a starting outside linebacker against Pernell McPhee, Lamarr Houston, Willie Young, and rookie Leonard Floyd. Head coach John Fox named Acho the backup outside linebacker to begin the regular season, behind Willie Young and Leonard Floyd.

On September 18, 2016, Acho recorded three combined tackles and sacked quarterback Carson Wentz during a 29–14 loss to the Philadelphia Eagles in Week 2. The sack became his first since 2014. The following week, he collected season-high four combined tackles in the Bears' 31–17 loss at the Dallas Cowboys in Week 3. Acho finished the 2016 season with 27 combined tackles (18 solo), a pass deflection, a sack, and a forced fumble in 16 games and six starts.

==== 2017 ====
On April 15, 2017, the Chicago re-signed Acho to a one-year, $855,000 contract that included $130,000 guaranteed and a signing bonus of $80,000.

During training camp, Acho competed for a roster spot as a starting outside linebacker against Pernell McPhee, Willie Young, Leonard Floyd, Dan Skuta, and Lamarr Houston.

Acho became a starting outside linebacker for the last nine games of the regular season after Willie Young and Leonard Floyd both suffered injuries and were placed on injured reserve. On December 10, 2017, he collected a season-high five combined tackles during a 33–7 loss at the Cincinnati Bengals.

He finished the 2017 season with 45 combined tackles (29 solo), three sacks, a pass deflection and a forced fumble in 16 games and 12 starts. He also had a 3 yard kickoff return on a squib kick, the only one of his career. Pro Football Focus gave Acho an overall grade of 59.8, which ranked 88th among all edge rushers.

==== 2018 ====
On January 1, 2018, the Bears fired head coach John Fox after they finished the 2017 season with a 5–11 record. Head coach Matt Nagy opted to retain Vic Fangio as the Bears' defensive coordinator. On March 14, the Bears re-signed Acho to a two-year, $5.50 million contract with $2.95 million guaranteed and signing bonus $500,000. On October 8, 2018, Acho was placed on season-ending injured reserve after suffering a torn pectoral muscle. He finished the season having played in only 4 games and recording just 1 tackle.

On March 5, 2019, the Bears released Acho, ending his 51-game, 25-start tenure with 140 total tackles (17 on special teams), four sacks, three forced fumbles, and a fumble recovery.

=== Buffalo Bills ===
On August 11, 2019, Acho was signed by the Buffalo Bills. He was released by the Bills on August 31.

=== Tampa Bay Buccaneers ===
On November 5, 2019, Acho signed a one-year contract with the Tampa Bay Buccaneers, reuniting him with former coach Bruce Arians. He played in 8 games for the Buccaneers recording a forced fumble, a sack, 3 tackles and a QBH while playing primarily on special teams.

=== Off the field activities ===
- NFL Players Association representative for the Chicago Bears (2018)
- Vice President, Executive Committee, NFL Player's Association (2018-2022)

== NFL career statistics ==
Legend
**Bold**	Career high

=== Regular season ===
Year	Team	Games		Tackles					Interceptions					Fumbles			
Year	Team	GP	GS	Cmb	Solo	Ast	Sck	TfL	Int	Yds	TD	Lng	PD	FF	FR	Yds	TD
2011	ARI	**16**	10	42	**36**	6	**7.0**	5	0	0	0	0	2	**3**	**1**	**1**	0
2012	ARI	**16**	**16**	**48**	35	13	4.0	**6**	**2**	2	0	2	**3**	2	0	0	0
2013	ARI	3	2	5	4	1	1.0	1	0	0	0	0	0	1	**1**	0	0
2014	ARI	**16**	4	31	23	8	1.0	4	1	**3**	0	**3**	**3**	1	0	0	0
2015	CHI	15	7	39	30	9	0.0	1	0	0	0	0	1	1	**1**	0	0
2016	CHI	**16**	6	27	18	9	1.0	3	0	0	0	0	1	1	0	0	0
2017	CHI	**16**	12	45	29	**16**	3.0	2	0	0	0	0	1	1	0	0	0
2018	CHI	4	0	1	1	0	0.0	0	0	0	0	0	0	0	0	0	0
2019	TB	8	0	3	2	1	1.0	0	0	0	0	0	0	0	0	0	0
Career		110	57	241	178	63	18.0	22	3	5	0	3	11	11	3	1	0

=== Playoffs ===
Year	Team	Games		Tackles					Interceptions					Fumbles			
Year	Team	GP	GS	Cmb	Solo	Ast	Sck	TfL	Int	Yds	TD	Lng	PD	FF	FR	Yds	TD
2014	ARI	**1**	**1**	**7**	**2**	**5**	**1.0**	0	0	0	0	0	0	**1**	0	0	0
Career		1	1	7	2	5	1.0	0	0	0	0	0	0	1	0	0	0

== Academic, leadership and service awards ==
In college, Acho won numerous awards for academics, leadership and Service. He won the William V. Campbell Trophy, given annually to college football's top scholar-athlete, as well as the Wuerffel Trophy, college football's premier award for outstanding community service, He was one of eight winners of the NCAA Today's Top VIII Award, which recognizes the premier student-athletes in all sports during an academic year and a member of the 2010 American Football Coaches Association (AFCA) Good Works Team. He was the 2010-11 Male Big 12 Sportsperson of the Year, recognizing his community service and he was a finalist for the Lott Trophy, which is an award focused on character. In his junior year he was a semifinalist for the Lott Trophy and a finalist for the Wuerffel Trophy. He was an NFF scholar-athlete and won the 2010 ARA sportsmanship award.

In addition to being a two-time Academic All-American, he was a three-time first-team Academic All-Big 12 selection and was Academic All-District three times in high school.

During his senior year, the Sporting News named Acho one of the 20 smartest athletes in sports, a list that included two other college players and 17 professionals from the four major American sports.

Acho was twice named Arthur Ashe Jr. Sports Scholar by Diverse: Issues In Higher Education.

During his NFL rookie year, Bleacher Report rated Acho one of the 10 smartest players in the NFL.

During his time with the Bears, he was the team's nominee for the Walter Payton Man of the Year Award in 2016 and 2017.

Acho is included in a 2016 AOL article, "Six NFL Players with Genius IQ's," which noted that he is fluent in 3 languages: English, Spanish, and Igbo.

In 2026 he was inducted into CSC Academic All-America Hall of Fame.

== Media career ==
After retiring from professional football, Acho transitioned into a media career, leveraging his athletic background and academic achievements to become a prominent sports analyst and commentator.

In 2021, Acho joined ESPN as a college football analyst, contributing to the network's comprehensive coverage of the sport. He serves as a lead studio voice on college football Saturdays on ESPN2 and has called select college football and UFL matchups.

Prior to his role at ESPN, Acho co-hosted “Relevant Is Doing a Sports Podcast,” a show focusing on the intersection of faith, pop culture, and sports.

== Personal life ==
Acho is a Christian. Acho married his wife, Ngozi, in 2014. They have 4 children.

Acho's younger brother, Emmanuel Acho, also played football for Texas, where he was an All Big 12 linebacker in 2011. His brother played four seasons in the NFL with the Cleveland Browns, Philadelphia Eagles, and New York Giants before becoming an analyst for ESPN.

In 2015, while playing in the NFL, Sam Acho earned an MBA from the Thunderbird School of Global Management in Glendale, Arizona. He has worked as Director of Human Capital at AWM Capital since 2022. He is also founder and president of Athletes for Justice.

Acho and his family return annually to Nigeria in order to participate in their annual Living Hope Christian Ministries' medical mission "Operation Hope" and he's an ambassador for the International Justice Mission.

He is the author of Let the World See You: How to Be Real in a World Full of Fakes, which was published in late 2020 and Change Starts With You: Following Your Fire to Heal a Broken World which was released in 2023.

== See also ==
- Notable alumni of St. Mark's School of Texas
