= Cole Madison =

American football player (born 1994)

No. 61
- Position: Guard

Personal information
- Born: December 20, 1994 (age 31); Burien, Washington, U.S.
- Listed height: 6 ft 5 in (1.96 m)
- Listed weight: 308 lb (140 kg)

Career information
- High school: John F. Kennedy Catholic (Burien, Washington)
- College: Washington State (2013-2017)
- NFL draft: 2018: 5th round, 138th overall pick

Career history
- Green Bay Packers (2018–2019)

Awards and highlights
- Second-team All-Pac-12 (2017)
- Stats at Pro Football Reference

Cole Madison (born December 20, 1994) is an American former professional football guard. He played college football at Washington State, and was selected by the Green Bay Packers in the fifth round of the 2018 NFL draft.

== College career ==
Madison attended and played college football at Washington State under head coach Mike Leach from 2013 to 2017. After redshirting in 2013, he was a major contributor for the following four seasons. In 2014, he made his collegiate debut and first start in the season opener against Rutgers. In 2015, he started all 13 games at right tackle and garnered All-Pac-12 Conference honorable mention accolades. In 2016, he started all 13 games at right tackle. He was named as an All-Pac-12 Conference honorable mention and to the All-America Second-team and All-Pac-12 First-team by Pro Football Focus. In 2017, he started all 13 games at right tackle and was named All-Pac-12 Conference Second-team and All-Pac-12 First-team by the Associated Press.

== Professional career ==
=== 2018 season ===
Madison was selected by the Green Bay Packers in the fifth round of the 2018 NFL draft (138th overall). He signed his rookie contract on May 7, 2018. On August 13, 2018, the Packers reported that Madison was dealing with a personal issue. Madison did not participate in any games during the 2018 NFL season.

=== 2019 season ===
On April 8, 2019, Madison was reinstated to the Packers active roster. Upon his return, Madison cited his mental health as the reason for this hiatus. The suicide of Madison's friend and teammate Tyler Hilinski in January 2018 is believed to be one of the reasons for his break from football.

Madison entered the 2019 season as a backup interior lineman. On November 23, 2019, he was placed on injured reserve after suffering a torn ACL in practice.

He was waived by the Packers on July 31, 2020, with a failed physical designation.
