= John F. Kennedy Catholic High School (Washington) =

Kennedy Catholic

Location
- 140 South 140th Street; Burien, Washington; Burien, (King County), Washington 98168; United States; 47°28′42″N 122°19′55″W

Information
- Type: Private, Day & Boarding, College-prep, Coeducational
- Religious affiliation: Roman Catholic
- Patron saint: St. Pier Giorgio Frassati
- Established: 1966
- Oversight: Archdiocese of Seattle
- President: Matthew Mohs
- Administrator: Katie Burns
- Head of school: Matthew Mohs
- Chaplain: Father Patrick Sherard
- Teaching staff: 70
- Grades: 9–12
- Average class size: 23
- Student to teacher ratio: 13:1
- Campus: Suburban
- Campus size: 17 acres
- Colors: Scarlet, white and navy blue
- Athletics: Yes
- Athletics conference: North Puget Sound League 4A
- Mascot: Lancer
- Newspaper: Profile
- Yearbook: Imago
- Website: kennedyhs.org

Kennedy Catholic High School previously known as John F. Kennedy Memorial High School is a private, day and boarding, college-prep, Catholic high school in Burien, Washington, located in the Roman Catholic Archdiocese of Seattle.

== Profile ==
Kennedy Catholic was established in 1966 and is one of three Archdiocesan high schools in the Roman Catholic Archdiocese of Seattle. Kennedy Catholic was originally known as John F. Kennedy Memorial High School, but changed its name with the beginning of the 2009/2010 academic year in order to reflect its Catholic roots.

== Ministries ==
- St. Vincent de Paul Giving Tree during Advent.
- Serve over 16,000+ service hours per year in an around the community.
- Participate in yearly faith retreats.
- Raise money or collect items for needs in the community.
- Raise scholarship money for Kennedy Catholic's sister school in Cuernavaca, Mexico.

== Athletics ==
Kennedy Catholic is part of the North Puget Sound 4A League within the WIAA's District 3 (West Central) and has won 17 State Titles and over 267 League Titles.

== Controversies ==
On February 13, 2020, two teachers were allegedly forced to resign after becoming engaged to same-sex partners, allegedly contradicting covenant agreements between the individuals and the school. While the religiously-affiliated school is exempt from Washington state workplace discrimination laws that prohibit discrimination based on sexual orientation, students and community members argued that firing LGBT teachers contradicts the teachings of the Catholic Church. In response, students, parents, alumni, and members of the larger Catholic community have protested in support of the two teachers.

== Notable alumni ==
- Floyd Bannister (1973) – Major League Baseball player
- Lizanne Falsetto (1981) – business entrepreneur, wellness expert, model, and public speaker
- Mike Utley (1984) – former National Football League player
- Jim Caviezel (1987) – film actor
- J. Michael Diaz (1988) – US Assistant Attorney
- Rebecca Saldana (1995) – Washington state senator
- Michelle French (1995) – Olympic silver medalist in soccer (U.S. Team, year 2000)
- Mateo Messina – film and television score composer
- Paul Arnold (1999) – former National Football League player
- Joey Thomas (1999) – former National Football League player
- Cris Lewis (2006) - former National Women's Soccer League player for Portland Thorns FC, assistant women's soccer coach at the University of Oregon
- Everette Thompson (2008) – former National Football League player, played for the Arizona Cardinals
- Cole Madison (2013) – former National Football League player, played for the Green Bay Packers
- Sam Huard (2021) – former five star quarterback at the University of Washington and Cal Poly
- Derek Colman-Brusa (2026) – college football defensive tackle for the Washington Huskies
