= Suitcase (magazine) =

British travel magazine

Suitcase Magazine
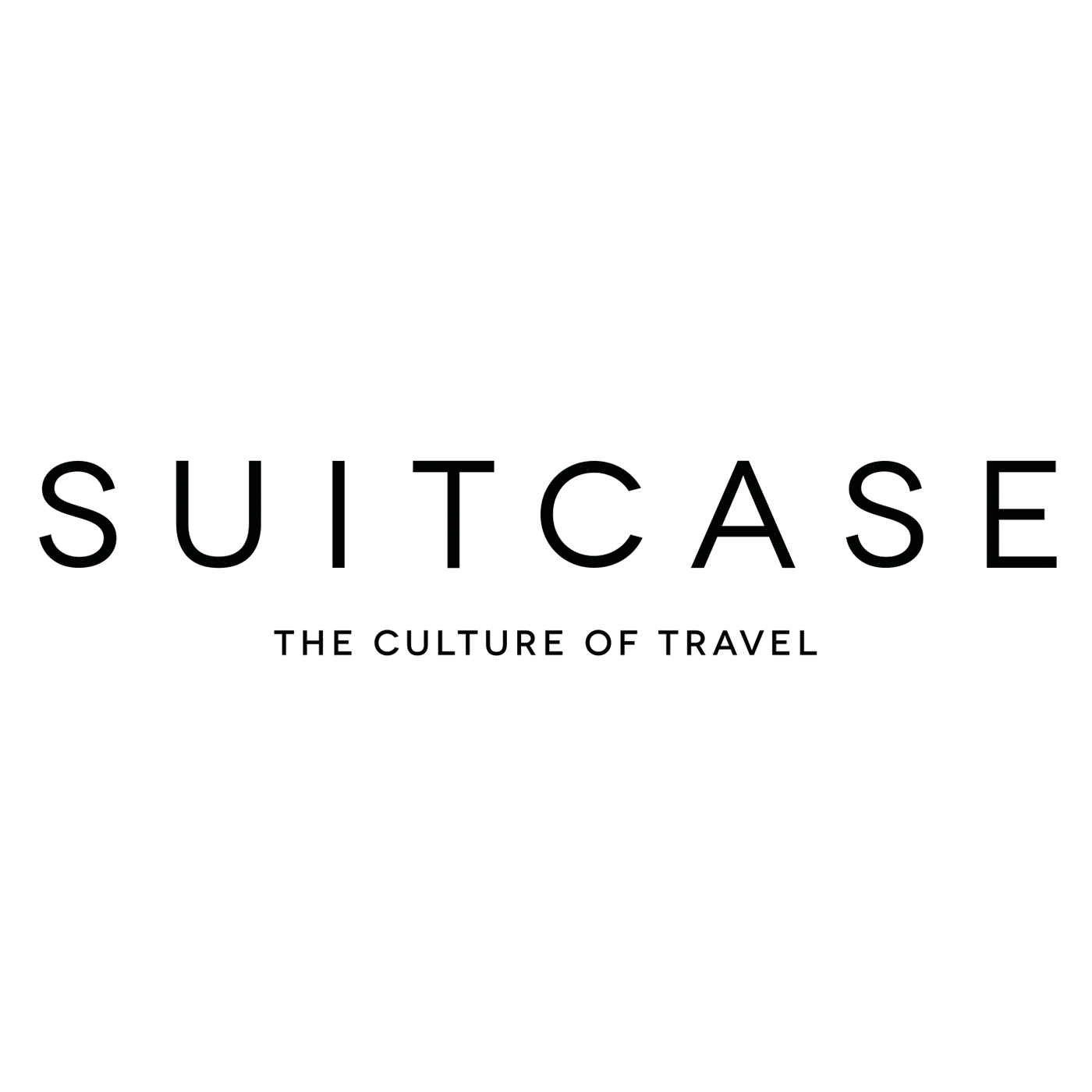
- Industry: Travel magazine
- Founded: 2012
- Founder: Serena Guen
- Headquarters: London, United Kingdom
- Website: suitcasemag.com

Suitcase Magazine is a multimedia travel magazine, first published in 2012 by Serena Guen. The magazine is available as a quarterly print magazine, iPad and iPhone app, and a daily updated travel website.

Each quarterly print volume includes global travel destinations by theme such as, rhythm, myths & legends, and art, and includes travel stories, city guides and fashion editorials.

In 2023, Suitcase removed their shop and went into liquidation following filing for insolvency.

== Founder and chief executive officer ==
Serena Guen founded Suitcase Magazine during her final year at New York University.

== Book ==
- Cook For Syria: Recipe Book. Suitcase, 2016. Curated by Clerkenwell Boy. Edited by Serena Guen. ISBN 978-1527203341.
- Bake for Syria. Suitcase, 2018. Curated by Clerkenwell Boy. Edited by Serena Guen. ISBN 978-1527221963.

== Awards ==
- Magazine of The Year and Travel Magazine of The Year, Digital Magazine Awards 2016
- Travel Writer of the Year, Association of Independent Tour Operators for staff writers and contributors Emily Ames, Guen, Maria Alafouzou and Hannah McKeand
- Nominated, best website, Awwwards
- Winner, Best Art Direction, Buenos Aires International Fashion Film Festival for The Getaway, a video starring Suki Waterhouse and Poppy Jamie
- Winner, Flight Centre's Best Travel Publication, Travel Blog Awards 2017.

== See also ==
- Monocle (UK magazine)
- Condé Nast Traveler
- Refinery29
- Travel + Leisure
