= Derek Colman-Brusa =

American football player (born 2008)

No. 5 – Washington Huskies
- Position: Defensive tackle
- Class: Freshman

Personal information
- Born: April 28, 2008 (age 18)
- Listed height: 6 ft 5 in (1.96 m)
- Listed weight: 295 lb (134 kg)

Career information
- High school: Kennedy Catholic (Burien, Washington)
- College: Washington (2026–present)
- Stats at ESPN

Derek Colman-Brusa (born April 28, 2008) is an American college football defensive tackle for the Washington Huskies.

== Early life ==
Colman-Brusa is from Seattle, Washington. His brother, Lowen, has been teammates with him in high school and college. He grew up competing in football and wrestling. After eighth grade, and before he had played in high school, he received a scholarship offer to play college football for the Washington Huskies.

Colman-Brusa attended John F. Kennedy Catholic High School in Burien, Washington, and was a top defensive end in football. As a sophomore, he posted 75 tackles and 14 sacks to earn Class 4A All-North Puget Sound League defensive lineman of the year, while as a junior, he was Class 4A All-NPSL player of the year while posting 68 tackles and 10 sacks. Colman-Brusa was named NPSL player of the year again in 2025 as a senior while totaling 50 tackles, 19 tackles-for-loss (TFLs) and eight sacks. He was ranked a four-star recruit and the top prospect in the state of Washington. Colman-Brusa committed to play college football for the Washington Huskies.

== College career ==
Colman-Brusa changed positions to defensive tackle after joining Washington and impressed early during the 2026 season, winning a starting role.
