= Nicole Kersh =

Australian entrepreneur (born 1984)

- Born: May 1984; South Africa
- Education: University of New South Wales
- Occupation: entrepreneur
- Website: www.nicolekersh.com.au

Nicole Kersh is an Australian entrepreneur. She is the founder and former managing director of 4cabling, an Australian-based cabling and IT accessories manufacturer.

== Career ==
Kersh is the founder of business 4cabling, a direct-to-consumer manufacturer, wholesaler and retailer of cabling and IT management accessories in Australia. She started the business in 2006 in her parents’ garage. Kersh, who at the time was a 21-year-old university student, founded her company following her experiences with her parents’ electrical cabling company. To create the site, she taught herself HTML and tracked her business while attending university lectures. Kersh owns 51 per cent of 4cabling and her mother the remaining 49 per cent.

In May 2014, Kersh sold the business to private equity firm Gernis Holdings.

Kersh is also the founder of marketing agency The Content Folk, and works as an eCommerce specialist based in Sydney.

== Personal life ==
Kersh was born in South Africa. Kersh received a degree in Media and Communications from the University of New South Wales and resides in Sydney, Australia.

== See also ==
- Female entrepreneur
