= Amanda Wixted =

American video game programmer

- Born: November 23, 1981 (age 43); Paris, France
- Education: University of Arizona (2002-2005)
- Occupation: Video game programmer

Amanda Wixted (born November 23, 1981) is an American video game programmer and founder of Meteor Grove Software.

== Early life ==
Wixted was born on November 23, 1981, in Paris, France. At the age of two, she moved to Kuwait City, and at the age of nine, to Dhahran, Saudi Arabia, and at age 15 moved again to attend Stevenson School, a boarding school in Pebble Beach, California. She graduated from Stevenson School in 2000 and attended the University of Arizona where she received a bachelor's degree in computer science.

== Career ==
After graduating from the University of Arizona in 2005, Wixted took a job as a game programmer for SkillJam. There, she led a development team that created 10 mobile multiplayer games. Wixted also worked on a two-player turn-based strategy game while at SkillJam.

In May 2007, Wixted left SkillJam and began working at Namco Networks America At Namco, Wixted ported games such as Pac-Man,Galaga, and Dig Dug to the iPhone and J2ME mobile devices . Wixted was only at Namco for a year and a half.

Wixted was hired as a network operator and server-side gameplay developer at Zynga. In 2009, the company launched a Facebook game called PetVille. Wixted developed the server-side gameplay features for PetVille. Previous to the release of PetVille, she was promoted to the tech lead for the iPhone team at Zynga.

As tech lead, Wixted widely expanded the company's social gaming network on the iPhone. She led development teams on game applications such as LivePoker, Mafia Wars, Street Racing, Vampire Wars and FarmVille.

In 2011, Wixted co-founded Hyperspace, Inc. in the Greater New York City area. There, she worked on Turf Geography Club, a mobile location-based game.

Wixted then started Meteor Grove Software in Austin, Texas in 2011 and consults on and developing iOS software.

Wixted is currently CTO of Homer, an educational startup that helps kids learn to read.

== Personal life ==
In 2014, Wixted married Timothy Fitz. The two currently live in Austin, Texas with their child Ruby Polaris who was born on March 27, 2015.
