= Matt Shaughnessy =

American football player (born 1986)

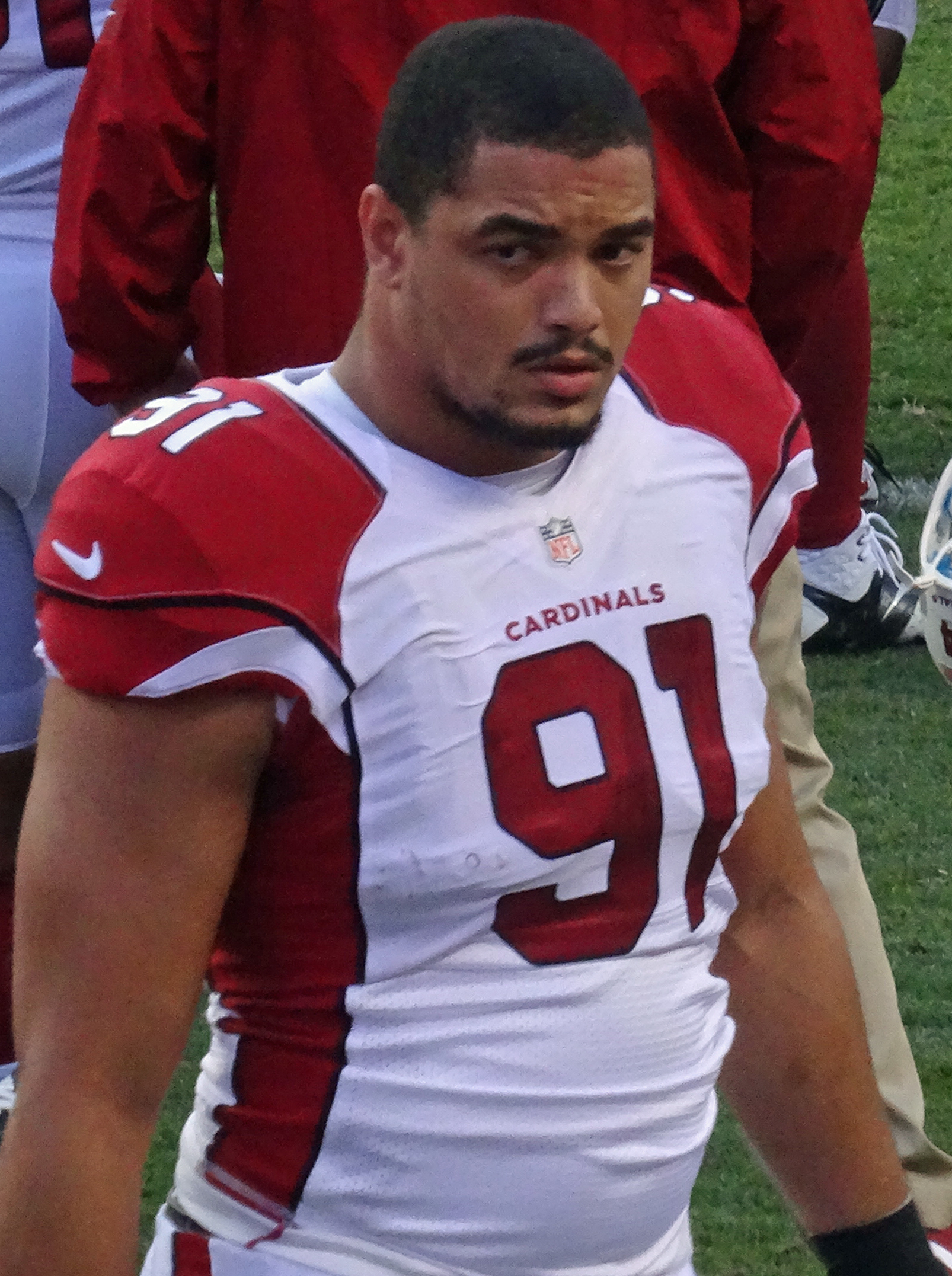
- Shaughnessy with the Arizona Cardinals in 2013

No. 77, 91
- Position: Defensive end

Personal information
- Born: September 23, 1986 (age 40); Norwich, Connecticut, U.S.
- Listed height: 6 ft 5 in (1.96 m)
- Listed weight: 285 lb (129 kg)

Career information
- High school: Norwich Free Academy (CT)
- College: Wisconsin
- NFL draft: 2009: 3rd round, 71st overall pick

Career history
- Oakland Raiders (2009–2012); Arizona Cardinals (2013–2014); New Orleans Saints (2016)

Awards and highlights
- PFWA All-Rookie Team (2009); Second-team All-Big Ten (2006)

Career NFL statistics
- Total tackles: 176
- Sacks: 18.5
- Forced fumbles: 3
- Fumble recoveries: 4
- Defensive touchdowns: 1
- Stats at Pro Football Reference

Matthew K. Shaughnessy (born September 23, 1986) is an American former professional football player who was a defensive end in the National Football League (NFL). He was selected by the Oakland Raiders in the third round of the 2009 NFL draft. He played college football for the Wisconsin Badgers.

== Early life ==
Shaughnessy attended the Norwich Free Academy in Norwich, Connecticut and graduated in 2005. He earned Super Prep All-American honors and was rated one of the top 30 defensive ends in the nation, according to Rivals.com. He was named to the Connecticut High School Coaches Association and New Haven Register All-State teams in 2004. Also, he earned All-Conference and All-Area accolades in each of his three final seasons, adding three more letters in basketball and two in track. He also played in the Connecticut vs Rhode Island All-Star Football Game as a Defensive End, earning the CT Defensive Player of the Game.

== College career ==
Shaughnessy played in 50 games and started 46 games at Wisconsin, recording 174 tackles (109 solos) with 18.5 sacks, 41.5 stops for losses and 22 quarterback pressures. He also caused and recovered one fumble while also deflecting nine passes. As a senior in 2008 he was honorable mention All-Big Ten Conference after recorded 40 tackles (29 solo) with four sacks and eight stops for losses and 10 quarterback pressures and deflected four passes. In 2007, he was a Second-team All-Big Ten Conference and the team's Defensive Most Valuable Player. he started all 13 games at right defensive end and made 18.0 stops for losses and a career-high 60 tackles (41 solos) with five sacks, three pass deflections and four pressures. The year before, in 2005, he was First-team Freshman All-American honors from The Sporting News and ESPN.com and an honorable mention All-Big Ten Conference after appearing in 11 games, starting seven, at right defensive end and finishing with 39 tackles (20 solos), 2.5 sacks, five pressures, 7.5 stops for losses and a pair of pass deflections.

== Professional career ==
Pre-draft measurables
Height	Weight	40-yard dash	10-yard split	20-yard split	20-yard shuttle	Three-cone drill	Vertical jump	Broad jump	Bench press
6 ft 5 in (1.96 m)	266 lb (121 kg)	4.95 s	1.77 s	2.93 s	4.88 s	7.68 s	30 1/2 in (0.77 m)	9 ft 4 in (2.84 m)	24 reps
All values from NFL Combine.

=== Oakland Raiders ===
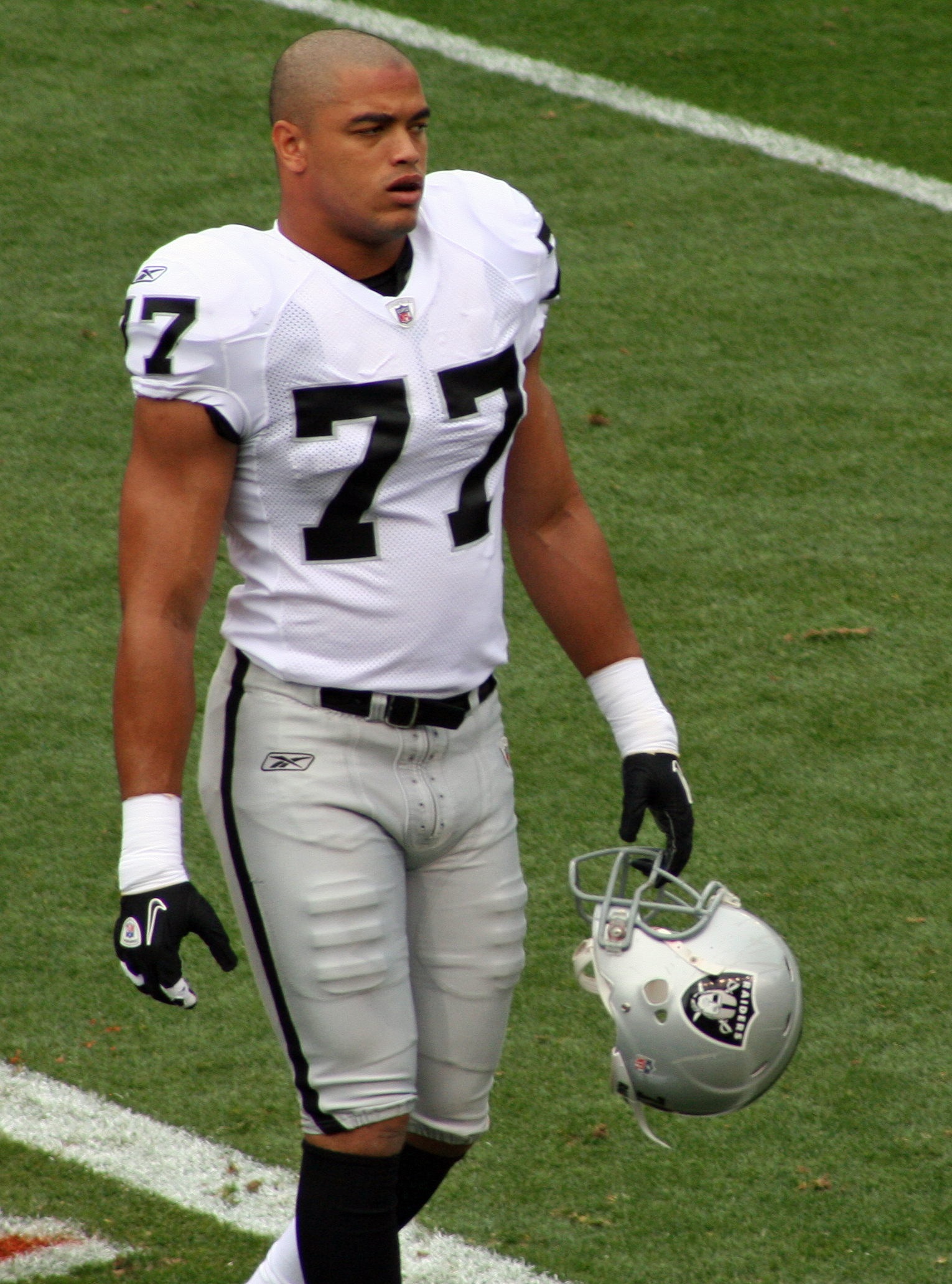
Shaughnessy with the Raiders in 2010

Shaughnessy was selected by the Raiders in the third round of the 2009 NFL draft with the 71st overall pick. He signed a 4-year contract on July 20, 2009.

As a rookie in 2009, Shaughnessy played in all 16 regular season games for the Raiders, starting two. He recorded 4 sacks and 29 tackles (26 of them solo). In 2010, he played in all 16 games, starting in eight. He recorded 56 tackles (43 of them solo, 13 assisted), 7 sacks, and forced 2 fumbles. His 2011 season was cut short after a Week 3 injury against the Jets. He would be placed on injured reserve weeks after thus ending his season.

=== Arizona Cardinals ===
On March 15, 2013, Shaughnessy signed with the Arizona Cardinals. On September 5, 2015, he was released by the Cardinals.

=== New Orleans Saints ===
On August 3, 2016, Shaughnessy signed with the New Orleans Saints.

== NFL career statistics ==
Year	Team	Games		Tackles				Interceptions		Fumbles			
Year	Team	GP	GS	Comb	Solo	Ast	Sack	PD	Int	FF	FR	Yards	TD
2009	OAK	16	2	29	26	3	4.0	0	0	0	1	0	0
2010	OAK	16	8	56	43	13	7.0	1	0	2	0	0	0
2011	OAK	3	3	7	6	1	1.0	0	0	0	0	0	0
2012	OAK	16	16	31	25	6	3.5	0	0	0	0	0	0
2013	ARI	16	12	36	31	5	3.0	1	0	1	3	6	1
2014	ARI	8	7	17	12	5	0.0	0	0	0	0	0	0
Career		75	48	176	143	33	18.5	2	0	3	4	6	1
