= Lizanne Falsetto =

American entrepreneur

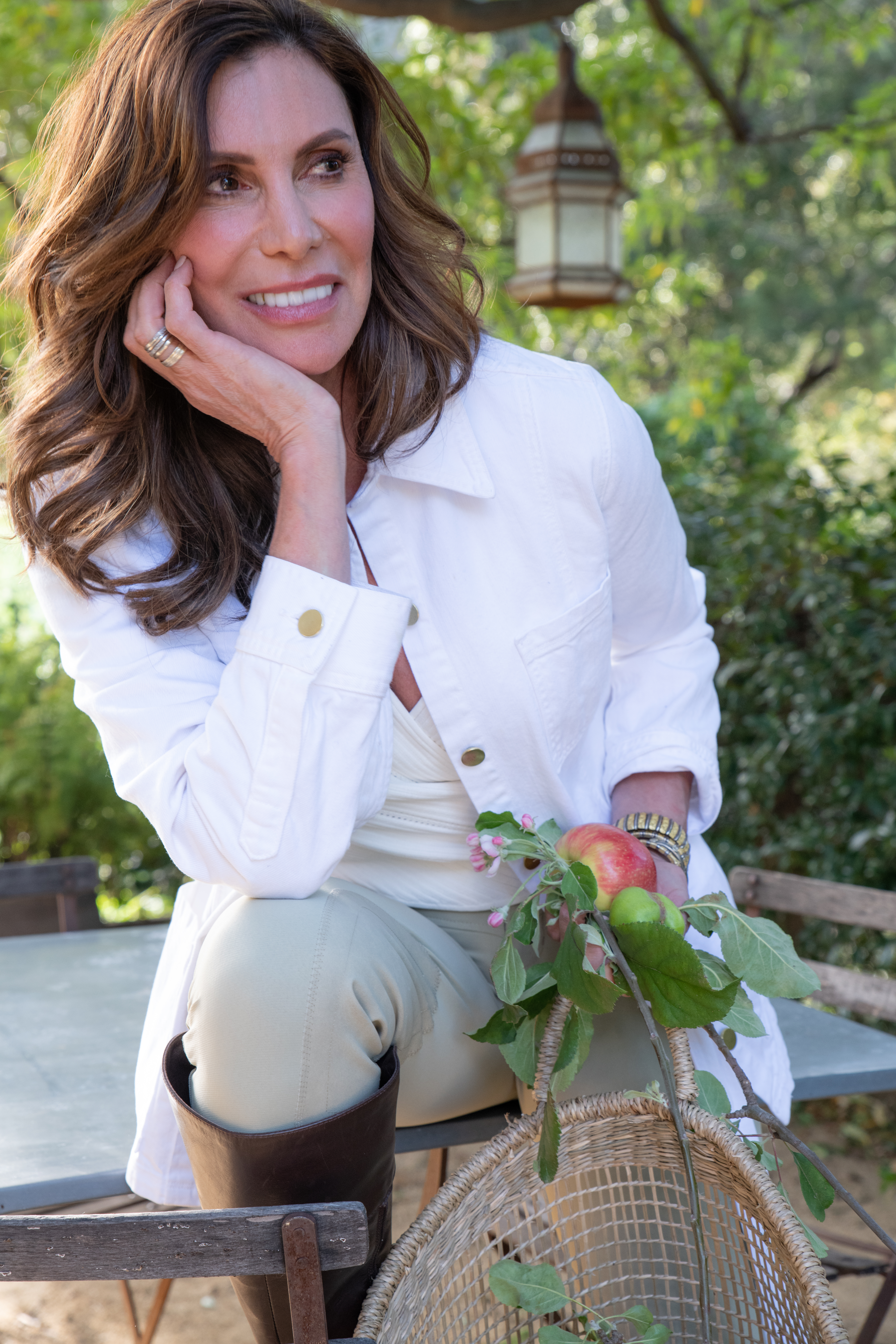
- Born: Seattle, Washington
- Occupation: Entrepreneur
- Awards: 3 time Indian Telly Awards National Association of Women Business Owners

Lizanne Falsetto is an American entrepreneur, wellness advisor, and public speaker.

== Early life and career ==
Lizanne Falsetto was born in Seattle, Washington, to a large Italian family. After graduating from John F. Kennedy Catholic High School in Burien, Washington, Falsetto became successful in international runway and print modeling, working for Ralph Lauren, Donna Karan, and Giorgio Armani in Tokyo, Paris, Milan and Sydney, throughout the 1990s.

== Career ==
In 1999, Falsetto created thinkThin bars, the first bar to have the "gluten free" label on its packaging, and became a trailblazer in the nutritional bar industry. In 2015, TSG Consumer Partners and Falsetto sold the thinkThin brand (founded in 1999) to Glanbia for $217 million.

== Honors and awards ==
Falsetto is a three-time Telly Award winner for producing and directing in the Best Documentary and Short Film category for films on female entrepreneurship, wellness, and nutrition. Falsetto was recognized with a Leadership Award from the National Association of Women Business Owners and the award of Entrepreneur of the Year for 2014 from Entrepreneur Magazine.

Falsetto raised $350,000 for women's cancer research and the Susan G. Komen for the Cure foundation, and hosted 2014 and 2015 benefits for Whole Planet Foundation micro-lending programs for women in developing countries.

Falsetto is a member of the Young Presidents' Organization, the World Presidents' Organization, and a founding member of the YPO/WPO Health & Wellness Group, which aims to teach healthy living to businesspeople.
