= Susie Galvez =

Suzie Galvez
- Occupation: Beautician

Susie Galvez is a beauty expert and a consultant in the U.S. spa industry. A frequent speaker at international spa conventions, she has been featured in radio and TV programs, and publications such as Allure, Elle, Good Housekeeping, Fitness, Self, Oxygen, Woman's World, Reader's Digest and on themagazine website iVillage.com.

== Career ==
Susie Galvez is the founder of Face Works Day Spa in Richmond, Virginia, which she owned from 1999 to 2006.

Galvez is the author of several books, including InSPAration (2002), a book designed to help salon and spa owners successfully grow their business; Hello Beautiful: 365 Ways to Be Even More Beautiful (2003), Weight Loss Wisdom: 365 Successful Dieting Tips (2004), and the four-part "Ooh La La" series, which includes Perfect Body, Perfect Makeup, Perfect Face, and Perfect Hair, the latter three co-written with Chico Hayasaki. Her most recent book is You Are So Going To Thank Me For This...How Real Women Conceal, Reveal, Find, Flaunt, Fake & Fix Just About Every Hair, Skin & Makeup Dilemma There Is (2011).

== Books ==
- Galvez, Susie (2002). InSPArations: Ideas, Tips & Techniques to Increase Employee Loyalty, Client Satisfaction, and Bottom Line Spa Profits. Priorities Publishing. ISBN 978-1-928948-06-3.
- Galvez, Susie (2003). Hello Beautiful: 365 Ways to Be Even More Beautiful. M Q Publications. ISBN 978-1-84072-443-1.
- Galvez, Susie (2004). Ooh la la! Perfect Body. Spruce Books. ISBN 978-1-84072-537-7.
- Galvez, Susie (2004). Ooh la la! Perfect Face. M Q Publications. ISBN 978-1-84072-590-2.
- Galvez, Susie (2004). Ooh la La! Perfect Hair. M Q Publications. ISBN 978-1-84072-591-9.
- Galvez, Susie (2004). Ooh la La! Perfect Make-Up. M Q Publications. ISBN 978-1-84072-592-6.
- Galvez, Susie (2004). Weight Loss Wisdom: 365 Successful Dieting Tips. M Q Publications. ISBN 978-1-84072-713-5.
- Galvez, Susie (2006). The Thrifty Girl's Guide To Glamour: Living the Beautiful Life on Little Or No Money. Adams Media. ISBN 1-59337-622-7.
- Galvez, Susie (2011). You Are So Going To Thank Me For This...How Real Women Conceal, Reveal, Find, Flaunt, Fake & Fix Just About Every Hair, Skin & Makeup Dilemma There Is. Priorities Publishing. ISBN 978-0-98330-220-9.
