= Despina Papadopoulos =

Despina Papadopoulos is the founder of the interactive design group Studio 5050 Ltd, a multidisciplinary design and strategy studio based in New York City. After spending a year working to revitalize traditional arts in Afghanistan as the director of business development for the Turquoise Mountain Foundation (funded by Charles, Prince of Wales), she founded Principled Design, an organization that creates shared frameworks and strategies for collaboration, development and change. Papadopoulos has been named one of New York City's "Six most interesting women in tech" and she is an adjunct professor at NYU's Tisch School of the Arts Interactive Telecommunications Program and a member of the faculty at the School of Visual Art's MFA in Design for Social Innovation.

== Education ==
Papadopoulos received her bachelor's and master's degrees in philosophy from the Catholic University of Leuven in Belgium. She also received a master's at NYU's Tisch School of the Arts Interactive Telecommunications Program.
