= Serena Guen =

British publisher and businesswoman

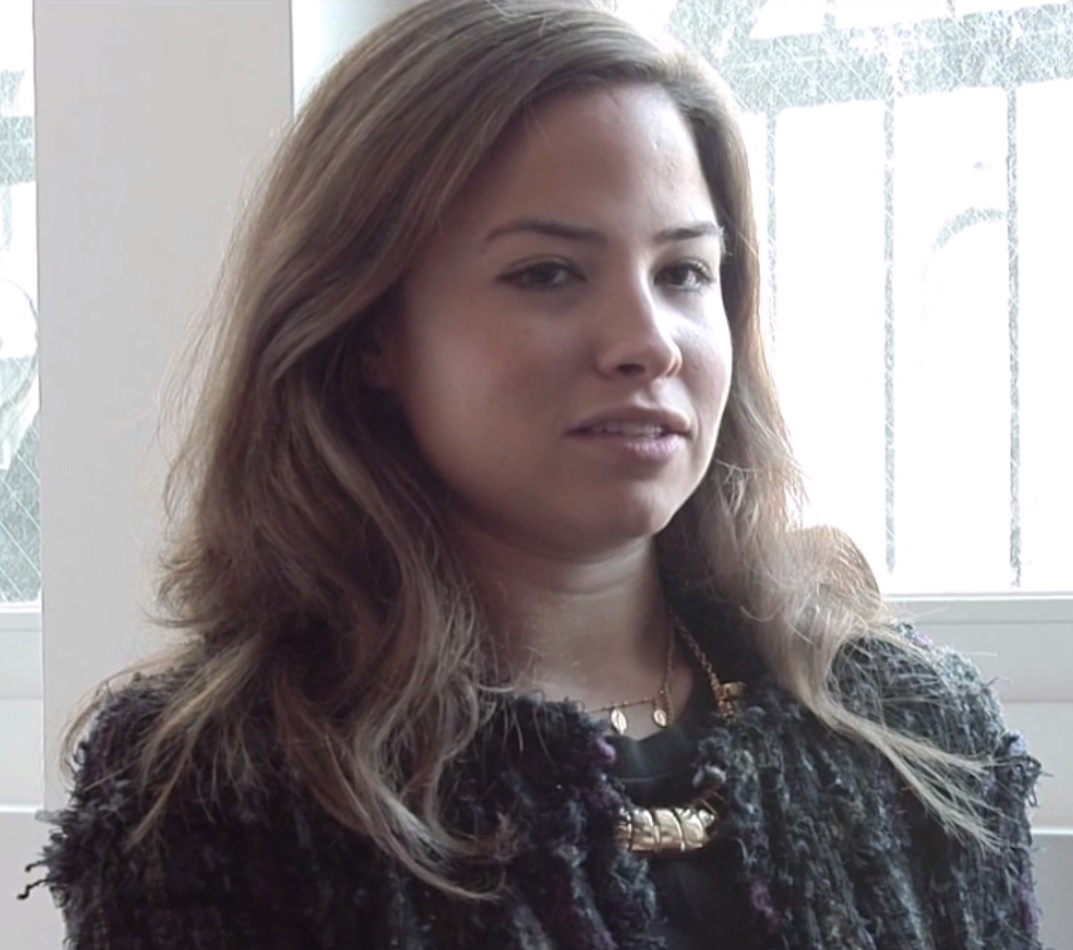
- Guen in 2013
- Born: Serena Anneliese Lucia Guen; 1990 (age 35–36)
- Other names: Serena Guen Macleod; Serena MacLeod
- Education: New York University
- Occupations: Founder and CEO of Suitcase Magazine
- Children: 1

Serena Guen (born 1990) is an English publisher, businesswoman and philanthropist based in London.

== Early life ==
Guen was born to an English-Italian mother and a German-Tunisian father and grew up in London.

== Career ==
In 2012, Guen founded Suitcase Magazine, a multimedia travel magazine from her dorm room at New York University. Guen ran it remotely during her senior year in New York City before eventually settling back in London. Suitcase prints four editions a year, in addition to its website which is updated daily, and is circulated globally across all seven continents.

Since 2014, Guen was part of the steering committee for UNICEF Next Generation London Team. In 2016, she founded the #CookForSyria movement with Clerkenwellboy. The movement raised money for UNICEF's Syria appeal in London, Sydney and Melbourne to date. It also produced two cookbook, Cook For Syria the Recipe Book (2016). and Bake For Syria (2018).

Guen has fronted campaigns for Jack Wills Young Briton's, Urban Outfitters and Clinique's Face Forward.

== Personal life ==
Guen married in September 2020. She has a daughter.

== Awards ==
- 2014: Winner, Media category, Women of the Future Awards
- 2016: Shortlisted, Young Travel Entrepreneur of the Year Award, Travel and Hospitality Hall of Fame, UK
- 2017: One of Forbes 30 under 30 for media

== See also ==
- Natalie Massenet
- Sheryl Sandberg
- Tavi Gevinson
