= Everrette Thompson =

American football player and coach (born 1989)

Washington State Cougars
- Title: Assistant defensive line coach

Personal information
- Born: December 18, 1989 (age 36); Renton, Washington, U.S.
- Listed height: 6 ft 6 in (1.98 m)
- Listed weight: 272 lb (123 kg)

Career information
- High school: John F. Kennedy Catholic (Burien, Washington)
- College: Washington (2008–2011)
- NFL draft: 2012: undrafted

Career history

Playing
- Arizona Cardinals (2012–2013)

Coaching
- Phoenix College (2015–2017) Special teams coordinator, linebackers coach, & defensive line coach; Northern Arizona (2018) Graduate assistant; Northern Arizona (2019–2021) Defensive line coach; Cal Poly (2022) Defensive quality control coach; Cal Poly (2023) Offensive quality control coach & special teams quality control coach; Cal Poly (2024) Special teams coordinator & assistant offensive line coach; Washington State (2025–present) Assistant defensive line coach
- Stats at Pro Football Reference

Everrette Thompson (born December 18, 1989) is an American college football coach and former defensive end. He is the assistant defensive line coach for Washington State University, a position he has held since 2025. He played college football for Washington. He signed with the Arizona Cardinals of the National Football League (NFL) as an undrafted free agent following the 2012 NFL draft. He has also coached for Phoenix College, and Northern Arizona.

== Playing career ==
=== High school ===
Thompson attended John F. Kennedy Catholic High School in Burien, Washington, where he excelled as a football player.

Honors:

- Named All-American by ‘’PrepStar and ‘’Superprep magazines
- Selected for the Offense-Defense All American Game at the end of his senior year
- Named to the 3A All State First Team as a defensive lineman by the Associated Press
- Named to the Seattle Times All State Team

=== College career ===
Thompson played for the University of Washington Huskies from 2008 to 2011. In his freshman year (2008), he played in 11 of the Huskies 12 games, starting in the final 3 games of the season. In his sophomore year, he played in 10 of 12 games, starting in 3 of the games. In his junior year, he started in all 13 games — at defensive tackle and at defensive end. In his final year, he also started in all 13 games — three at defensive tackle and the final 10 at defensive end.

=== Professional career ===
Thompson tried out for the Arizona Cardinals at their May 2012 rookie mini-camp. He remained a free agent until August 2012, when he was signed by the Cardinals. He played in four games in August 2012. He was released in 2014.

== Coaching career ==
In 2015, Thompson was hired as the special teams coordinator, linebackers coach, and defensive line coach for Phoenix College.

In 2018, Thompson was joined Northern Arizona as a graduate assistant. The following year he was promoted to defensive line coach.

In 2022, Thompson was hired as a defensive quality control coach for Cal Poly. In 2023, he was promoted to offensive quality control coach and special teams quality control coach. In 2024, he was promoted once again, this time to special teams coordinator and assistant offensive line coach.

In 2025, Thompson was hired as an assistant defensive line coach for Washington State.
