= Rob Housler =

American football player (born 1988)

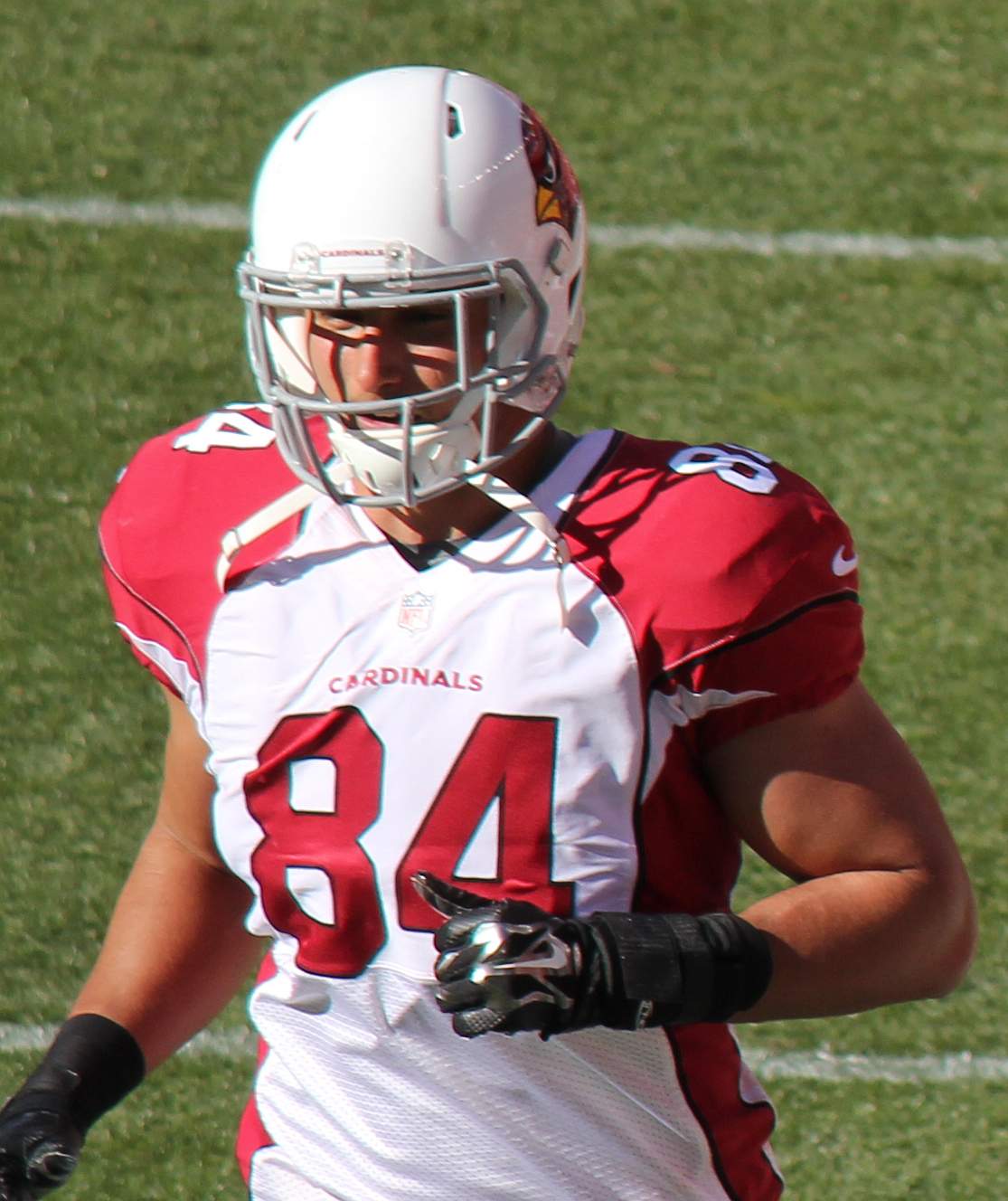
- Housler with the Arizona Cardinals in 2014

No. 84, 88
- Position: Tight end

Personal information
- Born: March 17, 1988 (age 38); El Paso, Texas, U.S.
- Listed height: 6 ft 5 in (1.96 m)
- Listed weight: 250 lb (113 kg)

Career information
- High school: Judson (Converse, Texas)
- College: Florida Atlantic
- NFL draft: 2011: 3rd round, 69th overall pick

Career history
- Arizona Cardinals (2011–2014); Cleveland Browns (2015); Chicago Bears (2015–2016); New England Patriots (2017)*
- * Offseason or practice squad member only

Awards and highlights
- Second-team All-Sun Belt (2010)

Career NFL statistics
- Receptions: 109
- Receiving yards: 1,166
- Receiving touchdowns: 1
- Stats at Pro Football Reference

Robert Gregory Housler Jr. (born March 17, 1988) is an American former professional football player who was a tight end in the National Football League (NFL). He played college football for the Florida Atlantic Owls and was selected by the Arizona Cardinals in the third round of the 2011 NFL draft. He was also a member of the Cleveland Browns, Chicago Bears and New England Patriots.

== Early life ==
He was born on March 17, 1988, in El Paso, Texas. He went to high school at Judson HS, and then went to college at Florida Atlantic.

== Professional career ==
Pre-draft measurables
Height	Weight	Arm length	Hand span	Wingspan	40-yard dash	10-yard split	20-yard split	20-yard shuttle	Three-cone drill	Vertical jump	Broad jump	Bench press
6 ft 5 3/8 in (1.97 m)	248 lb (112 kg)	34 1/2 in (0.88 m)	9 3/4 in (0.25 m)	6 ft 8 3/4 in (2.05 m)	4.46 s	1.58 s	1.67 s	4.21 s	6.90 s	37 in (0.94 m)	9 ft 9 in (2.97 m)	22 reps
All values are from NFL Combine

=== Arizona Cardinals ===
Housler was selected by the Arizona Cardinals in the third round (69th overall) in the 2011 NFL draft. In four seasons with the Cardinals, he totaled 105 receptions for 1,133 yards and one touchdown.

=== Cleveland Browns ===
On April 9, 2015, Housler signed a one-year deal with the Cleveland Browns. He was placed on injured reserve on November 4, 2015, with a hamstring injury, and was waived on November 17.

=== Chicago Bears ===
Housler was signed by the Chicago Bears on December 8, 2015. On March 14, 2016, he was re-signed by the Bears. He was released by the Bears on September 3, 2016.

=== New England Patriots ===
On January 19, 2017, Housler signed a reserve/future contract with the Patriots. He was released by the Patriots on May 17, 2017.

=== Statistics ===
Source: NFL.com

Year	Team	G	GS	Receiving					Fumbles	
Year	Team	G	GS	Rec	Yds	Avg	Lng	TD	FUM	Lost
Regular season
2011	ARI	12	2	12	133	11.1	21	0	1	1
2012	ARI	15	9	45	417	9.3	33	0	0	0
2013	ARI	13	10	39	454	11.6	31	1	1	0
2014	ARI	15	7	9	129	14.3	27	0	1	0
2015	CLE	6	0	1	6	6.0	6	0	0	0
2015	CHI	4	0	3	27	9.0	12	0	0	0
Total		65	28	109	1,166	10.7	33	1	3	1
Postseason
2014	ARI	1	1	0	0	0.0	0	0	0	0
Total		1	1	0	0	0.0	0	0	0	0
