= Jim Dray =

American football player and coach (born 1986)

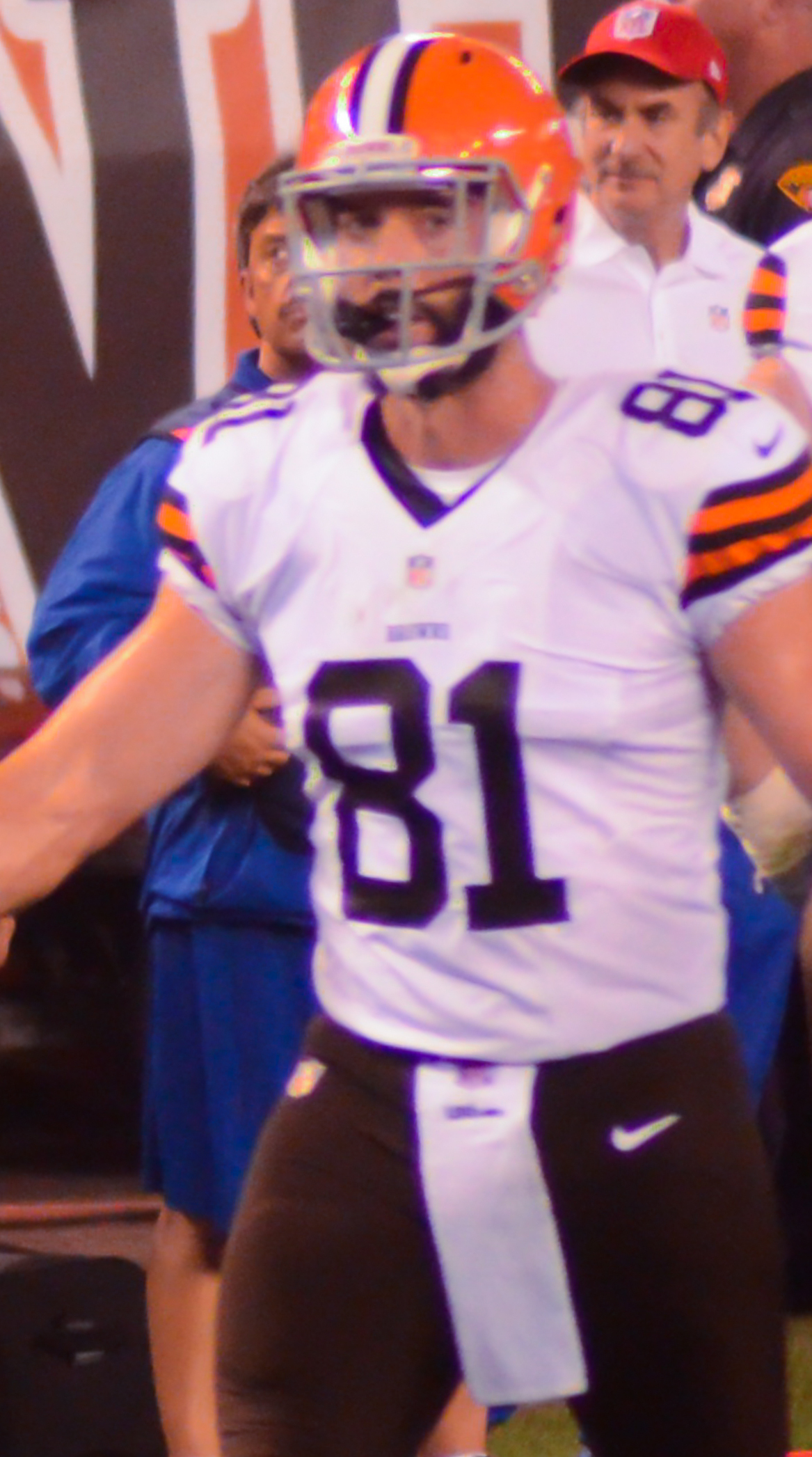
- Dray with the Cleveland Browns in 2014

Chicago Bears
- Title: Tight ends coach

Personal information
- Born: December 31, 1986 (age 39); New Milford, New Jersey, U.S.
- Listed height: 6 ft 5 in (1.96 m)
- Listed weight: 255 lb (116 kg)

Career information
- Position: Tight end (No. 81, 82, 49)
- High school: Bergen Catholic (Oradell, New Jersey)
- College: Stanford
- NFL draft: 2010: 7th round, 233rd overall pick

Career history

Playing
- Arizona Cardinals (2010–2013); Cleveland Browns (2014–2015); Buffalo Bills (2016); San Francisco 49ers (2016); Arizona Cardinals (2017)

Coaching
- Stanford (2018) Offensive assistant; Cleveland Browns (2019) Offensive quality control coach; Arizona Cardinals (2020–2021) Offensive quality control coach; Chicago Bears (2022–present) Tight ends coach

Awards and highlights
- Second-team All-Pac-10 (2009)

Career NFL statistics
- Receptions: 56
- Receiving yards: 605
- Receiving average: 10.8
- Receiving touchdowns: 3
- Stats at Pro Football Reference

James Russell Dray (born December 31, 1986) is an American football coach and former tight end who is currently the tight ends coach for the Chicago Bears of the National Football League (NFL). He played college football for the Stanford Cardinal and was selected by the Arizona Cardinals in the seventh round of the 2010 NFL draft. He also played for the Cleveland Browns, Buffalo Bills, and San Francisco 49ers.

== Early life ==
Born in New Milford, New Jersey, Dray grew up in nearby Paramus and played high school football at Bergen Catholic High School.

== Playing career ==
Pre-draft measurables
Height	Weight	Arm length	Hand span	40-yard dash	10-yard split	20-yard split	20-yard shuttle	Three-cone drill	Vertical jump	Broad jump	Bench press
6 ft 4 3/4 in (1.95 m)	246 lb (112 kg)	33 in (0.84 m)	10 1/8 in (0.26 m)	4.82 s	1.62 s	2.72 s	4.38 s	7.14 s	34.0 in (0.86 m)	9 ft 5 in (2.87 m)	19 reps
All values from NFL Combine/Pro Day

=== Arizona Cardinals (first stint) ===
On July 8, 2010, the Cardinals signed Dray to a four-year contract. The team did not announce the terms of the deal, but Adam Caplan of Foxsports.com reported that the contract was worth $1.84 million with a $49,000 signing bonus.

As a rookie in the 2010 season, Dray appeared in all 16 games and started three. He had three receptions for 47 yards on the year. In the 2011 season, Dray appeared in ten games and had two receptions for 25 yards. In the 2012 season, Dray appeared in 13 games and had two receptions for 15 yards to go with a special teams role.

Dray had a significant increase in usage in the offense in the 2013 season. He scored his first NFL touchdown in Week 5 against the Carolina Panthers. He had 26 receptions for 215 yards and two touchdowns in 16 games and 15 starts.

=== Cleveland Browns ===
On March 13, 2014, he signed with the Cleveland Browns. In the 2014 season, Dray appeared in 16 games and started ten. He finished the season with 17 receptions, for 242 yards, and one touchdown on 28 targets while having a special teams role. In Dray's 2015 season, he had six receptions for 61 yards and played special teams. He appeared in all 16 games and started ten. On February 18, 2016, Dray was released.

=== Buffalo Bills ===
Dray signed with the Buffalo Bills on March 16, 2016. After four games with the team, he was released on October 4, 2016.

=== San Francisco 49ers ===
Dray signed with the San Francisco 49ers on December 19, 2016. He appeared in six games and started two in the 2016 season.

=== Arizona Cardinals (second stint) ===
On September 15, 2017, Dray signed with the Cardinals, but was released four days later. He played in one game in the 2017 season, which was Week 2 against the Indianapolis Colts.

== Coaching career ==
=== Stanford ===
Following his playing career, Dray started his coaching career at his alma mater Stanford as an offensive assistant.

=== Cleveland Browns ===
In 2019, Dray was hired by the Cleveland Browns as an offensive quality control coach.

=== Arizona Cardinals ===
After a year with the Browns, Dray went to the Cardinals at the same position.

=== Chicago Bears ===
Dray was hired as the tight ends coach under new Bears head coach Matt Eberflus and offensive coordinator Luke Getsy on February 6, 2022. Under Dray, tight end Cole Kmet caught six touchdown passes in 2022 after failing to score the year before. When Shane Waldron became the new offensive coordinator in 2024, Dray was one of just two offensive assistants retained alongside offensive line coach Chris Morgan. The tight ends struggled in 2024 as did the rest of the offense, leading to nearly the entire staff being replaced by incoming head coach Ben Johnson.

Despite the poor 2024 season for the offense, Johnson kept Dray on his staff; he was the unit's only coach to not be fired. Dray continued to work with Kmet as well as first-round pick Colston Loveland, the latter going on to set franchise rookie records for tight ends.
