= Odyssey – The Essential School =

Coordinates: 47°26′08″N 122°16′38″W

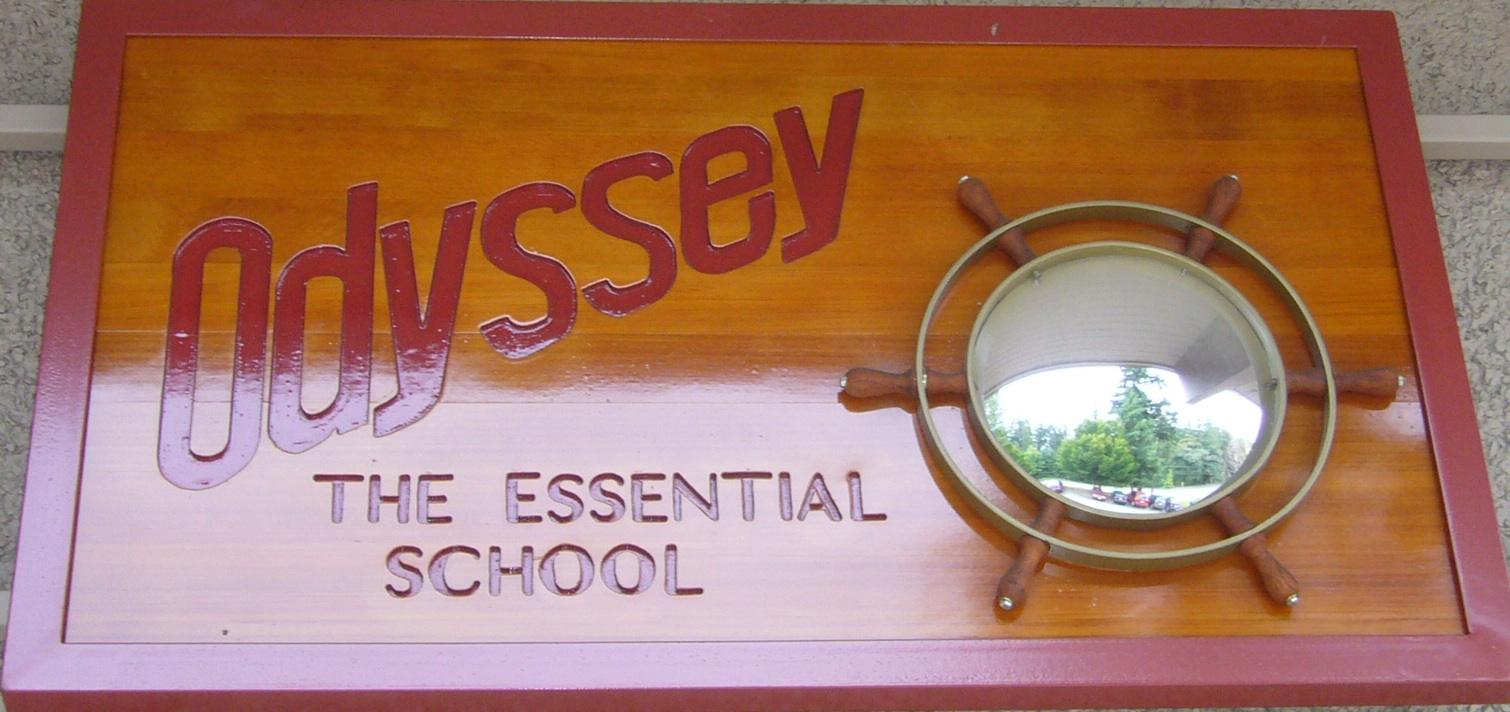
- A plaque in front of the school. The logo on the right shows a ship's steering wheel.

Location
- 4424 S 188th St #800; SeaTac, Washington, United States 98188

Information
- Type: Public
- School district: Highline School District
- Principal: Joan Ferrigno
- Faculty: 9
- Grades: 9–12
- Enrollment: 68 (May 2014)

Odyssey – The Essential School is a public high school in SeaTac, Washington. It is one of three small schools at the Tyee Educational Complex, along with the Academy of Citizenship and Empowerment and Global Connections High School. It was founded in 2005 when Tyee High School converted into these three schools, and accredited individually in 2006. It is operated by the Highline School District. Odyssey – The Essential School is closed down in 2014 due to overcrowding at Chinook Middle School.

The school's enrollment is 68, as required by the Coalition of Essential Schools in the conditions for the conversion grant. On the complex, Odyssey occupies the 800 building, on the top of the hill on the west side of campus, next to Chinook Middle School.

Odyssey combines with the other two Tyee schools to compete in athletics.
