= Tyee High School =

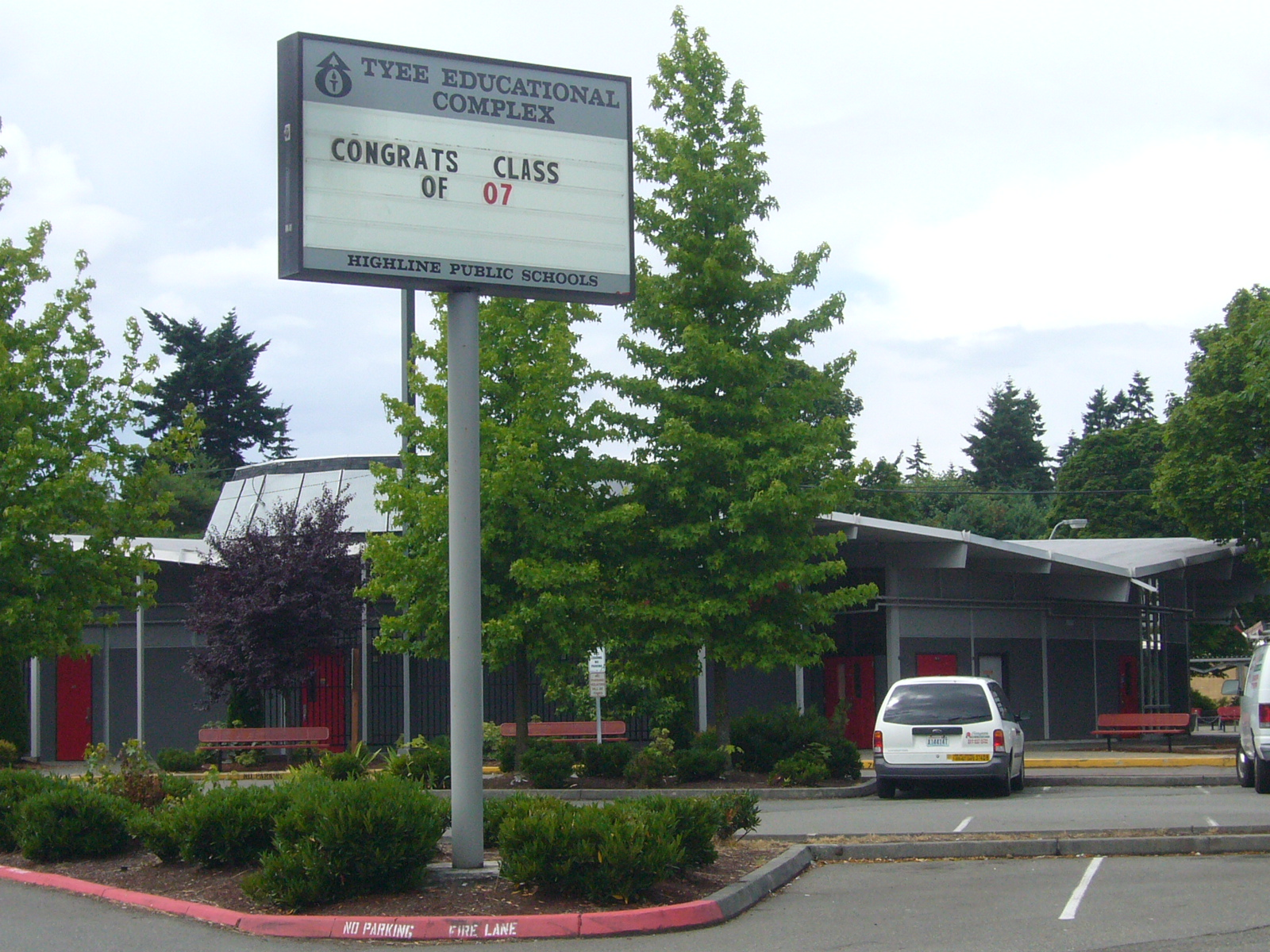
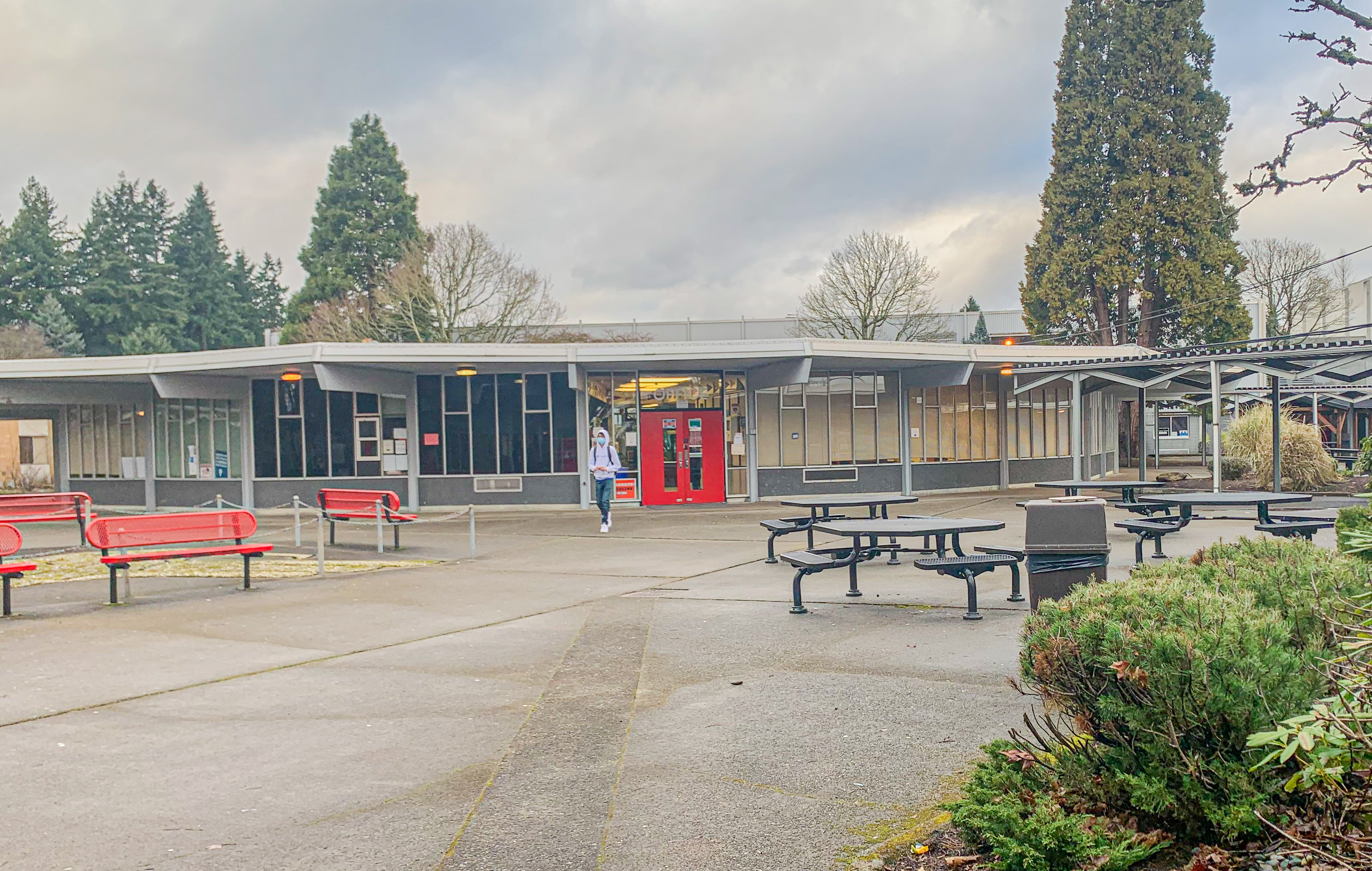
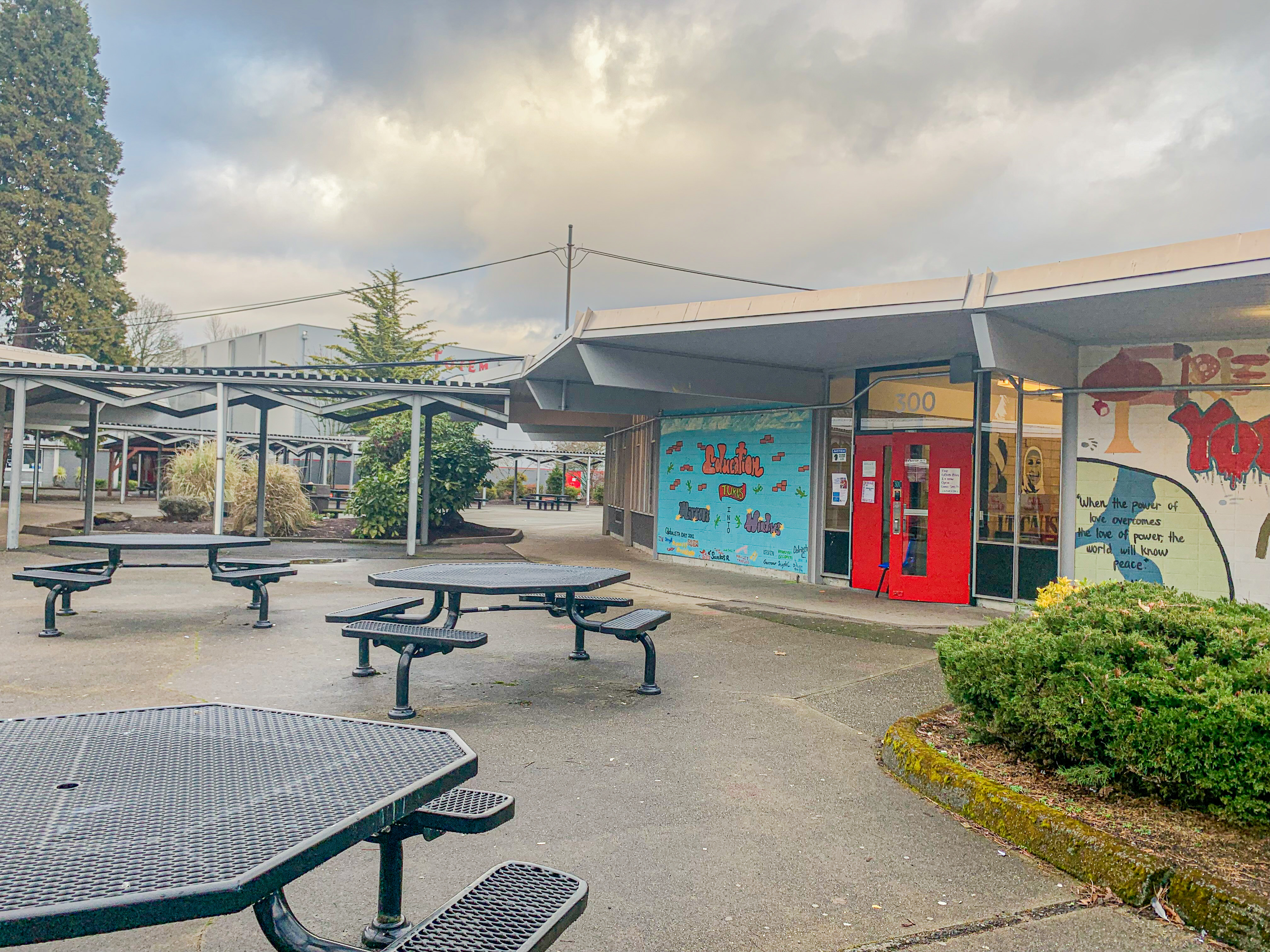
- Tyee Educational Complex Tyee Main Office in 2022 Tyee 300 building in 2022

Location
- 4424 South 188th Street; SeaTac, King County, Washington 98188–5097; United States; 47°26′5.082″N 122°17′7.124″W

Information
- Type: public high school
- Motto: Tyee CARES: Collaborate, Achieve, Respect, Empower, Support
- Established: 1963
- School district: Highline Public Schools No. 401
- Principal: Victoria Terry
- Staff: 36.52 (FTE)
- Faculty: 82
- Grades: 9 to 12
- Age range: 14 to 21
- Enrollment: 607 (2023–24)
- Student to teacher ratio: 18.46
- Language: 50% English; 50% Spanish
- Colors: Red, gold, and black
- Mascot: Tyee Titans
- Nickname: Titans
- Accreditation: accredited as a public school
- Affiliation: Highline School District
- Website: tyee.highlineschools.org

Tyee High School, formerly Tyee Educational Complex, is a public high school campus located in SeaTac, Washington, United States. It was founded as Tyee High School, a single public high school, in 1962. It is operated by the Highline Public Schools.

Starting in the 2005–2006 academic year, it was split from a single school into three smaller high schools. In 2011 it was turned into two small schools now known as Academy of Citizenship and Empowerment and Global Connections High School as a part of the small schools movement. It is also a member of the Coalition of Essential Schools.

== History ==
In 1963, Tyee High School was founded as a part of the Highline School District to serve an area between Burien and Des Moines in the west, and Tukwila in the east, which would later become the city of SeaTac.

In 1993, one of Tyee's distinguished teachers was recognized by the state of Washington for building an observatory on school grounds, one of the few in the nation at the time, with the State's Golden Apple award.

== Small schools conversion ==
In the years prior to the conversion, Tyee suffered from severe discipline and academic performance issues. New principal Max Silverman and the district's deputy superintendent, John Welch, knew that change was necessary and began to talk about how to improve the situation. In 2003, the school received a grant from the Discuren Foundation to begin research.

Over the next several years, Silverman and Welch led the research, including traveling to other high schools across the nation to note what made such schools successful. This research led the staff to decide that a small school approach was the best way to improve the school's standing. In the 2004–2005 school year, the school instituted freshman "houses" intended to give incoming students more personalized instruction. The staff noted significant improvements, which support the idea of small, autonomous schools.

In 2004, Tyee received a large grant from the Coalition of Essential Schools to be used in the conversion process. In addition, they, along with the district's other three schools, received a Department of Education Small Learning Community grant. In 2005 the Bill & Melinda Gates Foundation awarded a grant to the district, a significant portion of which went towards Tyee.

Beginning in the 2005–2006 school year, Tyee ceased to operate as a single comprehensive high school and was split into the three small schools, as noted above. However, it was still recognized by the state as a single school, and thus its graduates received Tyee High School diplomas, and WASL scores were reported only for Tyee as a whole. The schools first held individual graduation ceremonies in 2007. In the same year, WASL scores were reported individually for each school.

== About the school ==
Tyee high school is diverse in culture and language among its student population. The enrollment rate of minorities are 90%, which is almost all students that are enrolled and 81% of those students are economically disadvantaged. This school has an average of 981 students enrolled every year. Tyee is also ranked 231st out of 300 in Washington State. As other high schools, Tyee provides students with Advanced Placement exams for students who wants to challenge themself and be prepared for college while they're in High school.

== Enrollment ==
School Years	Total Student Enrollment
2005–06	303 at ACE; 281 at Odyssey; 273 at Global; Total: 857
2014–15	415 at ACE and 499 at Global; Total: 914
2015–16	450 at ACE and 515 at Global; Total: 965
2016–17	470 at ACE and 518 at Global; Total: 988
2017–18	1,018
2018–19	922
2019–20	908
2020–21	835
2021–22	696
2022–23	678
2023–24	607

In the years preceding the conversion, Tyee's enrollment was at just below 607 students. As a condition of the Coalition of Essential Schools grant, the small schools were to each have no more than 300 students, resulting in the complex's total enrollment being closer to 900. In the first two years of having small schools, students were not allowed to enroll in a specific school. Instead, being placed into one of the three depending on various factors. Beginning in the 2007–2008 school year, students were allowed to enroll in the school of their choice.

=== Race/Ethnicity ===
In 2023–2024, Tyee's enrollment number is 607. In detail, out of the 607 students, 2 (0.33%) were American Indian/Alaska Natives, 71 (11.70%) were Asian, 120 (19.77%) were Black/African American, 263 (43.33%) were Hispanic or Latino of any race(s), 77 (12.69%) were Native Hawaiian/Other Pacific Islander, 25 (4.12%) were Two or More Races, and 49 (8.07%) were White.

== Tyee DECA ==
In 2017, eleven students from DECA qualified for international competitions. Since Tyee is near the Airport, Alaska Airlines donated four round-trip tickets to support students. AT&T also supported Tyee DECA students by donating almost $10,000 to help students succeed.

== Staff diversity ==
According to Crosscut, "White educators made up approximately 88% of classroom teachers during the 2018–2019 year." However, the population of students of color is approximately 47% of the population. Even though Tyee has become very diverse in race and culture students-wise, the majority of teachers have remained white. As reported by, Washington Office of Superintendent of Public Instruction that 66.1% of Tyee educators remain white. However, the population of students of color at Tyee remains relatively lower than the population of white educators.

== School facilities ==
The complex's layout, with ACE portion in blue, Global in green, and Odyssey in red. Shared space is shaded grey.

The complex consists of several small circular buildings, as well as two larger buildings. As Tyee initially existed as a single school, adjusting to three small schools has been difficult. The cafeteria (100), library (500), gymnasiums, locker rooms (part of 700 building), and clinic (900) are operated by the complex and are shared equally by all three schools. In addition, the 200 building, which contains science equipment which cannot easily be moved, is shared by the three schools; however, unlike the other buildings, each school is responsible for different rooms of the building.

Other parts of the complex are occupied by individual schools. Global Connections occupies the 300 and 600 buildings on the east side of the complex. ACE occupies the classrooms of the 700 building, which excludes portions operated by the complex, such as the gymnasiums. Odyssey occupies the 800 building, a large building at the top of the hill on the western side of the complex. This building was once part of neighboring Chinook Middle School, but since the 1981–1982 school year, it has been used by Tyee, and eventually Odyssey.

== Levenhagen Observatory ==
The Levenhagen Observatory is an astronomical observatory owned and operated by Tyee High School. It is named after Physics/Astronomy teacher Warren Levenhagen.

== Extracurricular activities ==
=== Sports ===
Athletics are one of the few areas in which all three schools remain combined, as it is unlikely that any of the individual schools would have the ability to field a full team in any event. The sports teams are called the Totems, after the traditional Native American totem poles. The complex as a whole fields varsity teams in football, cross country, soccer, volleyball, swimming, basketball, gymnastics, wrestling, baseball, fastpitch, tennis, and track and field. Football currently co-ops to Mount Rainier and play as the Rams.

Tyee's sports teams are members of the Sound Division of the South Puget Sound League (2A) as of the 2016–2017 school year.

Tyee has earned three state championships in its history, in cross country in 1975 and 1976, and girls' soccer in 1984.

== Famous alumni ==
- Adam Smith (politician), Democratic member of the United States House of Representatives since 1997.
- Gary Ridgway, serial killer, known to have killed at least 49 women and teenaged girls.
- Steve Pool, weather anchor for KOMO-TV in Seattle.
