= Big Picture High School =

Big Picture High School may refer to:

- Big Picture High School in Bloomfield, Connecticut
- Big Picture High School in St. Louis, Missouri
- Big Picture High School in LaFayette, New York
- Big Picture High School in Nashville, Tennessee
- Big Picture High School in South Burlington, Vermont
- Big Picture High School in Tulsa, Oklahoma
- Big Picture High School in Bloomfield, Connecticut
- Big Picture High School in Durango, Colorado
- Highline Big Picture School in Burien, Washington
- Bellevue Big Picture School in Bellevue, Washington
- Big Picture Middle and High School in Fresno, California
- Big Picture Academy at Northwest in St. Louis, Missouri
