= Raisbeck Aviation High School =

Public, STEM (aviation, aerospace) school in Renton, Washington, United States

Location
- 9229 E Marginal Way; Tukwila, Washington 98108; United States; 47°31′15″N 122°18′02″W

Information
- Type: Public, STEM (Aviation, Aerospace)
- Motto: "The Sky is not the Limit"
- Established: 2004
- School district: Highline Public Schools
- Principal: Jeff Black (Interim)
- Teaching staff: 19.80 (FTE)
- Enrollment: 400 (2024–2025)
- Student to teacher ratio: 20.20
- Colors: Red, Black, Gold, White
- Mascot: Friday the Phoenix
- Website: Raisbeck Aviation H.S.
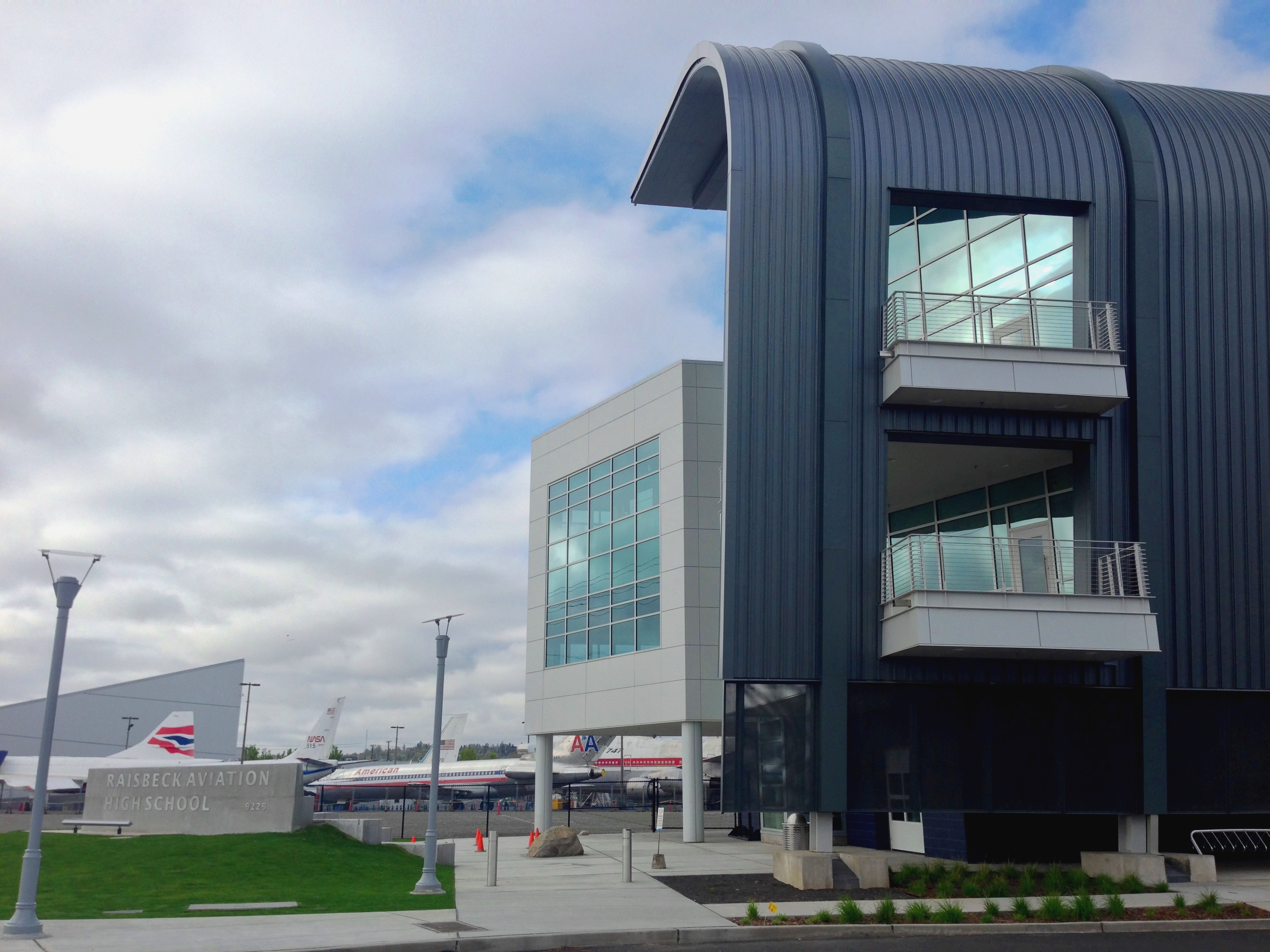
- Street view of RAHS with the Airpark's historic pioneering aircraft in the background

Raisbeck Aviation High School (RAHS), part of the Highline School District, is located in Tukwila, Washington. The school is an aviation- and aerospace-themed STEM school and one of the Highline School District's small schools. It is focused on preparing students for college, careers, and citizenship. The school serves about 400 students in grades 9-12 from around Puget Sound. Until 2013 it was known as Aviation High School. It is next to the Museum of Flight's Aviation Pavilion exhibit near King County International Airport.

== Academics ==
The school's approach to learning is project-based with an additional emphasis on the students presenting and defending their learning in front of industry experts.

== Admission ==
Since the 2016 student admissions, an Admissions lottery process used in charter schools was implemented by the Superintendent's mandate.

Before the Class of 2020, admission to RAHS was based primarily on demonstrating an interest in and evidence of pursuing the fields of aviation and aerospace. Each applicant is interviewed by a panel for 90 minutes and must complete a 12-page application where they convey evidence for interest in attending a specialized context for learning. Only 100 students are accepted yearly (approx. >30% acceptance rate), although in the 07-08 year 124 students were accepted.

== Recognition ==
The school was designated by the Washington State legislature as a "lighthouse model of STEM education", which recognizes the school's best practices and student achievement results. RAHS has been designated by the State of Washington as one of a select few Designated Existing Innovative Schools that have implemented "bold, creative, and innovative" ideas. RAHS was ranked #1 among best high schools in Washington state by U.S. News & World Report in April 2016.

== History ==
From 2004 to 2007, the school was located at the South Seattle Community College - Duwamish campus. From 2007 to 2013, it was housed at the former Olympic Elementary School, the previous (temporary) location of Mount Rainier High School. Construction of new facilities commenced in August 2011 and opened on September 9, 2013, renamed Raisbeck Aviation High School after major donors James D. Raisbeck and Sherry Raisbeck.

== Facilities ==
The new 3-story, 72,000 square foot facility was designed by Bassetti Architects. The key design feature is the building's form, with a curved cross-section inspired by the leading edge of a wing. The design received the 2011 People's Choice Award and Polished Apple Merit Award from the regional chapter of Council of Educational Facilities Planners International.

The facility is located on land owned by the Museum of Flight. Of the $44 million cost for the new facilities, 35% was through donations by individuals and private foundations, 32% by the school district, 23% by the Port of Seattle, 9% by the State of Washington, and 1% by the federal government.

== See also ==
- Aviation High School
