= Global Connections High School =

Coordinates: 47°26′08″N 122°16′38″W

Location
- 4424 S 188th St #300; SeaTac, Washington, United States 98188

Information
- Type: Public
- School district: Highline School District
- Principal: Rick Harwood (2006-2015); Nicole S. Fitch (2015-2023)
- Faculty: 32
- Grades: 9–12
- Enrollment: 499 (May 2015)

Global Connections High School was a public high school in SeaTac, Washington. It was one of three small schools at the Tyee Educational Complex, along with the Academy of Citizenship and Empowerment and Odyssey-The Essential School. It was founded in 2005 when Tyee High School converted into three schools, and accredited individually in 2006. Global Connections High School merged with the Academy of Citizenship and Empowerment again after the 2016–2017 school year ended. They are now Tyee High School again. It is operated by the Highline School District.

The school's enrollment was 499, as required by the Coalition of Essential Schools in the conditions for the conversion grant. On the complex, Global Connections occupied the 300, 600 and 900 buildings on the east side of the complex.

Global Connections combined with the other two Tyee schools to compete in athletics. Though the students who wished to play football had to travel to another school to be a part of their team as they had not had their own football team for quite some time.

In 2022, a bond project was issued to have the school demolished and remolded into an Evergreen High School. It opened in 2025.
