= Academy of Citizenship and Empowerment =

Coordinates: 47°26′08″N 122°16′38″W

Location
- 4424 S 188th St #700; SeaTac, Washington, United States 98188

Information
- Type: Public
- Founded: 2005
- School district: Highline School District
- Principal: Philip Willenbrock
- Faculty: 21
- Grades: 9–12
- Enrollment: 410 (May 2015)

The Academy of Citizenship and Empowerment (ACE) is a public high school in SeaTac, Washington. It is one of two small schools at the Tyee Educational Complex, along with Global Connections High School. It was founded in 2005 when Tyee High School converted into these two schools, and accredited individually in 2006. It is operated by the Highline School District.

The school's enrollment is 410, as required by the Coalition of Essential Schools in the conditions for the conversion grant. On the complex, ACE occupies the classroom portions of the 700 building, which excludes the gymnasiums and locker rooms.

ACE combines with the other two Tyee schools to compete in athletics.
