= Highline Public Schools =

School district in Washington, United States

Location
- 15675 Ambaum Boulevard SW; Burien; Washington Burien, Des Moines, Normandy Park, SeaTac, White Center, and areas of unincorporated King County (such as White Center and Boulevard Park) in Washington King County, Washington; United States

District information
- Type: Public
- Motto: EVERY STUDENT in Highline Public Schools is known by name, strength and need, and graduates prepared for the future they choose.
- Grades: K through 12
- Established: 1924
- Superintendent: Dr. Ivan Duran
- NCES District ID: 5303540

Students and staff
- Students: 17,563 (2022-2023)
- Teachers: 1,193 (2022-2023)
- Student–teacher ratio: 15.1:1

Other information
- Website: www.highlineschools.org

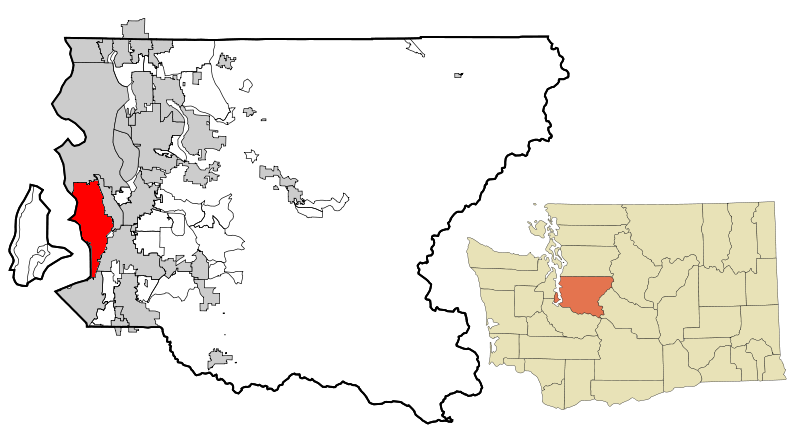
Location of the HSD 401 territory within Washington

Location of Washington within the United States

Highline Public Schools (HPS) is a public school district in King County, headquartered in Burien, Washington. As of October 2007, it served 17,331 students and had 997 teachers, and served the cities of Burien, much of Des Moines, Normandy Park, and SeaTac as well as adjacent unincorporated census-designated places proximal to Burien in King County such as White Center and much of Boulevard Park. Portions of Kent and Tukwila and a very small portion of Seattle are in the district limits.

== Structure ==
Highline consists of four main "service areas", Evergreen (the area around White Center), Highline (in Burien), Mount Rainier (mainly Des Moines, but includes parts of Burien), and Tyee (SeaTac), which once represented the district's four high schools. Each service area also contains one middle school which acts as a feeder to the area's high school(s). The four service areas are further divided into separate areas corresponding to the district's elementary schools, which also act as feeders to the area's middle school.

The district's current superintendent is Dr. Ivan Duran. The school board consists of five members: Joe Van (Board President), Angelica Alvarez (Vice President), Aaron Garcia, Carrie Howell, and Azeb Hagos.

== History ==
The district's first school, Highline High School, opened in 1924 in Burien. Evergreen High School (just east of Seattle's Arbor Heights neighborhood), Glacier High School, Mount Rainier High School (in Des Moines), and Tyee High School (in SeaTac) were added at later times to compensate for the district's growing population.

During the 1970s, enrollment in the district declined due to the impacts of the Boeing Bust, The Port of Seattle acquiring neighborhoods due to increases in jet noise from Sea-Tac Airport, and levy failures. Between 1975 and 1980, one high school, five junior high schools, and fourteen elementary schools were closed. In 1980, the remaining junior high schools were converted into middle schools.

In the mid-2000s, Highline commenced a major effort to reverse its schools' declining performance. The most significant aspect of this effort was the conversion of Evergreen and Tyee into three small schools each. Highline and Mount Rainier underwent similar programs, however each remains a single comprehensive high school. In the same time frame, Aviation High School and Highline Big Picture, two specialized schools, opened.

=== Governance, Community Controversy, and Equity Concerns (2025–2026) ===
In the mid-2020s, governance and leadership practices within the Highline Public Schools administration became subjects of significant local debate. Operational and cultural tensions led to high-profile disruptions on the Highline School Board. In January 2025, Board Directors Melissa Petrini and Azeb Hagos resigned simultaneously. During public proceedings, departing board leadership cited an administrative culture of "pure contempt," alleging that a "wedge of distrust" had been created between central leadership and the broader community, which ran counter to the district's publicly messaged focus on inclusivity.

These administrative and community conflicts escalated further into 2026 following a series of sudden building-level leadership changes enacted by Superintendent Dr. Ivan Duran. The central office initially announced forced reassignments of several long-standing principals, drawing widespread community pushback. Following public scrutiny, district administration reversed its decision regarding the principal of North Hill Elementary, allowing her to remain in her building role. However, other reassignments moved forward, including a forced leadership transfer at Tyee High School. Staff and families at Tyee High School were excluded from participating in the selection process for their new campus leadership, instead receiving an administrator transferred directly from Sylvester Middle School without community input or collaboration.

During a June 2026 school board meeting, an organized coalition of parents, students, and community members delivered public testimony opposing the administration's patterns of top-down mandates and a perceived lack of operational transparency. The controversy surrounding the Raisbeck Aviation High School (RAHS) principal transition intensified when the district's official graduation program revealed that the campus's long-standing principal, Mrs. Tipton, had been completely excluded from the ceremony lineup, with central office administrators confirming she was barred from participating in commencement exercises with the graduating senior class.`[image_12.png]` Community advocates increasingly raised public allegations of institutional gender bias and discrimination, arguing that the administration's heightened scrutiny, forced reassignments, and administrative isolation disproportionately targeted successful female leaders across district buildings. Local commentators warned that these compounding administrative and equity issues could severely weaken public trust, threatening the passage of upcoming school capital bonds and operational levies.

== Schools ==
=== High schools ===
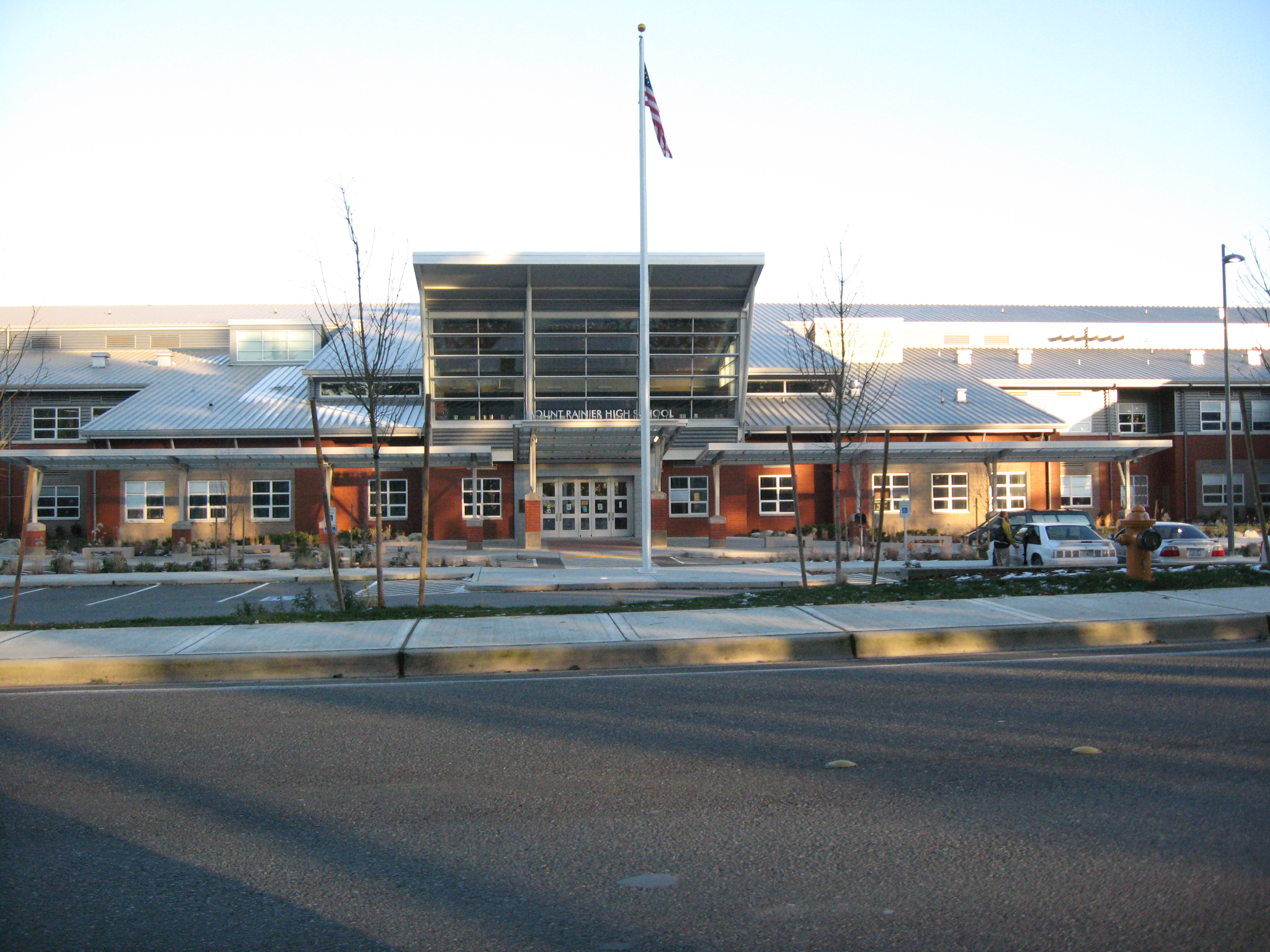
Mount Rainier High School

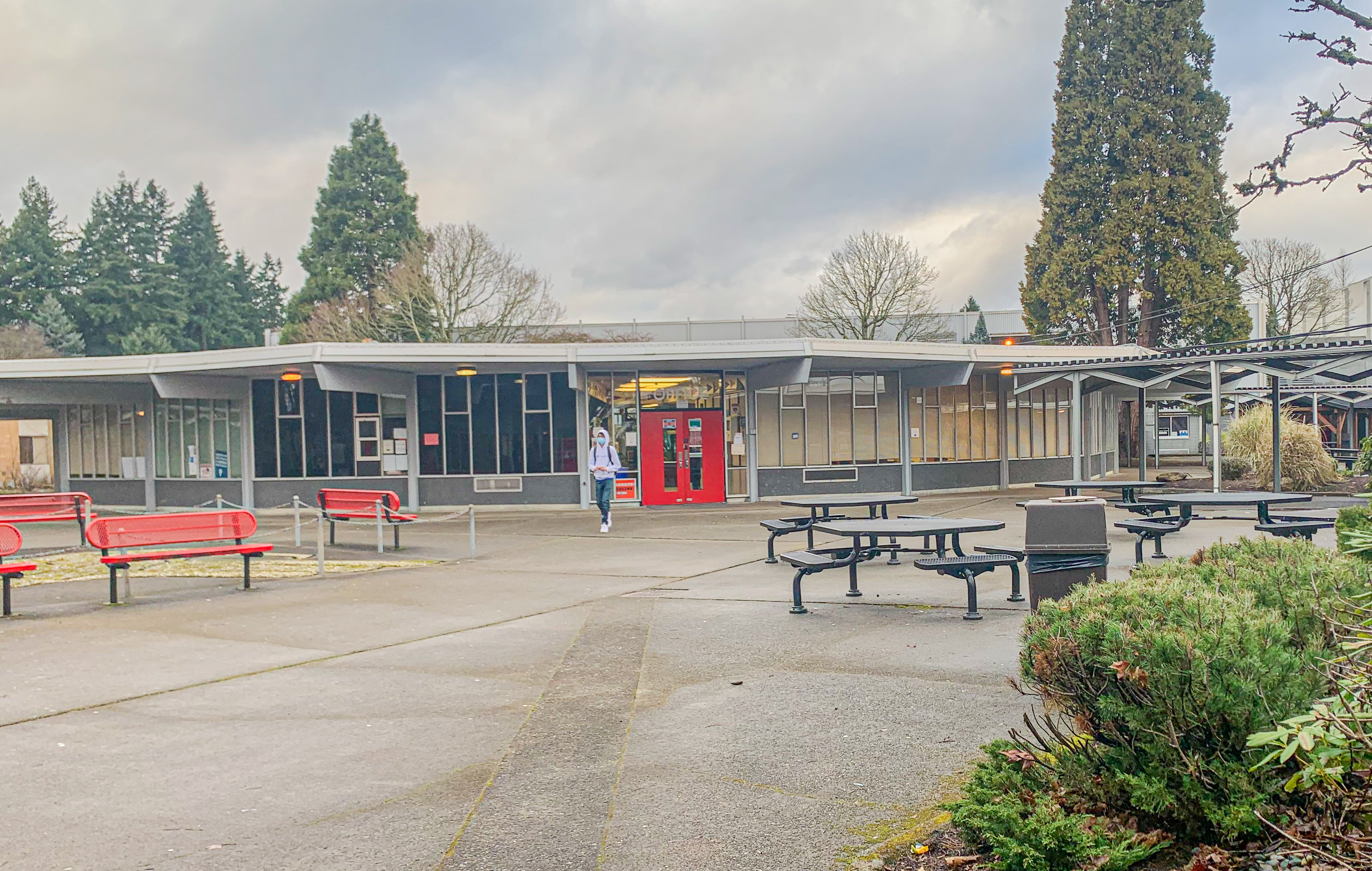
Tyee High School

Zoned

- Evergreen High School (White Center)
- Glacier High School 2450 S. 142nd St, Seattle, WA 98168 (defunct 1960-1980)
- Highline High School [1] 225 S. 152nd St., Burien, WA 98148 (1924-2019)
- Highline High School [2] Burien, WA 98148 (Opening 2021)
- Mount Rainier High School (Des Moines)
- Olympic Interim High School 615 S. 200th St., Des Moines, WA 98198 (opening 2019)
- Satellite Alternative High School 440 S. 186th St, Burien, WA 98148 (defunct 1979-1996)
- Tyee High School 4424 S. 188th St., Seattle, WA 98188 (defunct 1963-2005, 2017- )
- Tyee Educational Complex (SeaTac) Tyee was split into 3 high schools.(2005-2017 )
1. Academy of Citizenship and Empowerment; Tyee Educational Complex
2. Global Connections High School; Tyee Educational Complex
3. Odyssey – The Essential School; Tyee Educational Complex
- Highline Big Picture (Burien)
- Raisbeck Aviation High School (Tukwila)
- Highline Choice Academy (Burien)

=== Middle schools ===
- Cascade Middle School 11212 10th Ave. SW, Seattle, WA 98146 (1980- )
- Chinook Middle School 18650 42nd Ave S., Seattle, WA 98188 (1980- )
- Glacier Middle School, 2450 S. 142nd St., SeaTac, WA (2019- )
- Pacific Middle School 22705 24th Ave. S., Des Moines, WA 98198 (1980- )
- Sylvester Middle School 16222 Sylvester Rd., Burien, WA 98166 (1980- )

=== Junior high schools ===
- Cascade Junior High 11212 10th Ave. SW, Seattle, WA 98146 (defunct 1957-1980)
- Chinook Junior High 18650 42nd Ave. S., Seattle, WA 98188 (defunct 1957-1980)
- Glendale Junior High 1201 S 104th St, Seattle, WA 98168 (defunct 1963-1978)
- Olympic Junior High 615 S 200th St, Des Moines, WA 98198 (defunct 1955-1979)
- Pacific Junior High 22705 24th Ave. S., Des Moines, WA 98198 (Defunct 1960-1980)
- Puget Sound Junior High 135 SW 126th St., Seattle, WA 98146 (defunct 1949-1981)
- Seahurst Junior High 14603 14th Ave SW, Burien, WA 98166 (defunct 1960-1976)
- Sunset Junior High 1809 S 140th St, Seattle, WA 98168 (defunct 1957-1975)
- Sylvester Junior High School 16222 Sylvester Rd., Burien, WA 98166 (defunct 1953-1980)

=== Elementary schools ===
- Angle Lake Elementary 19215 - 28th Ave. S., Seattle, WA 98188 (defunct 1928-1975)
- Beverly Park Elementary [1] 11427 - 3rd Ave. S., Seattle, WA 98168 (defunct 1950-1992)
- Beverly Park Elementary [2] 1201 S. 104th St., Seattle, WA 98168 (Formerly Glendale Jr. High)(1992- )
- Boulevard Park Elementary 12833 20th Ave S, Seattle, WA 98166 (defunct 1937-1980)
- Bow Lake Elementary School (SeaTac)
- Burien Heights Elementary, 1210 SW 136th St., Burien, WA 98146 (defunct 1955-1975)
- Cedarhurst Elementary School (Burien)
- Chelsea Park Elementary 425 SW 144th St., Burien, WA 98166 (defunct 1948-1976)
- Crestview Elementary 16200 42nd Ave. S, Seattle, WA 98188 (defunct 1958-1976)
- Des Moines Elementary School [1] 22001 9th Ave. S., Des Moines, WA 98198 (defunct 1925-2019)
- Des Moines Elementary School [2] 23801 16th Ave. S., Des Moines, WA 98198 (Opening in 2019)
- Gregory Heights Elementary (Burien)
- Hazel Valley Elementary (Burien)
- Hilltop Elementary School (Unincorporated area)
- Lake Burien Elementary 14660 18th Ave. SW, Burien, WA 98166 (defunct 1926-1976)
- Lakeview Elementary 15820 6th Ave. SW, Burien, WA 98166 (defunct 1955-1975)
- Madrona Elementary School [1] 3030 S. 204th St. Seattle, WA 98198 (defunct 1959-2003)
- Madrona Elementary School [2] 20301 32nd Ave. S., SeaTac, WA 98198 (opened in 2004)
- Manhattan Elementary 440 S. 186th St, Seattle, WA 98148 (defunct 1960-1979)
- Marvista Elementary School (Normandy Park)
- Maywood Elementary School 1410 S. 200th St, Seattle, WA 98198 (defunct 1958-1975)
- McMicken Heights Elementary School (SeaTac)
- Midway Elementary School (Des Moines)
- Mount View Elementary School (White Center)
- Normandy Park Elementary 801 SW 174th St, Normandy Park, WA 98166 (defunct 1954-1981)
- North Hill Elementary School (Des Moines)
- Olympic Elementary @ Olympic 615 S 200th St., Des Moines, WA 98198 (defunct 1979-2005)
- Parkside Elementary School (Des Moines)
- Riverton Heights Elementary 3011 S. 148th St, Seattle, WA 98168 (defunct 1953-1998)
- Salmon Creek Elementary 614 SW 120th St, Seattle, WA 98146 (defunct 1958-2005)
- Seahurst Elementary School [1] 14603 14th Ave SW, Burien, WA 98166 Burien, WA (defunct 1976-1991)
- Seahurst Elementary School [2] 14603 14th Ave. S.W., Burien, WA 98166 (1992- )
- Shorewood Elementary School (Burien)
- Southern Heights Elementary School (defunct 1955-2022)
- Sunnydale Elementary 15631 8th Ave S, Burien, WA (defunct 1904-1938; 1939-1981; 1989-2005)
- Sunny Terrace Elementary 1010 S 146th St, Burien, WA 98168 (defunct 1960-1976)
- White Center Heights Elementary School (White Center)
- Valley View Elementary 17622 46th Ave S., SeaTac, WA 98188 (defunct 1969-2007)

=== Other facilities ===
- Occupational Skills Center (OSC) 1968-2007: 18010 8th Ave S., Burien 98148
- Puget Sound Skills Center (PSSC) 2007–Present: 18010 8th Ave. S., Burien 98148
- Woodside School 1958-1988 (defunct): 18367 8th Ave. S., Burien 98148
