= Highline High School =

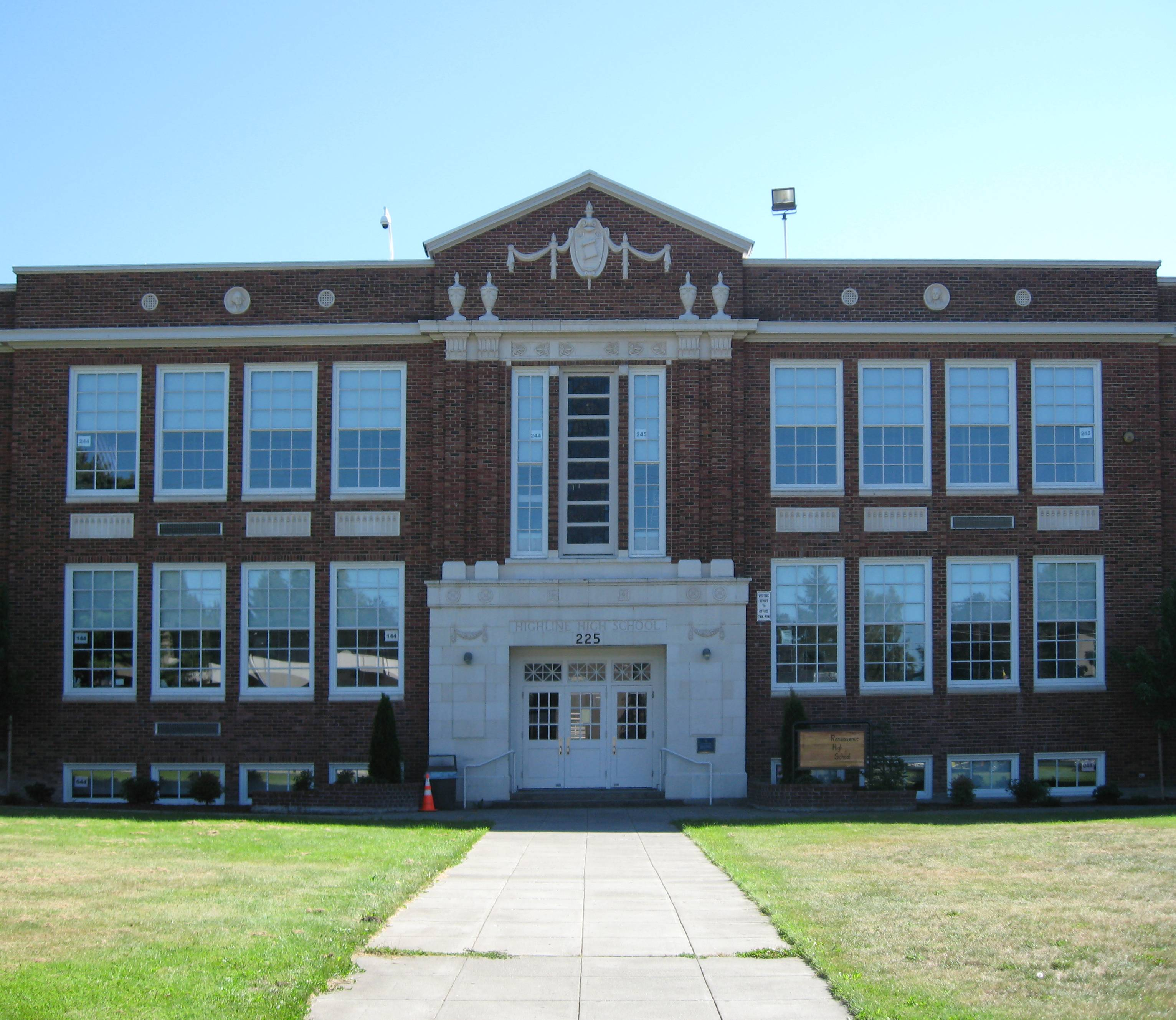

Location
- 225 South 152nd Street (Note: In 2019, construction began to demolish the school buildings and erect new ones. Due to the construction, students attend classes at the district's Olympic Temporary School at 615 S 200th St, Des Moines, Washington 98198, for the 2019–20 and 2020–21 school years. Classes were scheduled to resume on the original campus for the 2021–22 school year.); Burien, Washington 98148; United States; 47°28′00″N 122°19′49″W

Information
- Type: Public high school
- Established: 1924; 102 years ago
- School district: Highline Public Schools
- Principal: Clint Sallee
- Teaching staff: 68.8 (FTE)
- Grades: 9–12
- Gender: Co-educational
- Enrollment: 1,408 (2023–2024)
- Student to teacher ratio: 20.44
- Colors: Purple; Gold
- Athletics conference: Kingco 2A
- Sports: Baseball; basketball; cheer; cross country; dance/drill; football; golf; gymnastics; soccer; softball; swimming & diving; tennis; track & field; volleyball; wrestling
- Mascot: Pirate
- Newspaper: Pirate's Anchor
- Website: hhs.highlineschools.org

Highline High School is a public high school in Burien, Washington, United States, located about 3.5 miles from Seattle–Tacoma International Airport. Highline High School, the flagship high school of the Highline Public Schools district, opened in 1924 and served the cities of Burien, Des Moines, and an area south of Seattle now known as White Center. Today, those cities all have their own area high schools, but at the time Highline was the only high school in the area.

== History ==
The name Highline, for which the school was named, derives from the original name for Des Moines Memorial Drive, which was called the "High Line Road" for its location along the ridge between Puget Sound and the Miller Creek Valley. Today the name represents the geographic area for Burien, SeaTac, Normandy Park, Des Moines and White Center.

For the 2019–20 and 2020–21 school years, Highline students attended school at the district's Olympic Interim School (615 S 200th St, Des Moines, Washington 98198) while the Highline High School buildings (including the original 1924 structure) were demolished and new buildings were constructed.

Adjacent to the school is the Highline Performing Arts Center, which is used by local community organizations, schools, and dance competition companies.

== Sports ==
Highline participates in the following sports as a member of the KingCo 2A conference: baseball, basketball, cheer, cross country, dance/drill, football, golf, gymnastics, soccer, softball, swimming & diving, tennis, track & field, volleyball, and wrestling.

Highline's sports teams were previously longtime members of the Seamount League and then the South Puget Sound League.

== Notable alumni ==
- Adelle August (class of 1952), actress and Miss Washington USA 1952
- Ingrid Backstrom (class of 1996), freestyle skier
- Ryan Brett (class of 2010), American professional baseball player
- Ray Conner (class of 1973), former vice chairman of Boeing and president and CEO of Boeing Commercial Airplanes
- Nate Daligcon (class of 1992), former professional soccer player
- Mark Driscoll (class of 1989), author and former pastor, Mars Hill Church
- Fred Dyson (class of 1957), former member of the Alaska Senate from Eagle River
- Pete Fewing, soccer coach for Seattle University
- Tyler Geving (class of 1991), assistant coach for the University of Portland Pilots men's basketball team, former head basketball coach at Portland State (2009–17)
- Jack Horsley (class of 1969), swimmer, 1968 Olympic bronze medalist (200 m backstroke)
- Faith Ireland (class of 1960), former justice, Washington State Supreme Court (1999–2005)
- Jim McCune (class of 1969), member of the Washington House of Representatives and Pierce County Council
- Eric Overmyer (class of 1969), playwright, screenwriter, producer
- John Requa (class of 1985), screenwriter, Cats & Dogs, Bad Santa
- Richard B. Sanders (class of 1963), former justice, Washington State Supreme Court
- Dan Satterberg (clasd of 1978), King County Prosecuting Attorney
- Mario Segale (class of 1952), American businessman and real-estate developer
- Mike Starr (class of 1984), bassist for Alice in Chains, Celebrity Rehab with Dr. Drew (Season 3), Sober House (Season 2)
- Ernie Steele (class of 1936), NFL running back
- Shelley Lynn Thornton (class of 1988), known as the "Roe Baby", the child at the center of the Roe v. Wade landmark Supreme Court decision
- Brad Tilden (class of 1979), CEO of Alaska Airlines
- Bob Van Duyne (class of 1970), NFL guard, Baltimore Colts (1974–1980)
