= Highline Botanical Garden =

Community botanical garden in SeaTac, Washington, United States

Highline SeaTac Botanical Garden
- A fountain located in one of the gardens.
- Interactive map of Highline SeaTac Botanical Garden
- Type: Botanical garden
- Location: 13735 24th Avenue South, SeaTac, Washington
- Coordinates: 47°28′48″N 122°18′10″W
- Area: 10.5 acres (4.2 ha)
- Website: highlinegarden.org

Highline SeaTac Botanical Garden is a 10.5-acre (4.2 ha) community botanical garden located at 13735 24th Avenue South, SeaTac, Washington and is open daily without charge.

The garden started as the private plantings by Elda and Ray Behm on a 1-acre (4,000 m^{2}) site. Their property was slated for demolition in the mid-1990s for the Seattle-Tacoma International Airport's proposed third runway. In 1999 an agreement was reached to relocate their existing plantings onto vacant land to form a new botanical garden adjacent to the North SeaTac Community Center.Starting in 2000, about 85 to 90% of the plants were transplanted by some 200 volunteers to form the garden's initial 2 acres (8,100 m^{2}).

The Paradise Garden features a 120-foot (37 m) stream which empties into a 7,000 gallon pond, a rustic log pergola, and an astounding assortment of trees, shrubs and perennials. Peak of blooming season is around Mother's Day, but the Paradise Garden holds interest throughout the year.

In 2003 the King County Iris Society planted a 500-square-foot (46 m^{2}) display bed of bearded iris, which also reaches peak bloom around Mother's Day.

The Seattle Rose Society and Puget Sound Daylily Club both joined the garden in 2004. The 500-square-foot (46 m^{2}) daylily bed features over 100 different cultivars and is an official display garden of the American Hemerocallis Society. A variety of plant combinations and companion plantings are showcased, bisected by a spine of Asian pottery.

The Celebration Rose Garden was designed by Greg Butler, Lori White, Debbie Caton, and Nikki Fields. The rose garden features a large open lawn flanked by dual colonnades of columns donated by Secret Garden Statuary. An axially aligned fountain (also donated by Secret Garden) anchors the central space, surrounded by 8 rustic steel arches funded by the City of SeaTac and built by Klein Art/Fab. The garden is home to over 100 roses and hosts over a dozen weddings annually. All roses are organically maintained.

In the winter and spring of 2006 the City of SeaTac and the State of Washington funded the relocation of the historic Seike Japanese Garden to the Highline Botanical Garden site. The Seike Garden, built in 1961 as a war memorial to a fallen son, was designed by Shintaro Okada of Hiroshima. Over $350,000 was spent relocating the garden's bridges, massive stones, and hand-candled pines. The Seike Garden was re-dedicated in June 2006.

The Sensory Garden, designed by Barker Landscape Architects from a concept by Greg Butler, was added in 2008. This garden is planned to delight all the senses, and contains a rain garden, tunnels of vines, and an exotic array of fragrant, tactile, and textural plantings.

Currently (as of August, 2008) in the design and discussion phase are a Natural Yard Care Garden based on King County's Natural Yard Care program and designed by Doug Rice, and a display bed for the Puget Sound Fuchsia Society. Long term plans include a Children's Garden, a Pea Patch, and more.

== Gallery ==
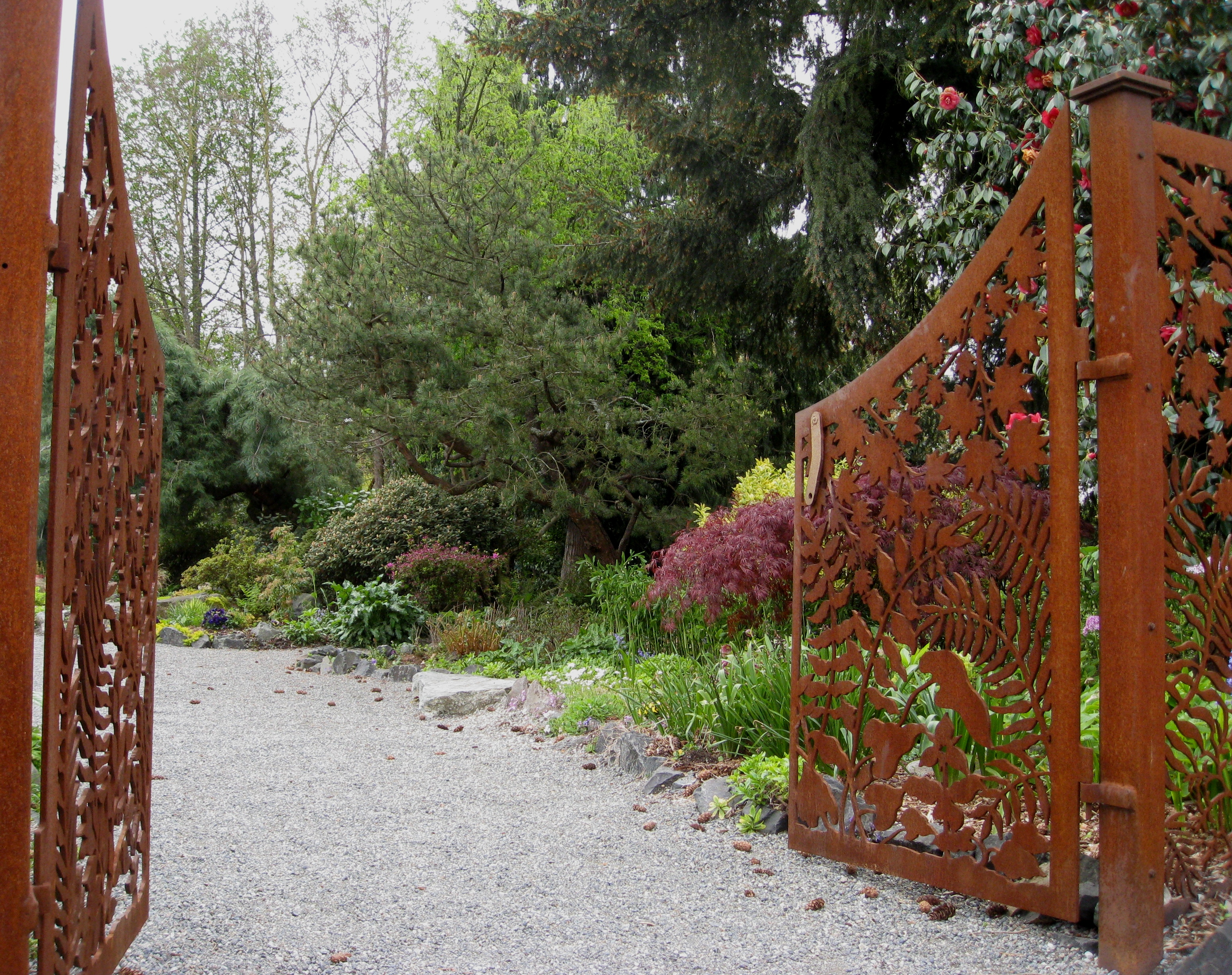

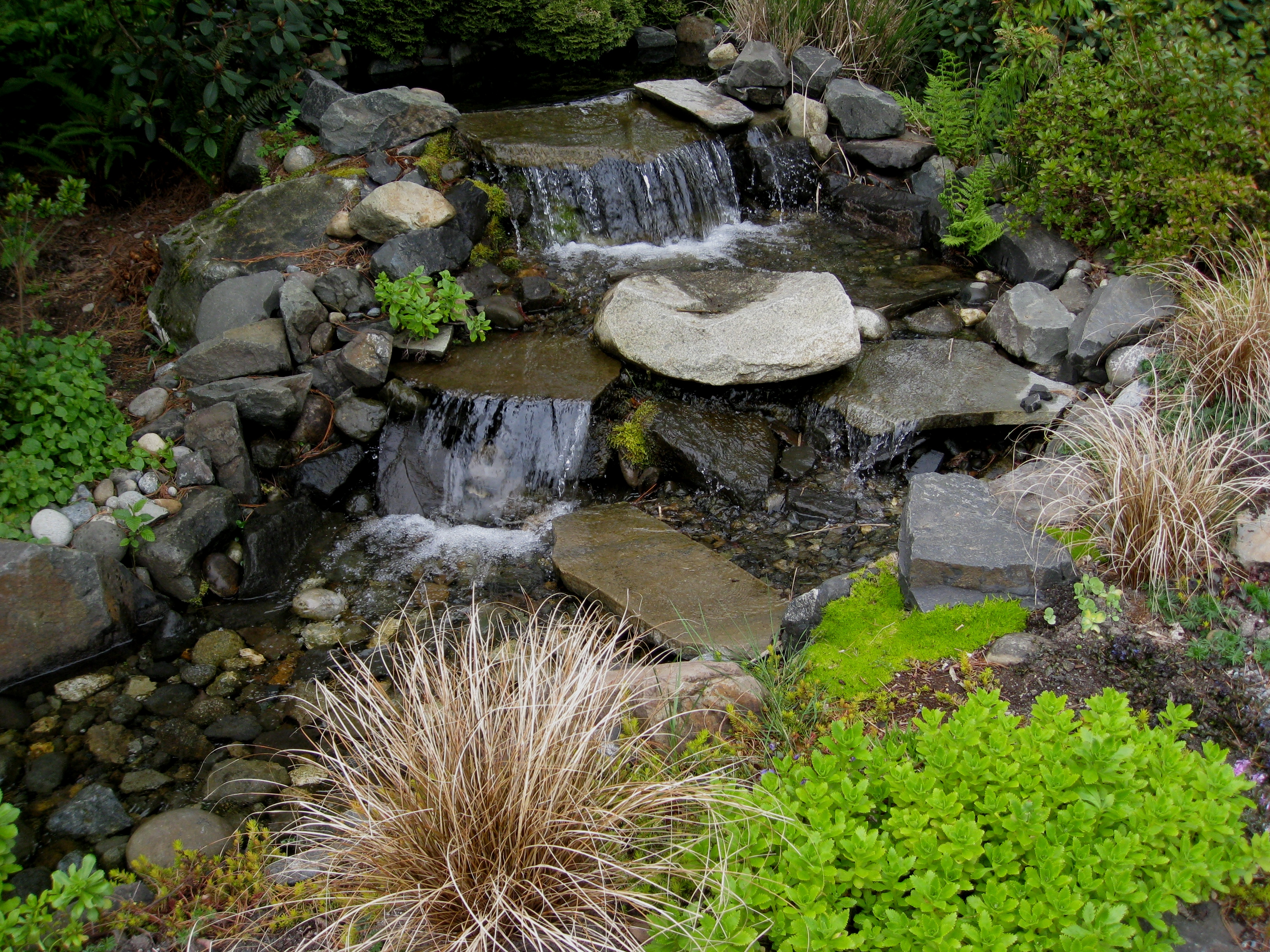

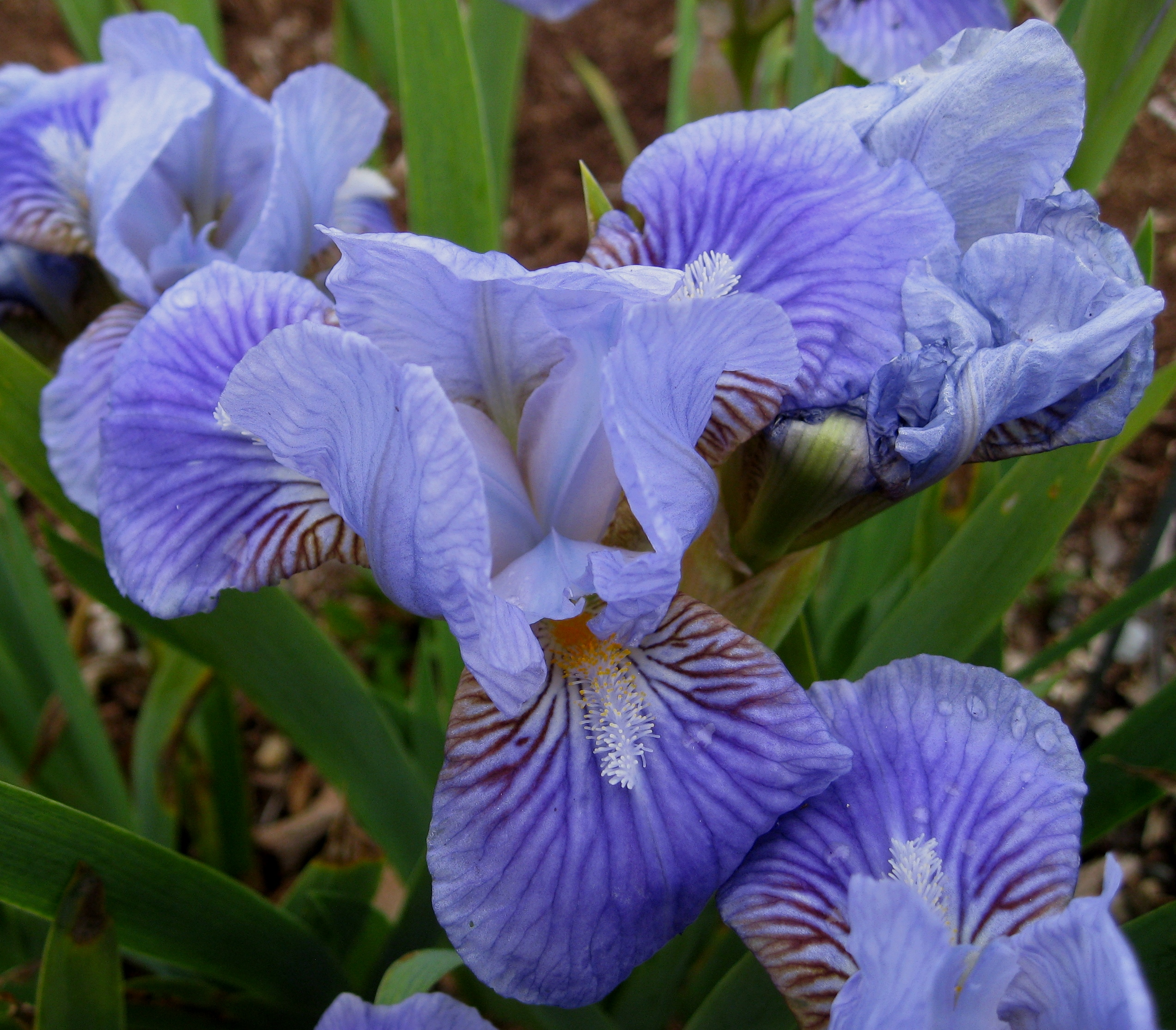

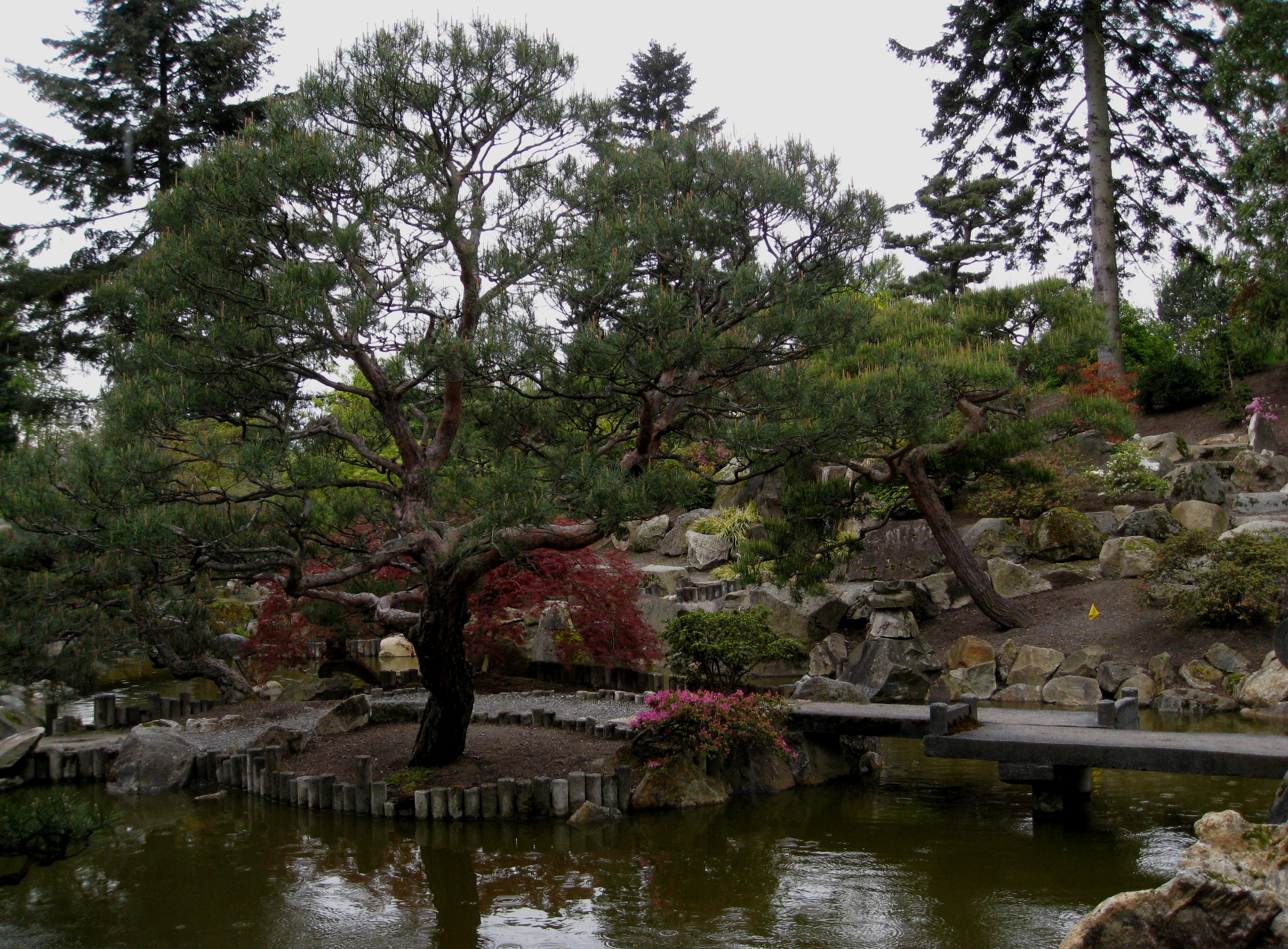

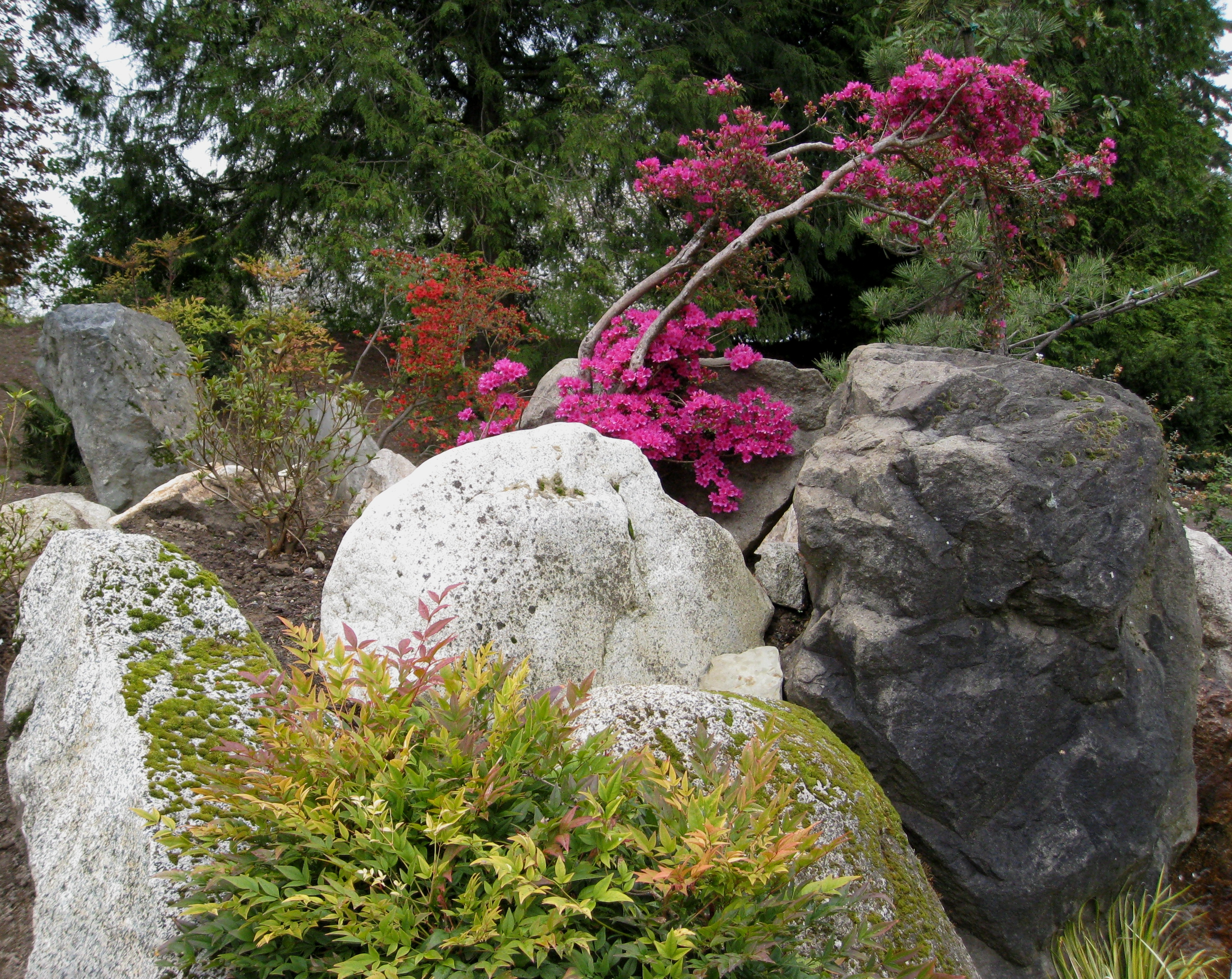

== See also ==
- List of botanical gardens in the United States
