= Rusty Humphries =

American radio personality (born 1965)

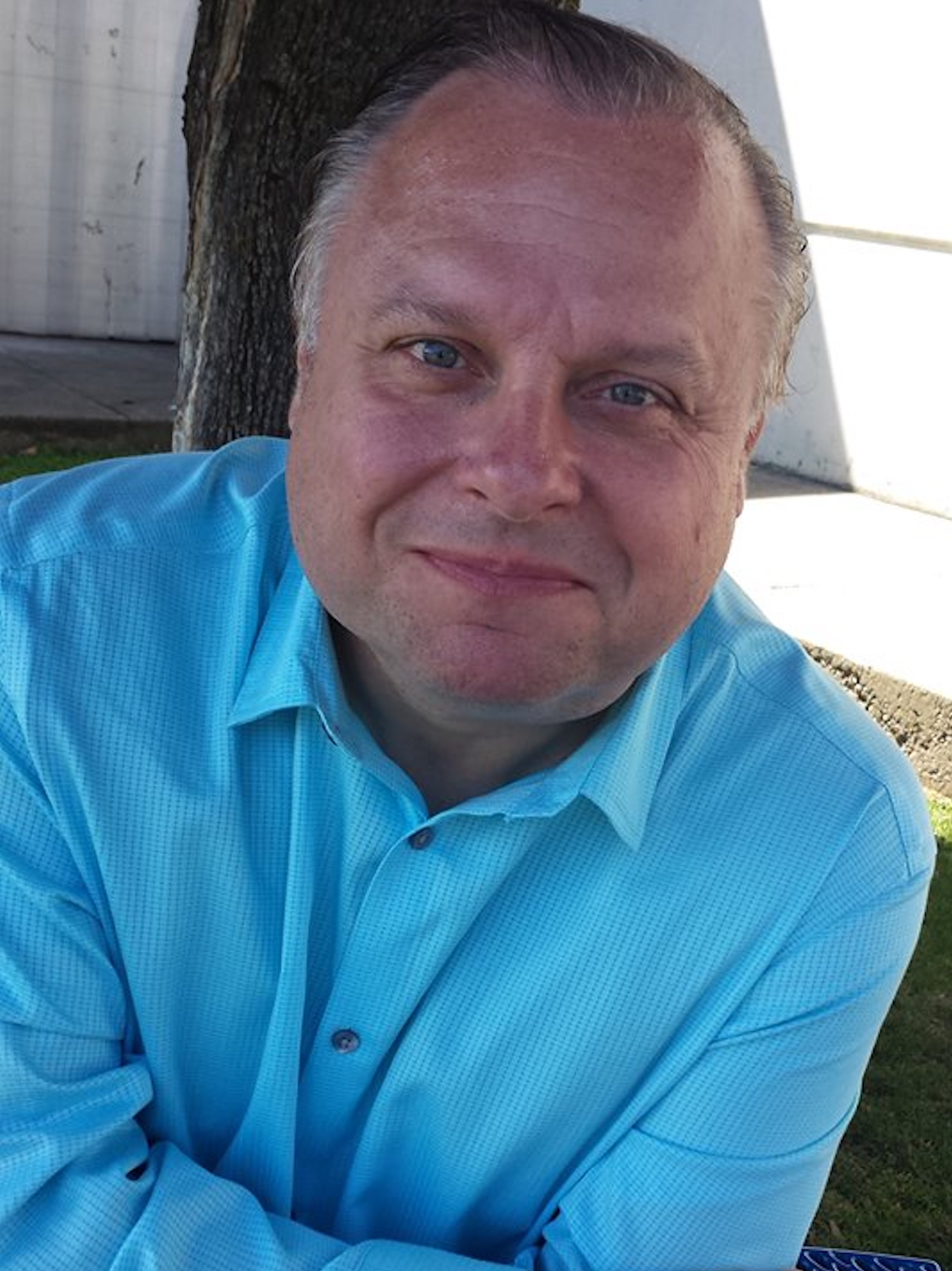
- Humphries in May 2017
- Born: Ralph Edward Humphries; August 29, 1965 (age 60)
- Education: Mount Rainier High School; University of Washington; Harvard University*
- Occupations: Radio personality, actor, author, writer, singer, songwriter
- Years active: 35
- Website: www.rustylive.com

Ralph Edward "Rusty" Humphries (born August 29, 1965) is an American broadcaster, conservative political commentator, award-winning journalist and songwriter. Humphries' former nationally syndicated radio show, The Rusty Humphries Show, aired on over 250 stations with an audience of 1.7 Million listeners per night, ranked as the 6th largest radio talk show in the USA according to Talkers Magazine, from 2000 to 2015.

== Radio career ==
=== Talk shows ===
Humphries has hosted radio shows in New York City, Dallas, San Diego, Atlanta, Fort Wayne, Chicago, Los Angeles, Reno, Seattle, Kansas City and Portland.

Humphries was named one of "America's 100 Most Important Radio Talk Show Hosts" for 17 years in a row, and he was nominated as "Talk Personality Of The Year" by Radio & Records in 2006. Humphries was inducted into the Nevada Broadcasters Hall of Fame as its youngest inductee ever. He was ranked number 14 in the Talkers Magazine "Heavy Hundred" for 2013.

After his two "Rusty Humphries' Salute to the American Veterans" concerts drew a 7,000-person, sold-out crowd on Veterans Day in 1999 and 2000, Humphries was named "Reno's #1 local entertainer."

In addition to his national program, Humphries simultaneously hosted a local show in Atlanta on WGST for 2010 and 2014.

Humphries has produced five musical albums, including Bomb Iraq: Rusty Humphries Takes On the Terrorists, and Greeting from America: Wish You Were Here, a compilation album made for American troops serving in Iraq.

His podcast, We Review Everything, was cohosted by Orson Scott Card.

=== On-air stunt and arrest ===
Humphries, while a personality at KEGL in Dallas, Texas, was arrested, during a live investigative report, after he successfully "smuggled" a toy knife, a toy gun, and toy hand grenades into the DFW Airport as an on-air investigation into security problems on January 15, 1991.

== Personal life ==
Humphries graduated from Mount Rainier High School of Des Moines, Washington, in 1983. Humphries graduated from the University of Washington of Seattle, Washington, in 1987.

Humphries is a singer/songwriter. Rusty has two young daughters, Katelynn and Karaline. Humphries' wife, Ami Kathleen, died on July 17, 2008, after a long battle with interstitial cystitis. Humphries discussed her death when he returned to the air on July 28, 2008.

Humphries' father was killed in the Vietnam War on January 26, 1969.

Humphries helped raise US$1,500,000 as part of Nevada's contribution for the National World War II Memorial in Washington, D.C.

== Partial discography ==
- Bogged Down by Reality (as "Rusty and the Boneheads") (1993)
- Bomb Iraq: Rusty Humphries Takes On the Terrorists (February 2003)
- Greeting From America: Wish You Were Here
- Thank Allah I'm a Jihad Boy (October 2006)
