= Highline Big Picture =

Coordinates: 47°26′13″N 122°19′41″W

Highline Big Picture School
- 440 S 186th Burien, Washington; 98148; United States

Information
- Type: Big Picture School
- Motto: One student at a time
- Established: 2005
- Principal: Frederick Butts
- Enrollment: Current 195
- Colors: Black, Purple, Silver
- Mascot: Big Foot
- Website: bigpicture.highlineschools.org

Highline Big Picture is a small school in the Highline School District in Burien, Washington, that is part of a network of Big Picture schools all over the United States. The high school opened in 2005 with 2009 being the first year with a graduating class. It is a small school with an average teacher-to-student ratio of 1:17.

Highline Big Picture, as part of the Big Picture Network, practices Learning Through Internships or LTI as it is known in the school. For high schoolers on Tuesdays and Thursdays students look for interviews with people in their interest field, this is followed up with shadow day with them. Shadow day within the school is a day in which you follow the people you interview around for a day or two. This is to help the student get an internship at the same place of their choice. Once the student has an internship, they can learn real-world experiences in the field they want to be in. The person that helps them in their internship is called a Mentor. They help them both learn in their field but also can give feedback to the LTI project they do during the rest of the school week. Students are not limited to only one internship or only one job field to pursue. The purpose of LTI and the internships is to help the student learn what they want to do in their lives.

== High school ==
At Highline Big Picture each grade level, 9th through 12th, has its own special name. 9th graders are called 101's, 10th graders, 201's, 11th graders, 301's and 12th graders, 401's. Each grade level has two classes and each class is called an advisory. As each class goes on to the next year, all the students and teachers stay together to keep a class bond with each other.

== Middle school ==
Highline Big Picture also hosts a middle school, which they call themselves Middle Earth. The school offers 6th grade through 8th grades with classes consisting of 20 students and one teacher. The middle school currently has 75 students. The middle school is project-based and students have the opportunity to subsidize classroom instruction with frequent whole-class field trips to various locations throughout the greater Seattle area.
