= Mount Rainier High School =

Location
- 22450 19th Avenue South; Des Moines, Washington 98198; United States
- Coordinates: 47.400125°N 122.307916°W

Information
- Type: Public High School
- Established: 1957
- Status: Active
- School district: Highline Public Schools
- Superintendent: Ivan Duran
- Principal: Kyle Linman
- Staff: About 90
- Teaching staff: 77.12 (FTE)
- Grades: 9-12
- Enrollment: 1,889 (2023–2024)
- Student to teacher ratio: 24.49
- Colors: Columbia Blue, Navy and White
- Athletics conference: Class 4A - NPSL-Cascade Division
- Mascot: Ajax the Ram
- Nickname: Rams
- Newspaper: The Rams Horn
- Yearbook: Tor
- Website: mrhs.highlineschools.org
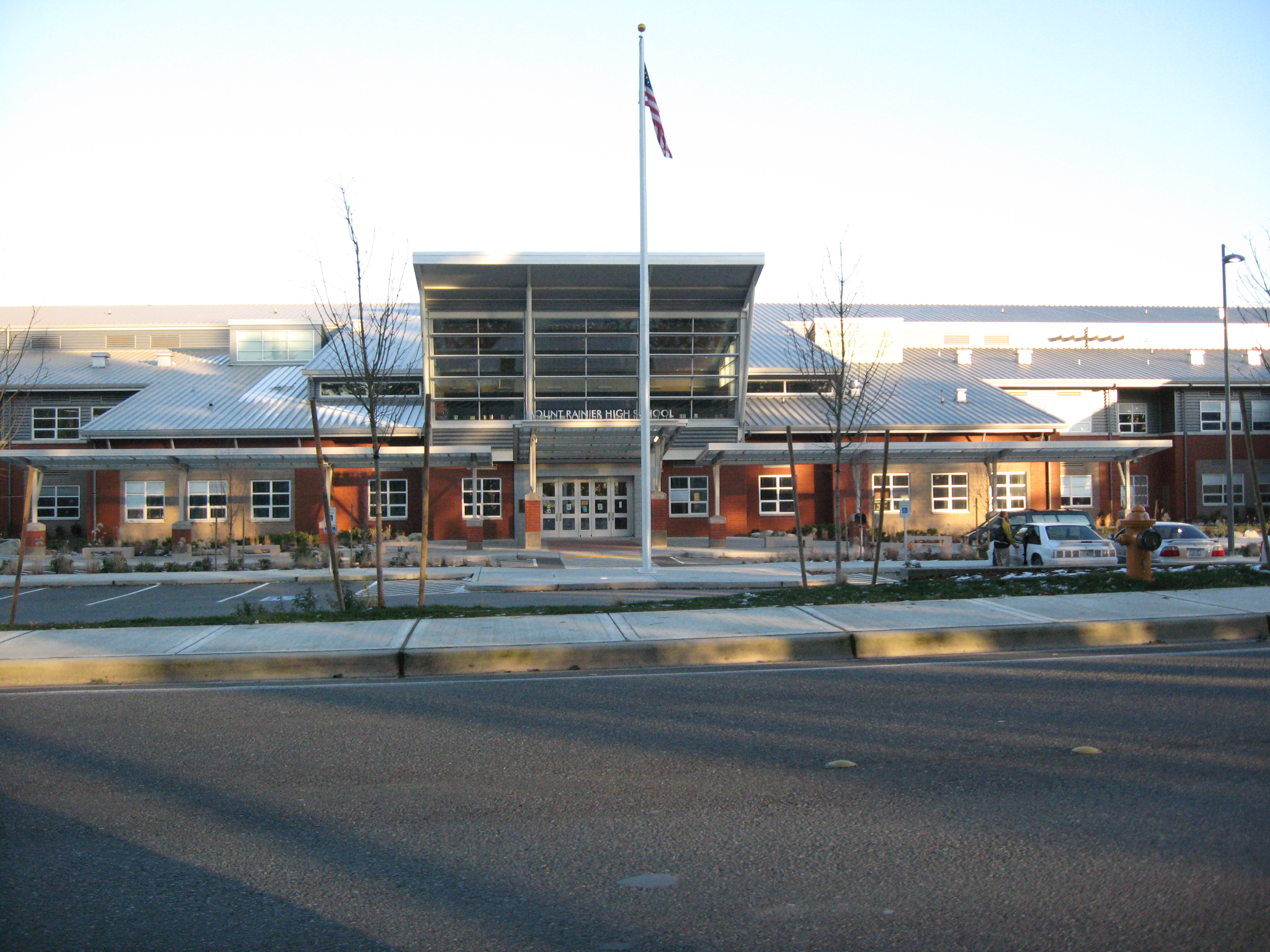
- Mount Rainier's 2007 Facility

Mount Rainier High School is a secondary school in Des Moines, Washington, United States; named for Mount Rainier which can be seen quite well from the school on a clear day. Mount Rainier serves approximately 1700 students and has been active since 1957. It was created to handle the overflow from nearby Highline High School, the district's first high school located in Burien, Washington. The original, aging facility was replaced with a new building at the same location; it opened in September 2007.

== Demographics ==
Mount Rainier is home to a somewhat ethnically diverse population as the school's number of BIPOC exceeds Washington state averages. 49.9% of students currently qualify for free or reduced price lunch.

== Academics ==
Mount Rainier is an IB World School and since July 1987 has offered an International Baccalaureate program. The first IB coordinator at Mount Rainier was Mr. Malcolm Willems. The IB coordinator was Mr. Christopher Wilder for many years afterward but is now Ms. Veronica Fairchild, who previously taught Spanish. Students have the option of testing in all their IB subjects to receive an IB diploma and receive college credit. To do so, a student's combined score must be over 24.

== Athletics ==
Mount Rainier is in the Cascade Division of the North Puget Sound League, since 2016.

Mount Rainier has been recently successful in boys' basketball, boys and girls soccer, girls volleyball, tennis, baseball, drill team, boys wrestling, boys swimming and girls basketball.

The boys' swim team has won 6 state AAA titles since 1991, most recently with three straight from 2003 to 2005. They were runners up in 1992 and 2009. The boys team frequently practices with members of the Swim & Dive team from both John F. Kennedy Catholic High School and Seattle Christian High School.

The former drill team won six 1st place state championship titles, consecutively in 1998, 1999, 2004, 2005, 2010, and 2011.

The boys' soccer team won 3 straight AAA titles from 1987 to 1989 and again in 1991, winning 13 straight games in that stretch. Most recently the team finished second in 2004, and made the state tournament 5 straight years, 2001–05. The 2009 boys soccer team had great success going undefeated to win the Seamount League title and only allowed 2 goals for the entirety of the season and their stretch into the 3A state tournament. The girls' team finished second in 1984 and 1999. The team made the state tournament seven of eight years from 1997 to 2004.

The baseball team made the state AAA tournament seven out of the eight years, from 2002 to 2010.

The softball team finished 4th in the state in 2004.

In addition, its track and field team has excelled in the past, winning eight straight North Puget Sound League boys' championships in the 1970s and a state AAA championship in 1972 under coach Jim Kennett, and led by record-setting high jumper Lee Braach. There have been several recent individual champions in the distance events, notably Ryan Prentice, who went on to Oklahoma State University.

The co-ed tennis team dominated the Seamount League in the 1980s and 1990s, winning 83 straight matches and one state title in boys' tennis. In 1995, Mt. Rainier girls finished first and second in state, with Courtney Perkins defeating Lara Botts in the State Championship. Top tennis player Lynn Johnson graduated in 1992 with a full ride scholarship to play on the offensive line for the Washington Huskies football team.

The boys' basketball team finished third in the state AAA championship in 1971, losing to Pasco in a record quadruple overtime semi-final. The team has regained a measure of success, returning to the AAA state tourney in 1996, 2004, 2006, 2007, and finishing 4th in 2008. In 2012 they competed in the South Puget Sound League (SPSL) and finished 4th place at the AAAA state tournament.

The volleyball team made the state tournament four times from 1997 to 2002.

The football team made the state AAA championship in 1990, losing to Tumwater High School. The program has had very limited success since 2005, and from 2006 to 2008 won fewer than 3 games per season. But when Chris Paulson took over as head coach for the 2008–09 season they made it to the playoffs eventually losing to Eastside Catholic. The 2016 season showed much improvement as the football team finished 7–3, losing to Skyline in the district playoffs and finished in 2nd place in the NPSL. In 2018 the Rams claimed 2nd place in the NPSL Sound division and lost to Kentwood in a League Playoff game. In 2019 the football team earned another District playoff game after defeating Enumclaw in a league play-off and winning the NPSL Sound Division championship.

The wrestling team was dominant in the Seamount League from 2004 to 2010, placing first in the league each of those years.

== New facility ==
Highline Public Schools' "Capital Facilities Improvement Bond" which passed in March 2002 included allocation of funds to rebuild the aging Mount Rainier High School. The old building complex was demolished in the summer of 2005, with new construction appearing in the late fall of 2005. The project was completed in time for the beginning of the 2007–08 school year on September 5, 2007. The Port of Seattle, operators of Seattle-Tacoma International Airport, near the school, the Federal Aviation Administration, and the State of Washington provided funding for noise insulation, generally regarded as a virtual necessity for an efficient learning environment so near to a major airport. During the construction students attended classes at the Highline Public Schools owned Olympic site in the North Hill neighborhood of Des Moines. This arrangement was concluded in June 2007, and the new facility opened with the beginning of the 2007/2008 academic year.

== Notable alumni ==
- Rusty Humphries - Nationally syndicated radio talk show host (1983)
- Scott Peterson - Author, Me Against My Brother; Writer for Christian Science Monitor (1984)
- Brandon Mann - baseball player
- Joe Fain - Washington State Senator (1999)
- Darwin Jones (soccer), American soccer player, Seattle Sounders FC (forward)
- Daryle Skaugstad, Former NFL football player
