= Normandy Park, Washington =

City in Washington, United States

Normandy Park
- City
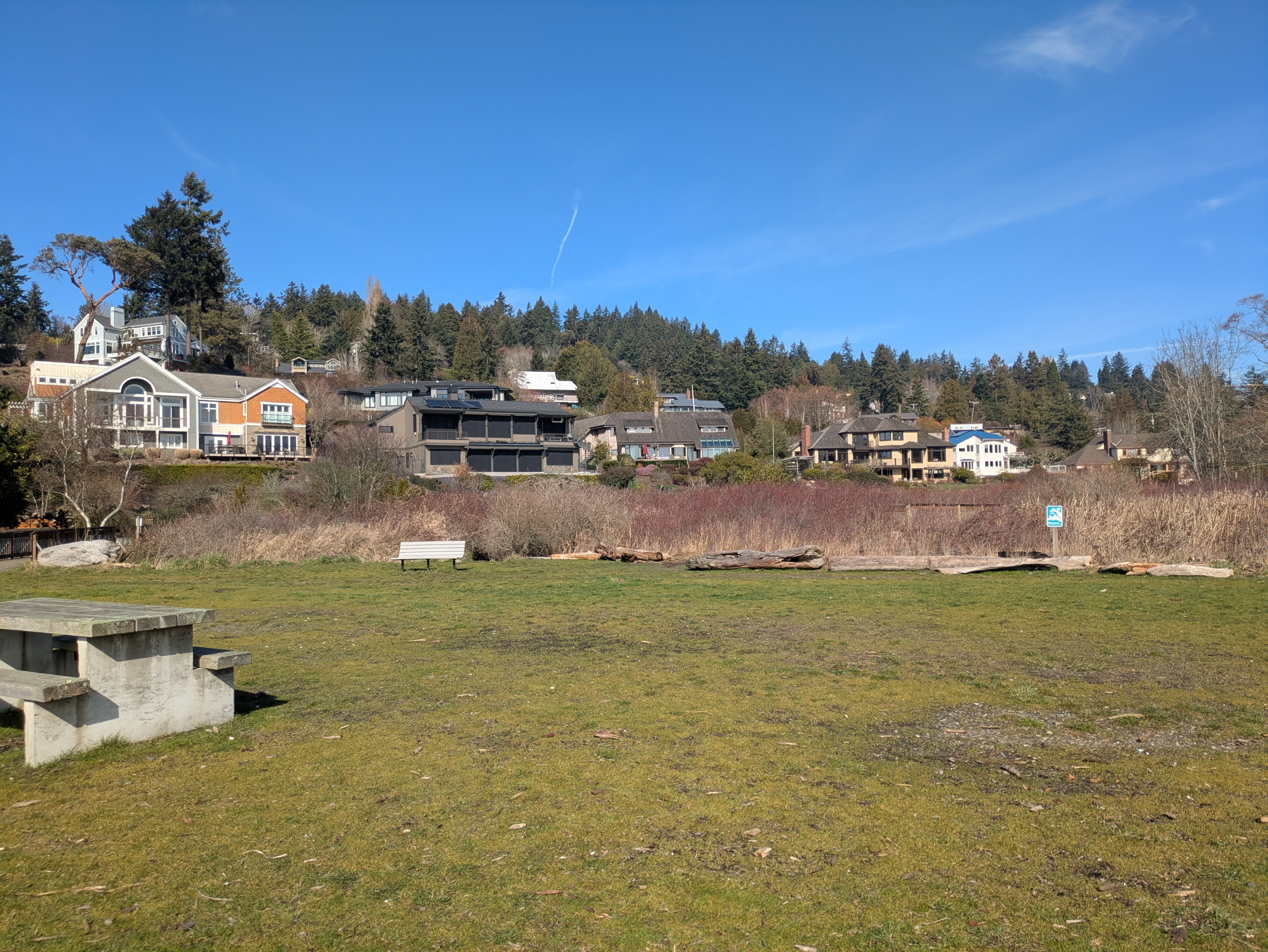
- Houses in Normandy Park near Puget Sound

- Seal

- Location of Normandy Park, Washington
- Coordinates: 47°26′14″N 122°21′36″W
- Country: United States
- State: Washington
- County: King

Government
  - Type: Council–manager
  - Mayor: Eric Zimmerman

Area
  - Total: 3.32 sq mi (8.59 km^{2})
  - Land: 2.50 sq mi (6.47 km^{2})
  - Water: 0.82 sq mi (2.12 km^{2})
- Elevation: 167 ft (51 m)

Population (2020)
  - Total: 6,771
  - Estimate (2021): 6,637
  - Density: 2,643.9/sq mi (1,020.82/km^{2})
- Time zone: UTC-8 (PST)
  - Summer (DST): UTC-7 (PDT)
- ZIP Codes: 98148, 98166, 98198
- Area code(s): 206, 564
- FIPS code: 53-49415
- GNIS feature ID: 2411268
- Website: normandyparkwa.gov

Normandy Park is a city in King County, Washington, United States. The population was 6,771 at the 2020 census.

== History ==
Normandy Park was officially incorporated on June 8, 1953. The city is located in King County and is bordered on the north by the City of Burien and by the City of Des Moines to the south.

== Geography ==
According to the United States Census Bureau, the city has a total area of 6.68 square miles (17.30 km^{2}), of which, 2.52 square miles (6.53 km^{2}) is land and 4.16 square miles (10.77 km^{2}) is water.

== Demographics ==
Historical population
Census	Pop.	Note	%±
1960	3,224		—
1970	4,202		30.3%
1980	4,268		1.6%
1990	6,709		57.2%
2000	6,392		−4.7%
2010	6,335		−0.9%
2020	6,771		6.9%
2021 (est.)	6,637		−2.0%
U.S. Decennial Census; 2020 Census

=== 2020 census ===
As of the 2020 census, Normandy Park had a population of 6,771. The median age was 48.4 years. 19.2% of residents were under the age of 18 and 24.5% of residents were 65 years of age or older. For every 100 females there were 97.3 males, and for every 100 females age 18 and over there were 95.0 males age 18 and over.

100.0% of residents lived in urban areas, while 0.0% lived in rural areas.

There were 2,671 households in Normandy Park, of which 27.9% had children under the age of 18 living in them. Of all households, 61.4% were married-couple households, 13.8% were households with a male householder and no spouse or partner present, and 18.9% were households with a female householder and no spouse or partner present. About 21.5% of all households were made up of individuals and 12.1% had someone living alone who was 65 years of age or older.

There were 2,807 housing units, of which 4.8% were vacant. The homeowner vacancy rate was 1.1% and the rental vacancy rate was 7.1%.

Racial composition as of the 2020 census
Race	Number	Percent
White	5,216	77.0%
Black or African American	136	2.0%
American Indian and Alaska Native	38	0.6%
Asian	426	6.3%
Native Hawaiian and Other Pacific Islander	26	0.4%
Some other race	239	3.5%
Two or more races	690	10.2%
Hispanic or Latino (of any race)	515	7.6%

=== 2010 census ===
As of the 2010 census, there were 6,335 people, 2,620 households, and 1,850 families living in the city. The population density was 2,513.9 inhabitants per square mile (970.6/km^{2}). There were 2,838 housing units at an average density of 1,126.2 per square mile (434.8/km^{2}). The racial makeup of the city was 86.4% White, 0.8% African American, 0.9% Native American, 5.9% Asian, 0.3% Pacific Islander, 1.3% from other races, and 4.4% from two or more races. Hispanic or Latino of any race were 5.2% of the population.

There were 2,620 households, of which 28.4% had children under the age of 18 living with them, 60.3% were married couples living together, 7.3% had a female householder with no husband present, 3.0% had a male householder with no wife present, and 29.4% were non-families. 25.2% of all households were made up of individuals, and 13.3% had someone living alone who was 65 years of age or older. The average household size was 2.42 and the average family size was 2.88.

The median age in the city was 48.7 years. 20.4% of residents were under the age of 18; 5.7% were between the ages of 18 and 24; 17.8% were from 25 to 44; 35% were from 45 to 64; and 21.2% were 65 years of age or older. The gender makeup of the city was 48.8% male and 51.2% female.

=== 2000 census ===
As of the 2000 census, there were 6,392 people, 2,609 households, and 1,933 families living in the city. The population density was 2,597.3 people per square mile (1,003.2/km^{2}). There were 2,670 housing units at an average density of 1,084.9 per square mile (419.1/km^{2}). The racial makeup of the city was 90.21% White, 1.14% African American, 0.39% Native American, 4.60% Asian, 0.23% Pacific Islander, 0.80% from other races, and 2.63% from two or more races. Hispanic or Latino of any race were 2.44% of the population.

There were 2,609 households, out of which 30.1% had children under the age of 18 living with them, 65.5% were married couples living together, 6.3% had a female householder with no husband present, and 25.9% were non-families. 22.0% of all households were made up of individuals, and 11.7% had someone living alone who was 65 years of age or older. The average household size was 2.45 and the average family size was 2.86.

In the city the population was spread out, with 22.2% under the age of 18, 5.0% from 18 to 24, 21.9% from 25 to 44, 30.6% from 45 to 64, and 20.3% who were 65 years of age or older. The median age was 46 years. For every 100 females, there were 92.9 males. For every 100 females age 18 and over, there were 92.2 males.

The median income for a household in the city was $70,367, and the median income for a family was $78,102. Males had a median income of $54,500 versus $40,018 for females. The per capita income for the city was $33,845. About 2.0% of families and 4.0% of the population were below the poverty line, including 4.1% of those under age 18 and 6.1% of those age 65 or over.

== Government and politics ==
Presidential Elections Results
Year	Republican	Democratic	Third Parties
2020	29.50% 1,381	68.00% 3,183	2.50% 117

The city is classified in the Revised Code of Washington as a "second class city" with a "council/manager form of government." The city government consists of seven elected council members, one of whom is selected as mayor by the council themselves and serves as chair of the council.
