= SeaTac, Washington =

City in Washington, United States

- City
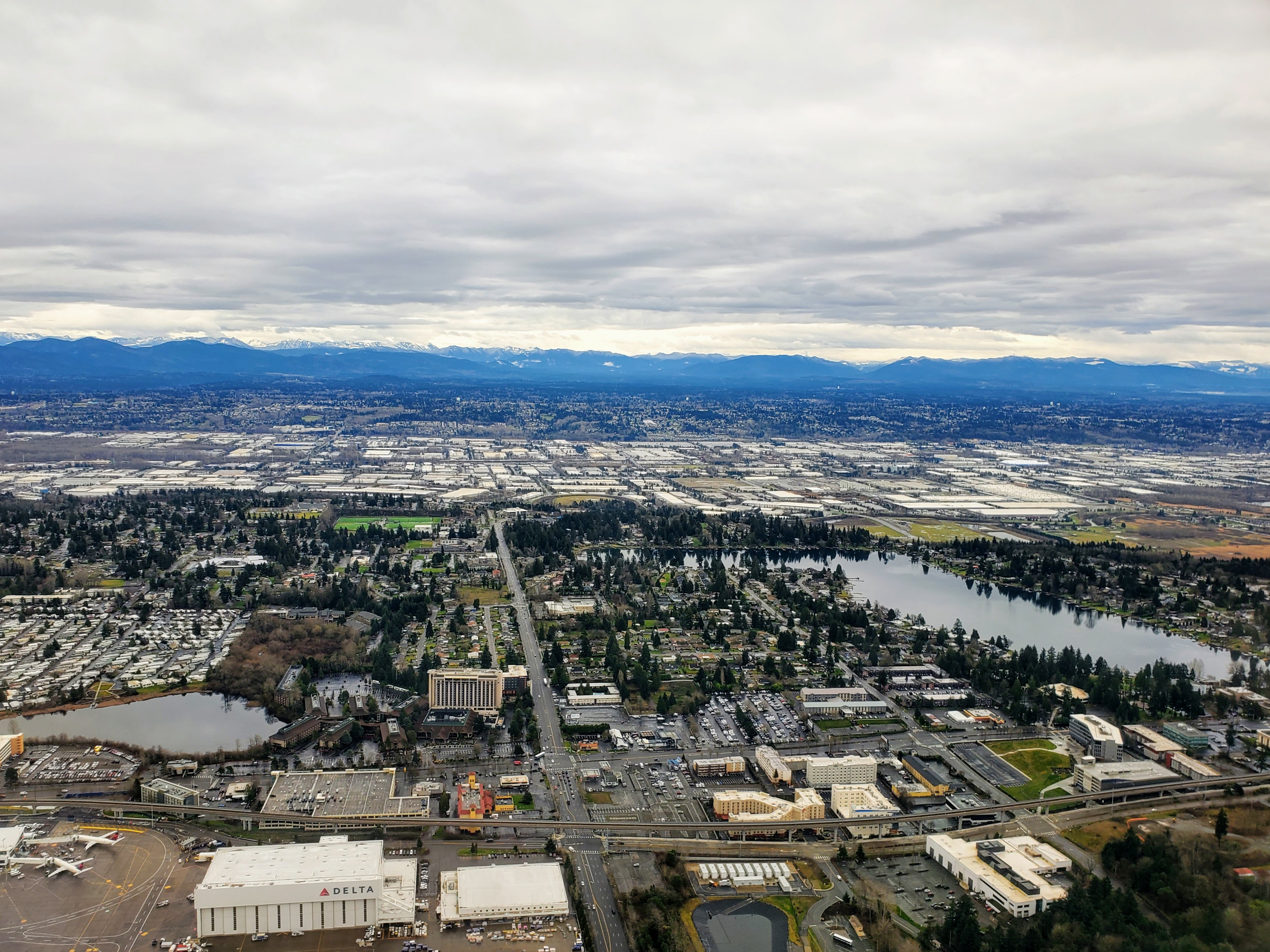
- Aerial view of SeaTac, featuring Angle Lake

- Seal
- Interactive location map of SeaTac
- Coordinates: 47°26′40″N 122°17′55″W
- Country: United States
- State: Washington
- County: King
- Incorporated: February 28, 1990
- Named for: Seattle–Tacoma International Airport

Government
  - Type: Council–manager
  - Mayor: Mohamed Egal
  - Deputy Mayor: Iris Guzmán

Area
  - Total: 10.239 sq mi (26.519 km^{2})
  - Land: 10.064 sq mi (26.066 km^{2})
  - Water: 0.175 sq mi (0.454 km^{2})
- Elevation: 348 ft (106 m)

Population (2020)
  - Total: 31,454
  - Estimate (2024): 34,024
  - Density: 3,200/sq mi (1,220/km^{2})
- Time zone: UTC–8 (Pacific (PST))
  - Summer (DST): UTC–7 (PDT)
- ZIP Codes: 98148, 98158, 98168, 98188, 98198
- Area code(s): 206, 564
- FIPS code: 53-62288
- GNIS feature ID: 2411855
- Website: seatacwa.gov

SeaTac (/ˈsiːtæk/) is a city in southern King County, Washington, United States. The city is an inner-ring suburb of Seattle and part of the Seattle metropolitan area. The name "SeaTac" is derived from Seattle–Tacoma International Airport's nickname "SeaTac," itself a portmanteau of Seattle and Tacoma.

The city of SeaTac is 10 square miles (26 km^{2}) in area and has a population of 31,454 according to the 2020 census. The city boundaries surround the Seattle–Tacoma International Airport (approximately 3 square miles (7.8 km^{2}) in area), which is owned and operated by the Port of Seattle. The city includes the communities of Angle Lake, Bow Lake, McMicken Heights and Riverton Heights, which were established before the city's incorporation. Residents voted for incorporation on March 14, 1989, and the city incorporated in February 1990.

== History ==
The earliest people to live in the Highline ridge and surrounding lowlands were Coast Salish peoples for thousands of years before European contact. The area sits between Puget Sound to the west and the Duwamish and Green River valleys to the east. It was used by Duwamish and Muckleshoot peoples for fishing, hunting, and overland travel. In the 1850s, federal surveyors recorded salal and huckleberry across the area, believed to be evidence of deliberate land management through intentional burning and cultivation, rather than pure wilderness. In 1990, a diver discovered two dugout canoes from the bottom of Angle Lake that were carbon-dated to approximately 1678. Both the Muckleshoot and Duwamish tribes claimed the artifacts, which were eventually transferred to the Muckleshoot Tribe for stewardship.

The Highline area, which includes modern-day SeaTac, Burien, most of Des Moines, and unincorporated communities such as White Center and Boulevard Park, was settled by European Americans in the mid-1850s. Over the following decades, small farming communities developed around Miller Creek and other drainages on the plateau. The federal government finished construction of a military road from Fort Steilacoom to Fort Bellingham in 1860, passing through the Highline area to the east of modern-day SeaTac. One of the more prominent roads of travel from Seattle to Tacoma early in the 20th century is Des Moines Memorial Drive (originally called the High Line road), which passes directly through the middle of the region, particularly through SeaTac and Burien.

The construction of Seattle–Tacoma International Airport transformed the area. After the U.S. military took control of Boeing Field following the attack on Pearl Harbor, the Port of Seattle accepted a federal grant in March 1942 to build a replacement civilian airport as part of a larger wartime pattern of federal intervention in municipal airport development across the country. The airport was dedicated on October 31, 1944, though the U.S. Army Air Forces used it primarily to stage B-29 bombers through the end of World War II.

The communities of Riverton Heights and McMicken Heights tripled in population during the war as workers moved to the area to staff Boeing's plants and the new airport. After the war, as Sea-Tac became the primary commercial aviation gateway for the Puget Sound region, the surrounding unincorporated communities grew further. By 1962, the airport and its tenants employed 6,000 workers with an annual payroll of $40 million and supported an estimated $133 million in regional business activity and 30,000 local residents.

The development of Interstate 5 in the 1960s drew regional through-traffic away from Pacific Highway South, which evolved into a commercial strip of motels, restaurants, and service businesses catering to airport travelers. This concentration of airport-dependent commerce would give the future city of SeaTac an unusually large tax base relative to its residential population.

In response to growing noise complaints in the 1960s and 1970s, the Port Commission joined King County in a comprehensive planning effort that resulted in the Sea-Tac Communities Plan of 1976, the first program in the United States in which an airport operator established a noise buffer by purchasing homes and school buildings adjacent to the facility and soundproofing others. The plan received the American Institute of Planners' Meritorious Program Award in 1978, and 420 acres of vacated land north of the airport were converted into what became North SeaTac Park.

Incorporating the area as a city was proposed by local residents in the 1980s, while a competing proposal sought annexation into Des Moines or another city. Local residents voted for incorporation on March 14, 1989, and the city incorporated on February 28, 1990. Des Moines amended their annexation territory following the decision. The original ballot used the name "Sea-Tac", but the incorporation petition to the county government omitted the hyphen.

== Government and infrastructure ==
=== Local government ===
Presidential Elections Results
Year	Republican	Democratic	Third Parties
2020	28.17% 3,229	69.12% 7,924	2.71% 311
2016	27.38% 2,459	64.35% 5,779	8.27% 743

SeaTac is governed by a city council which consists of seven elected councilpersons. The city "has contracted with the King County Sheriff's Office for law enforcement since incorporation in 1990." Deputies assigned to SeaTac wear city uniforms and drive patrol cars marked with the city logo. There are currently 51 patrol officers, detectives, and support staff assigned full-time to the city.

In January 2014 the SeaTac Fire Department entered a 20-year contract with Kent Fire Department Regional Fire Authority (RFA) to form the Puget Sound Regional Fire Authority. SeaTac's three fire stations, Station 45, 46, and 47, joined Kent's Station 73 to make up RFA's West Battalion.

The Seatac Municipal Court, located in the City Hall, is a court of limited jurisdiction. The judge is authorized by the Revised Code of Washington to preside over civil infractions, traffic infractions, criminal misdemeanor and gross misdemeanor violations, and civil orders for protection.

Public Works is responsible for planning, design, construction and maintenance of streets, transportation improvements, surface water utility, and solid waste and recycling programs.

In 2013, voters in the city narrowly passed a minimum wage of $15 per hour for employees of airport-related businesses, such as hotels, parking lots and car rental agencies. In a later appeals court decision, the $15 minimum wage was reversed for employees working entirely on Port of Seattle property within the city limits but still applies to employees of airport-related businesses in the city proper. Union workshops are exempt from the $15 minimum wage. However, the Washington Supreme Court in August 2015 reversed the King County Superior Court ruling, which said that SeaTac did not have authority to set a minimum wage at the airport. The Supreme Court rejected the argument that the wage did not apply because the airport is owned by the Port of Seattle. The Court stated that Proposition 1 can be enforced at Seattle–Tacoma International Airport because there is no indication that it will interfere with airport operations and that federal labor law does not preempt the provision protecting workers from retaliation.

=== Federal government presence ===
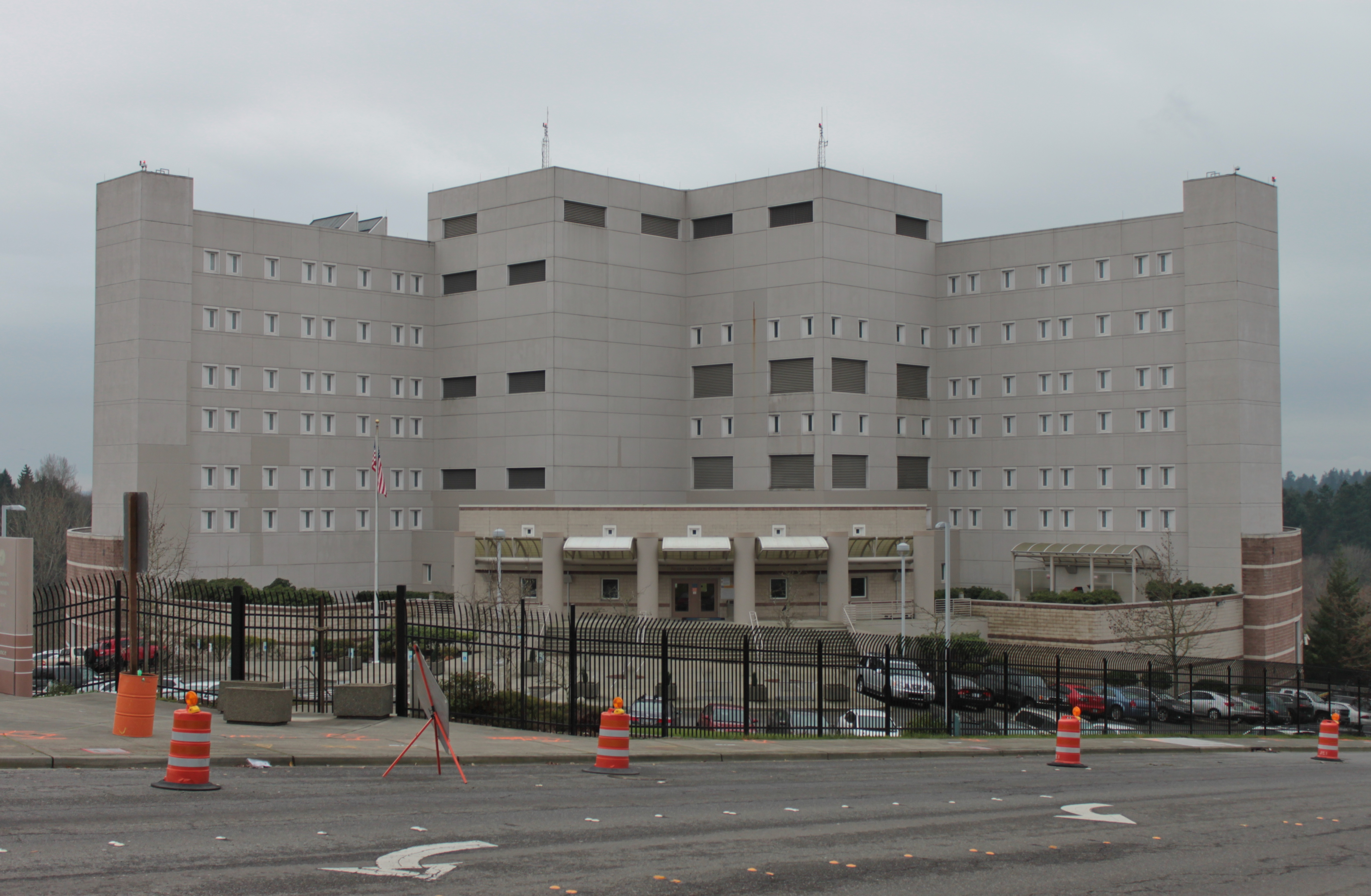
Federal Detention Center, SeaTac

The Riverton Heights Post Office is located in the city.

The National Transportation Safety Board operates the Seattle Aviation Field Office in the city.

The Federal Bureau of Prisons operates the Federal Detention Center, SeaTac in SeaTac.

== Economy ==
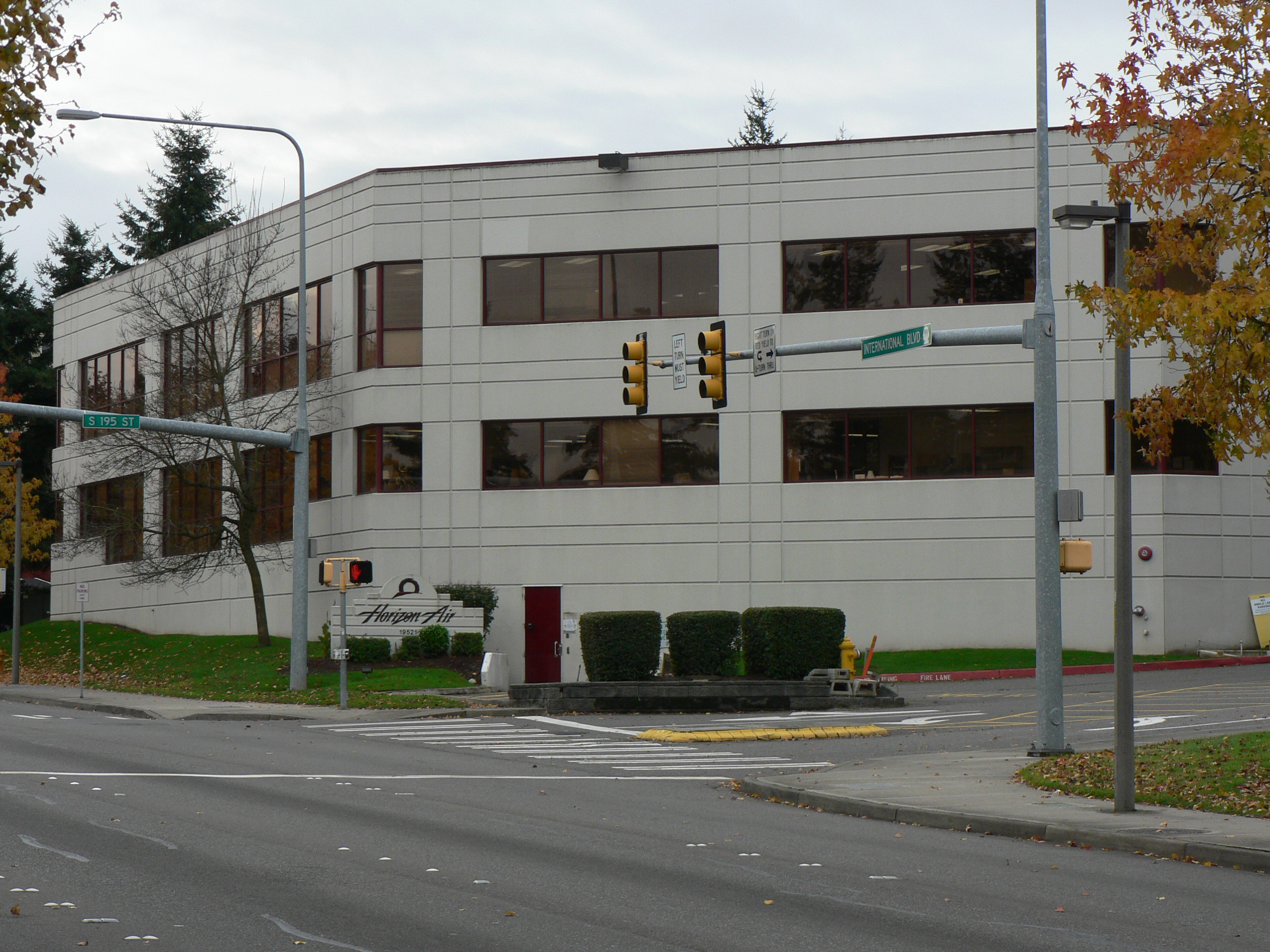
Horizon Air headquarters

The city is home to over 900 licensed businesses, nearly 80 of which are Fortune 1000 companies. They employ nearly 40,000 employees in the city of SeaTac and generate local sales of approximately $3.7 billion.

Alaska Airlines and Horizon Air are headquartered in the city. Four airlines have operations at 18000 Pacific Highway South (also known as 18000 International Boulevard) in the city, including Asiana Airlines, EVA Air, Hainan Airlines, and China Airlines.

=== Economic development ===
SeaTac's Department of Community and Economic Development was formed in early 2011 to create a one-stop permitting center, increase the level of service and assist in the facilitation of economic development by creating a more cohesive approach to real estate development and job creation. The new department has four divisions: Economic Development, Planning, Engineering Review, and Building Services. In 2013, the City of SeaTac Proposition No. 1 passed with 50.64% of the vote to raise the minimum wage to $15 per hour.

== Geography and climate ==
According to the United States Census Bureau, the city has a total area of 10.239 square miles (26.52 km^{2}), of which, 10.064 square miles (26.07 km^{2}) is land and 0.175 square miles (0.45 km^{2}) is water.

Climate data for Seattle (SeaTac Airport), 1991–2020 normals, (Note: Mean monthly maxima and minima (i.e. the highest and lowest temperature readings during an entire month or year) calculated based on data at said location from 1991 to 2020.) extremes 1894–present (Note: Official records are restricted to SeaTac Airport from January 1945 onward.)
Month	Jan	Feb	Mar	Apr	May	Jun	Jul	Aug	Sep	Oct	Nov	Dec	Year
Record high °F (°C)	67 (19)	70 (21)	79 (26)	89 (32)	93 (34)	108 (42)	103 (39)	99 (37)	98 (37)	89 (32)	74 (23)	66 (19)	108 (42)
Mean maximum °F (°C)	57.0 (13.9)	59.1 (15.1)	66.4 (19.1)	74.3 (23.5)	81.9 (27.7)	85.8 (29.9)	91.2 (32.9)	89.9 (32.2)	84.1 (28.9)	72.0 (22.2)	61.6 (16.4)	56.8 (13.8)	94.1 (34.5)
Mean daily maximum °F (°C)	48.0 (8.9)	50.3 (10.2)	54.2 (12.3)	59.3 (15.2)	66.3 (19.1)	71.1 (21.7)	77.4 (25.2)	77.6 (25.3)	71.6 (22.0)	60.5 (15.8)	52.1 (11.2)	47.0 (8.3)	61.3 (16.3)
Daily mean °F (°C)	42.8 (6.0)	44.0 (6.7)	47.1 (8.4)	51.3 (10.7)	57.5 (14.2)	62.0 (16.7)	67.1 (19.5)	67.4 (19.7)	62.6 (17.0)	53.8 (12.1)	46.5 (8.1)	42.0 (5.6)	53.7 (12.1)
Mean daily minimum °F (°C)	37.7 (3.2)	37.7 (3.2)	39.9 (4.4)	43.3 (6.3)	48.7 (9.3)	53.0 (11.7)	56.8 (13.8)	57.2 (14.0)	53.6 (12.0)	47.0 (8.3)	40.9 (4.9)	37.1 (2.8)	46.1 (7.8)
Mean minimum °F (°C)	26.1 (−3.3)	27.3 (−2.6)	31.3 (−0.4)	35.6 (2.0)	40.6 (4.8)	46.6 (8.1)	51.5 (10.8)	51.7 (10.9)	45.8 (7.7)	36.8 (2.7)	29.2 (−1.6)	25.4 (−3.7)	21.5 (−5.8)
Record low °F (°C)	0 (−18)	1 (−17)	11 (−12)	29 (−2)	28 (−2)	38 (3)	43 (6)	44 (7)	35 (2)	28 (−2)	6 (−14)	6 (−14)	0 (−18)
Average precipitation inches (mm)	5.78 (147)	3.76 (96)	4.17 (106)	3.18 (81)	1.88 (48)	1.45 (37)	0.60 (15)	0.97 (25)	1.61 (41)	3.91 (99)	6.31 (160)	5.72 (145)	39.34 (999)
Average snowfall inches (cm)	1.8 (4.6)	2.2 (5.6)	0.4 (1.0)	0.0 (0.0)	0.0 (0.0)	0.0 (0.0)	0.0 (0.0)	0.0 (0.0)	0.0 (0.0)	0.0 (0.0)	0.2 (0.51)	1.7 (4.3)	6.3 (16)
Average precipitation days (≥ 0.01 in)	18.7	15.9	17.1	15.0	11.3	9.2	4.7	4.9	8.3	14.3	18.4	18.4	156.2
Average snowy days (≥ 0.1 in)	1.4	1.2	0.4	0.0	0.0	0.0	0.0	0.0	0.0	0.0	0.2	1.5	4.7
Average relative humidity (%)	78.0	75.2	73.6	71.4	68.9	67.1	65.4	68.2	73.2	78.6	79.8	80.1	73.3
Average dew point °F (°C)	33.1 (0.6)	35.1 (1.7)	36.3 (2.4)	38.8 (3.8)	43.5 (6.4)	48.2 (9.0)	51.4 (10.8)	52.7 (11.5)	50.2 (10.1)	45.1 (7.3)	38.8 (3.8)	34.3 (1.3)	42.3 (5.7)
Mean monthly sunshine hours	69.8	108.8	178.4	207.3	253.7	268.4	312.0	281.4	221.7	142.6	72.7	52.9	2,169.7
Percentage possible sunshine	25	38	48	51	54	56	65	64	59	42	26	20	49
Average ultraviolet index	0.8	1.5	2.8	4.5	6.0	6.9	7.3	6.2	4.4	2.3	1.1	0.7	3.7
Source 1: NOAA (relative humidity, dew point and sun 1961–1990)
Source 2: UV Index Today (1995 to 2022)

== Demographics ==
Historical population
Census	Pop.	Note	%±
1980	17,961		—
1990	22,694		26.4%
2000	25,496		12.3%
2010	26,909		5.5%
2020	31,454		16.9%
2024 (est.)	34,024		8.2%
U.S. Decennial Census; 2020 Census

As of the 2022 American Community Survey, there are 11,414 estimated households in SeaTac with an average of 2.63 persons per household. The city has a median household income of $79,433. Approximately 11.3% of the city's population lives at or below the poverty line. SeaTac has an estimated 71.3% employment rate, with 25.4% of the population holding a bachelor's degree or higher and 84.2% holding a high school diploma.

The top five reported ancestries (people were allowed to report up to two ancestries, thus the figures will generally add to more than 100%) were English (50.1%), Spanish (16.3%), Indo-European (6.0%), Asian and Pacific Islander (11.9%), and Other (15.7%).

=== Racial and ethnic composition ===
SeaTac, Washington – racial and ethnic composition Note: the US Census treats Hispanic/Latino as an ethnic category. This table excludes Latinos from the racial categories and assigns them to a separate category. Hispanics/Latinos may be of any race.
Race / ethnicity (NH = non-Hispanic)	Pop. 2000	Pop. 2010	Pop. 2020	% 2000	% 2010	% 2020
White alone (NH)	14,666	10,619	9,182	57.52%	39.46%	29.19%
Black or African American alone (NH)	2,266	4,455	7,519	8.89%	16.56%	23.90%
Native American or Alaska Native alone (NH)	346	299	230	1.36%	1.11%	0.73%
Asian alone (NH)	2,804	3,874	5,741	11.00%	14.40%	18.25%
Pacific Islander alone (NH)	664	946	972	2.60%	3.52%	3.09%
Other race alone (NH)	77	62	146	0.30%	0.23%	0.46%
Mixed race or multiracial (NH)	1,371	1,180	1,561	5.38%	4.39%	4.96%
Hispanic or Latino (any race)	3,302	5,474	6,103	12.95%	20.34%	19.40%
Total	25,496	26,909	31,454	100.00%	100.00%	100.00%

=== 2020 census ===
As of the 2020 census, SeaTac had a population of 31,454 and a median age of 36.9 years. 21.3% of residents were under the age of 18 and 12.3% of residents were 65 years of age or older; for every 100 females there were 110.5 males, and for every 100 females age 18 and over there were 112.5 males age 18 and over.

All residents lived in urban areas, while 0.0% lived in rural areas.

There were 11,093 households in SeaTac, of which 31.6% had children under the age of 18 living in them. Of all households, 38.4% were married-couple households, 27.3% were households with a male householder and no spouse or partner present, and 26.7% were households with a female householder and no spouse or partner present. About 29.7% of all households were made up of individuals and 8.8% had someone living alone who was 65 years of age or older.

There were 11,774 housing units, of which 5.8% were vacant. The homeowner vacancy rate was 0.9% and the rental vacancy rate was 4.7%.

Racial composition as of the 2020 census
Race	Number	Percent
White	10,005	31.8%
Black or African American	7,588	24.1%
American Indian and Alaska Native	447	1.4%
Asian	5,783	18.4%
Native Hawaiian and Other Pacific Islander	990	3.1%
Some other race	3,767	12.0%
Two or more races	2,874	9.1%
Hispanic or Latino (of any race)	6,103	19.4%

=== 2010 census ===
As of the 2010 census, there were 26,909 people, 9,533 households, and 5,913 families residing in the city. The population density was 2,682.9 inhabitants per square mile (1,035.9/km^{2}). There were 10,360 housing units at an average density of 1,032.9 per square mile (398.8/km^{2}). The racial makeup of the city was 45.94% White, 16.84% African American, 1.48% Native American, 14.53% Asian, 3.56% Pacific Islander, 11.64% from some other races and 6.01% from two or more races. Hispanic or Latino people of any race were 20.34% of the population.

There were 9,533 households, of which 33.2% had children under the age of 18 living with them, 40.6% were married couples living together, 14.0% had a female householder with no husband present, 7.4% had a male householder with no wife present, and 38.0% were non-families. 28.8% of all households were made up of individuals, and 7.5% had someone living alone who was 65 years of age or older. The average household size was 2.72 and the average family size was 3.38.

The median age in the city was 34.5 years. 23.1% of residents were under the age of 18; 10.3% were between the ages of 18 and 24; 31.8% were from 25 to 44; 25.2% were from 45 to 64; and 9.7% were 65 years of age or older. The gender makeup of the city was 52.4% male and 47.6% female.

=== 2000 census ===
As of the 2000 census, there were 25,496 people, 9,708 households, and 5,960 families residing in the city. The population density was 2,558.8 inhabitants per square mile (988.0/km^{2}). There were 10,176 housing units at an average density of 1,021.3 per square mile (394.3/km^{2}). The racial makeup of the city was 62.86% White, 9.15% African American, 1.50% Native American, 11.07% Asian, 2.66% Pacific Islander, 6.41% from some other races and 6.35% from two or more races. Hispanic or Latino people of any race were 12.95% of the population.

There were 9,708 households out of which 30.7% had children under the age of 18 living with them, 42.8% were married couples living together, 12.4% had a female householder with no husband present, and 38.6% were non-families. 30.2% of all households were made up of individuals and 6.8% had someone living alone who was 65 years of age or older. The average household size was 2.53 and the average family size was 3.17.

In the city the population was spread out with 24.4% under the age of 18, 10.2% from 18 to 24, 34.5% from 25 to 44, 21.2% from 45 to 64, and 9.7% who were 65 years of age or older. The median age was 34 years. For every 100 females there were 110.7 males. For every 100 females age 18 and over, there were 111.8 males.

The median income for a household in the city was $41,202, and the median income for a family was $47,630. Males had a median income of $34,396 versus $28,984 for females. The per capita income for the city was $19,717. About 9.8% of families and 11.5% of the population were below the poverty line, including 15.5% of those under age 18 and 8.1% of those age 65 or over.

The most commonly spoken foreign languages in SeaTac are, in order, Spanish, Somali, and Punjabi.

SeaTac's population has grown steadily since the 2000 Census, and is projected to grow 5.06% by 2022, a rate higher than the US rate of 3.77%, but lower than King County's 7.46%. SeaTac has considerable ethnic diversity. Only 51.76% of the age 5+ population reportedly spoke only English at home; some 13.90% spoke Spanish at home, considerably higher than King County's 6.82%, but only somewhat higher than the US's overall 13.16%. Languages spoken at home also include those from Asia-Pacific at 10.74%, Indo-European languages at 10.06%, and other languages at 13.54%.

== Education ==
=== Primary and secondary schools ===
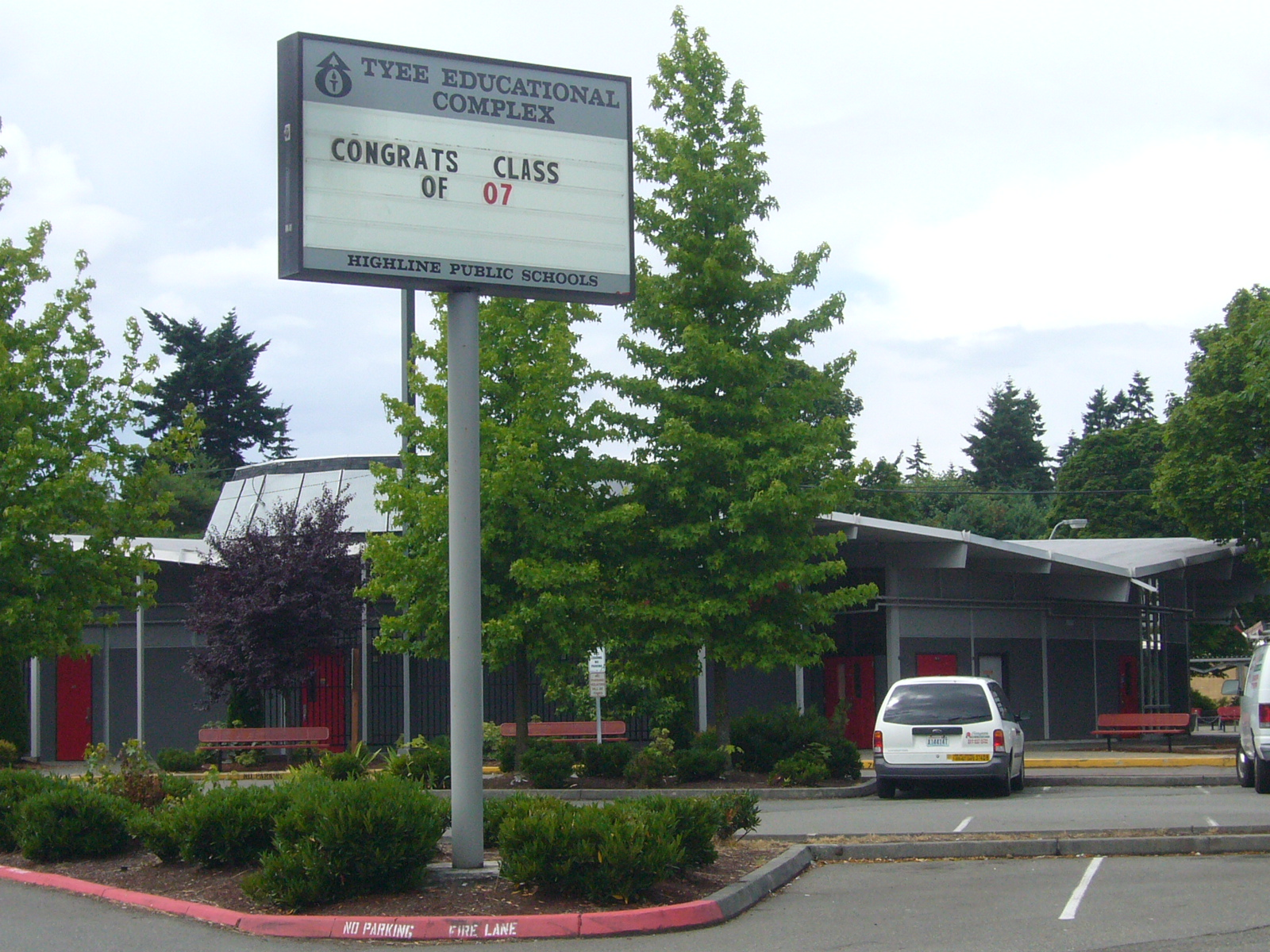
Tyee High School

Highline Public Schools is the school district with the majority of the city in its boundaries. Elementary schools serving the Highline sections of the city include Bow Lake Elementary School in SeaTac, Madrona Elementary School in SeaTac, McMicken Heights Elementary School in SeaTac, and Cedarhurst Elementary School in Burien. Most residents are zoned to Chinook Middle School and Tyee High School in the city, while some are zoned to Sylvester Middle School and Highline High School in Burien. With the opening of Glacier Middle School in north SeaTac, residents north of the airport are generally zoned there and subsequently to Highline High School given the proximity of that area to Burien.

Tyee Educational Complex housing three independent schools: The Academy of Citizenship and Empowerment, and Odyssey: The Essential School. It then has been transformed back to Tyee High School - a single school in the 2017–18 school year.

In 2004, Highline Public Schools reorganized some of its high schools, including Tyee, into having smaller programs on larger campuses.

Small portions of SeaTac are in the Kent School District and the Renton School District.

=== Public libraries ===
The King County Library System operates the Valley View Library in SeaTac.

== Parks and recreation ==
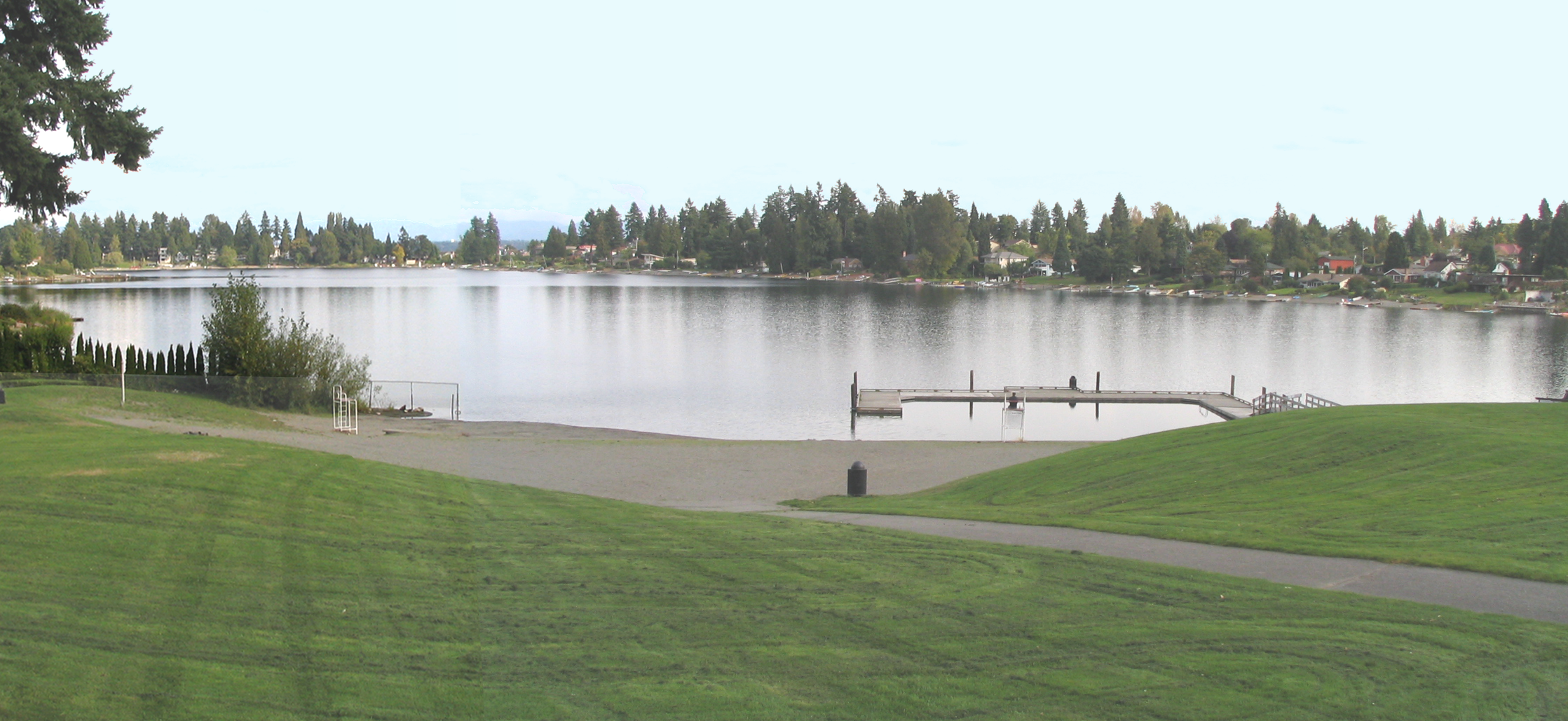
Angle Lake

The city operates seven city parks and operates two community center facilities.

Angle Lake Park, a 10.5-acre (42,000 m^{2}) park at Angle Lake, has a barbecue area, a boat launch, a fishing pier, playground equipment, an open recreation area, swimming facilities, a stage, toilet facilities, and a spray park. In the swimming area lifeguards are on duty during the summer months.

Bow Lake Park, a 4-acre (16,000 m^{2}) park, consists of open space.

Des Moines Creek Trail Park, consisting of 96 acres (390,000 m^{2}), has a paved trail for bicyclists and pedestrians; off-street parking spaces are located at the trail head.

The 37-acre (150,000 m^{2}) Grandview Park, an off leash dog area, has open areas, benches, fencing, a kiosk, waste receptacles, "sani-cans," and trails.

The 2.5-acre (10,000 m^{2}) McMicken Heights Park has an open area, playground equipment, and tennis courts.

The Neighborhood Park at SeaTac Community Center has a half court basketball court a skate park, playground equipment, a picnic area, a climbing boulder, and parking.

The 165-acre (0.67 km^{2}) North SeaTac Park has the SeaTac Community Center, baseball, soccer (football), and softball fields, a disk golf course, an outdoor basketball court, an open area, playground equipment, a picnic shelter, toilet facilities, BMX track and paved walking trails.

The 18-acre (73,000 m^{2}) Sunset Park has baseball/softball fields, soccer fields, tennis courts, toilet facilities, and paved walking trails.

The 21-acre (85,000 m^{2}) Valley Ridge Park has baseball/softball fields with synthetic turf, outdoor basketball courts, a community center, a hockey court, playground equipment, a skate park, soccer fields with synthetic turf, tennis courts, toilet facilities.

The Tyee Valley Golf Course is an 18-hole golf course and also served as the 1988 and 1989 USA Cross Country Championships running course.

== Transportation ==
SeaTac is served by three major highways: State Route 99 (International Boulevard), State Route 518, and the Airport Expressway. Portions of Interstate 5 and State Route 509 also lie within the city limits.

=== Airports ===
The city is served by the Seattle–Tacoma International Airport, located within city limits.

=== Public transportation ===
The city is also served by several public transportation services: Link light rail stops at two stations in the city, at SeaTac/Airport station and Angle Lake station; King County Metro operates several bus routes in the area, including the RapidRide A Line on International Boulevard and RapidRide F Line on Southcenter Boulevard; some Sound Transit Express regional bus routes terminate or serve the SeaTac area, primarily the airport and other transit hubs.

== Notable people ==
- Mark Driscoll, evangelical pastor
- Mia Gregerson, member of the Washington House of Representatives
- Tally Hall, soccer player
- Julia Patterson, former member of the Washington State Legislature and King County Council
- Adam Smith, member of the U.S. House of Representatives
- Doug Sutherland, former mayor of Tacoma and Washington State Commissioner of Public Lands

== See also ==
- List of municipalities in Washington
- Highline Botanical Garden
- Robert Morris Earthwork
