= Coalition of Essential Schools =

US educational reform organization

The Coalition of Essential Schools is a US organization created to further a type of whole-school reform originally envisioned by founder Ted Sizer in his book, Horace's Compromise. The group began in 1984 with twelve schools and grew to 600 members.

In 2014 it merged with the Forum for Education and operated from headquarters in Portland, Maine. The organization's executive board voted in December 2016 to cease the organization’s operations.
