= French Field (Kent, Washington) =

Multi-purpose stadium

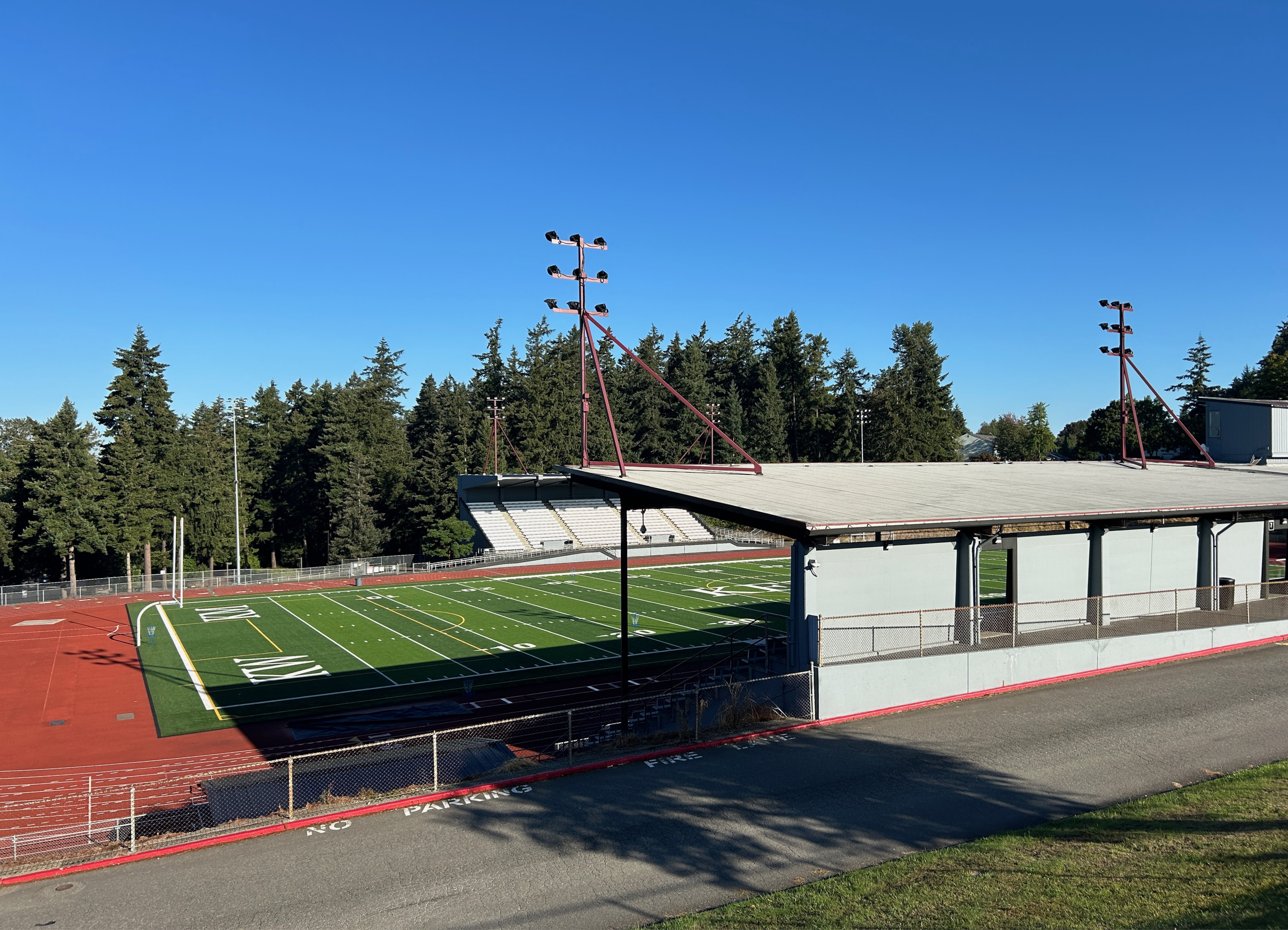

- Location in the United States Location in Washington
- Interactive map of French Field
- Address: 10020 Southeast 256th Street
- Location: Kent, Washington, U.S.
- Coordinates: 47°22′28″N 122°12′34″W
- Owner: Kent School District
- Operator: Kent School District
- Capacity: 6,000
- Surface: FieldTurf

Construction
- Groundbreaking: late 1981
- Opened: 1982; 44 years ago

Tenants
- Kent Meridian High School; Kentlake High School; Kentridge High School; Kentwood High School; King County Jaguars (2002–2010 (suspended operations)); Seattle Majestics (2010–present)

French Field is a multi-purpose stadium in the northwest United States, located in Kent, Washington, a suburb southeast of Seattle. It is a stadium for high school teams in the area including Kent-Meridian High School, Kentlake High School, Kentridge High School, and Kentwood High School football, soccer and track teams.

The stadium is also home for the Seattle Majestics, a professional women's football team in the Women's National Football Conference and was home to the King County Jaguars, a semi-professional football team in the North American Football League.

French Field is also used for community organizations like Kent Youth Soccer Association. The Kent School District uses this field for middle school and elementary school sporting events such as track.

Adjacent to Kent-Meridian High School, it opened 44 years ago in 1982; its running track is open daily to the general public. It is also used for Kent-Meridian's physical education curriculum.

== See also ==
- Kent-Meridian High School
- Kentlake High School
- Kentridge High School
- Kentwood High School
- Kent School District
- King County Jaguars
- City of Kent
