= Kent-Meridian High School =

Public high school in Kent, Washington

Location
- 10020 SE 256th Street; Kent, Washington 98030; United States; 47°22′22″N 122°12′25″W

Information
- Type: Public high school
- Established: 1951; 75 years ago
- School district: Kent School District
- NCES School ID: 530396000621
- Principal: David Radford
- Teaching staff: 89.32 (FTE)
- Grades: 9–12
- Enrollment: 1,706 (2023–2024)
- Student to teacher ratio: 19.10
- Campus type: Urban
- Colors: Red, white, and blue
- Mascot: Royal Lion
- Website: www.kent.k12.wa.us/o/kmhs

Kent-Meridian High School is a public high school located in Kent, Washington, United States. It is one of four high schools in the Kent School District, along with Kentlake High School, Kentridge High School, and Kentwood High School. As of 2024, its principal is David Radford.

== History ==
The school opened in its present form in 1951 when the Kent School District merged with the Panther Lake and Meridian School Districts. This new high school served all three districts. The former Kent High School building became Kent Junior High School.

== Athletics ==
Kent-Meridian is part of the Cascade Division of the North Puget Sound League as of the 2016–17 school year. Kent-Meridian High School's athletic teams are known as the Royals. Teams compete at French Field next to the school.

Kent-Meridian uses a swimming pool built as part of King County Forward Thrust, which is now owned by the city of Kent.

Kent-Meridian won a track state championship in 2011, and finished second in 2009.

=== Taylor Trophy ===
The Taylor Trophy is given to and kept by the winner of the yearly football rivalry between Auburn High School and Kent-Meridian dating back to 1908. Dr. Owen Taylor created the trophy presentation in 1929. Dr. Taylor owned the Kent hospital that was on Second Avenue and Gowe Street and he had a home on Scenic Hill. The rivalry is the second oldest football rivalry in Washington.

== Kent-Meridian Technology Academy ==
Kent-Meridian is home to the Kent-Meridian Technology Academy. The KMTA is an innovative Small Learning Community that is part of Kent-Meridian, characterized by its utilization of project-based learning, STEAM, and 21st Century Skills.

Currently, KMTA offers classes for 9th through 10th grade, with a KMTA 11 program for 11th grade students.

== Notable alumni ==
- Red Badgro – former MLB player, St. Louis Browns
- Karl Best – former MLB player, Seattle Mariners, Minnesota Twins
- John Bronson – NFL football player, Arizona Cardinals
- Morgan Christen – circuit judge of the United States Court of Appeals for the Ninth Circuit, appointed by Barack Obama
- Robin Earl – former football player, Chicago Bears running back
- Jeff Jaeger – former NFL kicker
- Reggie Jones – former NFL cornerback
- PZ Myers – blogger
- Robert L. Phillips – author, entrepreneur and professor
- Dave Reichert – congressman from Washington, former King County sheriff
- Jaleen Roberts – track and field athlete
- Rob Saka – member, Seattle City Council
- John Taylor – reality television star, Too Fat for 15: Fighting Back
- Kyle Townsend – Grammy and Academy nominee, record producer
