= Fairwood, King County, Washington =

Fairwood, Washington
- Census-designated place
- Location of Fairwood, Washington
- Coordinates: 47°26′49″N 122°07′57″W
- Country: United States
- State: Washington
- County: King

Area
  - Total: 4.86 sq mi (12.60 km^{2})
  - Land: 4.86 sq mi (12.60 km^{2})
  - Water: 0 sq mi (0.0 km^{2})
- Elevation: 495 ft (151 m)

Population (2020)
  - Total: 19,396
  - Density: 3,987/sq mi (1,539/km^{2})
- Time zone: UTC-8 (Pacific (PST))
  - Summer (DST): UTC-7 (PDT)
- FIPS code: 53-23160
- GNIS feature ID: 2407983

Fairwood is an unincorporated community and census-designated place (CDP) in King County, Washington, United States. As of the 2020 census the population was 19,396.

== Geography ==
Fairwood is located 16 miles (26 km) southeast of downtown Seattle. The Fairwood CDP is bordered to the north and west by the city of Renton and to the east by the Maple Heights-Lake Desire CDP, which shares a ZIP Code (Renton's 98058) with Fairwood. Population and demographic statistics in this article are only for the Fairwood CDP, not the larger mailing area.

According to the United States Census Bureau, the CDP has a total area of 4.9 square miles (12.6 km^{2}).

The Fairwood area occupies a plateau which extends from the bluffs of the Cedar River valley on the north down toward State Route 167 and the Kent Valley on the west.

== Parks and recreation ==
The following parks and recreation areas are within the Fairwood CDP:

- Fairwood Golf & Country Club – A large 18-hole golf course located in the Fairwood Greens neighborhood. It features 6,316 yards of golf from the longest tees for a par of 71. The country club includes a heated 8-lane junior Olympic sized pool, and fitness gym.
- Petrovitsky Park – Located just north of Petrovitsky Rd, an 88-acre park with 4 baseball fields and soccer fields, a playground, and picnic areas.

Other areas outside the CDP but still considered within the Fairwood area are:

- Spring Lake / Lake Desire Park – Located in eastern Fairwood between Lake Desire and Spring Lake. It features an 11-mile backcountry trail for hiking, horseback riding and mountain biking.
- Soos Creek Trail and Park – In western Fairwood, home to a large riparian habitat great for birdwatching of ducks, song birds, and raptors. The 12 mile long Soos Creek trail was extended up to Fairwood in the late 2000s.
- McGarvey Park – Features a 1.2 mile hiking trail up Cedar Mountain (Echo Mountain) through evergreen forest, passing over Peterson Creek. It has views of Mount Rainier on the summit of Cedar Mountain.
- Cedar River Trail – North of the Fairwood plateau the trail hugs the winding Cedar River from Renton to Maple Valley.

== Education ==
The Fairwood CDP is served by two school districts, Renton and Kent. The Tahoma School District covers parts of the Fairwood ZIP code area that are within the neighboring Maple Heights-Lake Desire CDP.

Schools serving the Fairwood area are:

=== High schools ===
- Lindbergh High School
- Kentridge High School

=== Middle schools ===
- Nelsen Middle School
- Meeker Middle School
- Northwood Middle School

=== Elementary schools ===
- Renton Park ES
- Carriage Crest ES
- Cascade Elementary
- Fairwood ES
- Glenridge ES
- Lake Youngs ES
- Ridgewood ES
- Springbrook ES
- Shadow Lake Elementary
- Benson Hill ES

== Major roads ==
There are three major arterials that run through Fairwood. Petrovitsky Road runs east/west through Fairwood's commercial core and many of its neighborhoods. It stretches from downtown Renton, near the Boeing Renton Factory, and Boeing Commercial Aviation; where many Fairwood residents work, to Maple Valley, winding through the rural timberland, ranches, and farms of eastern Fairwood. 140th Avenue runs north–south adjacent to the Fairwood shopping centers and Soos Creek. It stretches from Maple Valley highway on the north and leads 9 miles to Green River Community College by way of Kent's east hill. State Route 169 (Maple Valley highway) on the northern end of Fairwood provides short access to Interstate 405.

== Public safety ==
Fairwood fire protection and emergency medical services are provided by Fire Districts 40 and 37. The Fire District 40 station is located on Petrovitsky Road in the center of Fairwood. The King County Sheriff provides policing services to the area.

== Demographics ==
Historical population
Census	Pop.	Note	%±
2010	19,102		—
2020	19,396		1.5%
U.S. Decennial Census; 2000 2010

Fairwood first appeared as a census designated place in the 2010 U.S. census.

=== Racial and ethnic composition ===
Fairwood CDP, Washington – Racial and ethnic composition Note: the US Census treats Hispanic/Latino as an ethnic category. This table excludes Latinos from the racial categories and assigns them to a separate category. Hispanics/Latinos may be of any race.
Race / Ethnicity (NH = Non-Hispanic)	Pop 2010	Pop 2020	% 2010	% 2020
White alone (NH)	11,862	10,088	62.10%	52.01%
Black or African American alone (NH)	1,391	1,513	7.28%	7.80%
Native American or Alaska Native alone (NH)	79	85	0.41%	0.44%
Asian alone (NH)	3,345	4,074	17.51%	21.00%
Native Hawaiian or Pacific Islander alone (NH)	103	160	0.54%	0.82%
Other race alone (NH)	34	162	0.18%	0.84%
Mixed race or Multiracial (NH)	1,048	1,557	5.49%	8.03%
Hispanic or Latino (any race)	1,240	1,757	6.49%	9.06%
Total	19,102	19,396	100.00%	100.00%

=== 2020 Census ===
As of the 2020 census, there were 19,396 people, 6,970 households, and a total of 7,338 housing units. The racial makeup of the CDP was; There were 136 who were American Indian/Alaska Native, 4,106 who were Asian, 1,559 who were Black/African American, 163 who were Native Hawaiian/Other Pacific Islander, 10,437 (10,088 alone) who were White, 731 who were of some other race, and 2,264 of two or more races. The Hispanic/Latino population was 1,757 of any race.

=== 2010 Census ===
As of the census of 2010, there were 19,102 people, 7,101 households, and 5,235 families residing in the CDP. The population density was 3,927 people per square mile (1,516.4/km^{2}). There were 7,367 housing units, of which 266, or 3.6%, were vacant. The racial makeup of the CDP was 65.3% White, 7.4% African American, 0.5% Native American, 17.6% Asian, 0.6% Pacific Islander, 2.4% some other race, and 6.3% from two or more races. Hispanic or Latino of any race were 6.5% of the population.

Of the 7,101 households, 37.0% had children under the age of 18 living with them, 58.5% were headed by married couples living together, 10.8% had a female householder with no husband present, and 26.3% were non-families. 19.8% of all households were made up of individuals, and 4.7% were someone living alone who was 65 years of age or older. The average household size was 2.68, and the average family size was 3.10.

In the CDP, 24.6% of the population were under the age of 18, 7.6% were from 18 to 24, 28.0% were from 25 to 44, 29.6% were from 45 to 64, and 10.3% were 65 years of age or older. The median age was 38.3 years. For every 100 females there were 97.5 males. For every 100 females age 18 and over, there were 94.1 males.

For the period 2013–17, the estimated median annual income for a household in the CDP was $93,810, and the median income for a family was $102,333. Male full-time workers had a median income of $67,019 versus $49,907 for females. The per capita income for the CDP was $41,134. About 3.5% of families and 4.8% of the total population were below the poverty line, including 9.4% of those under age 18 and 2.3% of those age 65 or over.

== Economy ==
Residents are employed at a slightly higher rate than the rest of the county and the median income is $85,000 (versus $69,000 for King County). More than half of the workers in the Fairwood area work in south King County with less than a 30-minute commute. A significant number of Fairwood workers are in professional, management and sales jobs (70%).

== Politics ==
On the national level, Cascade-Fairwood leans towards candidates of the Democratic Party. Democrat John Kerry received about 56 percent of the vote in 2004 to Republican George W. Bush's 43 percent. Despite this, there are a number of pockets where the Republican Party often wins marginal majorities.

The Cascade area (approximately a population of 17,000), which included much of unincorporated Benson Hill north of SE 200 Street and west of 128th Avenue SE, voted to be annexed by the city of Renton in 2007, effective March 1, 2008. The remaining unincorporated area of King County, which is primarily the Fairwood community, has the option of annexing to the city of Renton or incorporating as a city.

In February 2005, the Fairwood Task Force filed a Notice of Intent to Incorporation with King County, to establish a new City of Fairwood. This attempt to incorporate was narrowly defeated in the election held on September 19, 2006. In that election, 48.22% of the votes were for incorporation; a swing of only 136 votes in the election would have changed the result.

The process to form a City of Fairwood was restarted by the Fairwood Municipal Initiative when it filed another Notice of Proposed Incorporation with King County, Washington on April 16, 2007. As of October 2008, the incorporation effort is now under the jurisdiction of the King County Boundary Review Board (BRB) and a consulting firm hired by the BRB is conducting an economic feasibility study for the proposed city of Fairwood.

On November 3, 2009, Proposition 1 to incorporate a city of Fairwood failed again, as it did in 2006.

Efforts are also ongoing to annex the Fairwood area into the city of Renton. Additionally, the Red Mill area of the Fairwood PAA is presently undertaking a separate petition-method annexation.

On November 2, 2010, 57.6% of voters voted against a proposition to annex Fairwood to Renton.
