= Seamount League =

The Seamount Athletic League was an interscholastic high school league in Western Washington.

== History ==
The Seamount League was founded in June 1991. It merged with the Pierce County League in June 2001.

In the late 2000s, the league had one of the highest ejection rates of any league in the state of Washington.

In 2016 the members of the Seamount League were part of a major restructuring, which brought into existence the new North Puget Sound League and changes to the South Puget Sound League, and caused the Seamount League to fold.

== Leadership ==
The league was led by three organizations: the Superintendents' Association, the Principals' Association, and the Activities / Athletics Directors' Association. The Superintendents' Association determined the overall direction of the league.

== Member schools ==
Participating school districts included the Highline School District (Evergreen High School, Highline High School, and Tyee High School), the Renton School District (Hazen High School, Lindbergh High School, and Renton High School), and the Tukwila School District (Foster High School).

At one point, Mount Rainier High School, Peninsula High School (Washington), Tahoma High School, John F. Kennedy Catholic High School, Liberty High School (Issaquah, Washington), Enumclaw High School, and Mount Si High School were Seamount League members.

New members could have been admitted by a vote of league principals and the superintendents of districts in which member schools are located.
