= Spring Lake Park =

Spring Lake Park is the name of some places in the United States of America:

- Spring Lake Park, Minnesota, a city
- Spring Lake Park (Illinois), a public park in Macomb, Illinois
- Spring Lake (Omaha, Nebraska), a public park in South Omaha, Nebraska
- Spring Lake Regional Park, a public park in Santa Rosa, California
- Spring Lake Park (Texarkana, Texas)
- Spring Lake (King County, Washington) and Lake Desire, adjacent to Spring Lake/Lake Desire Park
