= Kent Crusaders =

Kent Crusaders may refer to:

- Kent Crusaders (basketball), an English basketball team
- Kent Crusaders (rugby), an American rugby union team
- Seattle Totems an American junior hockey team, formerly known as Kent Crusaders
- Sittingbourne Crusaders, an English speedway team formerly known as the Kent Crusaders
