= Demitrius Bronson =

American football player and professional wrestler (born 1990)

Personal information
- Born: March 6, 1990 (age 36) Kent, Washington, U.S.

Professional wrestling career
- Ring name(s): Demitrius Bronson; Mr. Bronson
- Billed height: 5 ft 11 in (1.80 m)
- Billed weight: 215 lb (98 kg)
- Trained by: WWE Performance Center
- Debut: March 3, 2017

Demitrius Bronson (born March 6, 1990) is an American professional wrestler and retired American football running back of the National Football League. During his time in the NFL, Bronson was a member of the Seattle Seahawks and Miami Dolphins. He was signed with WWE under their developmental brand NXT.

== Early life ==
Bronson was born in Kent, Washington to Johnny and Sandra Bronson. He has two brothers, John, who played tight end for Penn State and the Arizona Cardinals and also Josiah who played defensive end for Temple Owls and after being hurt in his first year, transferred to defensive tackle for UW Huskies. Bronson finished high school with 3,810 rushing yards, and was listed as a "Red Chip" recruit by the Seattle Times. In his final high school season, he recorded 1,450 rushing yards. He graduated from Kentwood High School in 2008, and accepted a football scholarship to the University of Washington.

College recruiting
Name	Hometown	School	Height	Weight	40^{‡}	Commit date
Demitrius Bronson; RB	Kent, Washington	Kentwood High School	5 ft 10 in (1.78 m)	197 lb (89 kg)	4.50	Aug 2, 2007
Demitrius Bronson; RB	Recruit ratings: Scout: Rivals: 247Sports:					
Overall recruit ranking: Scout: 60 (RB) Rivals: NR (RB), 13 (Washington)
‡ Refers to 40-yard dash; Note: In many cases, Scout, Rivals, 247Sports, On3, and ESPN may conflict in their listings of height, weight and 40 time.; In these cases, the average was taken. ESPN grades are on a 100-point scale.; Sources: "2008 Team Ranking". Rivals.com.

== College football career ==
Bronson attended the University of Washington for two years, where he seldom played. He did not see action in 2010, but spent 2009 as a backup tailback where he had 19 carries for 89 yards. Bronson transferred to Eastern Washington University where he made his debut on September 3, 2011 against the Washington Huskies. In that game, he had 5 carries for 5 total yards, and one catch for an additional 5 yards. Bronson spent most of the 2012 season with a hamstring injury, but was listed as the starting running back entering 2013. Over his collegiate career, he totalled 687 rushing yards on 197 carries for 14 touchdowns. He also caught 8 passes for 51 yards. While at Eastern Washington University, Bronson was an academic honors candidate and majored in sociology.

== Professional football career ==
Demitrius Bronson
No. 32
- Position: Running back

Personal information
- Born: March 6, 1990 (age 36); Kent, Washington
- Listed height: 5 ft 10 in (1.78 m)
- Listed weight: 220 lb (100 kg)

Career information
- High school: Kentwood (WA)
- College: Eastern Washington
- NFL draft: 2014: undrafted

Career history
- Seattle Seahawks (2014–2015)*; Miami Dolphins (2015)*
- * Offseason or practice squad member only
- Stats at Pro Football Reference

Bronson was not invited to the NFL Combine or selected in the 2014 NFL draft.

Pre-draft measurables
Height	Weight	40-yard dash	10-yard split	20-yard split	20-yard shuttle	Three-cone drill	Vertical jump	Broad jump	Bench press
5 ft 10 in (1.78 m)	212 lb (96 kg)	4.52 s	1.57 s	2.62 s	4.25 s	6.82 s	33.5 in (0.85 m)	9 ft 6 in (2.90 m)	24 reps
All values from Eastern Washington University Pro Day

He signed a free agent contract with the Seattle Seahawks on June 17, 2014 and was released on August 25, 2014. The Seahawks re-signed him two days later, and placed him on the practice squad on November 11, 2014. In the 2014 preseason, Bronson rushed 18 times for 76 yards with no touchdowns. He was re-signed to the practice squad on February 2, 2015. On May 18, 2015, Bronson was released but eventually cleared waivers, reverting him to the Seahawks' injured reserve. On August 10, 2015, the Miami Dolphins announced the signing of Bronson.

== Professional wrestling career ==
=== WWE ===
==== NXT (2016–2018) ====
In October 2016, Bronson was announced as part of group of nine prospects who signed with NXT, the developmental organization of WWE, and began training at the WWE Performance Center. He made his professional wrestling debut at a NXT house show in Crystal River, Florida on March 3, 2017, teaming with HoHo Lun in a defeat to The Authors of Pain. Bronson made his first televised appearance on the September 27, 2017 episode of NXT, teaming with Patrick Scott in a defeat to Heavy Machinery. On June 2, 2018, Bronson was released by WWE.

== See also ==
- List of gridiron football players who became professional wrestlers
