= Fairwood, Washington =

Fairwood is the name of some places in the U.S. state of Washington:

- Fairwood, King County, Washington
- Fairwood, Spokane County, Washington
