= Maple Hills =

Maple Hills may refer to:

- Maple Hills, New Brunswick, Canada
- Maple Heights-Lake Desire, Washington, United States
- Maple Mountains, Czech Republic
