= Lindbergh High School =

Lindbergh High School may refer to:

- Lindbergh High School (Missouri), located in St. Louis, Missouri
- Lindbergh High School (Washington), located in Renton, Washington
