= Karl Best =

American baseball player (born 1959)

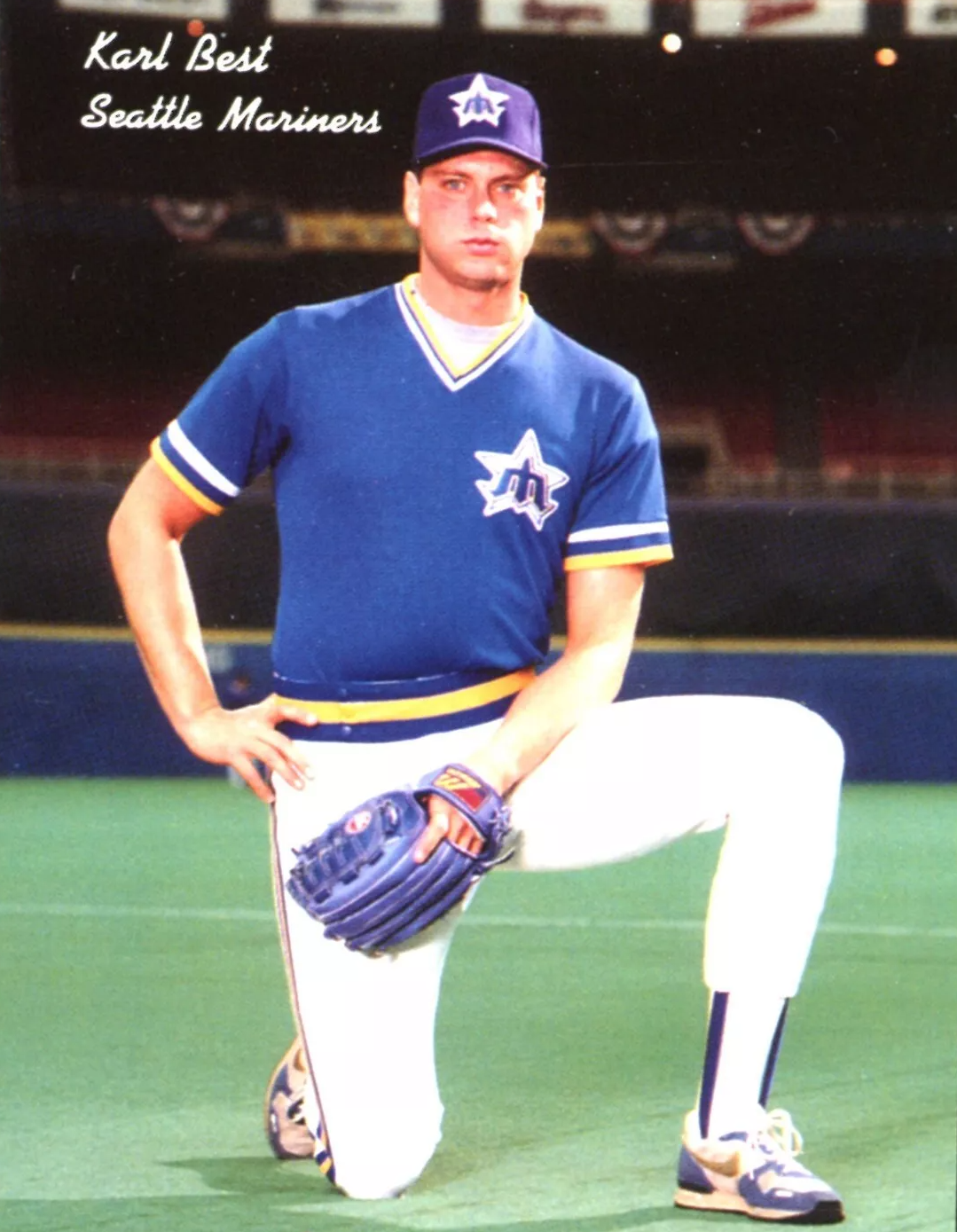
- Best with the Seattle Mariners c. 1986
- Pitcher
- Born: March 6, 1959 (age 67); Aberdeen, Washington, U.S.
- Batted: Right Threw: Right

MLB debut
- August 19, 1983, for the Seattle Mariners

Last MLB appearance
- June 20, 1988, for the Minnesota Twins

MLB statistics
- Win–loss record: 5–6
- Earned run average: 4.04
- Strikeouts: 73
- Stats at Baseball Reference

Teams
- Seattle Mariners (1983–1986); Minnesota Twins (1988)

Karl Jon Best (born March 6, 1959) is an American former professional baseball relief pitcher. He played for the Seattle Mariners and Minnesota Twins of Major League Baseball (MLB).

== Career ==
Best was born in Aberdeen, Washington, and graduated from Kent-Meridian High School in Kent, Washington, in 1977. His senior season, he was an All-North Puget Sound League baseball player. He was high school teammates with his younger brother, Jeb, and cousin, Richard. He committed to play college baseball for the Washington State Cougars before being drafted.

The Mariners selected Best in the 12th round of the 1977 MLB draft. He was a starting pitcher to begin his professional career but became a reliever in 1983. He made his MLB debut on August 19, 1983, with the Mariners. Best's longest MLB outing was a scoreless 4 2/3 innings performance to end a blowout 14–1 loss to the Twins on August 14, 1986. He dealt with injuries in 1987 and was traded to the Detroit Tigers for Bryan Kelly that June while in the minors, then was sent to the Twins for Don Schulze just before the 1988 season began. Two months after appearing in what would be his final major league game, he was traded to the San Francisco Giants in August 1988 for Alan Cockrell but never pitched an inning for them in the majors, appearing in Triple-A in the final season of his professional career.

== Personal life ==
Best is married and has two children. After his playing career, he owned a construction company.

Best's younger brother, Jeb played college baseball for the Washington Huskies and was named to the team's All-Century team. He was also drafted by the Mariners.
