= Shadow Lake, Washington =

- Census-designated place
- Location in Washington and the United States Shadow Lake (the United States)
- Coordinates: 47°24′06″N 122°04′35″W
- Country: United States
- State: Washington
- County: King

Area
  - Total: 5.33 sq mi (13.81 km^{2})
  - Land: 5.19 sq mi (13.44 km^{2})
  - Water: 0.14 sq mi (0.37 km^{2})
- Elevation: 571 ft (174 m)

Population (2010)
  - Total: 2,262
  - Density: 436/sq mi (168/km^{2})
- Time zone: UTC-8 (Pacific (PST))
  - Summer (DST): UTC-7 (PDT)
- ZIP Code: 98038
- Area code: 425
- GNIS feature ID: 2585035
- FIPS code: 53-63545

Shadow Lake is a census-designated place (CDP) in King County, Washington, United States. As of the 2020 census, Shadow Lake had a population of 2,396.

== Geography ==
Shadow Lake is located in southwestern King County and is bordered to the southeast by the city of Maple Valley, to the south by the city of Covington, and to the north by the Maple Heights-Lake Desire CDP. SE Petrovitsky Road forms the northeast border of the community. Shadow Lake is 22 miles (35 km) southeast of downtown Seattle and 26 miles (42 km) northeast of Tacoma.

According to the United States Census Bureau, the CDP has a total area of 5.3 square miles (13.8 km^{2}), of which 5.2 square miles (13.4 km^{2}) are land and 0.2 square miles (0.4 km^{2}), or 2.67%, are water. The namesake Shadow Lake water body is in the western part of the CDP.

Tahoma National Cemetery is located at (47.38722, -122.09354) in the southwest part of the CDP, off SE 240th Street.

== Demographics ==
Historical population
Census	Pop.	Note	%±
2010	2,262		—
2020	2,396		5.9%
U.S. Decennial Census; 2000 2010

Shadow Lake first appeared as a census designated place in the 2010 U.S. census.

=== Racial and ethnic composition ===
Shadow Lake CDP, Washington – Racial and ethnic composition Note: the US Census treats Hispanic/Latino as an ethnic category. This table excludes Latinos from the racial categories and assigns them to a separate category. Hispanics/Latinos may be of any race.
Race / Ethnicity (NH = Non-Hispanic)	Pop 2010	Pop 2020	% 2010	% 2020
White alone (NH)	1,980	1,936	87.53%	80.80%
Black or African American alone (NH)	24	29	1.06%	1.21%
Native American or Alaska Native alone (NH)	22	11	0.97%	0.46%
Asian alone (NH)	40	77	1.77%	3.21%
Native Hawaiian or Pacific Islander alone (NH)	8	8	0.35%	0.33%
Other race alone (NH)	0	15	0.00%	0.63%
Mixed race or Multiracial (NH)	105	173	4.64%	7.22%
Hispanic or Latino (any race)	83	147	3.67%	6.14%
Total	2,262	2,396	100.00%	100.00%
