= Evergreen High School (King County, Washington) =

Coordinates: 47°30′01″N 122°20′43″W

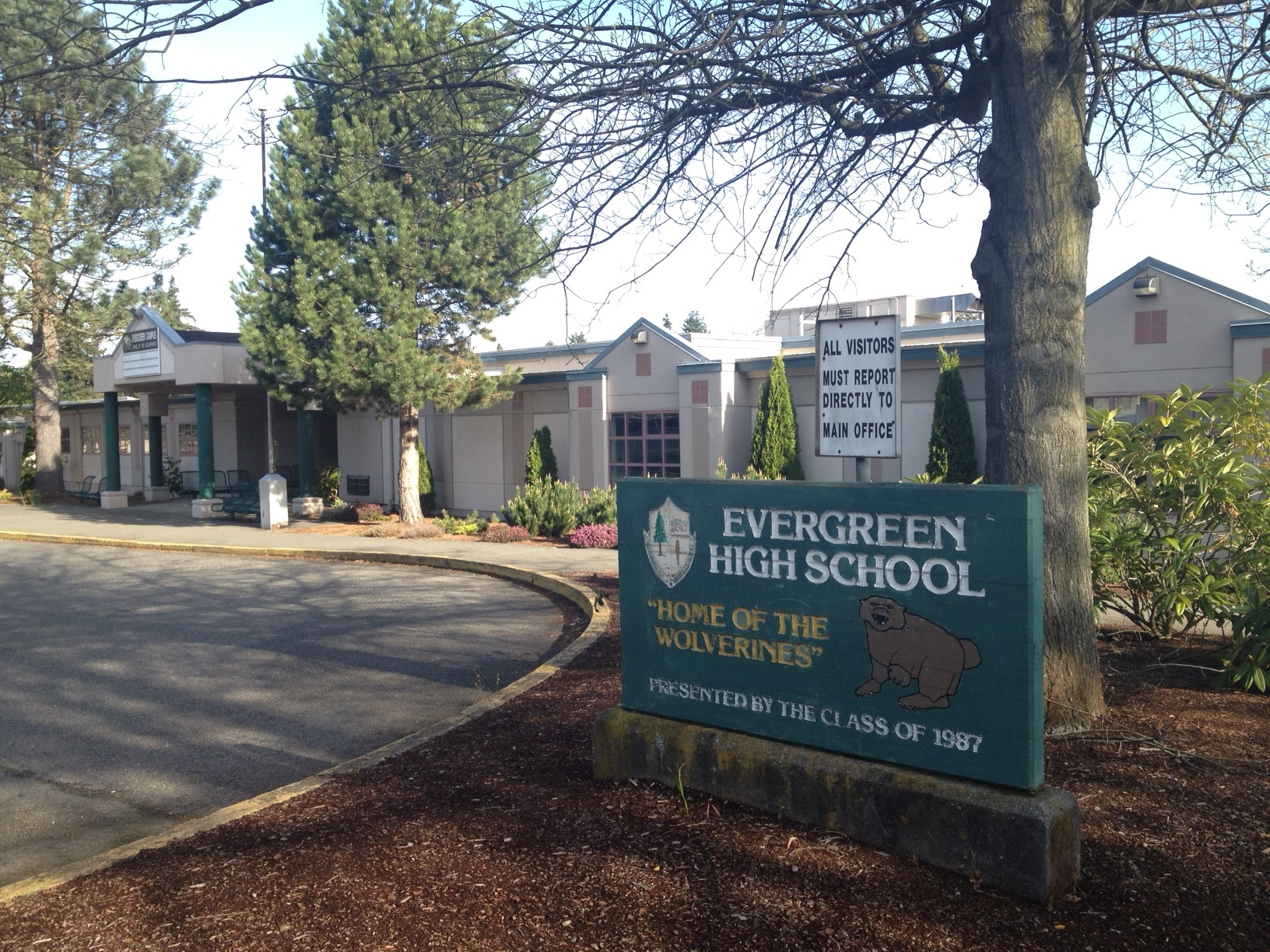

Location
- 830 SW 116th St. Seattle, Washington, 98146

Information
- School type: Public High School
- Founded: 1959
- School district: Highline School District
- Teaching staff: 57.95 (FTE)
- Grades: 9–12
- Years offered: 1959–2007, 2017–present
- Enrollment: 1,066 (2023-2024)
- Student to teacher ratio: 18.90
- Color: Green White
- Mascot: Wolverine
- Website: EHS website

Evergreen High School is a public high school in the Highline School District and located in White Center, an unincorporated area of King County, Washington. The school is located just south of the heavily polluted Hicklin Lake. Evergreen High School's mascot is the wolverine.

Currently the principal is Joseph Boyer.

== Small schools ==
In 2007, Evergreen High School was closed and replaced by three small high schools, which was part of a district-wide effort (originally funded by the Bill and Melinda Gates Foundation) to increase student achievement levels. The three small schools were named: Technology, Engineering & Communications School (TEC), Health Sciences & Human Services High School (HS3), and Arts & Academics Academy (AAA). Beginning in the 2017–2018 school year, the small schools were disbanded and the campus was re-unified as Evergreen High School.

== Campus ==
Following a successful 2022 bond measure, Evergreen High School was completely rebuilt. The new facility, designed by Bassetti Architects and constructed by Cornerstone General Contractors, opened to students on September 3, 2025, in time for the 2025–26 school year.

The building is approximately 231,000 square feet and organized into two primary structures: a three-story mass-timber academic wing and a larger multipurpose building. Together, the spaces include classrooms, science labs, Career and Technical Education (CTE) facilities, a library, performing arts classrooms and auditorium, gymnasium and fitness center, food service kitchen, and administrative offices.

The overall project cost about US$213 million and also includes demolition of the old buildings and significant site work, such as new athletic fields, tennis courts, bus loop, parking areas, and drop-off lanes. Site work is scheduled for completion by summer 2026.

== Athletics ==
Evergreen's sports teams are known as the Wolverines. Their colors are green and white.

Formerly members of the now defunct Seamount League, Evergreen is a member of the Mountain Division of the 2A South Puget Sound League since the 2016–17 school year. Evergeen was the 1968 North Puget Sound League Basketball champion, and finished 3rd in the State Basketball Championship.

From 1969–1982, the WIAA Boys State Cross Country Championships were held at Evergreen High School. The WIAA Girls State Cross Country Championships were held at the Evergreen course from 1976 to 1982.

== Notable alumni ==
- Jack Thompson – Class of 1974 – Quarterback for Washington State University and played in the NFL from 1979 to 1984.
- Senio Kelemete – Class of 2008 – Offensive Tackle for University of Washington and former Arizona Cardinals and New Orleans Saints player.
