= Senio Kelemete =

American football player (born 1990)

No. 64, 65, 68
- Position: Offensive guard

Personal information
- Born: May 10, 1990 (age 36); Seattle, Washington, U.S.
- Listed height: 6 ft 3 in (1.91 m)
- Listed weight: 301 lb (137 kg)

Career information
- High school: Evergreen (Seattle)
- College: Washington
- NFL draft: 2012: 5th round, 151st overall pick

Career history
- Arizona Cardinals (2012); New Orleans Saints (2013–2017); Houston Texans (2018–2020); San Francisco 49ers (2021)*; Los Angeles Chargers (2021)
- * Offseason or practice squad member only

Awards and highlights
- Second-team All-Pac-12 (2011)

Career NFL statistics
- Games played: 97
- Games started: 44
- Stats at Pro Football Reference

Senio Kelemete (born May 10, 1990) is an American former professional football player who was an offensive guard in the National Football League (NFL) for the Arizona Cardinals, New Orleans Saints, Houston Texans and Los Angeles Chargers. He played college football for the Washington Huskies from 2008 to 2011.

== Early life ==
A native of Seattle, Washington, Kelemete attended Evergreen High School, where he was a four-year starter on the varsity football team. As a junior in 2006, he earned first-team all-league as both and offensive and defensive lineman as he helped the team to an 8–2 record. In 2007, Evergreen went 9–2 and went the state playoffs for the first time since 2001 while Kelemete was honored as the Seamount League's Lineman of the Year on both offense and defense.

Regarded as a three-star recruit by Rivals.com, Kelemete was ranked as the No. 45 offensive tackle prospect in his class. He chose Washington over offers from California, and Oregon State. The Huskies recruited Kelemete as a defensive lineman.

== College career ==
In his true freshman season at the University of Washington, Kelemete played in eight of the Huskies' 12 games as a defensive tackle, including four starts: vs. BYU, Oklahoma, Stanford, and Arizona. In the off-season, he was moved over to offensive line, and started 11 of the Huskies' 12 games at right guard (all but UCLA) in 2009. He earned honorable mention All-Pac-10 honors and was named the John P. Angel Lineman of the Year at the Huskies' postseason awards banquet.

For his junior year, Kelemete was moved from guard to left tackle and named team captain. He started all 13 games, one of only two UW o-linemen to do so. Still a team captain in 2011, Kelemete started all 13 games at left tackle again, and was named second-team All-Pac-12. He was a member of the North team at the 2012 Senior Bowl.

== Professional career ==
=== Pre-draft ===
Projected as a fourth round selection by Sports Illustrated, he was ranked as the No. 9 offensive guard prospect. Kelemete was praised for his "great use of body positioning and blocking angles", but criticized for his lack of "top footwork in pass protection".

Pre-draft measurables
Height	Weight	Arm length	Hand span	40-yard dash	10-yard split	20-yard split	20-yard shuttle	Three-cone drill	Vertical jump	Broad jump	Bench press
6 ft 3 5/8 in (1.92 m)	307 lb (139 kg)	33 1/2 in (0.85 m)	9 5/8 in (0.24 m)	5.52 s	1.88 s	3.06 s	4.58 s	7.77 s	25 in (0.64 m)	8 ft 5 in (2.57 m)	21 reps
All values from NFL Combine

=== Arizona Cardinals ===
The Arizona Cardinals selected Kelemete in the fifth round (151st overall) of the 2012 NFL draft. The Arizona Cardinals selected three offensive linemen in 2012, including Bobby Massie (fourth round) and Nate Potter (seventh round). Kelemete was the highest UW offensive lineman selected since Joe Toledo in 2006.

In his first NFL game against the San Francisco 49ers, Kelemete became the first offensive lineman in NFL history to make a reception in his debut when he caught a deflected Brian Hoyer pass intended for wide receiver Andre Roberts for 10 yards.

=== New Orleans Saints ===
He was signed to the New Orleans Saints' practice squad on September 2, 2013. He was released on September 24, 2013, but was re-signed to their practice squad on September 26, 2013. On March 4, 2016, the Saints re-signed Kelemete to a two-year deal.

In 2017, Kelemete's versatility was on display as the Saints' primary backup guard and tackle, starting eight games at both guard and tackle spots.

=== Houston Texans ===
On March 14, 2018, Kelemete signed a three-year contract with the Houston Texans. He was named the starting left guard to begin the 2018 season. He started 14 games, missing two due to injury. On September 25, 2019, Kelemete was placed on injured reserve.

On July 27, 2020, Kelemete signed a one-year contract extension with the Texans. He was released by the Texans on February 23, 2021.

=== San Francisco 49ers ===
On June 11, 2021, Kelemete signed a one-year contract with the San Francisco 49ers. He was released on August 31, 2021 and re-signed to the practice squad the next day.

=== Los Angeles Chargers ===
On October 12, 2021, Kelemete was signed by the Los Angeles Chargers off the 49ers practice squad.

On June 14, 2022, the New Orleans Saints hosted Kelemete for a workout, but no deal was reached.

== Personal life ==
Senio is married to Giovana Kelemete, mother to Senio Jr.
