= Hicklin Lake =

Lake in King County, Washington

- Aerial view of Hicklin Lake, Evergreen High School and Cascade Middle School are just to the south, and Dick Thurnau Park can be seen directly to the north

- Location within Washington (state) Location within the United States
- Location: White Center, Washington
- Coordinates: 47°30′11″N 122°20′42″W
- Basin countries: United States
- Surface area: 5 acres (2.0 ha)
- Max. depth: 22 ft (6.7 m)
- Surface elevation: 340 ft (100 m)

Hicklin Lake is a small lake in the White Center census-designated place of King County, Washington, near Evergreen High School, Cascade Middle School, and Dick Thurnau Park (Lakewood Park). Due to its geography and drainage basin, it has suffered from pollution and eutrophication. Artificial islands were placed in the lake in 2013 to reduce pollution, but they have failed to reduce nutrient concentrations.

== Name ==
Hicklin Lake is named for Leonard Hicklin, who settled in White Center in the 1880s. It was briefly named Garrett Lake after L.B. Garrett, the owner of the lake after Hicklin died in 1931. The lake was erroneously known as Hicks Lake until 2011, when Dick Thurnau petitioned to have the correct name restored. Lakewood Park, located on the lake's north shore, was renamed Dick Thurnau Park in honor of Thurnau's efforts to rename the lake and restore its water quality.

== Pollution ==
Before development, Hicklin Lake was located in a wetland. However, in the 1960s, this wetland was replaced with a parking lot, and the main inflow to the lake is now stormwater pipes. This untreated stormwater has brought heavy metals, phosphorus, and fecal coliform bacteria to the lake. The lake has no natural outlet, exacerbating the problem by increasing the concentration of pollutants. Chlorophyll levels are high, indicating the presence of algal blooms. The lake has consistently had poor water quality since development began.

Another problem due to stormwater inflows is flooding during the winter. The large fluctuations in water levels prevent emergent plants from growing along the shoreline. These changes in the lake's water level have flooded Dick Thurnau Park, so the county installed pumps to release the excess water into the Puget Sound.

Swimming was once allowed, but there are no longer lifeguards or facilities. While some argue this is due to poorer water quality, King County states that water quality levels were similar in the 1960s (when swimming was allowed), and that the major change has been in public perception.

== Artificial islands ==
King County has routinely treated the lake with alum to reduce populations of blue-green algae, but this has failed to work long-term. In July 2013, two 600-square-foot (56 m^{2}) artificial floating islands were introduced in an attempt to reduce pollution. The islands contain native vegetation, and it was hoped that microbes in their roots would consume phosphorus (a major contributor to algal blooms and eutrophication). However, a 2017 study showed that the islands failed to substantially reduce phosphorus concentrations.
