= White Center, Washington =

- Census-designated place
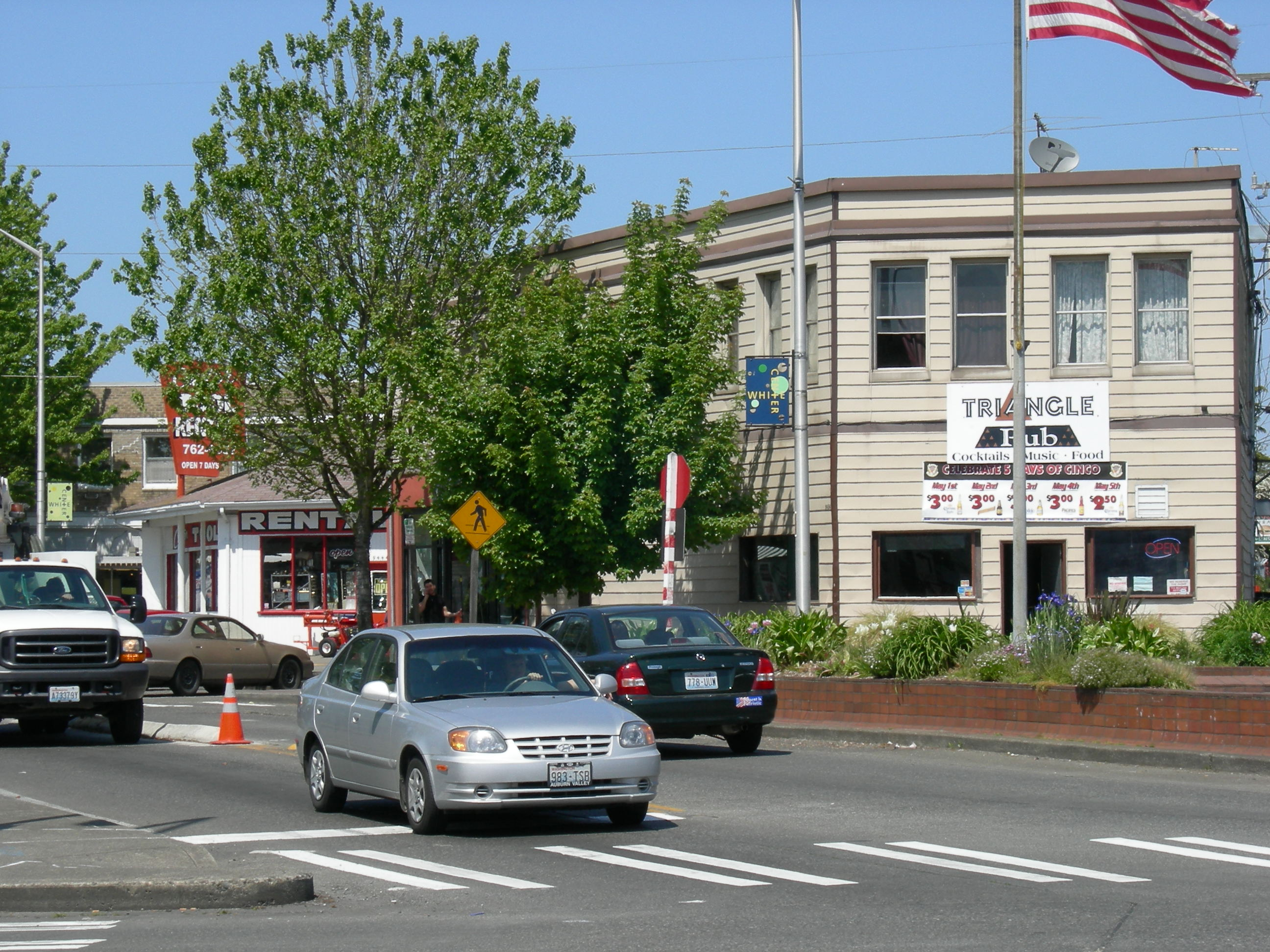

- Location of White Center, Washington
- Coordinates: 47°30′19″N 122°20′32″W
- Country: United States
- State: Washington
- County: King

Area
  - Total: 2.25 sq mi (5.83 km^{2})
  - Land: 2.24 sq mi (5.81 km^{2})
  - Water: 0.0077 sq mi (0.02 km^{2})
- Elevation: 381 ft (116 m)

Population (2020)
  - Total: 16,631
  - Density: 7,410/sq mi (2,860/km^{2})
- Time zone: UTC-8 (Pacific (PST))
  - Summer (DST): UTC-7 (PDT)
- ZIP Codes: 98106, 98146, 98168
- Area code(s): 206, 564
- FIPS code: 53-78225
- GNIS feature ID: 2409580

White Center is a census-designated place (CDP) in King County, Washington, United States. It lies between West Seattle and Burien. The population was 16,631 at the 2020 census.

White Center is sometimes referred to by the nickname "Rat City" due to the historical presence of a military Relocation and Training Center during World War II. The Rat City Rollergirls are a Seattle roller derby team that began training in White Center.

== History ==
In 1912, farmers near White Center paid for an interurban line, the Highland Park and Lake Burien Railway, to pass through White Center to reach Burien. A commercial core developed around the line between Southwest Roxbury Street and 16th Avenue Southwest.

=== Origin of the name ===
In 1918, local developers George White and Hiram Green decided the name of the community in a coin toss. White won the coin toss, and thereafter the community was called White Center.

=== Incorporation ===
White Center is an urbanized area of King County that is not incorporated as part of a city. Seattle has been working towards incorporating the area since the mid-2000s. An area south of White Center, known as North Highline, was annexed by neighboring Burien on April 1, 2010. The Seattle City Council rejected annexation of White Center in 2009, and a measure to annex White Center to Burien was rejected by voters in 2012. Plans to annex White Center got a boost in March 2016 when the state legislature directed that $7 million go to the city of Seattle if it annexes the area. Completing annexation would have required approval by the voters in the area as well as by the Seattle City Council, and would not have been completed before 2017.

White Center's LGBTQ community has grown in recent years, and the first White Center Pride was hosted in 2019.

== Geography ==
White Center is located in western King County. It has a total area of 2.25 square miles (5.83 km^{2}), of which 0.01 square miles (0.02 km^{2}), or 0.41%, are water.

The CDP is bordered to the north and west by Seattle, to the east by unincorporated Boulevard Park, and to the south by the city of Burien. Washington State Route 509 forms the eastern border of the White Center CDP. Downtown Seattle is 7 miles (11 km) to the north, and the center of Burien is 3 miles (5 km) to the south.

The heavily polluted Hicklin Lake is located within White Center.

== Demographics ==
Historical population
Census	Pop.	Note	%±
1980	19,362		—
1990	20,531		6.0%
2000	20,975		2.2%
2010	13,495		−35.7%
2020	16,631		23.2%
U.S. Decennial Census; 1970 1980 1990; 2000 2010; Census area in 1980 & 1990 enumerated as White Center-Shorewood.

The community first appeared as a census designated place under the name White-Center Shorewood in the 1980 U.S. census. The name was changed to White Center for the 2000 U.S. census.

=== 2020 census ===
As of the 2020 census, White Center had a population of 16,631. The median age was 36.0 years. 22.9% of residents were under the age of 18 and 11.6% of residents were 65 years of age or older. For every 100 females there were 100.2 males, and for every 100 females age 18 and over there were 97.4 males age 18 and over.

100.0% of residents lived in urban areas, while 0.0% lived in rural areas.

There were 5,915 households in White Center, of which 32.5% had children under the age of 18 living in them. Of all households, 40.2% were married-couple households, 21.4% were households with a male householder and no spouse or partner present, and 28.6% were households with a female householder and no spouse or partner present. About 24.2% of all households were made up of individuals and 7.8% had someone living alone who was 65 years of age or older.

There were 6,183 housing units, of which 4.3% were vacant. The homeowner vacancy rate was 1.6% and the rental vacancy rate was 3.6%.

Racial composition as of the 2020 census
Race	Number	Percent
White	5,967	35.9%
Black or African American	2,414	14.5%
American Indian and Alaska Native	313	1.9%
Asian	3,597	21.6%
Native Hawaiian and Other Pacific Islander	221	1.3%
Some other race	2,123	12.8%
Two or more races	1,996	12.0%
Hispanic or Latino (of any race)	3,730	22.4%

=== 2010 census ===
As of the 2010 census, there were 13,495 people, 4,920 households, and 3,105 families residing in the CDP. The population density was 5,996.0 people per square mile (2,315.1/km^{2}). There were 5,235 housing units at an average density of 2,326.0/sq mi (898.1/km^{2}). The racial makeup of the CDP was 47.0% White (39.6% Non-Hispanic White), 9.0% Black or African American, 1.6% American Indian and Alaska Native, 22.9% Asian, 1.7% Native Hawaiian and Other Pacific Islander, 11.4% from other races, and 6.4% from two or more races. Hispanic or Latino people of any race were 21.5% of the population.

There were 4,920 households, out of which 35.0% had individuals under 18 years, 39.2% were husband-wife families, 16.7% had a female householder with no husband present, and 36.9% were non-families. 26.7% of all households were made up of individuals, and 6.5% had someone living alone who was 65 years of age or older. The average household size was 2.73 and the average family size was 3.29.

In terms of age distribution, 23.7% were under the age of 18, 67.3% from 18 to 64, and 9.0% were 65 years of age or older. The median age was 36.1 years. For every 100 females there were 102.6 males. For every 100 females age 18 and over, there were 102.0 males.

=== Income and poverty ===
The median income for a household in the CDP was $35,448, and the median income for a family was $41,433. Males who worked full-time, year-round had a median income of $32,392 versus $28,893 for females. The per capita income for the CDP was $19,852. About 23.8% of families and 25.0% of the population were below the poverty line, including 38.3% of those under age 18 and 10.5% of those age 65 or over. The typical home for sale in White Center was built in 1969, which is older than the typical home for sale in Washington.

== Parks and recreation ==
White Center has four public parks that are maintained by the county government and is near other parks in neighboring Seattle and Burien. The largest is Steve Cox Memorial Park, renamed from White Center Park after renovations completed in 2008, and includes a community center that was constructed by the Works Progress Administration in 1940. The park is home to Mel Olson Stadium, a baseball stadium with 1,100 seats in a split grandstand and a FieldTurf infield. It was renovated in 2008 and is home to several local school teams. The DubSea Fish Sticks, a college summer team in the Pacific International League established in 2015 and renamed in 2022, play at Mel Olson Stadium.

== Education ==
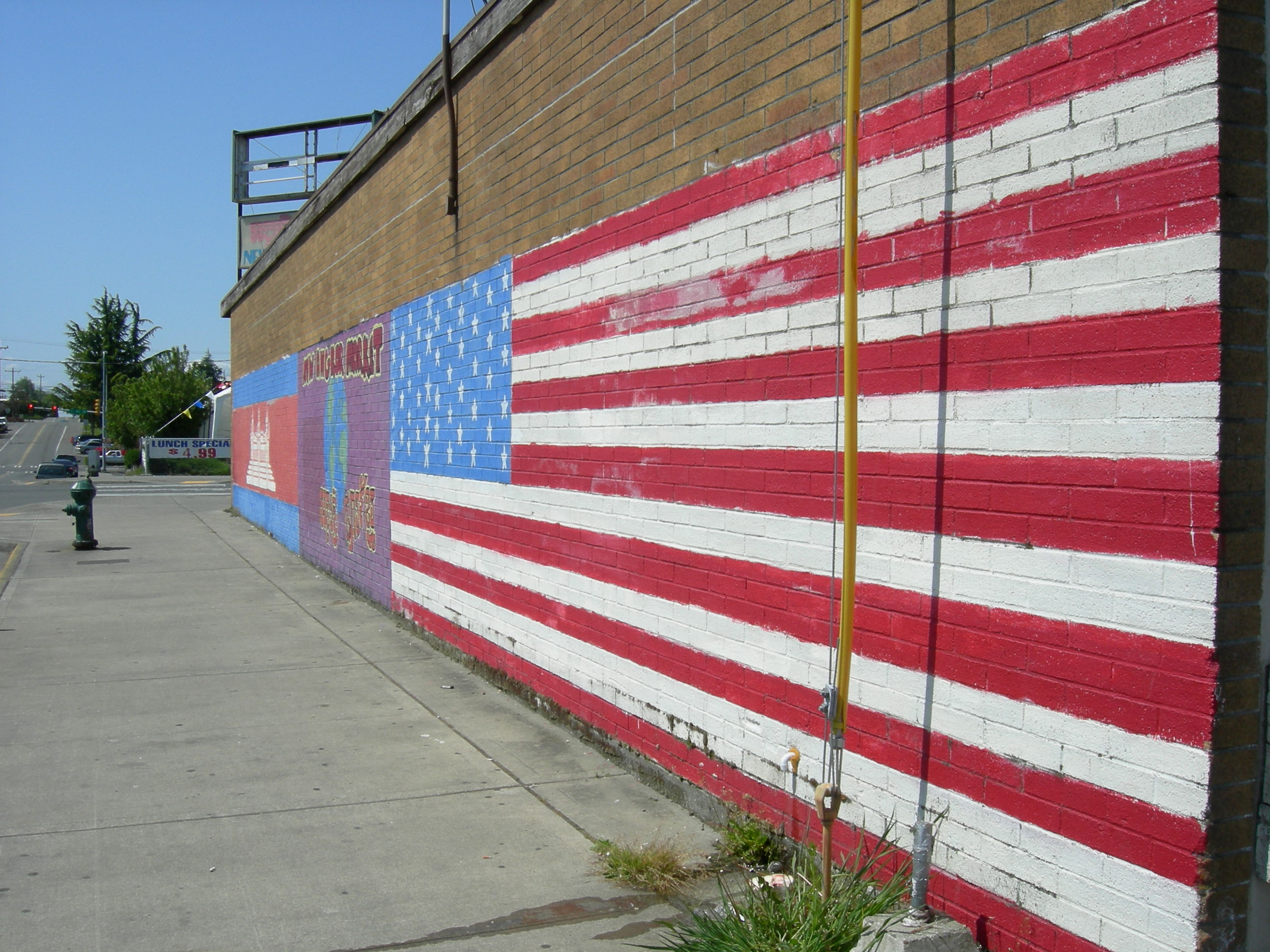
U.S. and Cambodian flags on the side of the New Angkor Market

White Center is part of the Highline School District, which covers much of southwestern King County. Elementary schools include Beverly Park Elementary, Mount View Elementary, Southern Heights Elementary, and White Center Heights Elementary. Secondary schools include Rainier Prep Public Charter School, Cascade Middle School, New Start High School, and Evergreen High School.

The community is served by two branches of the King County Library System, which covers most of the county. The first library in White Center was conceived by a local school parent–teacher association in 1943 in the basement of a local fieldhouse and supported by the county library system. A portable building was moved from Lower Queen Anne in Seattle to White Center in 1961 to serve as a new library and was later replaced by a permanent building on August 29, 1976, funded by a bond issue. In 2008, a second branch opened in the Greenbridge development. The White Center Library was moved to a new building on Southwest 107th Street that opened on May 21, 2026, and has 10,000 square feet (930 m^{2}) of space. It cost $8.5 million to construct and was delayed several years amid uncertainty over the area's annexation votes.

== Infrastructure ==
=== Transportation ===
White Center is served by King County Metro, which operates bus service to nearby cities and areas. The RapidRide H Line, opened in 2023, provides frequency limited-stop service from Downtown Seattle to White Center and Burien.

== Notable people ==
- Richard Hugo, poet
- Floyd Johnson, boxer
- Jack Thompson, football player
