= Lindbergh High School (Washington) =

Coordinates: 47°27′17″N 122°10′01″W

Charles A. Lindbergh High School
- 16426 128th Ave SE; Renton, WA; 98058; United States

Information
- Type: High school
- Motto: Ad astra
- Established: 1972
- School district: Renton School District
- Principal: Thomas Caudle
- Teaching staff: 57.60 (FTE)
- Enrollment: 1,277 (2023-2024)
- Student to teacher ratio: 22.17
- Colors: Navy, White, and Red.
- Athletics conference: 2A KingCo League
- Mascot: Tony the Eagle
- Website: lindbergh.rentonschools.us

Lindbergh High School is a (senior) high school in the southeastern section of Renton, Washington, a suburb of Seattle, in the Renton School District. It is named after Charles A. Lindbergh, the famous aviator who was first to fly solo across the Atlantic in 1927. The school was founded in 1972. Freshmen, sophomores and juniors attended the first year, making the class of 1974 the first to graduate. Lindbergh's school motto is ad astra, which is Latin for "to the stars". The crest features the Spirit of St. Louis (the plane that Charles Lindbergh flew), and the school's motto flanked by stars with the dates 1927 and 1972, respectively.

== Facilities ==
=== Architecture ===
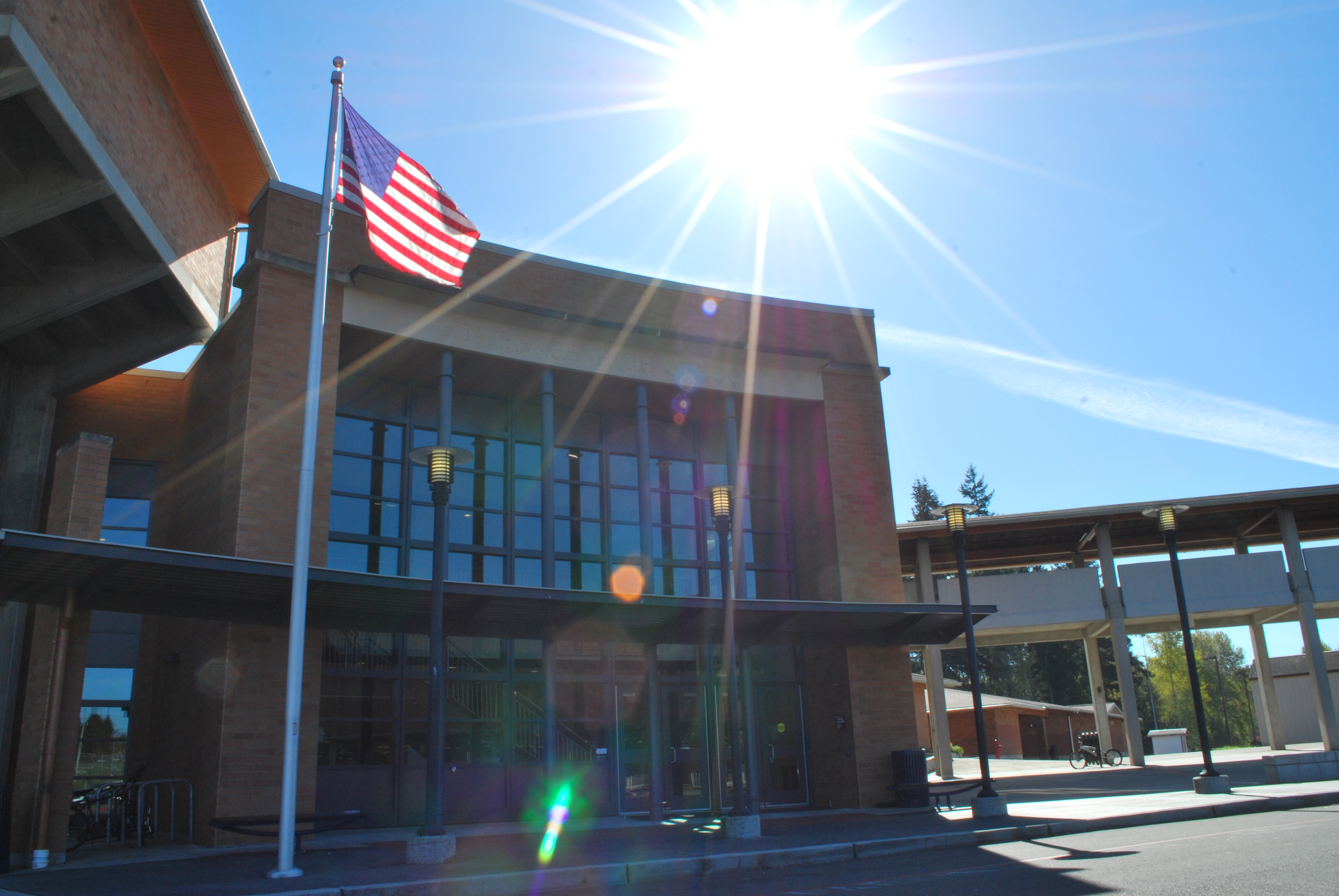
Lindbergh High School Main Entrance Commons and Skybridge

Lindbergh features unusual architecture compared to traditional boxy high school buildings. Originally intended to be a community college, the school is constructed with concrete floors and brick walls with wooden beams supporting sloped roofs. The building stretches up and across a small hill. It was originally built around two "houses", where home rooms and lockers were located, with a third planned house for expansion that was never built. The floors and sections of the school still function as a kind of departmental divide, with the right side of the third floor containing the math classes, the first floor containing the language arts classes, etc. Another distinct feature is a skybridge linking the main building with the gymnasium and the student parking lot.

In 1998, Renton voters approved a construction bond to rebuild, remodel, and renovate school buildings throughout the district. Following this bond, other unique architectural features of Lindbergh were replaced or redesigned. The school was originally built featuring many open areas in addition to conventional walled classrooms, but most of these spaces were closed by the 1990s. The original lockers were small wooden cube-shaped coat racks placed out in the open, but this use was abandoned as coats could not be securely hung and the wooden hangers were found to be easily broken, and were replaced by conventional steel lockers.

The former steel and auto shop was converted to a robotics lab as of the mid-1990s. As of June 2006, building of a new commons area is complete, and as of the 2007–2008 school year, all bathrooms within the school have been remodeled. The school also recently underwent a 2-year remodel to replace asbestos-containing areas of the building. During the spring of 2009, a football and track field have been constructed behind the school. In 2010, the weight room has been renovated along with replacing the roofs and window exterior. At the start of the 2011–2012 school year, the staff parking lot, walkways have been remodeled and added throughout the school. When the summer vacation 2012 started, the hill in the center of the lower parking lot has been torn out to make improvements on both student and lower parking lots have begun, this all summer long construction consists of making more parking spaces and the improvement of traffic when dropping and picking up students, and an undercover area for students to stand in when it rains or on warm sunny days to keep them dry and away from the sun's rays up in the upper parking lot. While that was in process, inside the building had some undergone renovations as well. Classrooms with emergency exit doors have all been replaced with brand new doors.

In the 2018–2019 school year, all classroom doors were replaced with ones that are able to be locked from the inside rather than the previous models that were only lockable from the outside. The new door is made of steel and has a wood grain finish on the surface along with smaller windows.

== Demographics ==
Lindbergh High School in the 1970s, as seen from the skybridge

When the school was opened in 1972, each class had only a handful of Asian, Hispanic and African American students, though one notable Asian American family sent seven children to MIT and Stanford. Today, Lindbergh, along with Renton High School, Foster High School, Tyee Educational Complex, and many other south King County schools, is noted in its region for its diversity. In 2013, Lindbergh had an Asian student population of 24.7%, as well as nearly 20.3% African American, 20% Hispanic, and 1.9% American Indian/Alaskan Native/Pacific Islander. 49% of students are eligible for free or reduced price meals, 13% receive special education services, 12.5% are transitional bilingual (and many more are native speakers of both English and another language).

== Sports ==
Lindbergh is a member of the 2A KingCo League as of the 2022–2023 athletic season. The league includes Foster, Highline, Tyee, Renton, Evergreen and Sammamish high schools.

In 1973, the Lindbergh Eagles went undefeated in football with a record of 9–0, beating the likes of Kennedy, Yelm, and Glacier High Schools. LHS football made their second state playoff game in school history in 2008, losing to the then-1st-ranked Bellevue High School. The following season, Lindbergh won the Seamount Championship, their first league title since 1986, and won a state playoff game for the first time in school history against Ferndale.

The Eagles baseball team won back to back championships in 1994–1995. Lindbergh produced David Riske, a long time MLB player. The Lady Eagles softball team also won the state championship title in 1990.

In 2011, the Lindbergh Eagles boys' cross country team won the state 2A championships. They edged Bellingham's Sehome Mariners by one point for the win. This was Lindbergh's first cross country title as a team. Lindbergh's Sarah Reiter won the girls' 2A individual title in 2010, and Sam Ahlbeck won the boys' 3A individual title in 2004.

Wrestling has also produced a 2007 girls' state champion, Sierra Paull, and the 2016 boys' 182 weight class state champion, Diego Gallegos. In the 2008–2009 season, the Eagles produced a Seamount League high of three state placers including Mark Garcia (6th place at 103 lbs), Luke Garcia (8th place at 112 lbs), and Isiah Corwin (5th place at 152 lbs). Corwin was again a state placer in the 2009–2010 season (3rd Place at 160 lbs). Numerous other wrestlers from this school have placed at State.

The girls' basketball team first represented LHS at state in 2003. The 2005–2006 team, buoyed by the play of Center Marcisa McMillan, not only returned to State, but became the first Lindbergh girls' basketball team to win a play-off game. Boys' Basketball also has had some relative success as of late appearing in the West Central District Playoffs every year since 2011, even placing 5th in state in 2012.

In 2016, the Lindbergh Eagles girls' swim team went undefeated with a 14–0 record, defeating the usual top league team Steilacoom by 39 points. They later on defended their title in 2017 and 2018 and currently remain undefeated. The 2016–2017 state placers are Parsin Lwai (8th place in 100 Back) and Rachel Knittle (8th place in 100 Breast). The 2017–2018 state placers are the 200 Medley Relay team (P. Lwai, R. Knittle, I. Goe, M. Martz in 7th place), Rachel Knittle (5th place in 100 Fly and 8th place in 100 Breast). The 2018–2019 state placers are the 200 Medley Relay team (P. Lwai, I. Goe, R. Knittle, M. Martzin 8th place), Annie Robinson (6th place in 50 Free and 7th in 100 Free), Rachel Knittle (5th in 100 Fly and 7th in 100 Breast), 200 Free Relay team (M. Jones, M. Martz, D. Ortiz, A. Robinson in 4th place), and the 400 Free Relay team (A. Robinson, D. Ortiz, M. Jones, R. Knittle in 5th place). Numerous other swimmers from the team qualified for state and placed in consolation heats.

Sports programs

- Baseball
- Basketball (Boys')
- Basketball (Girls')
- bowling (Girls)
- Cheer
- Cross Country
- Football
- Golf (Boys')
- Golf (Girls')
- Gymnastics
- Soccer (Boys')
- Soccer (Girls')
- Softball
- Swimming (Boys')
- Swimming (Girls')
- Tennis
- Track & Field
- Volleyball (Girls')
- Wrestling

== Feeder schools ==
Most of the students entering Lindbergh went to Nelsen Middle School. Feeder elementary schools include Cascade, Renton Park, Benson Hill, and Tiffany Park elementary schools. In addition, most alumni of the local K-10 alternative school, the HOME Program, attend Running Start via Lindbergh after finishing second year. These facilities are located across the Fairwood, Cascade, and Benson Hill regions. Kentridge, part of the neighboring Kent School District, borders Lindbergh to the south, and Renton and Hazen high schools serving to the west and north respectively.

== Notable people ==
- Matt Briggs, Class of 1989, novelist and short story writer.
- Nate Burleson, former NFL wide receiver. Transferred after his freshman season
- Jak Knight, Class of 2012, comedian and actor.
- Rick Mallory, Class of 1979, former NFL guard with the Tampa Bay Buccaneers.
- Nick Pollock, Class of 1986, singer-songwriter.
- David Riske, Class of 1995, former Major League Baseball relief pitcher.
- Craig Wrolstad, Class of 1983, current NFL Referee.
