= Tess Henley =

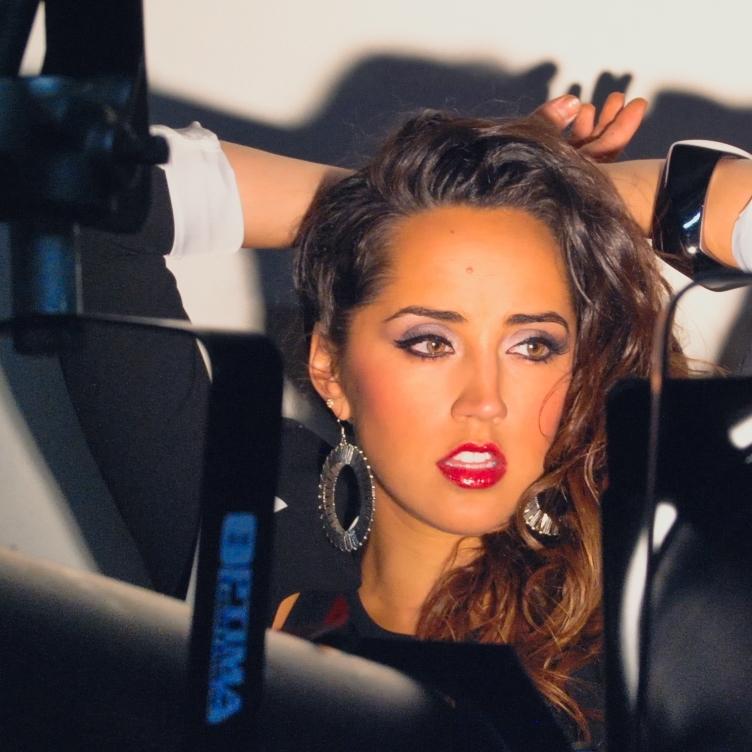
- Henley posing

Background information
- Born: October 31, 1987 (age 38)
- Origin: Kent, Washington, United States
- Genres: Soul, rhythm and blues
- Years active: 2008–present.
- Website: http://www.tesshenley.com

Tess Henley is an American singer-songwriter and pianist from Kent, Washington, United States. Born into a musical family, Henley studied and performed since childhood before launching a career performing soul music. Since 2008, she has released several full-length albums, EPs, and singles and made her television debut on Jimmy Kimmel Live! in 2015.

== Early life ==
Tess grew up as a middle child born to a professional singer. She is the younger sister of musician Carson Henley. She started taking Suzuki Method piano lessons at the age of 3. Henley graduated as valedictorian from Kentlake High School in Kent, Washington in 2006 where she played year-round basketball and soccer. In 2010, Henley graduated from University of Washington with a degree in Communications.

== Career ==
In 2008, Henley released her debut album, Easy to Love. In 2011, Tess won Budweiser’s National Superfest Summer Block Party competition to win $25,000 and opened for Jill Scott and Anthony Hamilton (musician). Also during 2011, Henley was a top three finalist in R&B category for the John Lennon Worldwide Songwriting Competition, the winner of the 2011 International Song Competition for SoulTracks. and the winner of an Independent Music Award in 2012.

After releasing a deluxe edition of Easy to Love through Tower Records Japan in September 2011, Henley released a 7" vinyl in October 2011 of the duet, "What You Won't Do for Love", featuring Mycle Wastman from The Voice, for the Japan Earthquake and Tsunami Relief Fund.

In May 2013, Henley released her sophomore studio album High Heels & Sneakers, produced by Dice Raw from The Roots and Khari Mateen. Also in 2013, Tess received the Vox Pop R&B/Soul Independent Music Award for "Daydreaming." Henley was then named grand prize winner of the Show Me The Music Songwriting Contest with her song, "Who Are You."

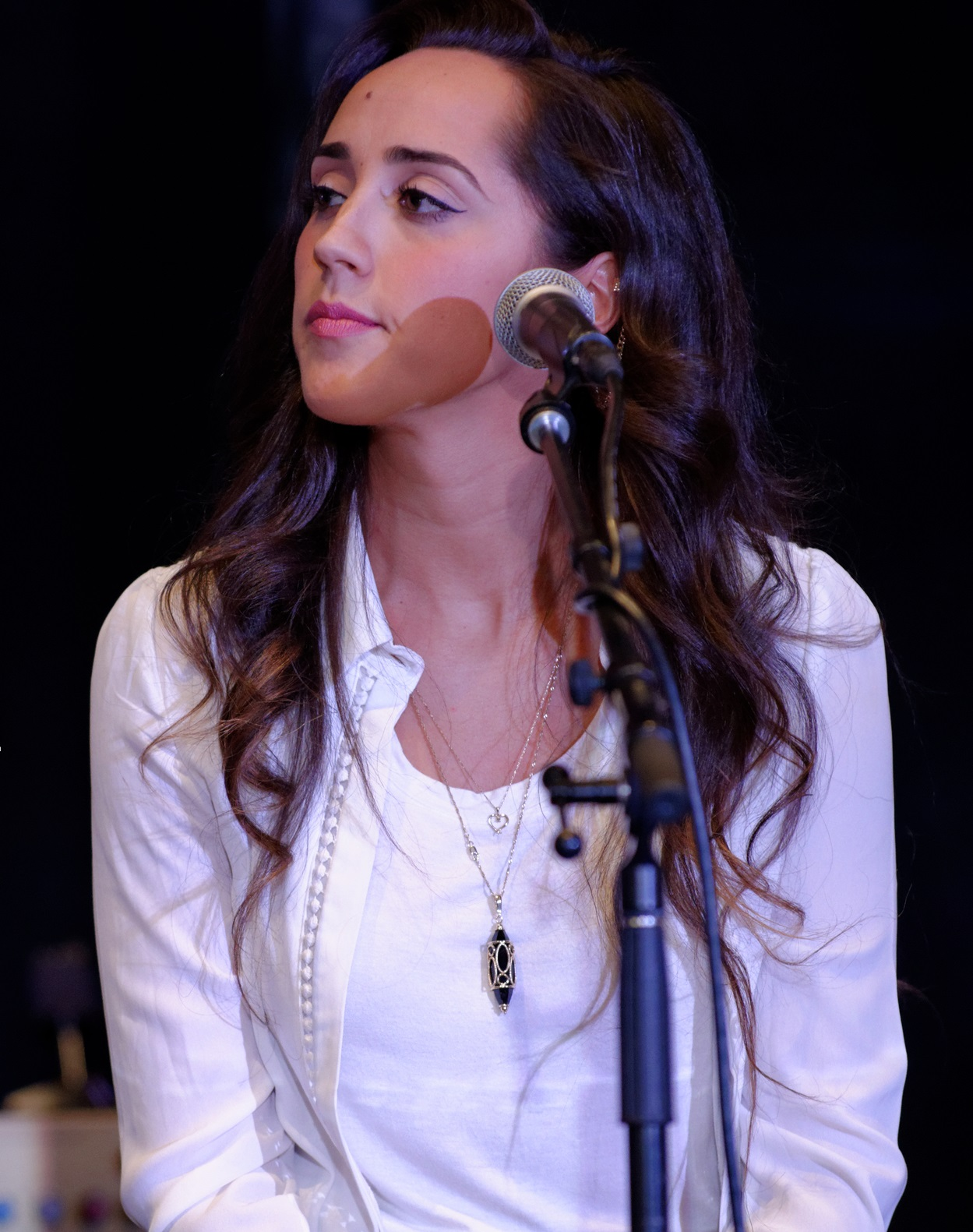
Henley, 2015

Producer Don Was selected Tess as the Guitar Center Singer-Songwriter III grand prize winner in March 2014. She became the first female winner in the competition's history, receiving $25,000, music gear, and an EP to be recorded with Don Was.

In mid-August 2014, Henley went to Henson Recording Studios in Los Angeles with producer Was and session musicians Mike Finnigan, James Gadson, Mark Goldenberg, James "Hutch" Hutchinson, Davide Rossi, and Michito Sanchez to record. The album Wonderland was released in early 2015. On January 22, 2015, Henley made her national television debut on Jimmy Kimmel Live!, performing "Positively Me" and "Wonderland" from the album. Teen Vogue premiered the music video for "Wonderland".

Following her appearance on Jimmy Kimmel Live!, Henley performed at the NAMM Show and Sundance Film Festival, where she played eight showcases in three days, including the Sundance Institute Music Café, produced by ASCAP.

In July of 2015, Henley opened for Boy George and Culture Club at The Greek Theater in Los Angeles and The Greek Theater in Berkeley, California. That same year, she was also supporting act on national tours for Eric Hutchinson and Jon McLaughlin, as well as a residency with Bettye LaVette.

The following year in 2016, Henley opened for Earth, Wind & Fire at Chateau Ste Michelle Winery.

Her 2019 EP, Better, included the singles “Better” and “Same Girl”, her version of the 1969 Barbara Acklin song, “Am I the Same Girl”. The EP released on August 2, 2019, the same month Tess was the supporting act for Lianne La Havas’ U.S. tour.

On December 11, 2020, she was featured on "Funny Seeing You Here" from the album, Thats What They All Say by Jack Harlow.

In July 2022, Henley released the single "Good For Me".

On November 18, 2022, Henley released her 3rd studio album. Henley explained the title, Paramount, as “the never straight line of building the things of paramount importance – fighting for them, gaining them, losing them, redefining them, learning from them, loving them. That is Paramount.” The album includes collaborations with Jesse Boykins III, Naz, Wynne Bennett, Yakob and Ari Balouzian.

In 2025, Henley scored the short film, Terror Keeps You Slender, with songs from Leon Michels of El Michels Affair. The film, directed by Daniel Serafini-Sauli and starring Luke Kirby, premiered at the Tribeca Festival.

== Discography ==
Albums

Title	Album details
Easy to Love.	Released 2008; Independent
The Appetizer	Released 2010; Independent
Easy to Love (Deluxe Japanese Edition)	Released September 2011; Tower Records Japan
Easy to Love Deluxe Edition (North America)	Released September 2011
High Heels & Sneakers	Released May 7, 2013
Wonderland	Released: February 10, 2015
Better	Released August 2, 2019
Joy, A Holiday Pack	Released November 8, 2019
Paramount	Released November 18, 2022
At Home	Released July 11, 2025

Singles

Title	Song Details
"Boy in the Window"	Released 2010; SoulTracks Song Competition Winner; Independent Music Award
"Christmas Won't Do Without You"	Released 2010
"What You won't Do for Love"	Released October 2011; A 7" vinyl for Japan Earthquake & Tsunami Relief Fund
"Daydreaming"	Released 2012
"From the Get Go"	Released 2013
"Lead Me with Your Light"	Released 2013
"Wonderland"	Released 2015
"Joy Somewhere"	Released 2022
"Two Can Play"	Released 2022
"Not In the Mood"	Released 2022
"Love You More” (At Home)	Released 2024
"Joy Somewhere” (At Home)	Released 2024
"Two Can Play” (At Home)	Released 2024
"Dean Martin” (At Home)	Released 2024
"Simple Love” (At Home)	Released 2025
"Not In the Mood” (At Home)	Released 2025
