= Renton School District =

Public school district headquartered in Renton, Washington, USA

Coordinates: 47°28′27″N 122°13′14″W

Renton School District 403 is a public school district headquartered in Renton, Washington, USA.

The district boundaries include the vast majority of Renton, all of Bryn Mawr-Skyway, and portions of the adjacent cities and communities of Bellevue, East Renton Highlands, Fairwood, Kent, Newcastle, SeaTac, and Tukwila.

On October 1 of the 2017-2018 school year, the district has an enrollment of 16,336 students.

== Schools ==
=== High schools ===
- Albert Talley Sr. High School
- Hazen High School
- Lindbergh High School
- Renton High School

=== Middle schools ===
- Dimmitt Middle School
- McKnight Middle School
- Nelsen Middle School
- Risdon Middle School

=== Elementary schools ===
- Benson Hill Elementary
- Bryn Mawr Elementary
- Campbell Hill Elementary
- Cascade Elementary
- Hazelwood Elementary
- Highlands Elementary
- Hilltop Heritage Elementary
- Honeydew Elementary
- Kennydale Elementary
- Lakeridge Elementary
- Maplewood Heights Elementary
- Renton Park Elementary
- Sartori Elementary
- Sierra Heights Elementary
- Talbot Hill Elementary
- Tiffany Park Elementary

=== Other schools ===
- Meadow Crest Early Learning Center
- Griffin Home (6-12)
- Renton Academy (K-12)
- Sartori Education Center
- Virtual High School
- HOME Program

== Renton Memorial Stadium ==
Renton Memorial Stadium is owned and operated by the district for use by its high schools and middle schools. Renton Memorial is used for High school Football, Track and Field, and soccer matches. It is also used at times for Middle School Track meets. It is located at 405 Logan Avenue N. in Renton, near Renton High School and includes an all-weather artificial turf field surrounded by an all-weather track. The facility has covered seating for 5,500 and parking for 1,000 vehicles. The stadium was constructed in 1948 and in 2011 a $7 million renovation project was undertaken. The new design calls for a lighting system with adjustable lights that can illuminate the stands in the various colors of the schools that use the facility as their home field.

== Staff ==
Damien Pattenaude is the superintendent of the Renton School District, starting July 1, 2017.
