= Renton High School =

Coordinates: 47°28′58″N 122°12′42″W

Location
- 400 South Second Street; Renton, Washington 98057; United States

Information
- Type: Free public
- Motto: Pride. Tradition. Excellence.
- Established: 1911
- School district: Renton School District
- Principal: Andrew (Drew) O'Connell
- Teaching staff: 58.25 (FTE)
- Grades: 9–12
- Enrollment: 1,250 (2023–2024)
- Student to teacher ratio: 21.46
- Campus type: Urban
- Colors: Red and white
- Mascot: Redhawks
- Website: rentonhs.rentonschools.us

Renton High School is a public secondary school (grades 9–12) in downtown Renton, Washington, United States, about 10 miles southeast of downtown Seattle. Founded in 1911, it is the oldest high school in the Renton School District.

== History ==
The original Renton High School was built in March 1911 on land originally owned by the Duwamish Indian Tribe, at a cost of $65,000. The three-story brick building, featuring a bell tower that rang out every half hour, stood on the location of the east wing of the current building. The school stood on wooden pilings, which started to rot when Lake Washington was lowered owing to the building of the ship canal. The timbers cracked and the crowded building sank a few inches during the 1923 graduation ceremonies. It was replaced by a larger school in March 1932. In 1941, the old building was torn down and a new addition built near the current building. The school was remodeled in 1969.

In April 1998, Renton voters approved a levy to renovate the high school. Funds were collected from private donors to expand the project to turn the school's auditorium into a performing arts center, at an estimated additional cost of $1.5 million. The City of Renton appropriated another $400,000 for the project. The naming rights were secured by IKEA for $500,000 and construction began in June 2002. The shared-use facility, known as the Renton Community IKEA Performing Arts Center, was completed in June 2003.

When the school first opened, there were only 43 students: 17 freshmen, 19 sophomores, three juniors, and the four seniors who made up the first graduating class in May 1911. By comparison, the largest graduating class—in 1965, when Renton was still the only high school in the district—comprised 809 seniors.

The nickname "Indians" was adopted in honor of Henry Moses, who from 1916 through 1920 was the school's sole Native American basketball player. Moses was the last chief of the Duwamish tribe, and a great grandnephew of Chief Sealth, for whom Seattle was named. Though the name has become controversial in recent years, Moses' widow and the Duwamish Tribe have asked Renton to retain the name to honor Moses' memory. In response to a 1993 resolution by the Washington State Board of Education asking all school districts to review their mascots and logos, the mascot was modified to depict a Pacific Northwest Indian. The words to the school fight song have been modified to say “let's show ‘em” in place of the former “let's scalp ‘em.” In 2021, the mascot was changed to a redhawk.

== Student body ==
As of December 2011 there were 1,256 students enrolled. The school has a diverse student body, with only 31.6% of the students (as of fall 2011) identified as Caucasian or White. Percentages for other groups: Black or African American 35.2%, Asian 30.3%, American Indian or Alaska Native .9%, Hispanic or Latino 15.7%, Hawaiian or Pacific Islander .5%, and multiracial .9%.

== Academics ==
Renton High School offers a full range of academic subjects. Programs for the 2007–2008 school year included mathematics, language arts, social studies, science, physical education, business, computers, art, drama, music, vocational/technology education, foreign language, and family and consumer sciences. Select Advanced placement courses are offered.

Renton High School is also an International Baccalaureate (IB) World School. Renton High School has been an IB School since February 2014.

== Athletics ==
Renton is a member of the Sound Division of the South Puget Sound League in the WIAA, as of the 2016–17 school year. Renton was previously a member of the King Division of the Seamount League. The Indians compete interscholastically in football, golf, volleyball, cross country, swimming, soccer, basketball, wrestling, gymnastics, baseball, softball, tennis, and track.

Home football and soccer games, as well as track and field events, are held at Renton Memorial Stadium, a few blocks to the north of the school. The stadium is shared with the district's other high schools.

== Notable alumni ==
- Karel Shook, child actor in the Seattle Repertory Theater, ballet dancer, teacher, internationally renowned ballet master, author, and co-founder of the Dance Theater of Harlem
- Sally Jewell, CEO of Recreational Equipment, Inc. (REI), United States Secretary of the Interior under Obama administration
- Val Caniparoli, internationally renowned ballet dancer and choreographer, who has created over 100 works, many of which have been performed all over the world. His dance career was with San Francisco Ballet. He has created choreographed works for the theater, opera, television, and film.
- Elaine Miles, actress, Northern Exposure TV Series 1990–1995
- Mark Prothero, best known as the lead defense attorney for Green River killer Gary Ridgway, was a state champion swimmer as a senior at Renton in 1974. He went on to compete at the University of Washington for four years and qualified for the 1976 U.S. Olympic Trials.
- George Reed, member of the class of 1959, and Canadian Football Hall of Fame fullback. Reed was voted the second best CFL player of all time in a 2006 poll. He has been recognized as a member of the Washington State Sports Hall of Fame.
- Aretha Thurmond, three-time Olympic discus thrower and member of the class of 1994
- Clarence "Clancy" Williams, class of 1961, played in the NFL for eight seasons with the Los Angeles Rams
- Patty Van Wolvelaere, Olympic hurdler (1968 and 1972)
