= Kent School District =

School district in King County, Washington

Address
- 12033 SE 256th St Kent, Washington, 98031; United States
- Coordinates: 47°22′16″N 122°10′45″W

District information
- Type: Public
- Motto: EQUITY EXCELLENCE COMMUNITY
- Superintendent: Israel Vela
- School board: Meghin Margel; Awale Farah; Tim Clark; Donald Cook; Andy Song
- Chair of the board: Meghin Margel
- Schools: Elementary 29; Middle 7 High 4 Other 3
- Budget: $577,466,898.97 (2022-2023)
- NCES District ID: 5303960

Students and staff
- Enrollment: 24,983
- Teachers: 1,621 (2023-24)
- Staff: 3,861 (2022-2023)

Other information
- Website: www.kent.k12.wa.us

The Kent School District #415 is a public school district in the U.S. state of Washington, headquartered in Kent.

Covering 73 square miles (190 km^{2}), the Kent School District has 44 schools (29 elementary schools, 7 middle schools, 2 academy schools, and 4 high schools). With 26,891 enrolled students, it is the 4th largest school district in the state of Washington. The district employs 3,389 staff members, of whom 1,687 are teachers.

In the mid-2000s, the school district completed a transition from junior high schools to middle schools. The 2004–2005 school year was the first year the ninth grade was at the high school level.

== District boundary ==
The district includes a large area of Kent, a significant portion of unincorporated King County, all of Covington, and portions of Auburn, Black Diamond, Fairwood, Lake Morton-Berrydale, Lakeland North, Maple Heights-Lake Desire, Maple Valley, Renton, SeaTac, and Tukwila.

== Schools ==
High schools (grades 9–12)
School	Location	Established	Enrollment	Mascot	WIAA classification
Kent-Meridian	Kent	1951	2,352	Royals	4A
Kentlake	Kent	1998	1,905	Falcons	4A
Kentridge	Kent	1968	2,307	Chargers	4A
Kentwood	Covington	1982	2,254	Conquerors	4A

Academy schools
School	Grade levels	Established	Enrollment	Mascot
Kent Laboratory Academy	3–12	1997	314	Griffin
Kent Tech Academy	7–12	2005	332	Tech

Middle schools (grades 6–8)
School	Location	Established	Enrollment	Mascot
Canyon Ridge	Kent	2023	790	Cougars
Cedar Heights	Covington		837	Timberwolves
Mattson	Covington		667	Mustangs
Meeker	Renton		654	Pioneers
Meridian	Kent		711	Monarchs
Mill Creek	Kent		775	Bulldogs
Northwood	Renton		619	Jaguars

=== Elementary schools ===
Grades K-5

- Carriage Crest, located in Renton
- Cedar Valley, located in Covington
- Covington, located in Covington
- Crestwood, located in Covington
- East Hill
- Emerald Park
- Fairwood, located in Renton
- George T. Daniel
- Glenridge
- Grass Lake
- Horizon
- Jenkins Creek, located in Covington
- Kent
- Lake Youngs
- Martin Sortun
- Meadow Ridge
- Meridian
- Millennium
- Neely-O'Brien
- Panther Lake
- Park Orchard
- Pine Tree
- Ridgewood, located in Renton
- River Ridge
- Sawyer Woods, located in Black Diamond
- Scenic Hill
- Soos Creek
- Springbrook
- Sunrise

== Demographics ==
For the 2013–2014 school year there were 27,484 students. 52.4% were male 47.6% were female. The racial makeup was 37.8% Caucasian, 20.9% Hispanic, 17.3% Asian/Pacific Islander, 12.2% African American and 0.6% American Indian.

== Lawsuits ==
=== Mark Iversen vs. Kent School District ===
On July 23, 1997, the American Civil Liberties Union of Washington filed a lawsuit against the Kent School District and five administrators on behalf of a former student, Mark Iversen. The suit alleged that the Kent School District and the administration failed to protect Iversen against anti-gay harassment. Also named in the suit were Superintendent Jim Hager, Assistant Superintendent Gwen Dupree, Principal Doug Boushey (Kent Junior High), Ben Dillard (Kent-Meridian High School) and Tom Watson (Kentwood High). The school district denied the allegations.

In the suit, Iversen claimed that he was harassed from the 7th grade at Kent Junior High up to high school at Kent-Meridian. He left Kent-Meridian to attend Kentwood believing things would change, but they did not. Other incidents include:

- He was pushed into lockers with a broomstick and called "fag" while two teachers were unresponsive.
- An instructor stated to Iversen, "I already have 20 girls in my class. I don't need another."
- A classmate slammed a handwritten note on Iversen's chest threatening "You're dead fag."
- A teacher publicly questioned whether Iversen was qualified to give blood based on the perception that Iversen was gay.
- On numerous occasions, when Iversen would fight back verbally, it was Mark who would get into trouble, not the abusers.
- When Iversen reported to a teacher the abuse he had been suffering based on his sexual orientation, the teacher became antagonistic toward him, banned him from her classroom, and failed him.
- On paperwork to transfer schools, the principals signed off to "ongoing verbal and physical harassment."

During the lawsuit, it was alleged by a family friend that he was given a subpoena at their place of employment and then had pictures taken without their permission. A witness for the defense who was still a student alleges that he was taken out of classes during the litigation and given breakfast, lunches and coffees for his participation and cooperation. A former boyfriend, who was also called to be a defense witness, claims the district attorneys sent him flowers and gifts for his cooperation, but when it was discovered he and Iversen were back together shortly before settlement talks and trial, he was dropped as a witness. No confirmation on the truth or fiction has been made.

The lawsuit was settled in 1999 for $40,000.00 and a guarantee from the district that there would be training on the subject of anti-gay harassment. The district had refused to add sexual orientation to their harassment policy, stating that their current policy has enough explanation. On 11 September 2002, the district adopted a new policy from RCW 9A.36.080(3) that does include the term "sexual orientation."

There have been numerous stories since the settlement (the most recent occurring in September 2005) about ongoing harassment with students who seek help but the district still ignores them. The Kent School District has been acknowledged nationally for their efforts to combat racial discrimination and diversity for minorities.

=== Nick Emmett vs. Kent School District ===
In 2000, student Nick Emmett of Kentlake High School published a website on his private America Online account that depicted students and teachers being voted on who would die. Students in the school knew about the site and many encouraged the participation. Many wanted to be voted as the next “victim” however staff were not amused and demanded Emmett close the website. Many students were suspended and the ACLU took on the case.

It was ruled that the school district could not punish students for their freedom of speech outside of school and was told it could do nothing about it. The site has since been removed.

=== NAACP vs. Kent School District ===
On November 5, 2004, the Seattle branch of the NAACP filed suit against the Kent School District on behalf of 13 families, alleging that district security officers used excessive force against 15 black students.

The suit, filed in King County Superior Court, names the Kent School District, superintendent Barbara Grohe and school security officer Gayle Mangino as defendants.

In the suit, the families say district security officers used metal handcuffs to restrain students, threw them against lockers or on the floor, pulled their hair or used painful pressure holds to force students to comply. The suit also alleges black students were disciplined at a disproportionate rate than other students.

The families also accuse Grohe of negligence, and say she failed to properly supervise district security officers.

Kent School District spokeswoman Becky Hanks said district administrators had not had a chance to thoroughly review the lawsuit, but said the suit was without merit.

The lawsuit was dismissed in May 2005.

=== Students at Kentridge High School vs. Kent School District ===
In April 2003, students at Kentridge High School south of Seattle filed a lawsuit against their school after being blocked from starting a Bible club. The students say their First Amendment rights had been violated by the school district.

September 2002, the United States Court of Appeals for the Ninth Circuit confirmed that Bible clubs are allowed to seek ASB sponsorship as any other club may lawfully do, be it Chess club or Muslim club. The court made this decision on the basis that it was a government exclusion of beliefs when the Bethel School District in Spanaway, Washington denied students the option of peacefully organizing outside of school hours a few years ago.

== Teacher strike ==
On August 26, 2009, teachers in the school district went on strike, for reasons including teacher and student rights and less meetings so teachers can spend more time helping their students. Out of 1,700 teachers, 1,500, 86%, agreed on a strike, while 14% did not.

== Lockdowns at schools ==
The schools in the district has been on lockdown multiple times, in 2024 and 2025. Some reasons involve security threats, reports of weapons, intruder, and external threats near the school. Below this is a list of lockdowns that happened between those 2 specific years.

== Rivalries ==
There are many rivalries between schools in such a large district, some more competitive than others.

- Kentwood High School vs Kentridge High School (football)
- Kentlake High School vs Tahoma High School (football)
- Kent-Meridian High School vs Kentridge High School (football)

The schools are located mere miles from each other and the teams generally have very competitive games.

- Kentwood High School vs Kentlake High School (wrestling)

An annual event known as the Cov-Town Throwdown

- Kentlake High School vs Kentwood High School (volleyball)

Continuously battling for the league title

- Northwood Middle School vs Meeker Middle School (basketball, football, wrestling)
