= Nelsen Middle School =

Coordinates: 47°27′29″N 122°11′54″W

- Renton, Washington; United States

Information
- Type: Public Middle School
- School district: Renton School District
- Principal: Stephen Rencher
- Grades: 6-8
- Enrollment: 1,002 (2016-17)
- Colors: purple, yellow, and white
- Athletics: wrestling, volleyball, girls and boys soccer, girls and boys basketball, track, flag football
- Mascot: Hawk
- Website: nelsen.rentonschools.us

Nelsen Middle School, is located in Renton, Washington, USA, a suburb of Seattle, and is in Renton School District 403. It is a middle school that educates around 1,010 students in grades 6–8.

In the past few years Nelsen has completed a major remodel with peaked roofs and a peaked entry arch complementing its original boxy building shapes.

== Students ==
It serves 6th through 8th graders from the south-east hill of Renton. Students feed from Benson Hill, Cascade, Renton Park, Talbot Hill and Tiffany Park elementary schools. About half of the students from Talbot Hill elementary school also feeds into Nelsen. Nelsen Middle School graduates continue on to Lindbergh High School.

In 2006, 47% of students were eligible for free or reduced lunch. 25% of students were Asian American, 17% were African American, 41% were European American, 10% Hispanic, and 7% other. The school mascot, formerly "Braves" are now the "Hawks".

== Notable faculty ==
Steven Turner was named the Washington Middle Level Science Teacher of the Year by the Washington Science Teachers Association in October 2000.

Brian Hoskins, Vocal Music, won a Renton Chamber of Commerce Ahead of the Class, Excellence In Education Award in May 2006.

== Awards and grants ==
- Nelsen received a technology grant from the Gates Foundation in January 1996.
- Kristen Wong won one of the individual awards in the statewide MathCounts competition in March 1996 and the school came third in the team competition.
