= Too Fat for 15: Fighting Back =

- Genre: Reality
- Country of origin: United States
- Original language: English
- No. of seasons: 2
- No. of episodes: 22

Production
- Executive producers: Beverley Doyle; Katie Buchanan; Paul Stead; Renee Simon; Ruth Rafidi; Sally Miles
- Production companies: Daisybeck Productions; Passion Distribution

Original release
- Network: Style
- Release: August 9, 2010 – December 21, 2011

Too Fat for 15: Fighting Back is an American reality television series on Style. The series debuted on August 9, 2010. The second season premiered on March 7, 2011. The mid-season finale aired on April 25, 2011. The second half of season 2 premiered on October 19, 2011.

== Premise ==
The series shares the stories of various overweight teenagers who are enrolled at Wellspring Academies, and looks at their quest to lose weight.

== Cast ==
=== Students ===
- Tanisha Mitchell (Harrod) - Age 18 - Suitland, Maryland
- Terinna Cypress - Age 18 - Clewiston, Florida
- Miranda Nichols - Age 18 - Oakton, Virginia
- Emily Hodge - Age 12 - Raleigh, North Carolina
- Scotty Basso - Age 13 - Athens, Illinois
- Rachel Qualley - Age 14 - Groton, Connecticut
- Carsyn Nash - Age 18 - Warrenton, Virginia
- Hayley Bailiff - Age 17 - Warren, Michigan
- Caleb Treloar - Age 16 - Tampa, Florida
- Sasha Mignoli - Age 15 - Long Island, New York
- David Smith - Age 13 - Groton, Connecticut
- Lia Yelsky - Age 14 - Montvale, New Jersey
- Alan Kitner - Age 16 - Dallas, Texas
- Ashley Renwick - Age 16 - Whitehorse, Yukon, Canada
- Caroline Contessa - Age 12 - Petersburg, New York
- Mackenzie Wood - Age 15 - Mexico Beach, Florida
- Hannah Greatbatch - Age 13 - London, UK

=== Staff of Wellspring Academy ===
- Dr. Daniel Kirschenbaum - Co-Founder
- David Boeke - Executive Director
- Jefferey Rice - Program Director
- Timm Tilson - Program Director
- Billy Porter - Academic Director
- Jesse Oates - Program Supervisor
- John Taylor - Fitness Coach
- Nicole Kaysing - Fitness Coach
- Elizabeth Tilson - Behavioral Coach
- Heather Richardson - Behavioral Coach & Assistant Clinical Director
- Lamar Lewis - Behavioral Coach (season 2)
- Sally Curry - Behavioral Coach (season 1)
- Susan Borgman - Behavioral Coach & Clinical Director
- Crystal Sain - Program Coach
- Hidi Horikoshi - Program Coach
- James Robertson - Program Coach
- Joyce Jones - Program Coach
- Lisa Barros - Program Coach
- Mary Valentine - Program Coach
- Natasha Fischer - Program Coach
- Zach Noble - Program Coach
- Jessi Messner - Program Coach
- Elizabeth Walker - Medical Coordinator
- Mary Chauvin - Medical Coordinator
- Sam Lopez - Nutritionist
- Liz Krieg - Night Warden

== Episodes ==
=== Series overview ===
Season	Episodes	Originally released	
Season	Episodes	First released	Last released
1	8	August 9, 2010	August 29, 2010
2	18	March 7, 2011	December 12, 2011

=== Season 1 (2010) ===
No.	Title	Original release date
1	"The School of Last Resort"	August 9, 2010
2	"Smells Like Teen Angst"	August 16, 2010
3	"Parents' Weekend"	August 23, 2010
4	"Spring Breakout"	August 30, 2010
5	"The Breaking Point"	September 13, 2010
6	"Mayhem and Meltdowns"	September 20, 2010
7	"Trouble at Home"	September 27, 2010
8	"What Happens Next"	October 4, 2010

=== Season 2 (2011) ===
No.	Title	Original release date
1	"No Weigh Out"	March 7, 2011
2	"The Battlefield"	March 14, 2011
3	"Pushed to the Limit"	March 21, 2011
4	"Parental Advisory"	March 28, 2011
5	"Fear and Candy"	April 4, 2011
6	"Feast for Famine"	April 11, 2011
7	"The Food Hangover"	April 18, 2011
8	"Sticks and Stones"	April 25, 2011
9	"Back to Reality"	October 19, 2011
10	"Crashing the Dance"	October 26, 2011
11	"Family Feuds"	November 2, 2011
12	"Anger Ball"	November 9, 2011
13	"Queens of the Road"	November 16, 2011
14	"Into the Wild"	November 23, 2011
15	"Picture Perfect?"	November 30, 2011
16	"The Weight Is Over"	December 7, 2011
17	"No Place Like Home"	December 14, 2011
18	"Tanisha's Amazing Transformation"	December 21, 2011

=== Specials ===
No.	Title	Original release date
0	"Pilot"	September 6, 2009
0	"The Obesity Crisis"	June 27, 2011
Note: This episode was a part of Style's campaign to combat obesity special.

== After filming ==
Tanisha Mitchell (Harrod)- Graduate of Frostburg State University and Howard University School of Law

Carsyn Nash- Professional Mixed Martial Arts fighter, currently a member of Elevation Fight Team

Hayley Bailiff- Graduate of Oakland University, now working in real estate in New York City

John Taylor- Completed doctorate degree at North Central University. Named 2016 New Jersey Charter School Teacher of the Year, and 2022 Varsity Brands National Athletic Director of the Year

Nicole Kaysing- Completed masters degree at Western Carolina University, now an instructor at Western Carolina University
