= John Bronson =

American football player (born 1982)

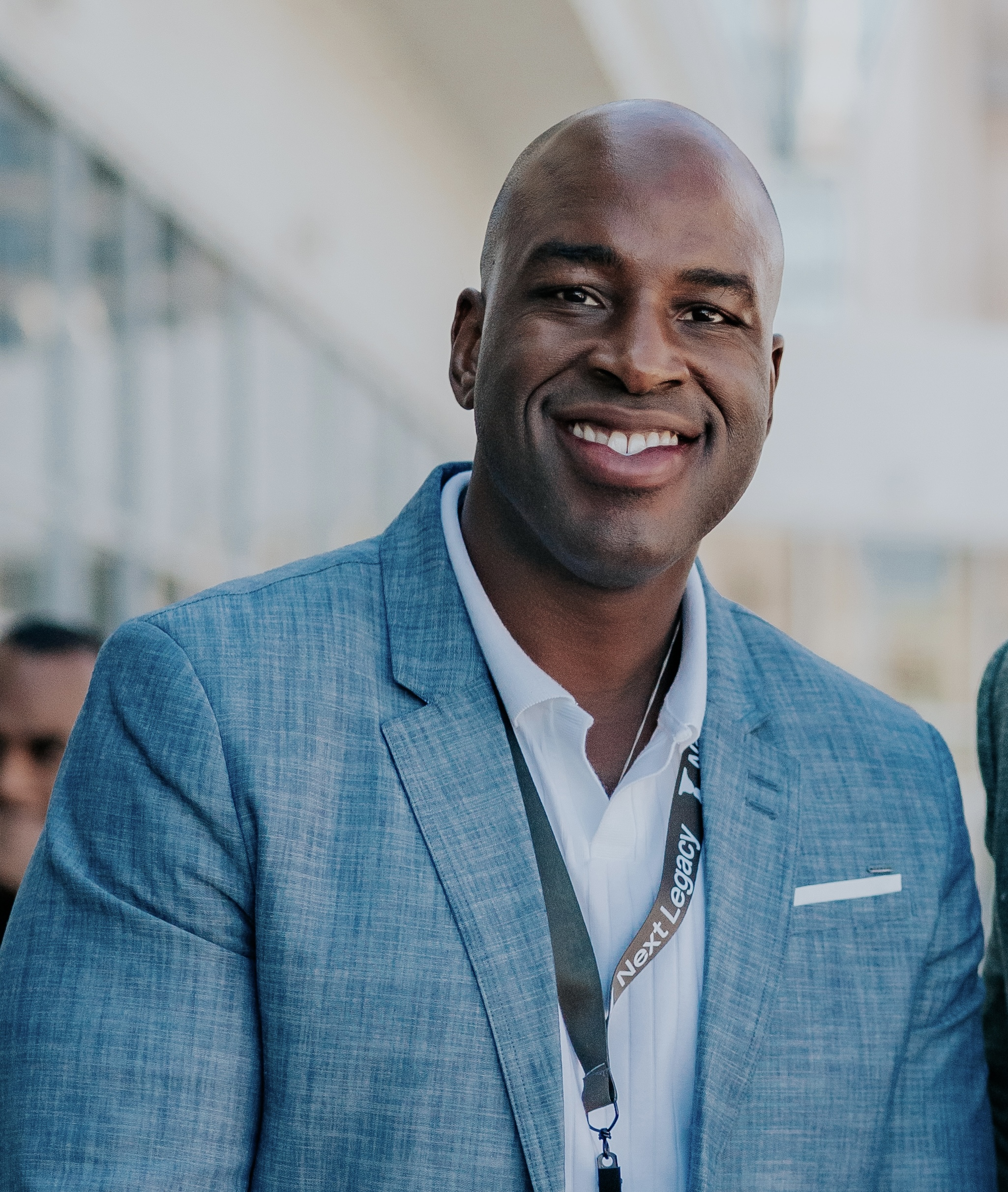

No. 85, 39
- Position: Tight end

Personal information
- Born: July 8, 1982 (age 44); Kent, Washington, U.S.
- Listed height: 6 ft 3 in (1.91 m)
- Listed weight: 275 lb (125 kg)

Career information
- High school: Kent-Meridian
- College: Penn State
- NFL draft: 2005: undrafted

Career history
- Arizona Cardinals (2005–2006)

Career NFL statistics
- Receptions: 1
- Receiving yards: 25
- Stats at Pro Football Reference

Johnathon Lee Bronson (born July 8, 1982) is an American former professional football player who was a tight end for the Arizona Cardinals of the National Football League (NFL). He played college football for the Penn State Nittany Lions.

== Early life ==
Bronson was a three-year letterman in football at Kent-Meridian High School in Kent, Washington. He was a first-team all-conference tight end and defensive end in his senior year there. Bronson finished his career with 48 receptions for 472 yards and two touchdowns. Bronson had 80 tackles with 10 sacks and one interception as a senior. Bronson also excelled at track and field, leading Kent-Meridian to four undefeated dual meet seasons. He finished 7th in the state in the shot put and helped his 4x100 relay team place 6th in the state.

== College career ==
Bronson moved from defensive end to tight end prior to his senior season at Penn State University, and he caught 4 passes for 16 yards and one touchdown. As a junior, he played in 10 games, starting 4 at defensive end finishing the season with 26 tackles and two sacks for the Nittany Lions. Bronson started 11 games at defensive end as a sophomore and had 57 tackles and 4 1/2 sacks. He played in the first 8 games as a redshirt freshman, recording 9 tackles.

He earned a Bachelor of Arts in journalism from Penn State in 2004.

== Professional career ==
Bronson signed with the Arizona Cardinals as an undrafted rookie free agent in 2005. He made the opening day 53-man roster but suffered a knee injury in the season opener at the New York Giants on September 11, 2005, and spent the remainder of the year on injured reserve. Bronson recorded two special teams tackles in that game. The Cardinals released him on August 27, 2007, at the end of the 2007 preseason.

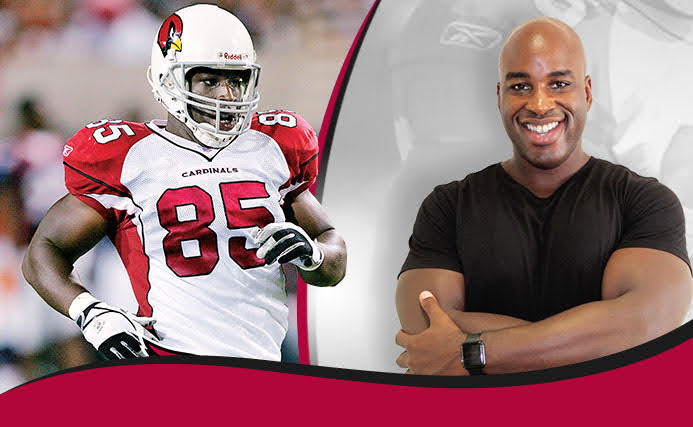
John Bronson Arizona Cardinals

== Later career and personal life ==
After his NFL career, Bronson served as President of the Phoenix Chapter of the NFL Players Association from 2015 to 2017. In 2013, he launched the PACC Pro Network (formerly the Pro Athlete Chamber of Commerce) and is also the principal of John Bronson Marketing and Bronson Enterprises, which span ventures in travel, real estate, and business advisement.

Bronson is the founded Finger Licking Dutch, a stroopwafel company producing authentic caramel waffle cookies from the Netherlands. The brand built nationwide distribution, with customers including TJ Maxx, HomeGoods, the Home Shopping Network, and over 10,000 retail partners such as coffee shops, boutique stores, restaurants, and grocery outlets. Finger Licking Dutch was successfully acquired in 2022.

He also served as executive director of Social4M, followed by his role as chief business officer of Conan Medtech before being enlisted by Armilla Tech, where he now serves as chief growth officer, advisor, and co-owner.

Bronson is married to Anna Bronson, a former corporate attorney and current international yoga advisor. Together, they have a daughter who is actively modeling for various brands and outlets.

Bronson has two younger brothers who also played in the NFL: Demitrius Bronson with the Seattle Seahawks, and Josiah Bronson with the New Orleans Saints, Cleveland Browns, Dallas Cowboys, Miami Dolphins, Indianapolis Colts, UFL’s Memphis Showboats, and currently the Tennessee Titans. His sister was a two-sport collegiate athlete at Morgan State University, excelling in both basketball and track.
