= Spring Lake (King County, Washington) =

Lake in King County, Washington

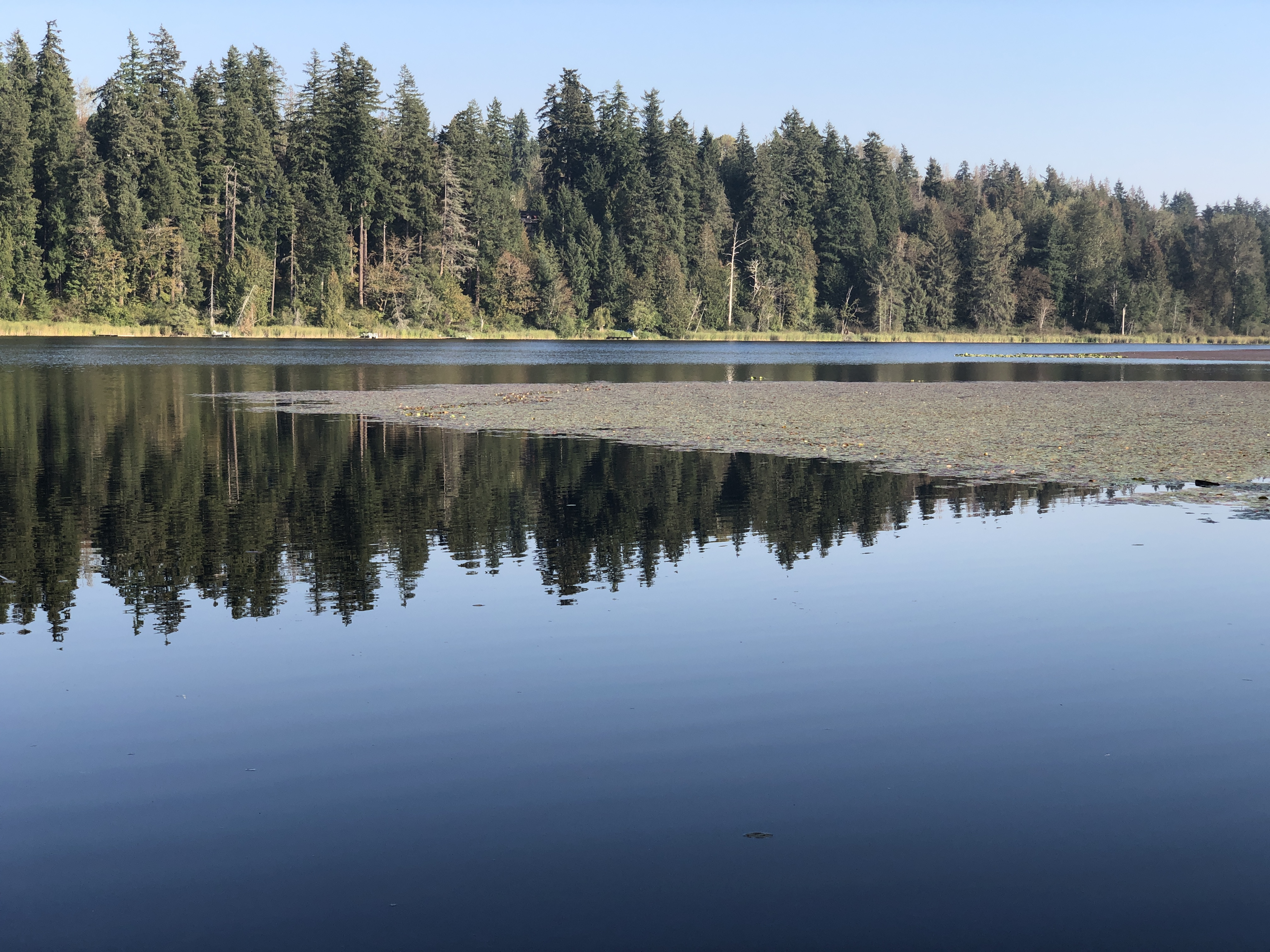
- View of Spring Lake from the public access ramp on the southwest shore

- Location within Washington (state) Location within the United States
- Location: Maple Heights-Lake Desire, Washington, US
- Coordinates: 47°26′11″N 122°05′20″W
- Basin countries: United States
- Surface area: 65.30 acres (26.43 ha)
- Max. depth: 32 ft (9.8 m)
- Surface elevation: 482 ft (147 m)

Spring Lake is located in King County, Washington, United States, in the Maple Heights-Lake Desire census-designated place. It sits next to Spring Lake/Lake Desire Park, on the opposite side of Lake Desire. The lake also has fishing opportunities.

== Description ==
Spring Lake has a 443-acre (179 ha) watershed. It is classified as oligotrophic, and generally has clear water. However, algal growth is high and water quality appears to be decreasing over time. There is a bog located on the western shore of the lake.

Spring Lake has suffered from infestation by aquatic noxious weeds. This problem is compounded by the lake's shallow shoreline area, including the bog, which is an ideal habitat for such plants. The most problematic weed in the lake is Eurasian water milfoil. Water milfoil is capable of forming dense mats, killing native plants and destroying aquatic ecosystems. Other noxious weeds in the lake include the fragrant water lily, purple loosestrife, and yellow flag iris. As of 2010, control of the purple loosestrife and fragrant water lilies has been largely successful. Water milfoil continues to be a serious problem.

The lake is stocked with thousands of rainbow trout annually by the Washington Department of Fish and Wildlife. Brown bullhead, largemouth bass, and yellow perch are naturally present in the lake as well. Shore access is limited to a single narrow ramp on the southwest shore of the lake.

== Spring Lake/Lake Desire Park ==
Spring Lake is located within a large network of parks and trails. Spring Lake/Lake Desire Park is a 370-acre (150 ha) park between Spring Lake and Lake Desire. Echo Peak is an 900-foot (270 m) summit between the two lakes, offering views of both. There are more than 3 miles (4.8 km) of trails between the lakes, and far more in the surrounding parks. The site was once industrial timberlands, but is now managed by King County Parks.
