= Kentlake High School =

Location
- 21401 SE Falcon Way; Kent, Washington; United States; 47°19′53″N 122°03′26″W

Information
- Type: Public high school
- Motto: Stilus Fortior Gladio (Latin: The pen is mightier than the sword)
- Established: 1997
- School district: Kent School District
- Principal: Heidi Maurer
- Teaching staff: 77.33 (FTE)
- Grades: 9–12
- Enrollment: 1,551 (2023–2024)
- Student to teacher ratio: 20.06
- Campus: Exurban
- Colors: Cardinal, Silver, Black, White
- Mascot: Falcon
- Newspaper: The Falcon Flyer
- Website: kent.k12.wa.us/o/khs

Kentlake High School is a public high school with more than 1,600 students in Kent, Washington, United States. It is part of the Kent School District.

== History ==
Kentlake High School was designed by the architectural firm Burr Lawrence Rising and was built in 1997. Built to accommodate 1600 students, the brick-exterior, two-story facility has 232,000 square feet (21,600 m^{2}) for student use. Under a cooperative agreement with King County Parks, an adjacent 10-acre (40,000 m^{2}) site provides additional fields for Kentlake's athletic programs.

Kentlake welcomed its first student body, the classes of 1999 and 2000 in grades 10 and 11, when it opened on September 2, 1997. Kentlake opened to grades 9–12 during the 2004–2005 school years. During the 2010–2011 school year, Dr. Joe Potts, former assistant principal of Kentwood High School, replaced Diana Pratt as the principal of Kentlake. The replacement was followed with the hiring of two assistant principals: Dylan Smith and Jordanne Nevin.

== Academics ==
Kentlake High School offers several Advanced Placement (AP) courses to the students. Those courses include Art, Literature, Language, Calculus (AB), Calculus (BC), Statistics, Biology, Chemistry, Environmental Science, Physics, Oceanography, Government and Politics, and Psychology an even subjects like automobile mechanics and 3D design/printing.

In addition to AP courses, Kentlake also offers students several University of Washington courses: UW Composition, UW Literature, UW Comparative Lit, UW U.S. History, UW Biology: Brain & Addiction, UW Oceanography, UW Pre-Calculus, and UW Foundations in Information Technology. As of 2017, UW Astronomy is no longer offered.

Language courses offered at Kentlake include Polish, Japanese, French, Spanish, German, Latin, Icelandic, Finnish, Mandarin, Thai, Vietnamese, and American Sign Language.

== Clubs and activities ==
Kentlake offers a variety of clubs and activities to their students, including:

- ASL/Hand up Club
- DECA
- Drama
- Falcon Flyer (school newspaper)
- Falcon Gourmet
- Film Club
- French Club
- Honor Society
- Japan Club
- Key Club
- Minecraft Club
- Multi-cultural Club
- Speech & Debate
- Photo/Video club

== Athletics ==
Kentlake participates in the WIAA 3A/4A division. They have been part of the Cascade Division of the North Puget Sound League since the 2016–2017 school year.

Their volleyball team has won the 4A state championships three times: in 2000, 2001, and 2002. KL volleyball also reached the state tournament in 2005, 2006, 2007, and 2026

The fast-pitch softball team has made it to the quarter-finals six times, the semifinals three times, and to the state championship once.

Kentlake's baseball team reached the state championship in 2008 and won 2nd in 4a State in 2017.

Kentlake's varsity girls soccer team made it to the state tournament in 2011 and 2023.

Kentlake's girls basketball team reached the state tournament in 2007.

Kentlake's girls flag football team made it to the state tournament in 2024, 2025 & 2026.

Kentlake's dance team won 1st at state in the dance category in 2026.

Boys

- Football
- Cross Country
- Golf
- Basketball
- Swim and Dive
- Wrestling
- Baseball
- Tennis
- Track and Field
- Soccer
- Judo

Girls

- Volleyball
- Cross Country
- Swim and Dive
- Golf
- Soccer
- Gymnastics
- Basketball
- Wrestling
- Softball
- Track and Field
- Tennis
- Judo
- Cheerleading
- Dance Team
- Flag Football

== Notable alumni ==
- Courtney Thompson, University of Washington volleyball player, member of the NCAA 2005 championship team, United States women's national volleyball team, won a silver medal at the 2012 Olympics and a bronze medal at the 2016 Olympics
- Tess Henley, singer-songwriter, pianist, and soul music performer
- Jake Larson, American World War II veteran and TikToker

== Band accomplishments ==
In just its second year of existence, Kentlake's Jazz Ensemble took top honors in the Heritage New Orleans Jazz Festival. In 1999, the Jazz Ensemble finished 1st in its classification at the Reno Jazz Festival and 3rd at the Lionel Hampton Jazz Festival. That same year, the group undertook the challenge of performing the Ellington/Strayhorn “Jazz Nutcracker Suite” in its entirety and committed to making it an annual event by performing it again during the subsequent holiday seasons. That annual performance has since evolved into the highly popular Jingle Jazz Concert. One of the benefits of being a new high school in these times is having up-to-date technology, which includes digital recording capabilities. The jazz ensemble students have recorded, engineered, and produced a composite CD of the 1998-2000 and 2004 Kentlake Jazz Ensembles, and even contributed the cover art as well. Just this week the Kentlake High School Jazz Ensemble has been declared the winner (by taped audition) of the “Big Bad Voodoo Daddy Contest”, sponsored by Selmer Music Co., resulting in a performance by the recording group at Kentlake on March 21, 2001. To top it off, the 2001 band was selected as one of the top 15 groups nationally and performed at the prestigious Essentially Ellington Festival in New York City. In 2004 the Jazz Ensemble took Grand Sweepstakes honors at the New Orleans Heritage Festival, which is also attended in 2010.

In 2007, the band took top honors at the Boise State Gene Harris Jazz Festival and twice has been selected as the top band at the University of Montana Buddy DeFranco Jazz Festival (2009 and 2012). Several band alumni have moved into the professional music scene as performers, recording industry workers, and music teachers.

Kentlake's former band Director, Chuck Stowell who is a graduate of the University of Washington, retired after the 2014 school year. Jonathan Urmenita replaced him. Urmenita is a graduate of Washington State University.

== Controversies ==
In February 2000 Chief Judge John Coughenour ordered the school to reinstate a student who had been suspended for creating an unofficial school website at home stating the school did not have the authority to punish students for exercising their freedom of speech outside of school.

In March 2011, a Kentlake High School teacher, Barbara Anderson, was charged with felony sexual misconduct with a minor after she was accused of having sex with a 17-year-old boy.

On April 3, 2012, two students were arrested by the Kent Police Department after the administration reported that a loaded gun had been brought to school. According to the letter passed out by the administration, no harm was originally intended. A small handgun was confiscated, and two students have been expelled.

In 2023, another teacher, Jesse Webb, was charged for inappropriate conduct with a 15-year-old student.
