= Kent Crusaders (rugby union) =

The Kent Crusaders Rugby Football Club fields high school boys' and girls' teams in Kent, Washington, with close to 100 players from high schools and junior high schools in the Kent and Tahoma school districts. The players' ages range from 14 to 19 years old. The rugby season runs from February through May.

== National Recognition ==
The Crusaders' performance at the local and national level by both the boys and girls. Teams have received recognition in prominent national rugby publications that said, "... the Crusaders have established themselves as one of the premier high school rugby programs in the country." No other program in the country has repeatedly placed both boys' and girls' high school teams in the national championships. In the 2013 season, the girls' team won 2nd place in the national high school girls' rugby tournament in Wisconsin only losing one game to Fallbrook Highschool.

== High School Boys' Team Highlights ==
Since its inception in 1991, the Kent Crusaders boys' team has won numerous Championships, including seven (7) Pacific Northwest Championships and playing for the National Championship almost every year since 1993. The teams have toured the United States, Canada, England, Wales, Ireland France and New Zealand. In November 2013 Trident rugby from New Zealand had a friendly match with the Crusaders.

== High School Girls' Team Highlights ==
The Kent Crusaders girls' team was the first high school girls' rugby team in the nation, established in 1993. They too have gained national status by winning the Washington State Championship every year beginning in 2000. They have also competed in the Nationals tournament every year since 2000 and won the prized national title in 2002. The ladies have toured Canada, New Zealand (2), England, and Wales. In the 2012 season, the girls' team was named 5th in the nation after losing one game and winning two. In 2013 they were named 2nd in the nation, losing to Fallbrook but were the only team to have scored on Fallbrook throughout the tournament.

== Coaching staff ==
The KCRF club is fortunate to have some of the most experienced and skilled rugby coaching staff in the nation. The focus has been teaching the players the game of rugby while instilling a spirit of teamwork, good sportsmanship, academic achievement, and community involvement into these fine young men and women. Rex Norris coaches the girls' team, as well as being an AP Psychology teacher at Kentwood high school, and is the head football coach there as well. Jeremy Torres is the head coach for the boys' team for the 2013 season. He was assistant to Alan Blackstock for the past years. Joining Norris will be Brad Young and joining Torres will be Rienus Hazelman, who has played rugby in America and New Zealand
