= Lake Desire =

Unimproved watershed near Renton, Washington

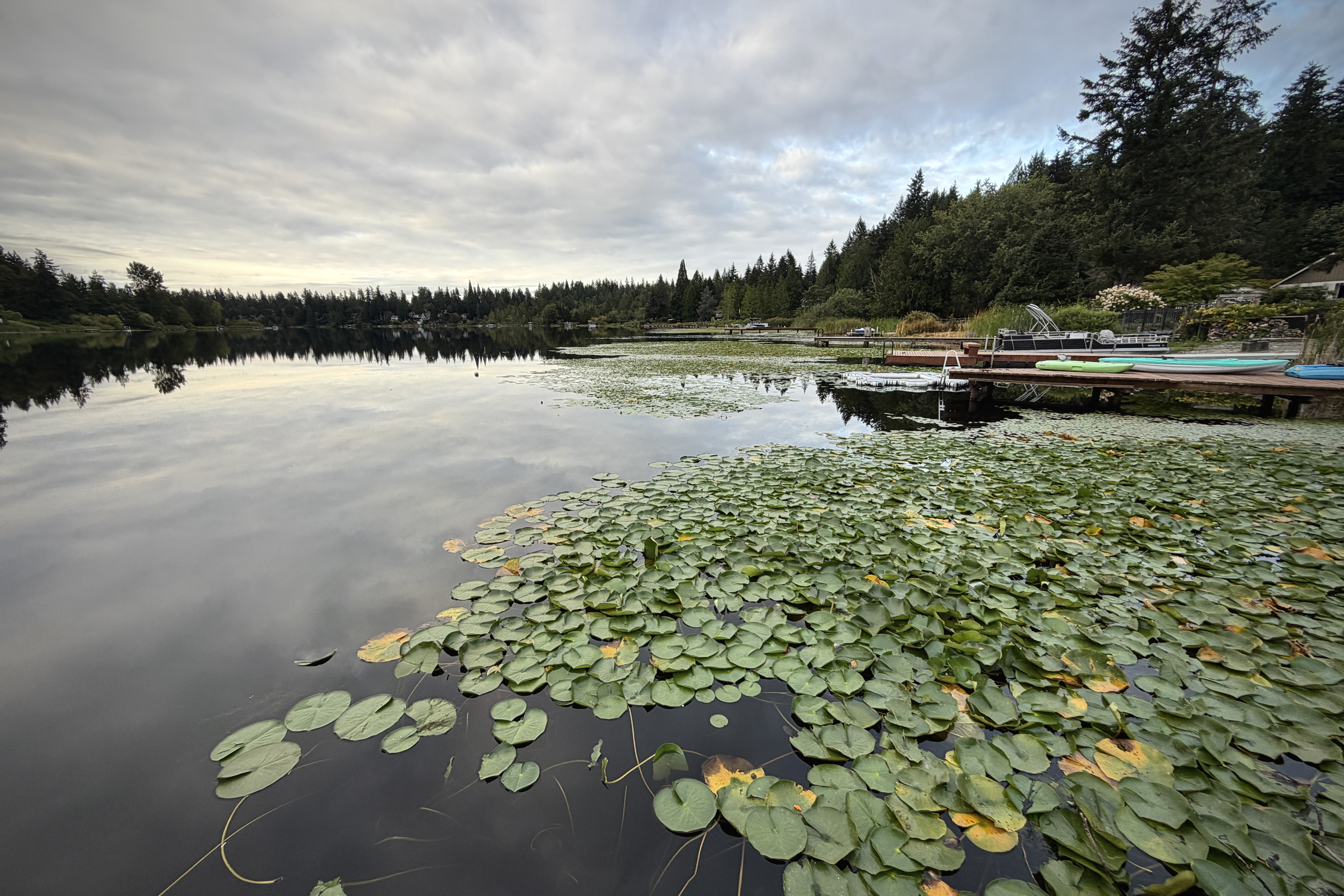

- Location within Washington (state)
- Location: Maple Heights-Lake Desire, King County, Washington
- Coordinates: 47°26′27″N 122°06′24″W
- Basin countries: United States
- Surface area: 80 acres (32 ha)
- Max. depth: 21 ft (6.4 m)
- Surface elevation: 495 ft (151 m)

Lake Desire, also called Echo Lake, is an unimproved watershed 5 miles (8.0 km) southeast of Renton, Washington in the United States. It is a small part of the Maple Heights-Lake Desire, Washington area, 45 minutes east of downtown Seattle. According to King County, it has productive water quality, a maximum depth of 21 feet (6.4 m) and a surface area of approximately 80 acres. A public boat launch and fishing dock is located to the north of the lake but does require a vehicle use permit from the Washington Department of Fish and Wildlife. On the southeast border of the lake, a 382-acre (1.55 km^{2}) forested park and wetland area has been allocated by the Washington Wildlife and Recreation Program (WWRP).

== Recreation ==
- Fishing is managed as a mixed species fishery. Active species include pumpkinseed, largemouth bass, yellow perch, black channel catfish and rainbow trout.
- Mountain biking is allowed around the lake and in the 382-acre (1.55 km^{2}) park.
- Hiking is popular in the 382-acre (1.55 km^{2}) park that connects Lake Desire and Spring Lake. The park includes part of Cedar Mountain with an 880-foot (270 m) elevation according to the Washington Trails Association.
