= Maple Heights-Lake Desire, Washington =

- Census-designated place
- Location of Maple Heights-Lake Desire, Washington
- Coordinates: 47°26′39″N 122°05′50″W
- Country: United States
- State: Washington
- County: King

Area
  - Total: 4.31 sq mi (11.15 km^{2})
  - Land: 4.10 sq mi (10.63 km^{2})
  - Water: 0.20 sq mi (0.52 km^{2})
- Elevation: 771 ft (235 m)

Population (2020)
  - Total: 3,873
  - Density: 943.7/sq mi (364.3/km^{2})
- Time zone: UTC-8 (Pacific (PST))
  - Summer (DST): UTC-7 (PDT)
- FIPS code: 53-43062
- GNIS feature ID: 2408172

Maple Heights-Lake Desire is a census-designated place (CDP) in King County, Washington, United States. At the 2020 census, the population was 3,873.

Based on per capita income, one of the more reliable measures of affluence, Maple Heights-Lake Desire ranks 28th of 522 areas in the state of Washington to be ranked.

== Geography ==
Maple Heights-Lake Desire is located in west-central King County and is bordered to the west by the Fairwood CDP, with which it shares a ZIP code, and to the south by the Shadow Lake CDP. Washington State Route 169, running through the Cedar River valley, forms the northern border, and the eastern boundary follows 196th Avenue SE. The southern border of the CDP is SE Petrovitsky Road. The community is 6 miles (10 km) southeast of Renton and 16 miles (26 km) southeast of downtown Seattle.

According to the United States Census Bureau, the CDP has a total area of 4.3 square miles (11.2 km^{2}), of which 4.1 square miles (10.6 km^{2}) are land and 0.2 square miles (0.5 km^{2}), or 4.68%, are water. Lake Desire is in the western part of the CDP, and Spring Lake is in the east. 896-foot (273 m) Cedar Mountain sits between the two lakes and contains a trail network. The neighborhood of Maple Valley Heights is in the northeast.

== Demographics ==
Historical population
Census	Pop.	Note	%±
2000	2,569		—
2010	3,152		22.7%
2020	3,873		22.9%
U.S. Decennial Census; 1990 2000 2010

Maple Heights-Lake Desire first appeared as a census designated place in the 2000 U.S. census.

=== Racial and ethnic composition ===
Maple Heights-Lake Desire CDP, Washington – Racial and ethnic composition Note: the US Census treats Hispanic/Latino as an ethnic category. This table excludes Latinos from the racial categories and assigns them to a separate category. Hispanics/Latinos may be of any race.
Race / Ethnicity (NH = Non-Hispanic)	Pop 2000	Pop 2010	Pop 2020	% 2000	% 2010	% 2020
White alone (NH)	2,189	2,406	2,452	85.21%	76.33%	63.31%
Black or African American alone (NH)	33	81	119	1.28%	2.57%	3.07%
Native American or Alaska Native alone (NH)	31	18	6	1.21%	0.57%	0.15%
Asian alone (NH)	175	431	732	6.81%	13.67%	18.90%
Native Hawaiian or Pacific Islander alone (NH)	4	6	2	0.16%	0.19%	0.05%
Other race alone (NH)	7	4	29	0.27%	0.13%	0.75%
Mixed race or Multiracial (NH)	60	99	300	2.34%	3.14%	7.75%
Hispanic or Latino (any race)	70	107	233	2.72%	3.39%	6.02%
Total	2,569	3,152	3,873	100.00%	100.00%	100.00%

=== 2000 census ===
As of the census of 2000, there were 2,569 people, 902 households, and 736 families residing in the CDP. The population density was 630.0 people per square mile (243.1/km^{2}). There were 922 housing units at an average density of 226.1/sq mi (87.3/km^{2}). The racial makeup of the CDP was 86.80% White, 1.28% African American, 1.48% Native American, 6.81% Asian, 0.19% Pacific Islander, 0.90% from other races, and 2.53% from two or more races. Hispanic or Latino of any race were 2.72% of the population.

There were 902 households, out of which 37.6% had children under the age of 18 living with them, 72.4% were married couples living together, 5.8% had a female householder with no husband present, and 18.4% were non-families. 13.4% of all households were made up of individuals, and 3.3% had someone living alone who was 65 years of age or older. The average household size was 2.84 and the average family size was 3.11.

In the CDP the population was spread out, with 26.8% under the age of 18, 5.1% from 18 to 24, 30.6% from 25 to 44, 28.9% from 45 to 64, and 8.6% who were 65 years of age or older. The median age was 39 years. For every 100 females there were 104.7 males. For every 100 females age 18 and over, there were 104.1 males.

The median income for a household in the CDP was $75,741, and the median income for a family was $78,848. Males had a median income of $56,761 versus $38,125 for females. The per capita income for the CDP was $33,209. About 0.6% of families and 2.2% of the population were below the poverty line, including 3.0% of those under age 18 and none of those age 65 or over.
