= Kentridge High School =

Location
- 12430 Southeast 208th Street; Kent, Washington 98031; United States; 47°25′09″N 122°10′17″W

Information
- Type: Secondary School
- Motto: It's a Great Day to Be a Charger
- Established: 1968
- School district: Kent School District
- Principal: Christa Ernst
- Teaching staff: 94.80 (FTE)
- Grades: 9–12
- Enrollment: 2,124 (2023-2024)
- Student to teacher ratio: 22.41
- Campus: Suburban
- Colors: Green and Gold
- Mascot: Charlie the Charger
- Nickname: Chargers
- Website: https://kent.k12.wa.us/o/krhs

Kentridge High School is a (senior) high school that is located on 43 acres (170,000 m^{2}) in Kent, Washington, United States. It is the second-oldest and second-largest high school by area (while the largest by population) in the Kent School District. It primarily serves students in the northeastern region of the district.

== Academics ==
Kentridge offers Advanced Placement courses in English Language and Composition, English Literature and Composition, Computer Science, Art, Art History, Calculus (AB and BC), Statistics, Human Geography, US History, US Government and Politics, Biology, Chemistry, Environmental Science, Physics (B), Music Theory, and Psychology. As an alternative to AP classes, Kentridge also offers juniors and seniors Running Start. Languages available for students to take are French, Spanish, Japanese, and American Sign Language (ASL). All of the languages have courses up to the 4th year or 7–8 level. Kentridge's mascot is known as Charlie the Charger, who is displayed as a horse.

== Extracurricular activities ==
=== Athletics ===
Kentridge is a part of the Cascade Division of the North Puget Sound League as of the 2016–17 school year. Previously, it was a part of the North Division in Washington's 4A South Puget Sound League. The school has a lasting rivalry with Kentwood High School.

Recent state championships:

- 1st in 1973 for boys football
- 1st in 1989 for volleyball
- 1st in 1992 for boys basketball
- 1st in 1994 for boys swimming and diving
- 1st in 1995 for boys swimming and diving
- 1st in 2002 for fastpitch softball
- 1st in 2008 for small varsity cheerleading
- 1st in 2017 for girls basketball

== Notable alumni ==
- Ely Allen, NASL player
- Gary Bell Jr., professional basketball player
- Tanner Conner, National Football League player
- Jason Ellis (basketball), former professional basketball player
- Kai Ellis, Canadian Football League player
- Marcus Hahnemann, Major League Soccer player
- Nicole Joraanstad, Olympic Curling Team Member
- David Patton, Major League Baseball player
- Brandon Prideaux, former Major League Soccer player
- Peter Schweizer, writer
- Mason Tobin, Major League Baseball player
- Olivia Van Der Jagt, National Women's Soccer League player
