= Kentwood High School (Washington) =

Public secondary school in Covington, Washington, United States

Coordinates: 47°22′13″N 122°07′14″W

Location
- 25800 164th Ave SE; Covington, Washington 98042; United States

Information
- Type: Public secondary
- Motto: Successfully Preparing All Students For Their Futures
- Established: 1981
- School district: Kent School District
- Principal: Samantha Ketover
- Teaching staff: 82.63 (FTE)
- Grades: 9–12
- Enrollment: 1,995 (2024–2025)
- Student to teacher ratio: 24.14
- Campus: Suburban
- Colors: Silver, black, white and Kelly green
- Mascot: Conqueror
- Affiliation: WIAA 4A Division
- Website: kent.k12.wa.us/o/kwhs

Kentwood High School is a high school in Covington, Washington, United States. Kentwood is one of four high schools in the Kent School District. It serves students in grades 9 through 12 who mainly live in the east central region of the district. Its main feeder schools are Mattson and Meridian Middle Schools.

Kentwood is one of Washington's largest high schools; its enrollment of more than 2,000 students even exceeds the enrollment of most other 4A high schools in the state. Kentwood High School's mascot is the Conquerors, or the "Conks."

== Academics ==
Kentwood High School offers Advanced Placement classes in 2-D Art, 3-D Art, Drawing, English Language & Composition, World History, Human Geography, U.S. History, Psychology, Government & Politics, Calculus AB, Calculus BC, Statistics, and Computer Science A.

Foreign language classes available for students to take are Spanish (4 years), American Sign Language (4 years), and Japanese (4 years). All students are required to take at least 2 years of a foreign language.

In addition, Kentwood High School was also one of 41 schools in the country named a Grammy Signature in 2004 for their Music Program, which included a check for $1000 USD as a donation to the program.

== Sports ==
Kentwood's sports teams compete in the Cascade Division of the North Puget Sound League since the 2016-17 school year.

=== Boys ===
- Football
- Cross Country
- Golf
- Basketball
- Swim and Dive
- Wrestling
- Baseball
- Track and Field
- Soccer
- Judo

=== Girls ===
- Volleyball
- Cross Country
- Swim and Dive
- Golf
- Soccer
- Gymnastics
- Basketball
- Wrestling
- Softball
- Track and Field
- Tennis
- Judo
- Cheerleading
- Dazzlers Dance Team

Kentwood students can also participate in district-wide Kent Crusaders Rugby and Kentwood Water Polo.

Kentwood Football won the Washington State 4A Championship in both 2001 and 2002.

In addition, Kentwood also has a swim team that continues to make excellent progress each year, with a swimmer breaking a state record during the 2018–2019 season.

== Notable alumni ==
- Ernie Conwell (1988–1991) - retired tight end who played for the St. Louis Rams and the New Orleans Saints
- Isis Gee (née Tamara Wimer) (1988–1991) - Polish pop music star
- Matt Hague - MLB player (former member of Toronto Blue Jays 40-man roster)
- Anthony Hamilton - professional MMA fighter in the UFC's Heavyweight Division
- Mike Karney (1996–1999) - fullback for the St. Louis Rams
- Jeremiah Green - drummer for Modest Mouse (See We Were Dead Before the Ship Even Sank)
- Rodney Stuckey (2001–2004) - drafted and played guard for the Detroit Pistons and the Indiana Pacers
- Cam Weaver (1999–2002) - retired soccer forward
- Jeff Dye - comedian/3rd-place finisher on Last Comic Standing
- Stefano Langone (2004–2007) - Season 10 American Idol contestant
- Courtney Vandersloot (2004–2007) - guard for the New York Liberty
- Reese McGuire (2018–) - MLB catcher for the Boston Red Sox
- Lindsey Moore (2006–2009) - guard for the Minnesota Lynx
- Demitrius Bronson - former NFL running back Seattle Seahawks
- Joshua Smith (2006–2010) - NBA player for the Houston Rockets
- The Fung Brothers (Andrew Fung & David Fung) - YouTubers
- Austin Voth - MLB pitcher for the Seattle Mariners
- Taylor Jones - MLB player for the San Francisco Giants
- Mathew Barzal - NHL player for the New York Islanders
