= Riverton, Washington =

- CDP
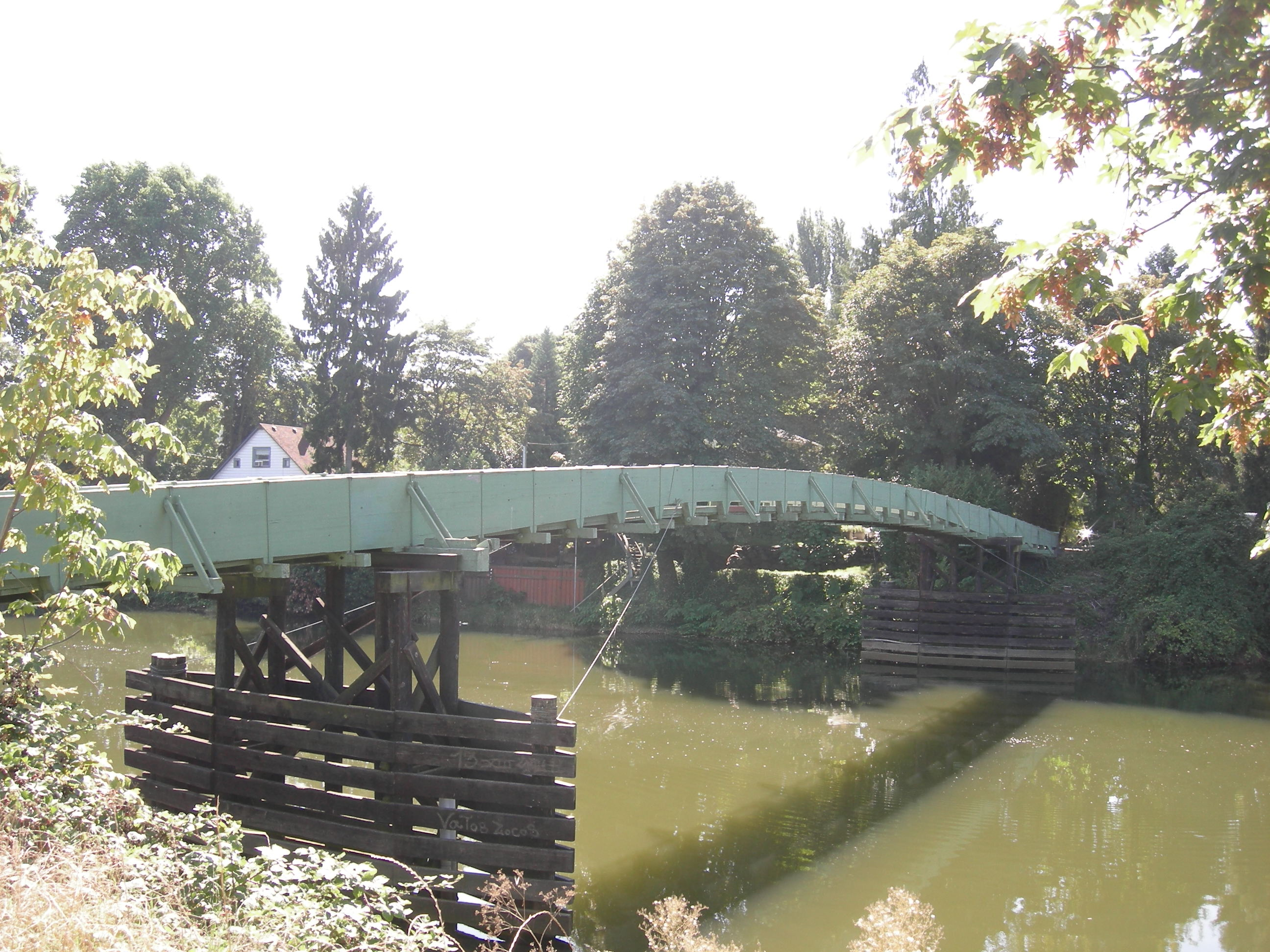
- The 119th Street footbridge over the upper portion of the Duwamish River leading to historic Riverton, seen here from the Allentown side

- Location in Washington and the United States Riverton (the United States)
- Coordinates: 47°29′41″N 122°18′40″W
- Country: United States
- State: Washington
- County: King

Area
  - Total: 1.182 sq mi (3.061 km^{2})
  - Land: 1.182 sq mi (3.061 km^{2})
  - Water: 0 sq mi (0.000 km^{2})
- Elevation: 364 ft (111 m)

Population (2010)
  - Total: 6,407
  - Density: 5,421/sq mi (2,092.9/km^{2})
- Time zone: UTC-8 (Pacific (PST))
  - Summer (DST): UTC-7 (PDT)
- GNIS feature ID: 2585029
- FIPS code: 53-58865

Riverton is a census-designated place (CDP) in King County, Washington, United States. The population was 6,407 at the 2010 census. Riverton was formerly part of the Riverton-Boulevard Park CDP, which was split up for the 2010 census into Riverton and Boulevard Park. In April 2010 the community was annexed by the city of Burien and is no longer a CDP.

Riverton also refers to a neighboring former community in part of what is now Tukwila in the Duwamish River Valley. It was on the left bank of the Duwamish, not far from the location on the right bank of the present-day Tukwila Community Center.

== History ==
Riverton lent its name to an early 20th-century bridge, variously known as the Riverton Draw Bridge, the Riverton Drawspan, and King County Bridge 622-A. Built 1903, the bridge developed a reputation for being rather unsafe. It closed to vehicles 1919, and was demolished 1927. A remnant of the central pier can still be seen in the river as of 2009, visible either from the riverbank or from the 119th St. S. pedestrian bridge or the Allentown Bridge.

== Geography ==
According to the United States Census Bureau, the CDP had a total area of 1.182 square miles (3.06 km^{2}), of which, 1.182 square miles (3.06 km^{2}) of it is land and 0.000 square miles (0 km^{2}) of it (0%) is water.

== Demographics ==
Historical population
Census	Pop.	Note	%±
2010	6,407		—
U.S. Decennial Census; 2000 2010

Riverton first appeared as a census designated place in the 2010 U.S. census formed from part of the deleted Riverton-Boulevard Park CDP.

== Education ==
In 2010, almost all of the CDP was in the Highline School District, while a sliver was in the Tukwila School District.
