= Greyhound (1890 sternwheeler) =

1890 steamboat in United States

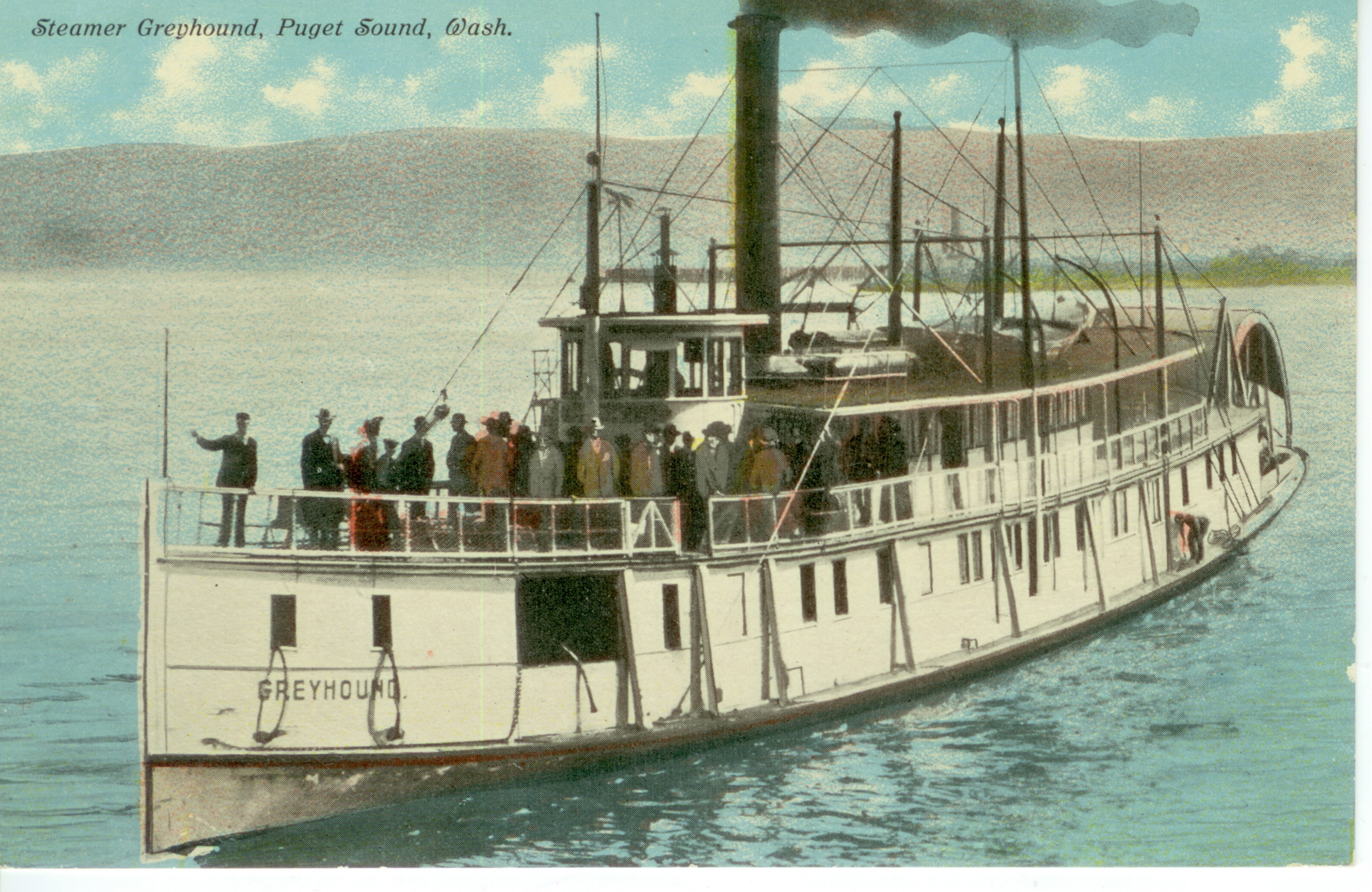
- Greyhound (from an old colorized postcard)

History
- Name: Greyhound
- Route: Puget Sound (several routes)
- Builder: Claude Troup; joiner work by P. Cartsens, Portland, Oregon
- Cost: $15,000
- In service: 1890
- Out of service: about 1915
- Fate: Converted to barge

General characteristics
- Type: inland steamship
- Tonnage: 180.67 gross tonnage; 166.96 registered tonnage
- Length: 140 ft (43 m) length of keel, 165 ft (50 m) overall
- Beam: 18 ft (5 m), 22 ft (7 m) over guards
- Draft: 4.7 ft (1 m)
- Depth: 6.3 ft (2 m) depth of hold
- Decks: two (freight/engines and passenger), hurricane
- Installed power: twin steam engines, 14.5 inch bore by 60" stroke, poppet valves, constructed by Iowa Iron Works, Dubuque, Iowa.
- Propulsion: sternwheel, 21 ft (6 m) , 16 buckets, each bucket 10.5 ft (3 m) long, 20 inches wide, with 22-inch (560 mm) dip.
- Speed: 20 miles per hour maximum

The Greyhound was an express passenger steamer that operated from the 1890s to about 1915 on Puget Sound in Washington, United States. This vessel, commonly known as the Hound, the Pup, or the Dog, was of unusual design, having small upper works, but an enormous sternwheel. Unlike many sternwheelers, she was not intended for a dual role as passenger and freighter, but was purpose-built to carry mostly passengers on express runs.

== Construction ==
Greyhound was built at Portland, Oregon by Capt. Claud Troup (1865–1896) in association with Frank W. Goodhue and others. Greyhound was designed by Claude Troup's brother, James W. Troup, one of the most famous of the steamboat captains. She was long and narrow, and considered by some to be too flimsily built, which turned out to be quite wrong, as the Hound as she was called, proved to be a money-making fast moving boat. The Greyhound was 139.3 feet (42.5 m) long, 18.5 feet (5.6 m) on the beam 6.3 feet (1.9 m) depth. Twin steam engines of 14.5" bore and 72" stroke drove her enormous sternwheel. Mechanical data included: indicated horsepower 400; single boiler, steel firebox built by Willamette Iron Works, Portland, Oregon. Total grate surface 12 square feet (1.1 m^{2}), total heating surface 3,200 square feet (300 m^{2}): fuel consumption: 3/4 of one cord of fir wood

== Operation ==
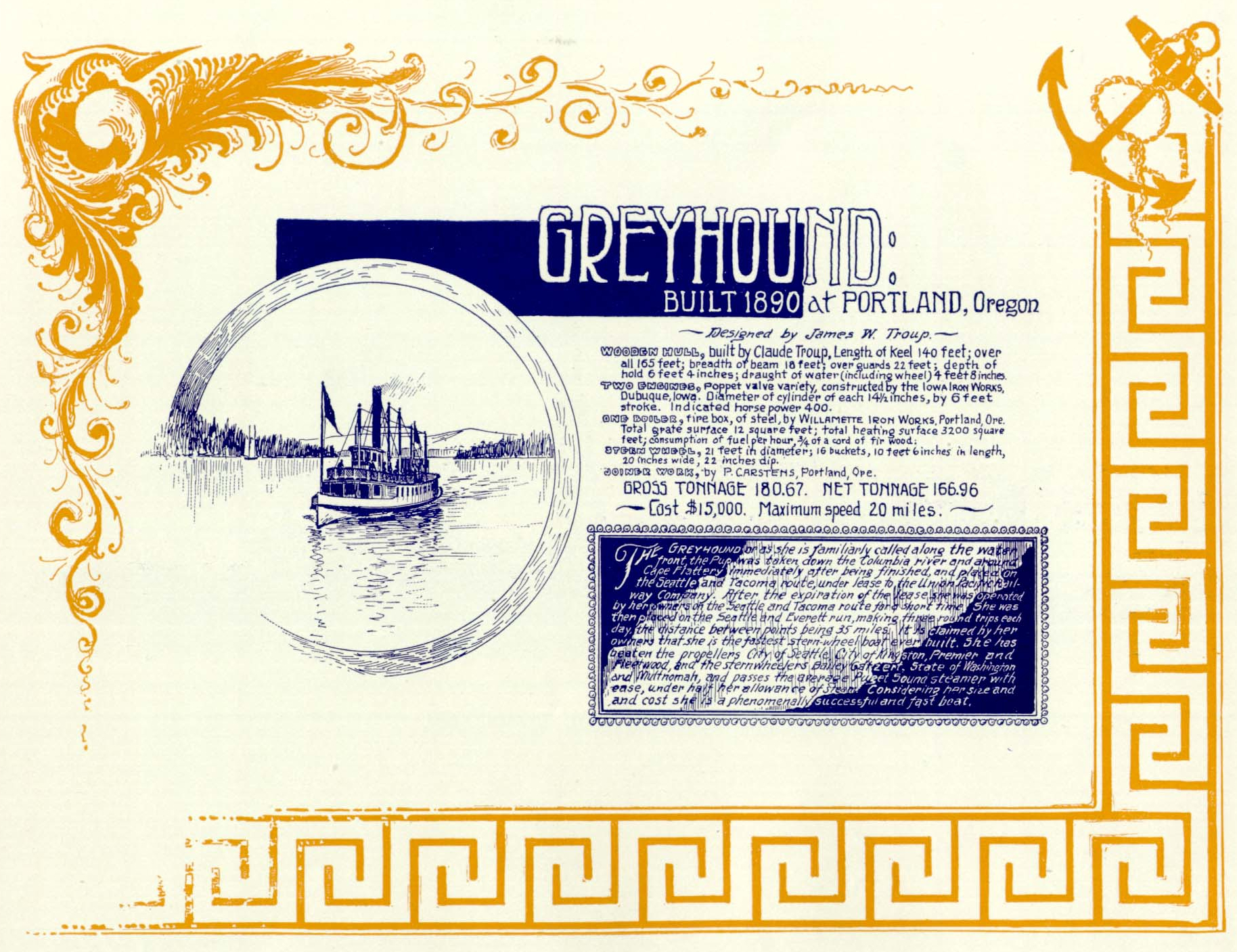
Greyhound, image and artwork circa 1893 by Samuel Ward Stanton

Shortly after completion Greyhound was taken round to the Sound in September by Captain Lewis. She was built almost exclusively for passenger traffic and showed remarkable speed. Once on Puget Sound Greyhound raced against and beat all the crack boats on the Tacoma and Seattle route. Greyhound started express passenger service between Seattle and Tacoma on September 7, 1890, with Capt. Howard Bullene in command and Claude Troup acting as chief engineer. On the very first trip, Greyhound raced and beat the Fleetwood.

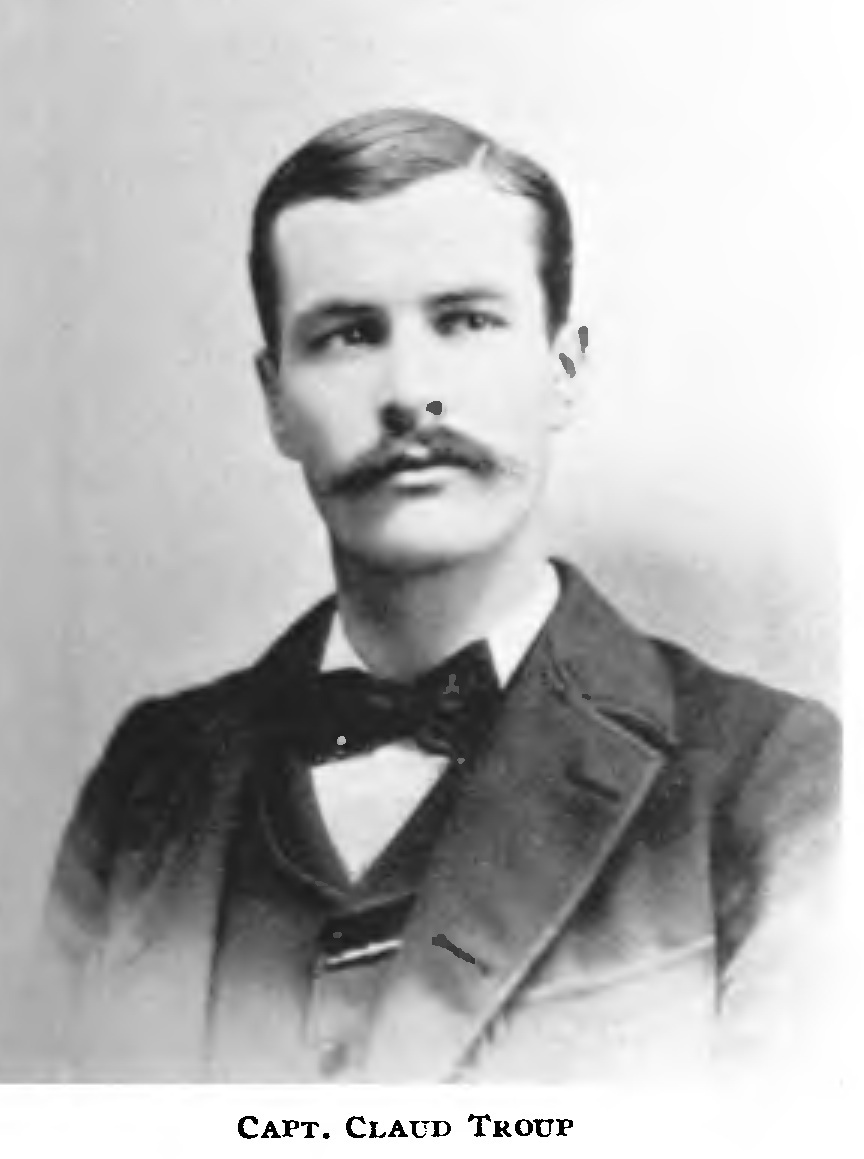
Claud Troup, captain of Greyhound

Shortly after Greyhound reached Puget Sound, Captain U.B. Scott brought the fast propeller steamer Flyer up from Portland where she too had been built, and put her on the same Tacoma-Seattle run in competition with Greyhound. In a typical anti-competitive transaction of the time, Capt. Scott offered the owners of Greyhound a subsidy if they would take her off the route. Troup agreed, and in November, 1891 he sold her to the Seattle & Tacoma Navigation Company, of which he was president. From then until 1903 she was operated on the Everett and Seattle route, making three round trips a day. Captain Troup handled the boat himself most of the time.

== Speed ==
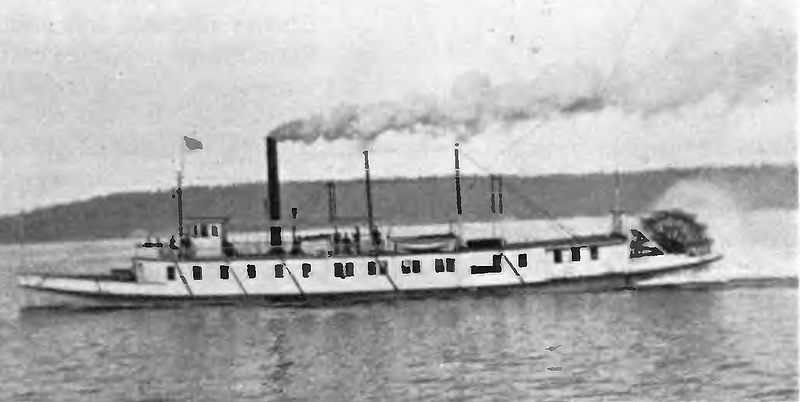
Greyhound at high speed

Greyhound, "all wheel and whistle" mounted both a greyhound statue on the roof of her pilot house and a broom on her masthead, showing that she'd swept the sea of her competition. One day she raced against the magnificent Bailey Gatzert, which thereafter mounted both the dog and the broom.

== Later career ==
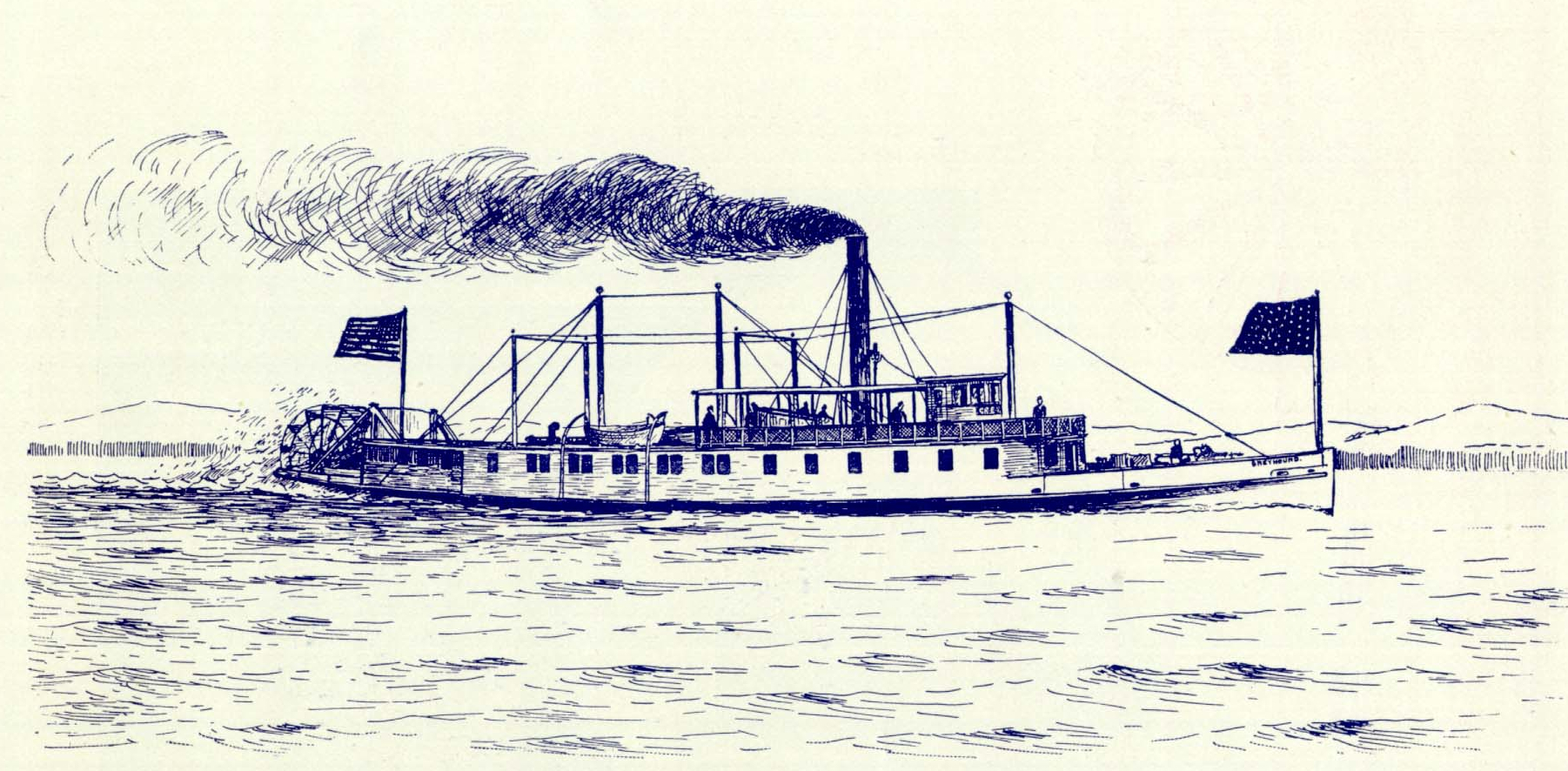
Greyhound, drawing by Samuel Ward Stanton, circa 1893

In 1903, Greyhound was replaced on the Everett route by Telegraph, then a new sternwheeler. Greyhound was sold to a firm that placed her on the route between Olympia and Tacoma, where she ran against the old Willamette River sternwheeler Multnomah and also Capital City, another sternwheeler. Following a rate war, Greyhound's new owners bought both Multnomah and Capital City, to form the Olympia-Tacoma Navigation Company.

== Out of service ==
In 1911 the new propeller steamer Nisqually was built at Quartermaster Harbor and acquired by the Olympia Tacoma Navigation Co. to replace Greyhound, which was then relegated to relief boat service. By 1924, Greyhound had been out of service for many years, and all that remained was her hull. She was still in good enough shape to warrant hauling her out in Tacoma in 1924, for repair, caulking and painting.

An article in The News Tribune, Sat, Feb 21, 1925 ·Page 13 told the final story of its "passing" in December 1924, "The old Greyhound hull, faithful for 25 or 30 years past, suffered its fatal damage in the December (1924) "blow" here (Tacoma) which battered the bottom to such an extent that the old craft had to be destroyed."
