= Capt. George Raabe House =

Historic building in Portland, Oregon, U.S.

- U.S. National Register of Historic Places
- Portland Historic Landmark
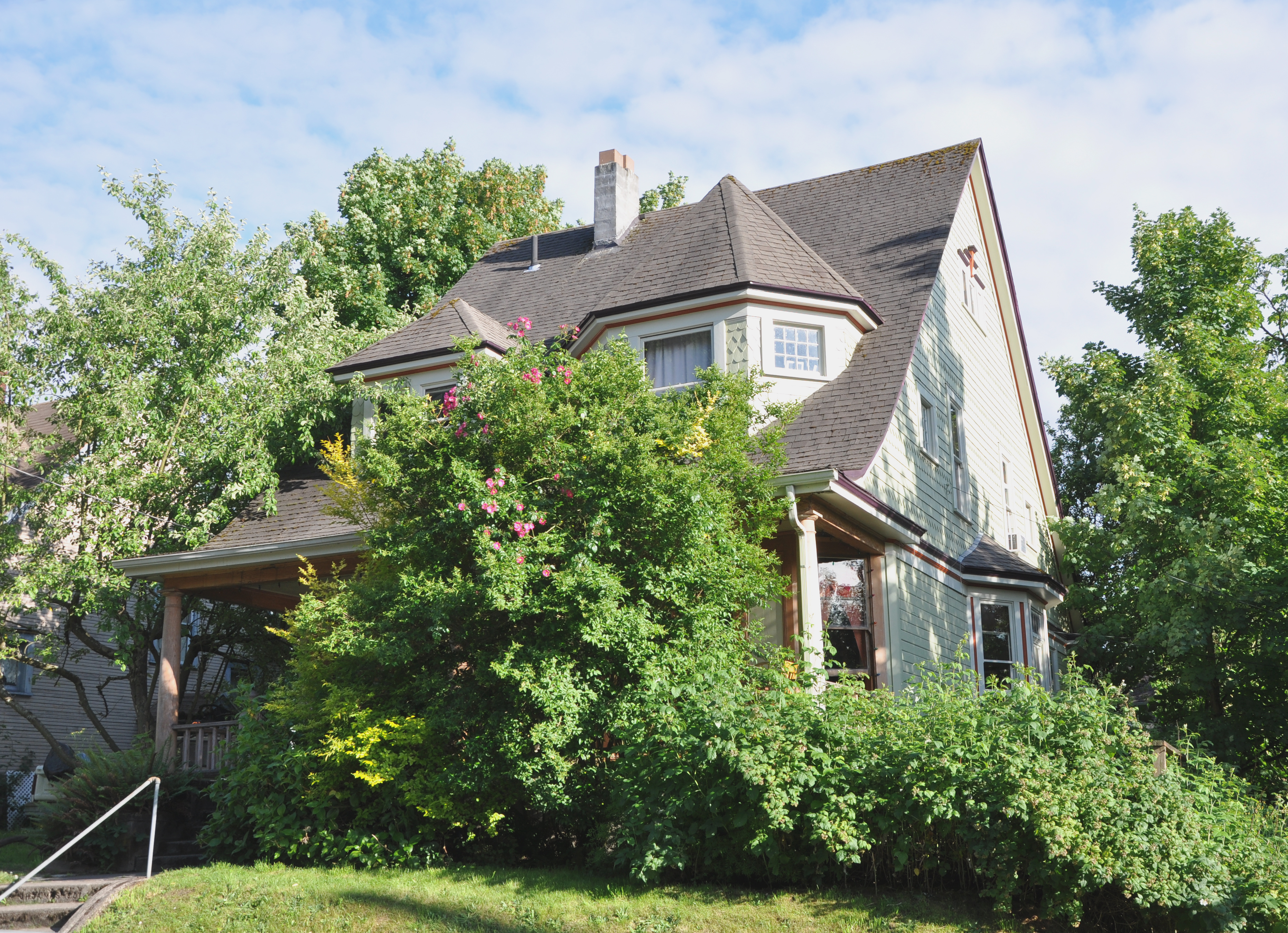
- The Raabe House in 2011
- Location: 1506–1508 SE Taylor Street; Portland, Oregon
- Coordinates: 45°30′53″N 122°39′01″W
- Built: 1902
- Architectural style: American Craftsman, Shingle, Colonial Revival
- MPS: Portland Eastside
- NRHP reference No.: 89000107
- Added to NRHP: March 8, 1989

The Capt. George Raabe House in southeast Portland in the U.S. state of Oregon is a 1.5-story dwelling listed on the National Register of Historic Places. Built in 1902, it was added to the register in 1989.

The house, which combines elements of the American Craftsman, Shingle, and Colonial Revival architectural styles, was home to Captain George Raabe, who piloted steamships on the Columbia and Willamette rivers for the Oregon Railroad and Navigation Company (OR&N). Features include a broad side-gabled roof with a half-tower, classical columns that support the front porch, and fluted pilasters by the main entrance. Originally a single-family dwelling, the house was converted to two dwellings in the 1940s. The first floor apartment has five rooms, and the upstairs apartment has three. A second front door, added in the 1983, leads to stairs to the second floor.

== History ==
Raabe, born in Norway in 1852, moved to California with his parents in 1866 and to Oregon about two years later, after which he went to work for OR&N. Raabe was made captain of the steamship Old McMinnville; later he supervised construction of William H. Hoag. In 1880, he built Salem and later commanded Multnomah. In 1898, he went to Alaska during a gold rush to pilot steamers on the Stikine River.

Returning to Portland in about 1900, Raabe bought the house from the estate of James C. Hawthorne, a prominent East Portland physician. Once again piloting steamers on local rivers, Raabe lived in the house until he sold it to John H. James in about 1907. He later returned to Alaska to pilot boats on the Yukon River between White Horse and Dawson.

== See also ==
- National Register of Historic Places listings in Southeast Portland, Oregon
