= Multnomah (sternwheeler) =

1885 steamboat in United States

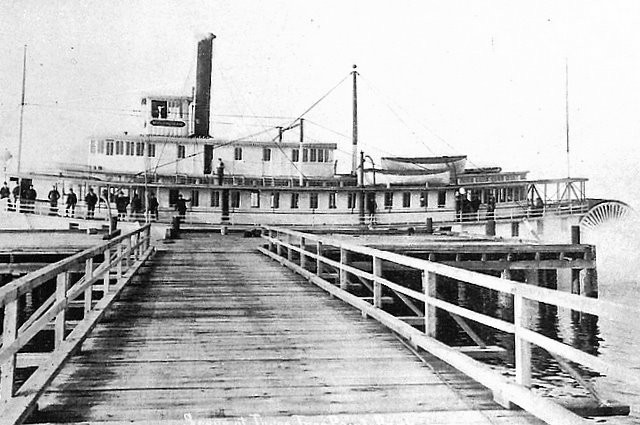
- Multnomah at dock at Three Tree Point, circa 1910

History
- Name: Multnomah
- Port of registry: United States
- Launched: August 1885
- In service: 1885-1911
- Fate: Sunk following collision, 1911

General characteristics
- Type: Sternwheel passenger/freight/towboat
- Length: 143 ft (43.6 m)

The sternwheeler Multnomah was built at East Portland, Oregon in 1885 and operated on the Willamette and Columbia Rivers until 1889 in the United States. She was later transferred to Puget Sound and became one of the better known steamboats operating there.

== Construction and Early Operations ==
She was built for the run from Portland to Oregon City and was considered one of the top boats on the Willamette River at the time. Multnomah was launched in August 1885. One of her early captains was James D. Miller (1830–1914).

== Transfer to Puget Sound ==
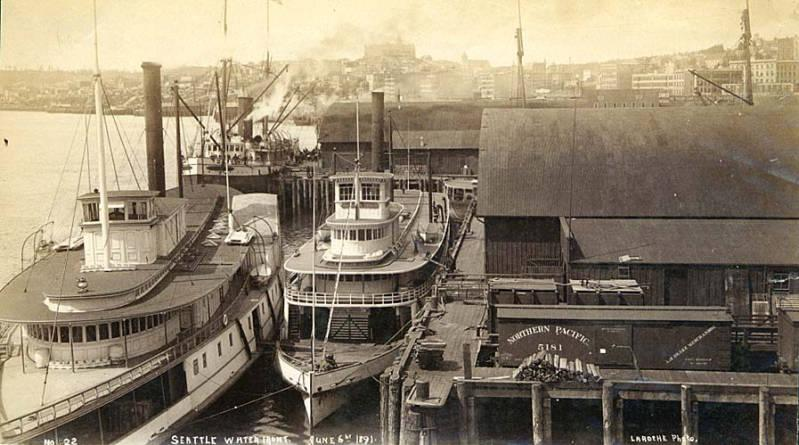
Steamboats at the Union Pacific Dock in Seattle, Washington, June 6, 1891. Multnomah appears to be the vessel closest to the dock. The larger vessel appears to be T.J. Potter.

In 1889, Multnomah was transferred to Puget Sound, where under the ownership of the S. Willey Navigation Company she made regular runs from Olympia to points on Puget Sound. In 1900, Captain H.H. McDonald (1857–1924), who had already been operating the sternwheelers Elwood and Skagit Queen on the lower Sound, bought Multnomah and Capital City (ex-Dalton) from S. Willey Navigation, and put them in competition with the Greyhound, which had been taken off the Seattle-Tacoma run. There was a rate war between the two concerns, and eventually Greyhound’s owners, acting as the Olympia-Tacoma Navigation Company, bought Multnomah and Capital City from Captain McDonald. Captain George W. Barlow, a son of an Oregon pioneer family, commanded all three vessels at various times; he retired in 1910.

In 1900, Multnomah and City of Aberdeen hauled beer from the Olympia Brewery to various points on Puget Sound. Once acquired by the Olympia-Tacoma Navigation Company, Greyhound ran with Multnomah on the Seattle-Tacoma-Olympia route, making at various smaller landings in the South Sound, including Three Tree Point and Johnson’s Landing on Anderson Island.

Other captains for the Olympia-Tacoma Navigation Company included George L. Hill, who was in command on November 10, 1904 when Multnomah collided with the French full-rigged ship Amiral Cecile in Commencement Bay. In foggy conditions, the steamboat passed under the bowsprit of the ship, and the ship’s anchor flukes caught in the steamer’s upper works, tearing them up. Litigation went on for eight years over this, amid apparently credible charges that witnesses had been paid off.

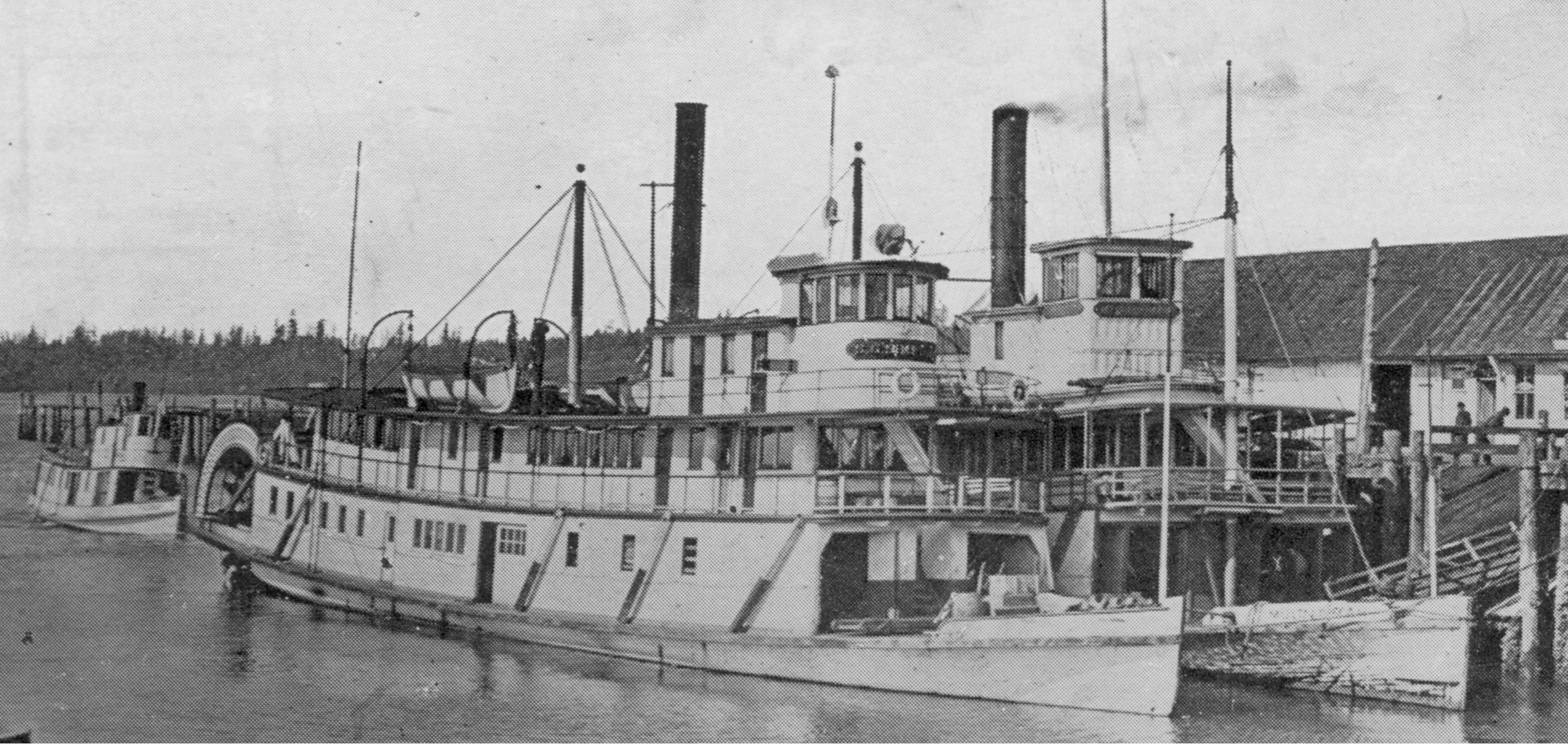
Multnomah (on right) and S.G. Simpson (left) at dock in Olympia, circa 1911, with unidentified smaller steamer approaching at far left

In 1907, Multnomah was converted from wood to oil-fired boilers. Almost all the boats built after 1905 were oil-fired, and they had improved locomotive-style boilers which lessened the chances of explosion. The Olympia-Tacoma Navigation Company kept both Multnomah and Greyhound on the Tacoma-Olympia run until 1911, when they were replaced with the new express propeller steamer Nisqually. Even then, bus lines (called then the “auto stage”) were starting to compete with the steamboats. At some point she was assigned work as a towboat.

== Collision and sinking ==
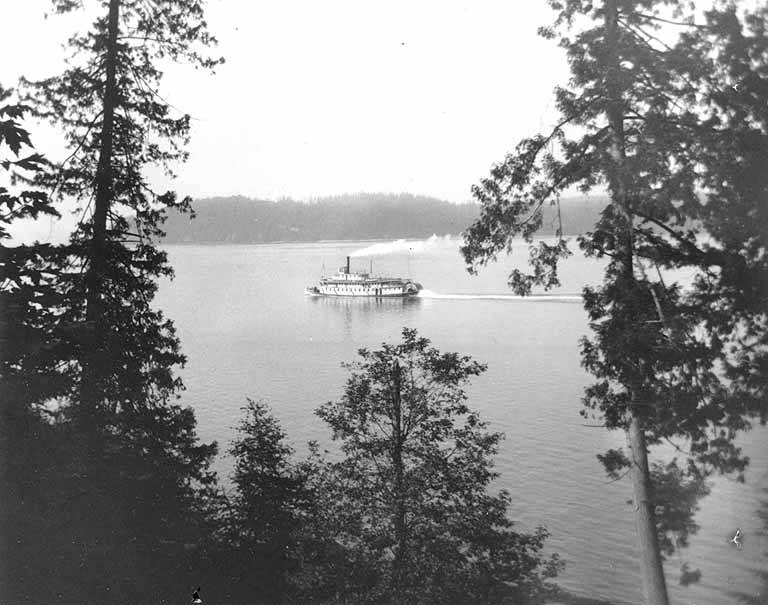
Multnomah passing through Tacoma Narrows, as seen from Point Defiance Park, summer, 1898

Multnomah met her end on October 28, 1911, when in a dense fog in Elliott Bay, she was rammed by the steamer Iroquois, sinking in 240 feet of water.
