= Gottlieb Burian =

Gottlieb Burian (1837–1902) is the namesake for the city of Burien, Washington. He was an early settler to the region (before Washington statehood in 1889) who established a home near what is now known as Lake Burien in 1884. He originally immigrated with his wife from Middle Silesia to the United States in 1862, first residing in Minnesota, where he started his family, then moved to the Seattle area, where he became a prominent citizen.

== Biography ==
Gottlieb Burian was born on 26 March 1837 (baptized 28 March 1837) in Hussinetz, Middle Silesia, Prussia (now Gęsiniec, Poland). He was the tenth child of twelve to Johann Burian, a land owner in Hussinetz, and Maria Elisabeth (née Laschtufka) Burian. He married Emma Bertha Wilhelmine Wurm, probably in Kolberg (now Kolobrzeg, Poland) when he was 24 years old. The couple immigrated from Hamburg to Castle Garden, New York on the barque Liriope in 1862.

After arriving in America, Burian and his wife established their first home in St. Paul, Minnesota where they began raising a family and Gottlieb worked as a shoemaker. Twelve years later, in 1874, Burian and his family moved to Thurston County, Washington, then settled further north in Seattle. Burian soon owned two successful taverns, became active in the city's German community, and purchased a large home in Seattle's Capitol Hill neighborhood. His three children who survived childhood, Martha, Frank, and Emma Clara Burian, were born in Seattle.

In 1884, Gottlieb Burian found an attractive homestead site on unsettled, forested land on the southeast corner of Lake Burien in Sunnydale, 12 miles south of Seattle. Five years later, he bought the land directly from a federal government land office and built a second home there as a retreat from city life. Burian became a popular and respected figure in the community, which was renamed "Burien" to honor him following his death (although spelled with an "e" rather than an "a").

Burian was struck by an electric streetcar when he changed direction while crossing a street in downtown Seattle in November 1900. He was badly injured and a series of high-profile court cases followed. Litigation was finally settled in 1904 by the Washington State Supreme Count which overturned a Superior Court decision and ruled in his favor with his wife and daughter substituted as plaintiffs.

While the case was moving through the courts, Burian died of an illness unrelated to the accident on 21 February 1902. Residents paid their final respects in a large funeral procession that included a band and wagons filled with flowers. He and all of the members of his immediate family are buried at Lake View Cemetery in Seattle.

According to the Highline Historical Society, there is no evidence that Gottlieb Burian descended from a noble Prussian family. It also states there is no evidence that he and members of his family ever spelled their last name any way other than "Burian" despite tales that he was known as "von Boorien". Possible explanations for the myths surrounding the spelling of his name may originate from World War I reports about Austrian foreign minister Stephan Burian von Rajecz, called Baron von Burian in newspaper headlines of the time.
