= Lake Burien =

Lake in Burien, Washington

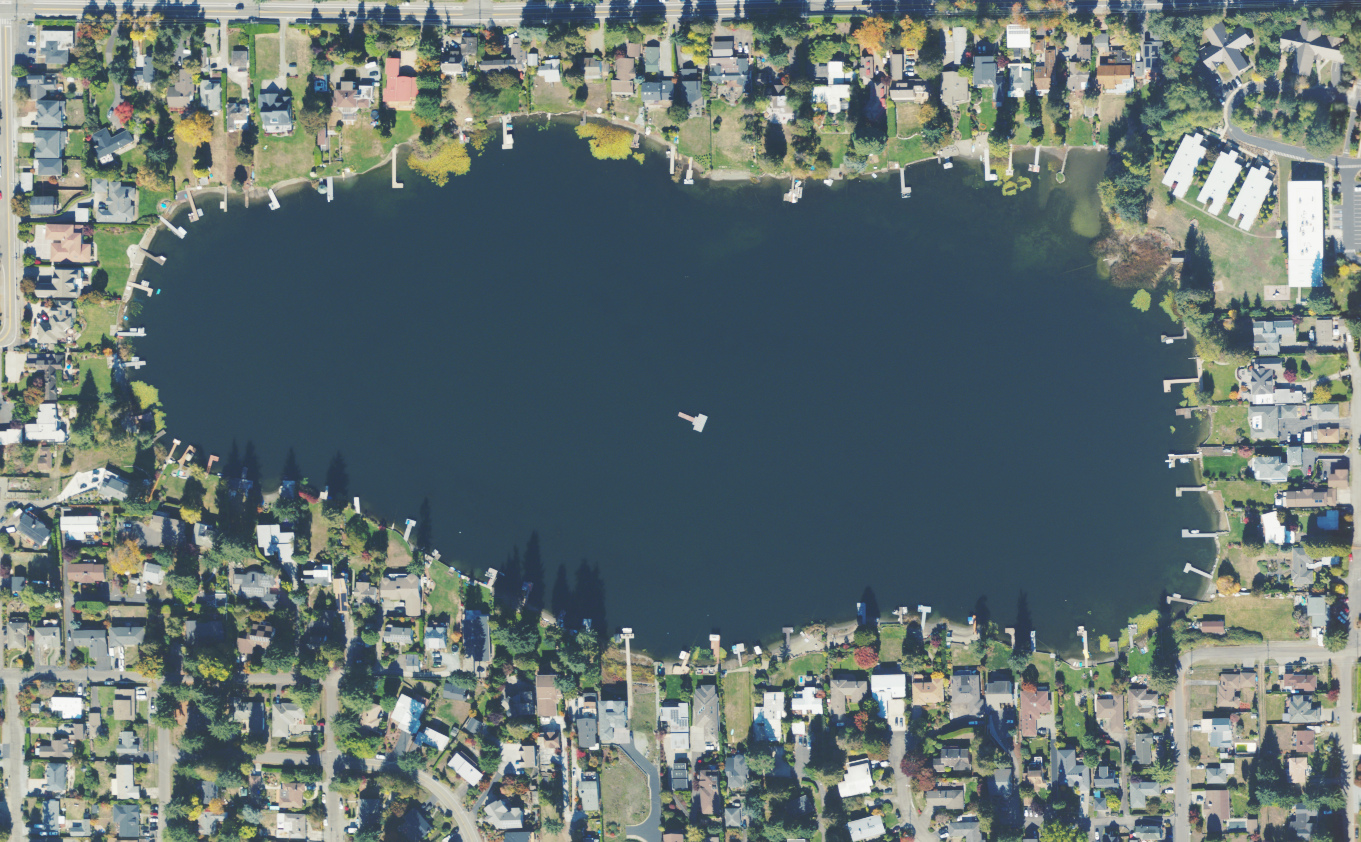
- Lake Burien in October 2023
- Location: Burien, Washington
- Coordinates: 47.464698°N 122.353826°W
- Basin countries: United States
- Surface area: 44 acres (18 ha)
- Max. depth: 29 ft (8.8 m)

Lake Burien is a small lake in Burien, Washington, just west of downtown. The lake is publicly owned, but is completely surrounded by private property, rendering it inaccessible to the public.

== History ==
Lake Burien played a key role in Burien's early history. The city was originally founded by homesteaders, who settled along Puget Sound and the shores of the lake. The Lake was named for Gottlieb and Emma Worm Burian, early settlers in the area (it is unclear how "Burian" became "Burien"). In the early 20th century, Lake Burien became a popular summer vacation destination for those living in nearby Seattle. The Highland Park and Lake Burien Railway, constructed in 1912, spurred further development of the area.

== Description ==
Lake Burien has 660 acres (270 ha) of watershed, extending mostly to the north and south of the lake. It is a kettle lake, formed by the retreat of the Cordilleran ice sheet. Nearby Angle Lake and Bow Lake were also formed in this process. The last water quality report was taken in 2004, indicating a borderline mesotrophic/oligotrophic lake. However, the lake has had several issues with algal blooms.

Lake Burien is publicly owned, but is completely surrounded by private property. This has angered many local residents, who see it as a public resource that all citizens should be able to enjoy. Lakefront property owners have pushed back against these claims, arguing that public access will hurt water quality. In 2023, a group of residents petitioned the city to buy land from the Ruth Dykeman Children's Center to create a lakefront park. The city refused to consider this proposal.

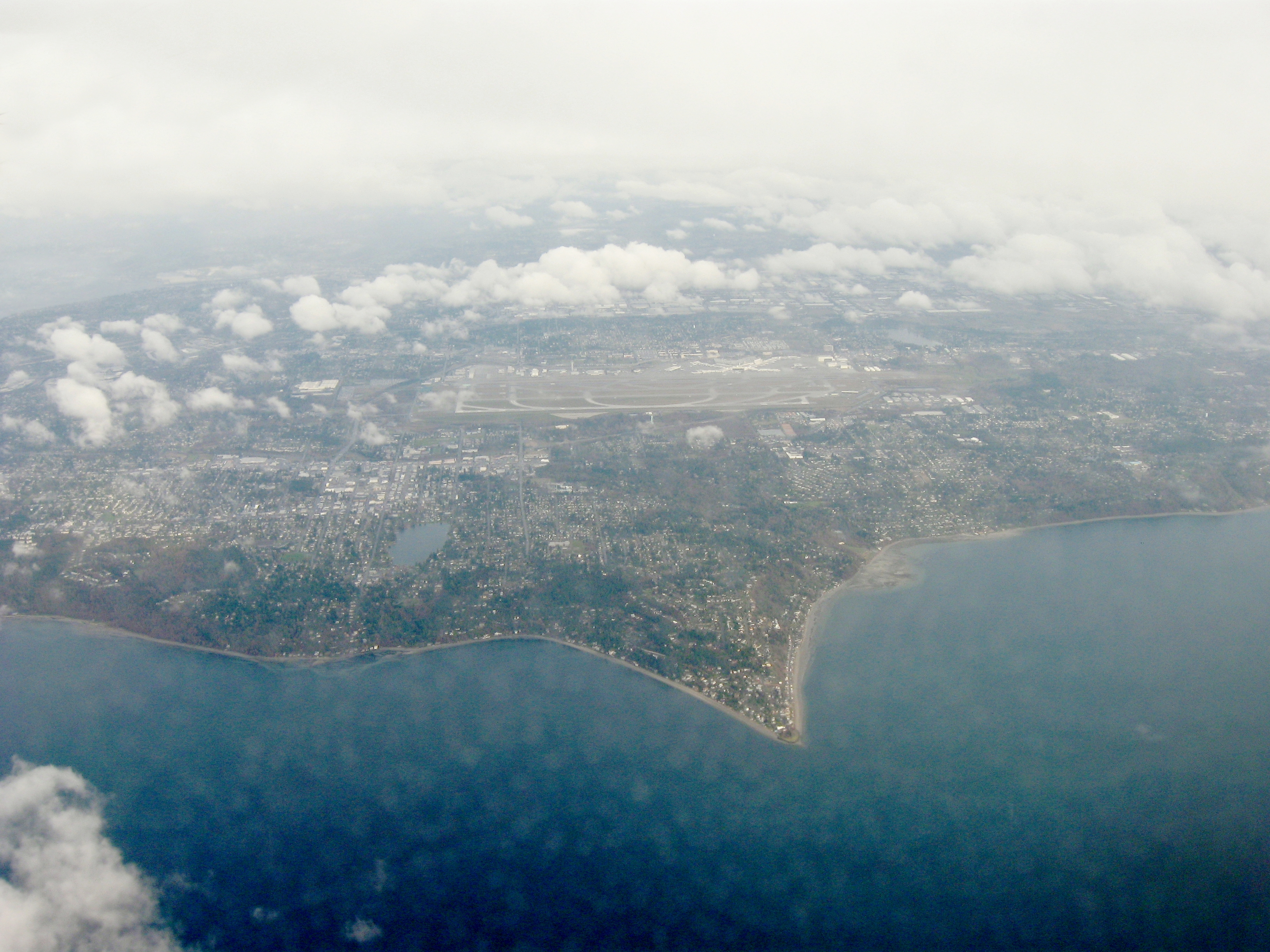
View from the west over the Puget Sound, showing the lake, Seattle-Tacoma International Airport, and downtown Burien
