= Allentown, Tukwila, Washington =

Coordinates: 47°29′39″N 122°16′34″W

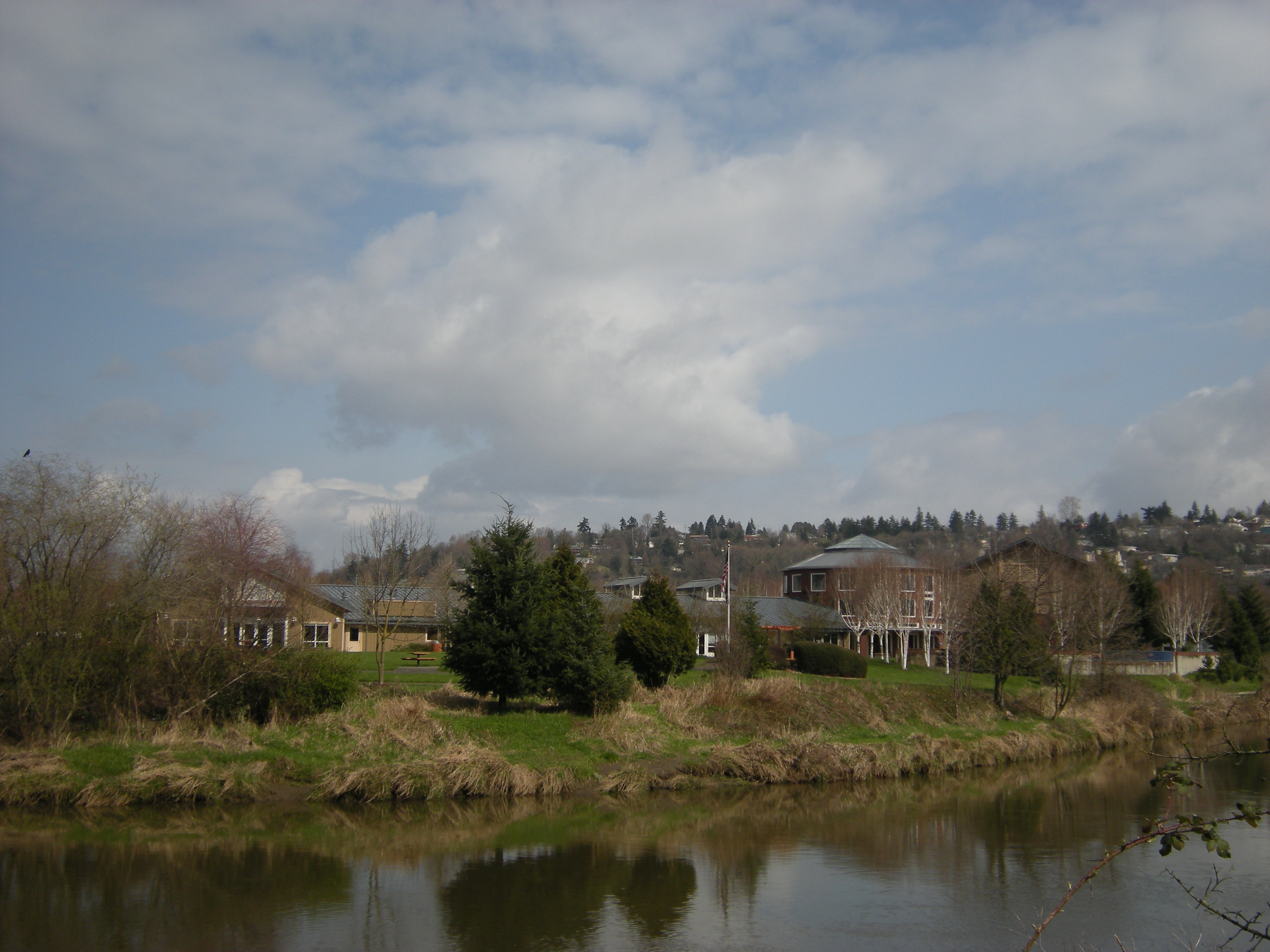
Tukwila Community Center in Allentown, seen from across the Duwamish River (2009).

Allentown is a neighborhood of Tukwila, Washington, on the Duwamish River. It is situated between the Rainier View neighborhood of southern Seattle and the Boulevard Park neighborhood of unincorporated King County.

== History ==
The area was settled by Joseph Allen, for whom the area is named, in 1879. Allentown voted to be annexed into the city of Tukwila in February 1989, adding 1,200 residents and 2.6 square miles (6.7 km^{2}) to the city.
