= Seahurst Park =

Park in Burien, Washington, US

Coordinates: 47°28′49″N 122°21′33″W

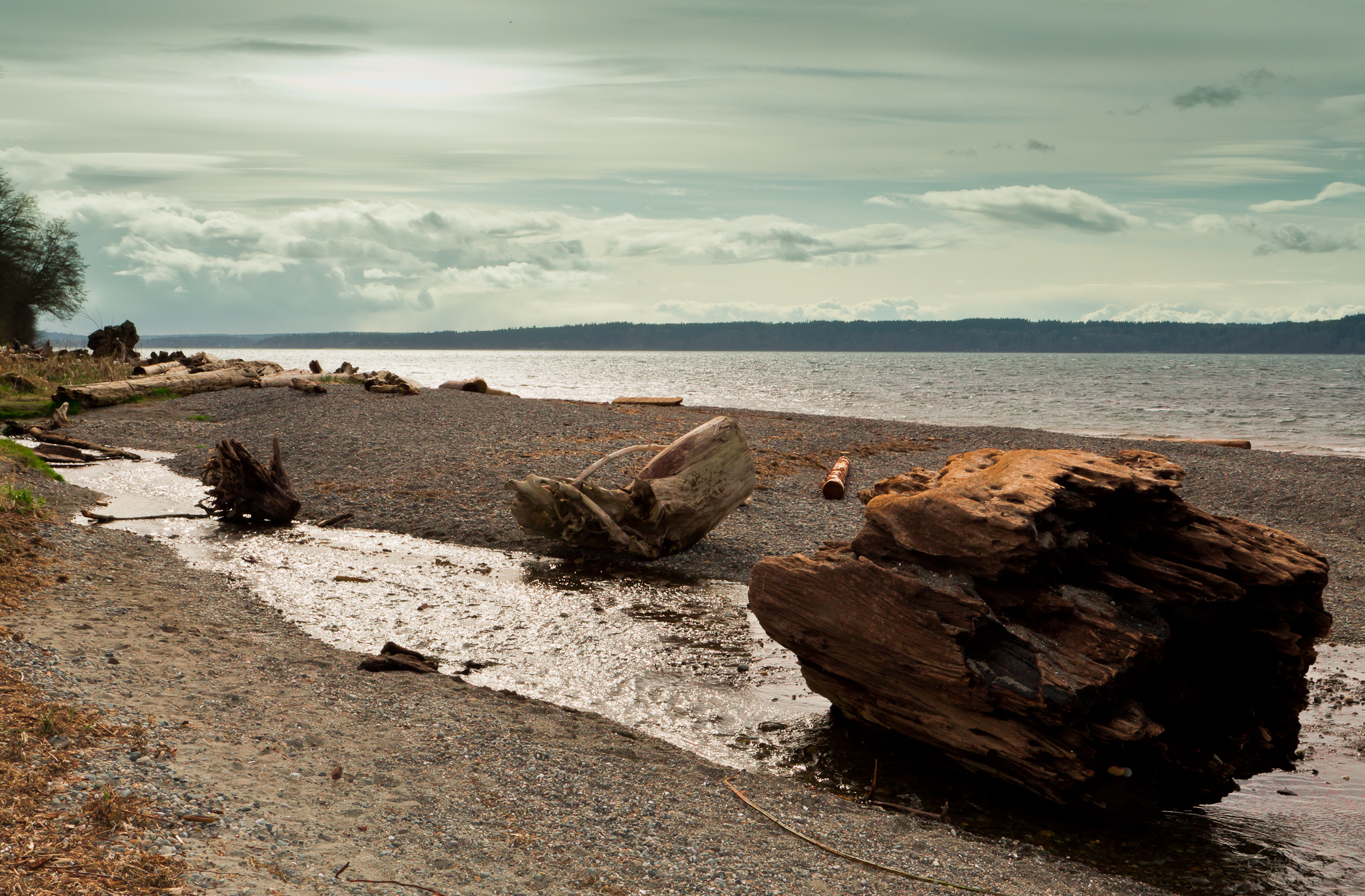
Seahurst Park's beach along Puget Sound

Seahurst Park, in Burien, Washington (a suburb of Seattle), is a 178-acre (0.72 km^{2}) park with forests and a beach on Puget Sound. Originally a King County park, it was given to the newly incorporated city of Burien in 1996. The beach is about 2,000 feet (610 m) long, and the upper part of the beach has been made into a sea wall.

== Geology ==
The western border of the park is a beach on Puget Sound. At the eastern edge of the park the elevation is as high as 425 feet (130 m). The beach is undergoing a restoration to a more natural state, the biggest part of which is removing a 35-year-old seawall and replacing it with a sloping beach. There are two primary streams in the park one on the south end and one on the north. Between the streams a steep slope runs along the shore just above the beach. The north creek basin contains a large wetland area that extends back from the beach nearly to the eastern border of the park in some places. Many of the slopes in Seahurst Park are considered unstable and there is historical evidence of numerous landslides in some areas. The park also has many springs.

== Wildlife ==
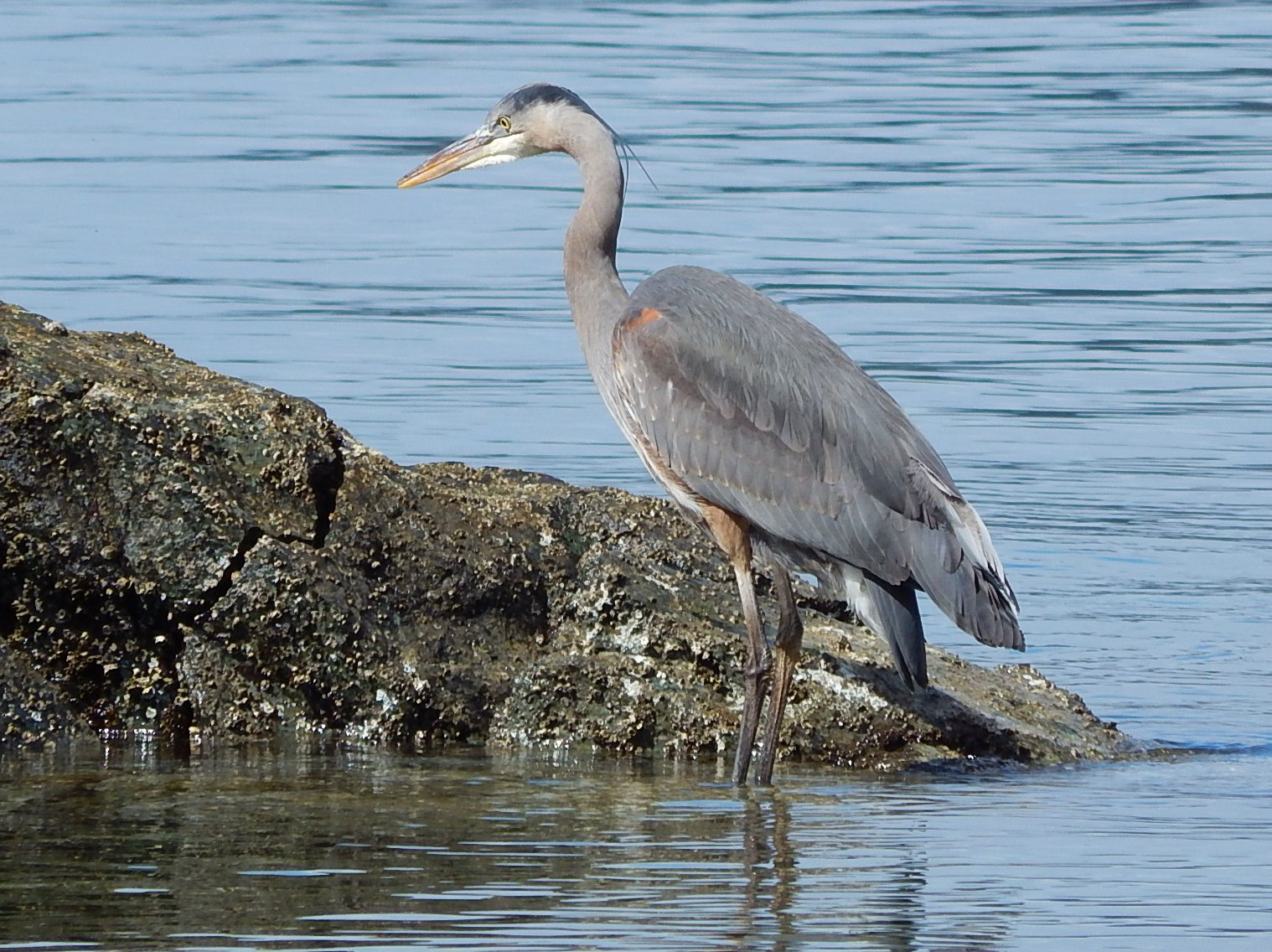
Great Blue Heron at Seahurst Park

Seahurst Park is home to a wide variety of wildlife. Eagles, herons, woodpeckers, owls, pheasants, raccoons, and the usual host of seabirds and marine creatures are all regularly seen or heard in the park. There is a salmon hatchery in the Park, but no natural salmon run, the returning salmon are used as the source for the next batch of salmon to be released. The hatchery and related Marine Technology Lab is operated by several local school districts as an educational facility. Seahurst Park is designated a Marine Reserve Area by the City of Burien in order to protect marine creatures along the shore. In a 1997 assessment of beaches in the King County region, Seahurst Park had the second fewest clams per square foot, and the smallest average size among the surveyed beaches. In 2004, a major beach habitat rehabilitation project began at Seahurst Park so those numbers may have improved by now. No current study is available for comparison.

== History ==
Most of the land constituting present-day Seahurst Park was purchased by A.F. Pope, W.C. Talbot, and Cyrus Walker May 15, 1869, and provided lumber for their longstanding mill at Port Gamble, Washington It was a popular place for picnics in the early 20th Century, as well as for fishing, clam-digging and berrying. As of 1915, the Seahurst Land Company owned 200 acres (81 ha), an area slightly larger than the present-day park, with 16th SW to the east, Puget Sound to the west, and SW 152nd Street to the south.

Beginning in the early 1900s, a family named Fox had an extensive estate that intersected the present-day park. Beginning around the World War II era, some other houses were built in the area, taking advantage of the natural springs. Developers in the 1950s, particularly Howie Gwinn, who had come to own a large portion of the property, wanted to develop the rest of the land as a community to be called Hurstwood. King County Parks Commissioner Ed Munro was able to put together a plan to sell the county-owned Burien Fieldhouse site to Westside Federal Bank, who built their new headquarters there, then put that money toward buying out Gwinn and one other landowner, acquiring the bulk of what was to become Seahurst Park, including roughly 2,000 feet (610 m) of waterfront. There was also money from a $2 million county bond issue in 1962, and another 23 acres (9.3 ha), including 235 feet (72 m) of waterfront, was purchased as part of Forward Thrust County Proposition 6 (1968), another Parks and Recreation bond.

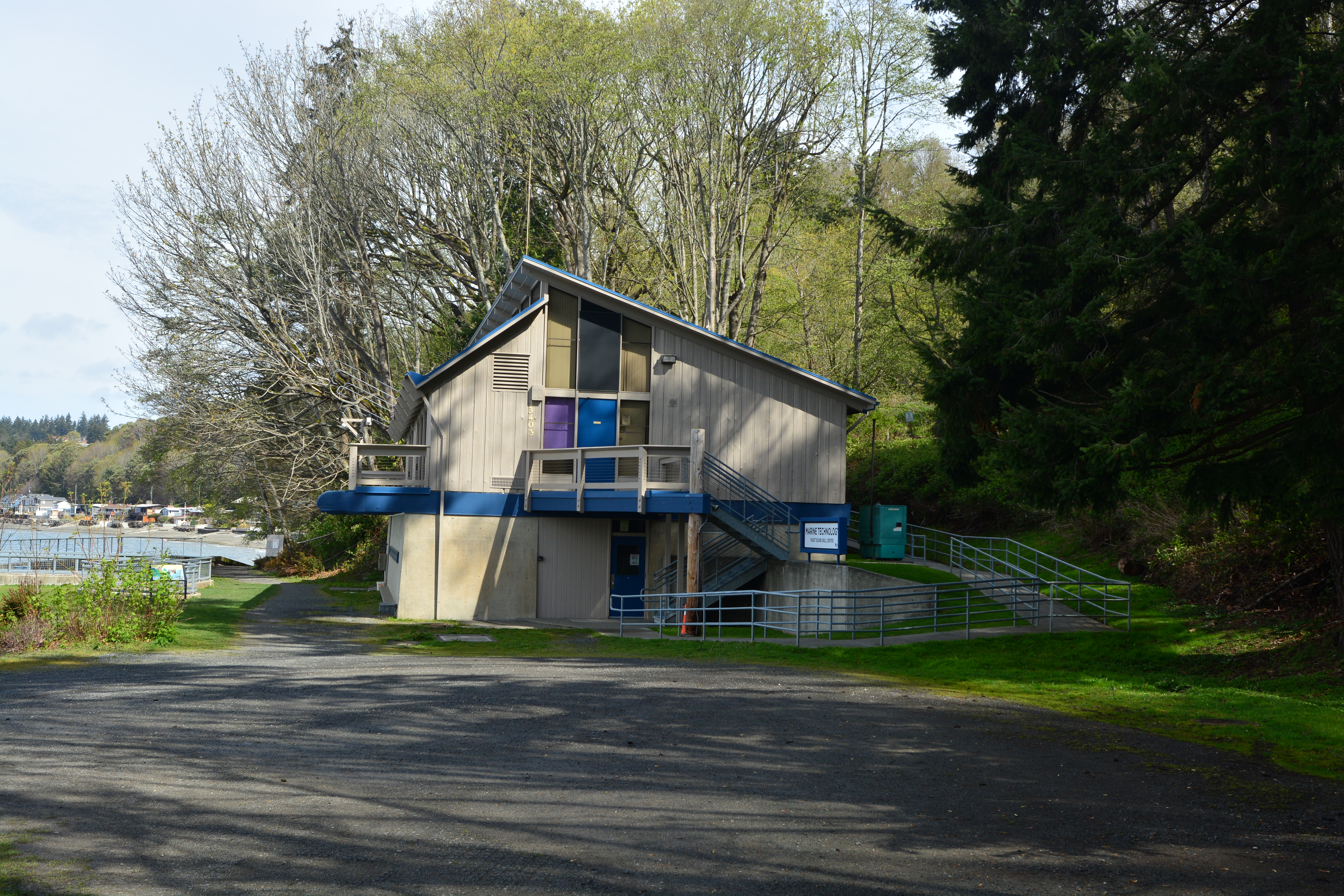
Marine Technology Puget Sound Skills Center in Seahurst Park, operated by the Highline School District

The county and the Highline School District hammered out an arrangement for the latter to build the maritime-oriented occupational skills center and a marine technology lab (incorporating a small salmon hatchery) on the Seahurst land, near the shore. This complex was fully operational by 1972, and remains part of the park,.

Seahurst Park as such was created in 1975, and was managed by the King County Department of Natural Resources and Parks until 1996, when it was ceded to the new city of Burien. Early plans for the park would have included an 8-lane boat launch, and would have taken out much of the beach, but in the end Seahurst became more of a natural park, with its beach largely intact.

The park is also referred to as Ed Munro Park or Ed Munro Seahurst Park, in honor of the Parks commissioner (later a member of the King County Council and a Washington state legislator) who played a key role in its creation.

== Modern ==
The seawall in the park (which was built in 1972) is deteriorating and has changed the environment on the beach. Large logs and native vegetation had been added to the upper beach to both make it look natural and limit access to the beach. A Beach Habitat Restoration project started in 2004 that has already removed 1/3 of the seawall and restored a more natural beach on the southern end of the park. The northern portion started in September 2013 and concluded in the Summer of 2014. During this time, the city has also acquired a 10-acre (40,000 m^{2}) parcel on the southern edge of the park and added it to the system. In addition to the beach restoration some work was done on removing invasive plant species, trails were improved and facilities were upgraded.
