= Highland Park and Lake Burien Railway =

Former interurban railway in Seattle

The Highland Park and Lake Burien Railway was an interurban railway line in the southern suburbs of Seattle, Washington, United States. It connected West Seattle to Highland Park, modern-day White Center, and Burien along 9 miles (14 km) of track. It ran from Harbor Avenue SW along W Marginal Way SW to approximately S Holly Street where it entered private right of way. From there it climbed the heavily forested hill to 9th Avenue SW until SW Henderson Street where it turned west until 16th Avenue SW where it turned south again. It ran until SW 107th Street and then jogged east to 12th Avenue SW. The line continued south all the way to SW 152nd Street where it turned west and terminated around 21st Avenue SW.

The single-track line opened on July 1, 1912, and was intended to open up the area around Lake Burien to residential development. Fares were set at 5 cents for trips within the city limits of Seattle per an agreement with the Seattle Electric Company and 10 cents outside of the city limits. It was originally planned to cost $150,000 and extend further south to Des Moines in a later phase. The railway operated with single passenger cars on a half-hourly schedule with additional flat cars to carry produce and other freight. It was nicknamed the "Highline", which now refers to the southwestern suburbs of Seattle as a whole.

A landslide on November 8 destroyed a one-mile (1.6 km) section of track and caused the line's operator to foreclose after failing to find financing to restore service. The line was sold in an auction under the authority of the King County Sheriff on March 1, 1913, for $12,000. It was donated to the city government and formally incorporated into the Seattle Municipal Street Railway in May 1914, becoming Route 4 of Division C. The damaged section was repaired and service on the city-run line began on May 14, 1914. A viaduct across the Duwamish River delta (now SODO) was built in 1919 to connect West Seattle with Downtown Seattle, extending the line to a full 14 miles (23 km). The Seattle–Burien route was discontinued on May 3, 1929, in favor of a shuttle beyond White Center; service to Burien was shut down in 1931 and the railroad was later abandoned. A new road, now named Ambaum Boulevard, was built along the tracks and later over the former right of way.

== See also ==
- RapidRide H Line, a modern transit route along the corridor
