= Bridge of Scarlet Leaves =

2012 novel by Kristina McMorris

- First edition
- Author: Kristina McMorris
- Language: English
- Publisher: Kensington Books
- Publication date: February 28, 2012
- Media type: Print
- Pages: 352 pp
- ISBN: 0758246854

Bridge of Scarlet Leaves is a 2012 novel by Kristina McMorris, set during the Japanese American internment of World War II. McMorris has stated that she was inspired to write the book due to her own mixed heritage and decided to call the book Bridge of Scarlet Leaves after reading a Japanese haiku.

== Plot ==
Bridge of Scarlet Leaves follows the story of Maddie Kern, a nineteen-year-old violinist with dreams of Juilliard. She lives with her older brother and guardian, TJ, who aspires to become a baseball pitcher. Maddie has lived with TJ since the death of their mother sent their father into a mental hospital. However, TJ does not know that Maddie has a secret—she is dating his best friend, Lane Morimoto, the Japanese-American son of a bank executive. Against the wishes of Lane's family, who want him to marry a Japanese woman, the pair elope and marry. Following the bombing of Pearl Harbor by the Japanese, Lane and his family are seen as traitors and sent to camp. Maddie must choose between her husband's family and Juilliard. The series also follows TJ, as he becomes a prisoner of war, and Lane, who joins the U.S. Army to save his friend's life.

== Characters ==
- Maddie Kern - a nineteen-year-old violinist and wife of Lane
- Takeshi "Lane" Moriotomo - Maddie's Japanese-American boyfriend and later husband
- TJ Kern : Maddie's brother and Lane's friend
- Jo Allister - TJ's love interest and Maddie's best friend
- Paul Lamont - TJ's teammate who taunted Lane
- Emma Moritomo - Lane's sister who cares for Maddie
- Kumiko Moritomo - mother of Lane and Emma
- Cindy Newman - a college girl whom TJ likes
- Vince Ranieri - an Italian-American soldier who makes friends with TJ
- Nobu Moritomo - husband of Kumiko and father of Lane and Emma
- Eddie Sato - a prison guard who is actually Japanese American
- Suzie Moritomo - Lane's and Maddie's daughter

== Reception ==
Initial reception for Bridge of Scarlet Leaves has been positive. The School Library Journal praised the book, citing the author's notes as a highlight of the book.
