= Burien, Washington =

- City
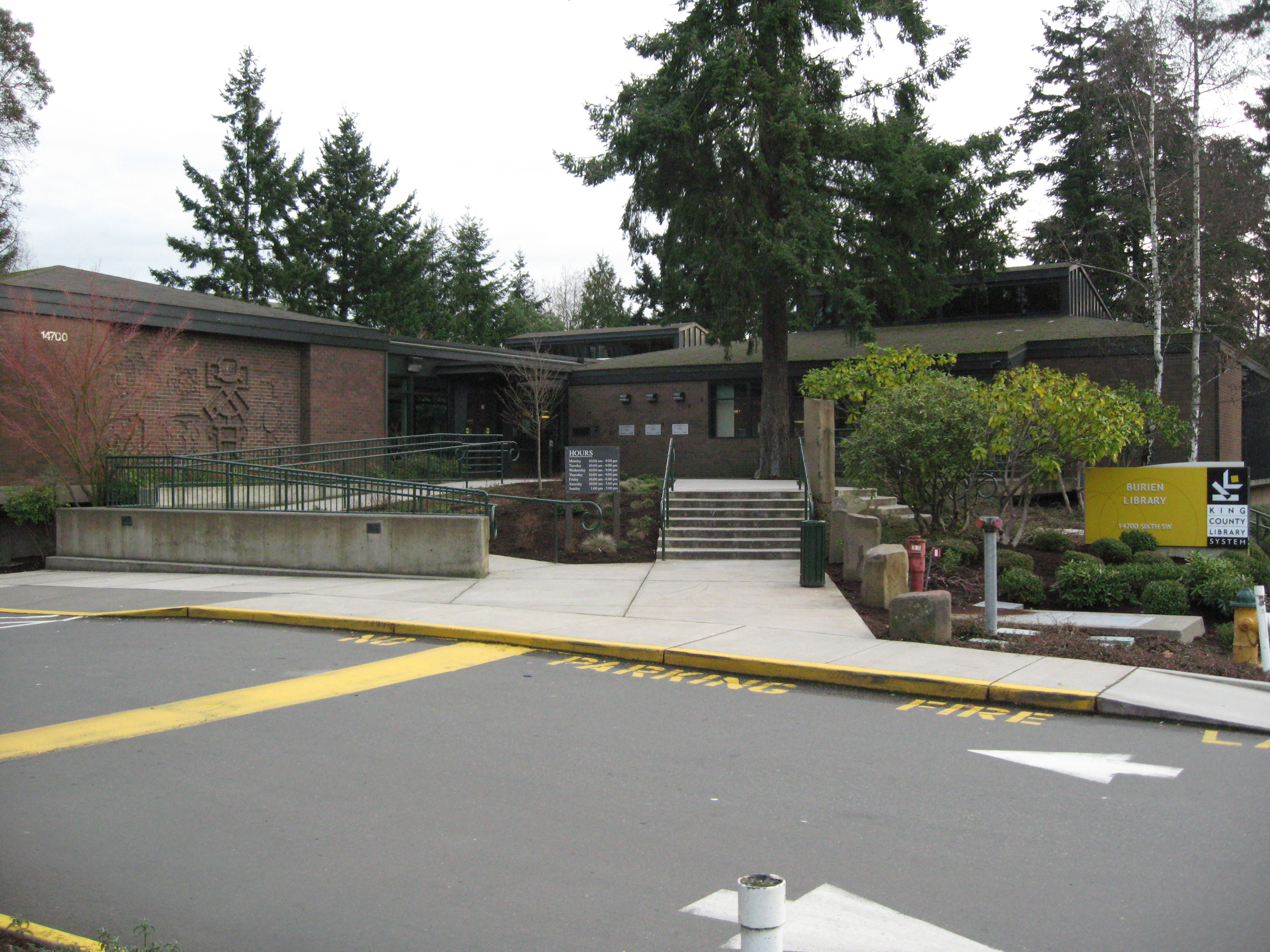

- Seal
- Interactive map of Burien, Washington
- Coordinates: 47°28′50″N 122°20′34″W
- Country: United States
- State: Washington
- County: King
- Incorporated: February 28, 1993

Government
  - Type: Council–manager
  - Mayor: Kevin Schilling
  - Deputy mayor: Sarah Moore
  - City manager: Adolfo Bailon
  - City Council: Hugo Garcia; Linda Akey; Jimmy Matta; Sarah Moore; Alex Andrade

Area
  - Total: 11.19 sq mi (28.98 km^{2})
  - Land: 10.04 sq mi (26.00 km^{2})
  - Water: 1.15 sq mi (2.98 km^{2})
- Elevation: 374 ft (114 m)

Population (2020)
  - Total: 52,066
  - Estimate (2024): 52,046
  - Rank: US: 782nd WA: 25th
  - Density: 5,053.1/sq mi (1,951.01/km^{2})
- Time zone: UTC−8 (Pacific (PST))
  - Summer (DST): UTC−7 (PDT)
- ZIP Codes: 98062, 98146, 98148, 98166, 98168
- Area code(s): 206, 564
- FIPS code: 53-08850
- GNIS feature ID: 2409940
- Website: burienwa.gov

Burien (/ˈbjʊəriən/ BURE-ee-ən) is a suburban city in King County, Washington, United States, located south of Seattle on Puget Sound. As of the 2020 census, Burien's population was 52,066, which is a 56.3% increase since incorporation in 1993, making it the 25th most populous city in Washington. An annexation in 2010 increased the city's population significantly.

== History ==
European settlement in the Burien area dates to 1864, when George Ouellet (1831–1899), a French-Canadian born in Sainte-Marie-de-Beauce, Quebec, purchased his first of several land patents for homestead sites directly from a federal land office. Ouellet had first arrived in the Washington Territory at Port Madison on Bainbridge Island, off the Kitsap Peninsula, in 1858. Three years after purchasing his homestead in the Burien area, he married 14-year-old Elizabeth Cushner, who was born in the Washington Territory, and started a family. Several years later, the Ouellet family moved to the White River Valley, near Auburn.

A popular local tale recounts that an early settler named Mike Kelly gave the community its first name after he emerged from the trees and said, "This is truly a sunny dale." Today, a few long-time residents still refer to the Burien area as Sunnydale.

In 1884, Gottlieb Burian (1837–1902) and his wife Emma (Wurm) Burian (1840–1905), German immigrants from Hussinetz, Lower Silesia, who owned two taverns in downtown Seattle, arrived in Sunnydale. The tiny community was without improved roads or commercial buildings and was reached primarily by trails. Burian built a cabin on the southeast corner of Lake Burien and reportedly formed the community into a town bearing his name (misspelled over the years). A real estate office was built and soon attracted large numbers of new residents to Burien.

In the early 1900s, visitors from Seattle came by the Mosquito Fleet to Three Tree Point, just west of town, to sunbathe and swim.

In 1915, the Lake Burien Railway was completed. It ran on what is today Ambaum Boulevard from Burien to White Center to Seattle. A small passenger train ran the tracks and was affectionately named by the residents the Toonerville Trolley.

=== Incorporation ===
Several proposals to incorporate the greater Burien area, an unincorporated portion of King County, were attempted but failed. In the late 1980s and early 1990s, citizens felt they needed a more responsive government to help address the looming threat of the Port of Seattle's airport runway expansion (known as the "Third Runway") at Seattle–Tacoma International Airport to the east, so an effort was again made to incorporate as a city. Citizens also felt that multi-family apartments and dwellings had proliferated out of control in Burien and other unincorporated areas of King County, and that they had no local voice in government, other than the King County Council, that would hear their concerns.

The city of Burien was incorporated on February 28, 1993, after voter approval.

=== North Highline annexation ===
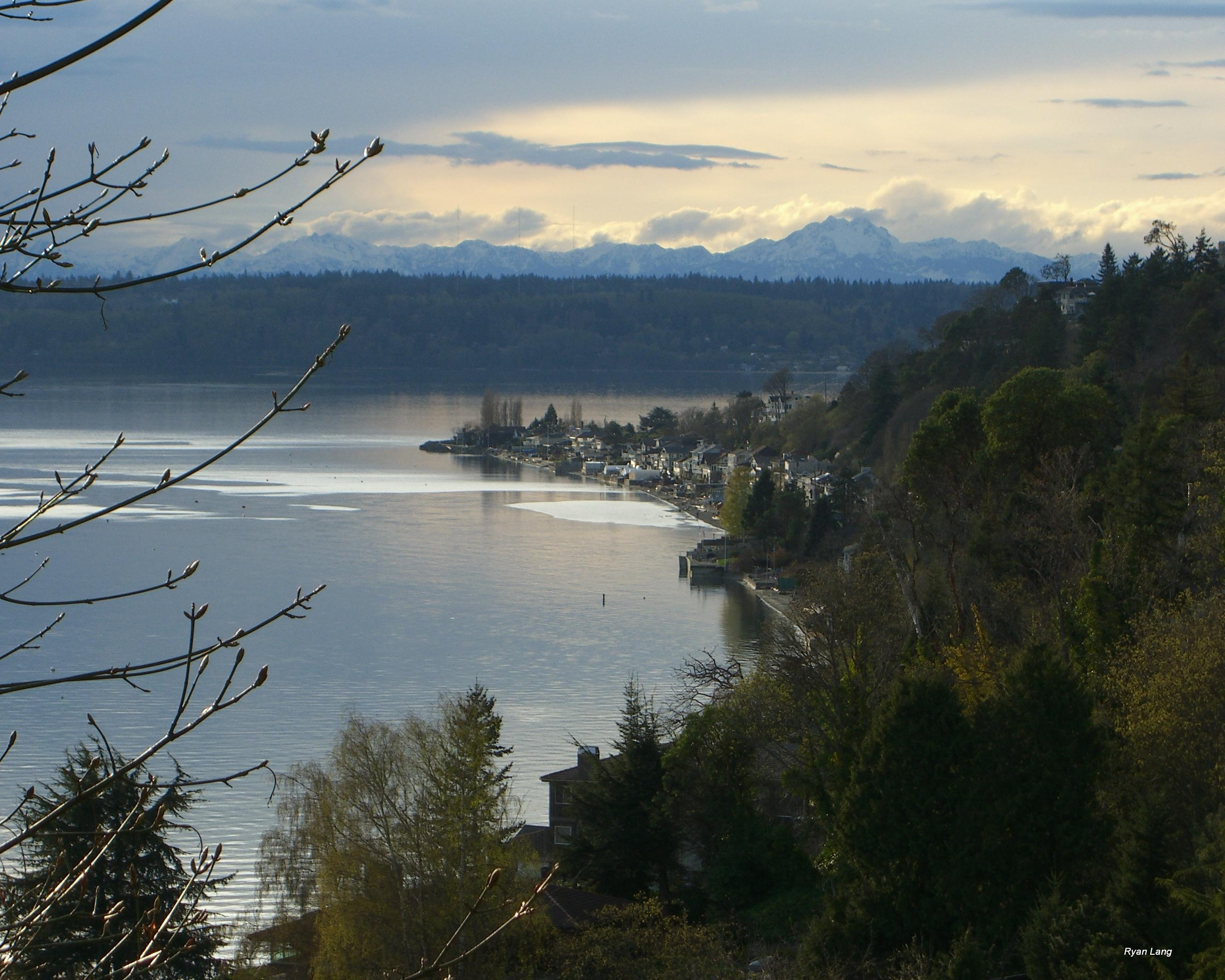
Three Tree Point in Burien at sunset

Late in 2004, the city assessed the possibility of annexing North Highline (which includes White Center and Boulevard Park), "one of the largest urban unincorporated areas of King County," which would double the size of Burien. Many citizens spoke against the annexation and created picket signs and petitions to protest against it. Other citizens welcomed the expansion, as they felt parts of the so-called North Highline area should have been part of the original Burien incorporation, and the area in question is part of the larger Highline area. (The Highline area includes the cities of Burien, Seatac, Des Moines, Federal Way and an unincorporated area called North Highline.)

In May 2008, the Burien City Council proposed an annexation of the southern portion of North Highline, comprising 14,000 residents. In late summer of 2008, the city of Burien prepared to submit their annexation proposal to King County's Boundary Review Board. However, after the city of Seattle protested Burien's proposal, Burien opted to withdraw their annexation plan and resubmit it after new countywide planning policies went into effect.

In October 2008, the Burien City Council voted to resubmit their annexation plan to the county Boundary Review Board. However, the cities of Burien and Seattle, along with King County and other stakeholders, first participated and completed mediation to ensure the interests of all parties involved were met. Affected stakeholders would have agreed to a preliminary annexation framework that stipulated how annexation would play out between the cities of Burien and Seattle and with King County. However, the Seattle City Council voted against the agreement that February. It is not known if Seattle has any future plans for annexation of any part of the North Highline area.

On April 16, 2009, the Boundary Review Board of King County approved Burien's proposal for annexation of the southern portion of the North Highline area: parts of the Riverton-Boulevard Park CDP.

In early May 2009, both King County and the city of Burien passed resolutions to place an annexation proposition on the August 18 primary ballot. The annexation area voted on consisted of southern North Highline and had an area of about 1,600 acres (6.5 km^{2}) and approximately 14,000 citizens. The ballot issue was approved by a majority of southern North Highline residents, and on April 1, 2010, southern North Highline became part of Burien.

After the annexation vote, a special census was conducted, and it was determined that the newly annexed area had 14,292 residents. This resulted in a new population total of 52,066, making Burien the 25th largest city in Washington State.

The Boundary Review Board approved a second proposal for Burien to annex northern North Highline (also known as Area Y) in February 2012, but this was rejected by Area Y residents in November 2012.

=== Downtown development ===
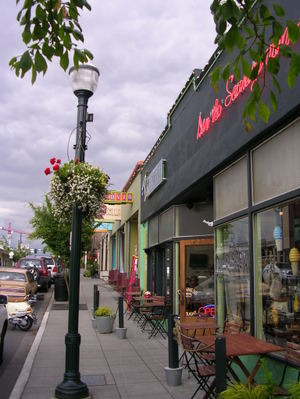
SW 152 Street in Olde Burien

In 2017, the Town Square development in downtown Burien was completed. It includes retail space, condominiums, rental apartments, a senior living center, and a King County Library branch with underground parking. City Hall is located on the top floor of the library building. Town Square Park is at the center of the square and features a spray park for children and a rain garden.

== Geography ==
Burien is located in western King County and is bordered to the north by the city of Seattle and the unincorporated communities of White Center and Boulevard Park, to the east by the cities of Tukwila and SeaTac, to the south by the city of Normandy Park, and to the west by Puget Sound.

According to the United States Census Bureau, the city has a total area of 11.19 square miles (28.98 km^{2}), of which 10.04 square miles (26.00 km^{2}) is land and 1.15 square miles (2.98 km^{2}) is water.

The city's western border consists of 5.5 miles (8.9 km) of shoreline along Puget Sound. Lake Burien, a state-owned water body, is located within the city. It has been the subject of contentious debate due to it being surrounded by private property with no public access.

"Olde Burien" is a name for the area surrounding SW 152nd Street on the west side of Ambaum Boulevard.

== Demographics ==
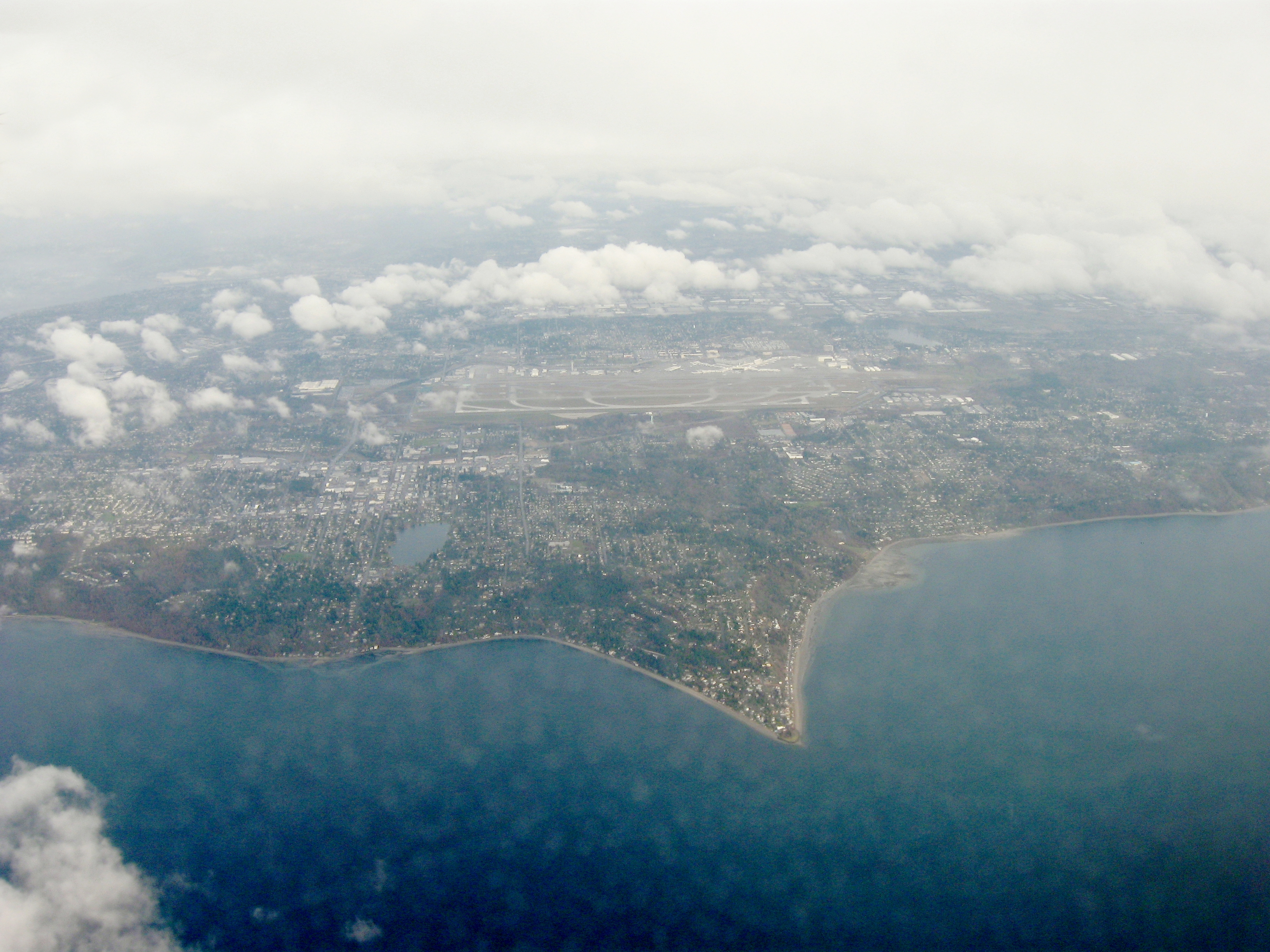
Aerial view of Burien, with Three Tree Point, Lake Burien, and Seattle-Tacoma International Airport

Historical population
Census	Pop.	Note	%±
1980	23,189		—
1990	25,089		8.2%
2000	31,881		27.1%
2010	33,313		4.5%
2020	52,066		56.3%
2024 (est.)	52,046		0.0%
U.S. Decennial Census; 2020 Census

=== Racial and ethnic composition ===
Burien, Washington – racial and ethnic composition Note: the US Census treats Hispanic/Latino as an ethnic category. This table excludes Latinos from the racial categories and assigns them to a separate category. Hispanics/Latinos may be of any race.
Race / ethnicity (NH = non-Hispanic)	Pop. 2000	Pop. 2010	Pop. 2020	% 2000	% 2010	% 2020
White alone (NH)	22,799	18,979	23,341	71.51%	56.97%	44.83%
Black or African American alone (NH)	1,587	1,845	3,836	4.98%	5.54%	7.37%
Native American or Alaska Native alone (NH)	364	291	388	1.14%	0.87%	0.75%
Asian alone (NH)	2,219	3,275	7,313	6.96%	9.83%	14.05%
Pacific Islander alone (NH)	353	585	894	1.11%	1.76%	1.72%
Other race alone (NH)	52	88	284	0.16%	0.26%	0.55%
Mixed race or multiracial (NH)	1,110	1,348	3,254	3.48%	4.05%	6.25%
Hispanic or Latino (any race)	3,397	6,902	12,756	10.66%	20.72%	24.50%
Total	31,881	33,313	52,066	100.00%	100.00%	100.00%

=== 2020 census ===
As of the 2020 census, there were 52,066 people, 19,874 households, and 12,333 families residing in the city. The median age was 39.3 years; 20.5% of residents were under the age of 18, 5.7% were under 5, and 15.3% were 65 years of age or older. For every 100 females there were 103.0 males, and for every 100 females age 18 and over there were 102.5 males age 18 and over.

The population density was 5,186.4 inhabitants per square mile (2,002.5/km^{2}), with 20,785 housing units at an average density of 2,070.4 inhabitants per square mile (799.4/km^{2}). Of those housing units, 4.4% were vacant, with a homeowner vacancy rate of 1.1% and a rental vacancy rate of 3.6%.

100.0% of residents lived in urban areas, while 0.0% lived in rural areas.

Of the 19,874 households, 29.4% had children under the age of 18 living in them, 42.5% were married-couple households, 22.5% were households with a male householder and no spouse or partner present, and 25.7% were households with a female householder and no spouse or partner present. About 28.1% of all households were made up of individuals and 10.5% had someone living alone who was 65 years of age or older.

Racial composition as of the 2020 census
Race	Number	Percent
White	24,780	47.6%
Black or African American	3,987	7.7%
American Indian and Alaska Native	808	1.6%
Asian	7,357	14.1%
Native Hawaiian and Other Pacific Islander	916	1.8%
Some other race	7,719	14.8%
Two or more races	6,499	12.5%
Hispanic or Latino (of any race)	12,756	24.5%

=== 2022 American Community Survey ===
As of the 2022 American Community Survey, there are 19,903 estimated households in Burien with an average of 2.56 persons per household. The city has a median household income of $84,583. Approximately 11.4% of the city's population lives at or below the poverty line. Burien has an estimated 67.9% employment rate, with 29.9% of the population holding a bachelor's degree or higher and 83.8% holding a high school diploma.

=== 2010 census ===
As of the 2010 census, there were 33,313 people, 13,253 households, and 8,013 families residing in the city. The population density was 4,489.8 inhabitants per square mile (1,733.5/km^{2}). There were 14,322 housing units at an average density of 1,930.2 inhabitants per square mile (745.3/km^{2}). The racial makeup of the city was 63.51% White, 5.88% African American, 1.54% Native American, 9.92% Asian, 1.77% Pacific Islander, 11.49% from some other races and 5.88% from two or more races. Hispanic or Latino people of any race were 20.72% of the population.

There were 13,253 households, of which 30.0% had children under the age of 18 living with them, 42.5% were married couples living together, 11.7% had a female householder with no husband present, 6.3% had a male householder with no wife present, and 39.5% were non-families. 31.0% of all households were made up of individuals, and 9.7% had someone living alone who was 65 years of age or older. The average household size was 2.49 and the average family size was 3.12.

The median age in the city was 38.5 years. 22.4% of residents were under the age of 18; 8.4% were between the ages of 18 and 24; 28.1% were from 25 to 44; 28.3% were from 45 to 64; and 12.8% were 65 years of age or older. The gender makeup of the city was 50.3% male and 49.7% female.

=== 2000 census ===
As of the 2000 census, there were 31,881 people, 13,399 households, and 8,066 families residing in the city. The population density was 4,287.0 inhabitants per square mile (1,655.2/km^{2}). There were 13,898 housing units at an average density of 1,868.9 inhabitants per square mile (721.6/km^{2}). The racial makeup of the city was 75.74% White, 5.14% African American, 1.29% Native American, 7.00% Asian, 1.16% Pacific Islander, 5.40% from some other races and 4.28% from two or more races. Hispanic or Latino people of any race were 10.66% of the population.

There were 13,399 households, out of which 27.1% had children under the age of 18 living with them, 43.5% were married couples living together, 11.6% had a female householder with no husband present, and 39.8% were non-families. 32.4% of all households were made up of individuals, and 10.5% had someone living alone who was 65 years of age or older. The average household size was 2.36 and the average family size was 2.98.

In the city the population was spread out, with 22.8% under the age of 18, 8.0% from 18 to 24, 30.8% from 25 to 44, 24.7% from 45 to 64, and 13.8% who were 65 years of age or older. The median age was 38 years. For every 100 females, there were 96.5 males. For every 100 females age 18 and over, there were 94.7 males.

The median income for a household in the city was $41,577, and the median income for a family was $53,814. Males had a median income of $39,248 versus $29,694 for females. The per capita income for the city was $23,737. About 6.9% of families and 9.4% of the population were below the poverty line, including 13.1% of those under age 18 and 6.1% of those age 65 or over.

=== Crime ===
Burien
- Crime rates* (2023)

Violent crimes
- Homicide: 6
- Rape: 28
- Robbery: 108
- Aggravated assault: 124
- Total violent crime: 266

Property crimes
- Burglary: 369
- Larceny-theft: 930
- Motor vehicle theft: 783
- Arson: 21
- Total property crime: 2,103
- Note: Reported crimes per 100,000 population Source: 2023 FBI UCR Data

According to the Uniform Crime Report statistics compiled by the Federal Bureau of Investigation (FBI) in 2023, there were 266 violent crimes and 2,103 property crimes per 100,000 residents. Of these, the violent crimes consisted of 6 murders, 28 forcible rapes, 108 robberies and 124 aggravated assaults, while 369 burglaries, 930 larceny-thefts, 783 motor vehicle thefts and 21 acts of arson defined the property offenses.

== Government and infrastructure ==
Presidential Elections Results
Year	Republican	Democratic	Third Parties
2020	25.33% 6,292	71.98% 17,880	2.69% 667
2016	24.05% 4,892	67.14% 13,657	8.81% 1,791

In the 2020 U.S. presidential election, Burien cast 71.98% of its vote for Democrat Joe Biden.

Burien is a Council-Manager government. There are seven elected councilmembers. A mayor is chosen by the council from among the elected councilmembers. The City Manager is appointed by the council, and reports to the entire council.

Burien contracts with the King County Sheriff's Office for police services. Deputies assigned to Burien wear city uniforms and drive patrol cars marked with the city logo. According to the Chief of Police, there are currently 43 patrol officers, detectives, support personnel and a chief assigned full-time to the city.

== Education ==
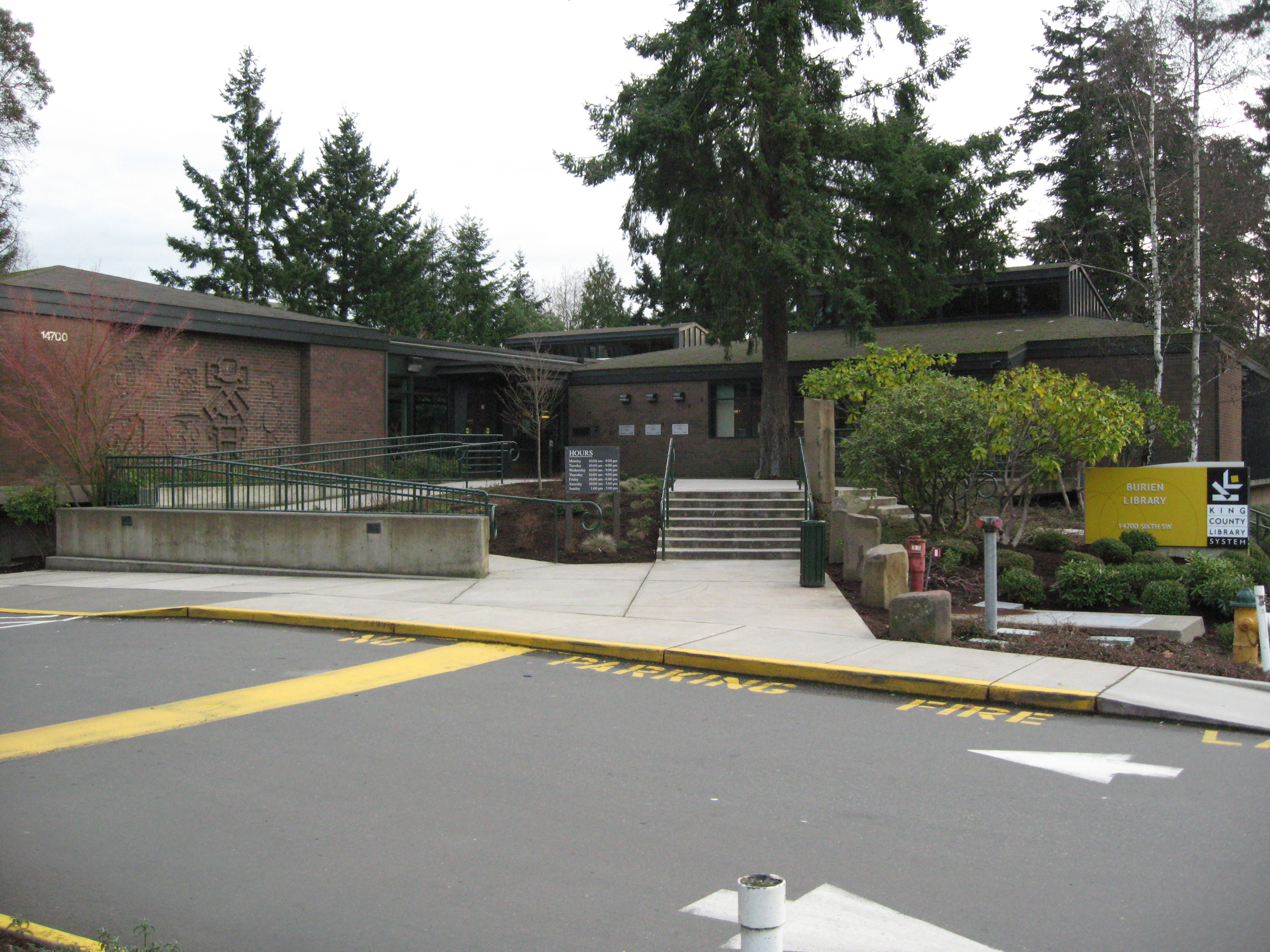
Old Burien Library

Burien is served by the Highline School District. High schools in Burien include Highline High School, Big Picture, CHOICE Academy, and the Puget Sound Skills Center. There are also many different middle schools in Burien, with St.Francis being a notable private school.John F. Kennedy Catholic High School is located in Burien.

In 1997 the city was subject to international media attention when Shorewood Elementary School teacher Mary Kay Letourneau raped one of her sixth grade students and became pregnant with his child. She was initially sentenced to six months imprisonment for her crimes, but having resumed raping her victim upon her release she triggered a seven year and five month prison sentence.

=== Media ===
The city is served by the Highline Times (established 1945), a community weekly newspaper owned by Robinson Newspapers. It is a subscriber-based publication with limited free distribution.

King County Library System operates the Burien Library. The current 32,000-square-foot (3,000 m^{2}) facility opened on June 13, 2009. The Boulevard Park Library is a smaller, community library (6,356 sq ft) in the Burien city limits. The 1971 facility is also operated by KCLS, with a history going back to 1937.

== Transportation ==
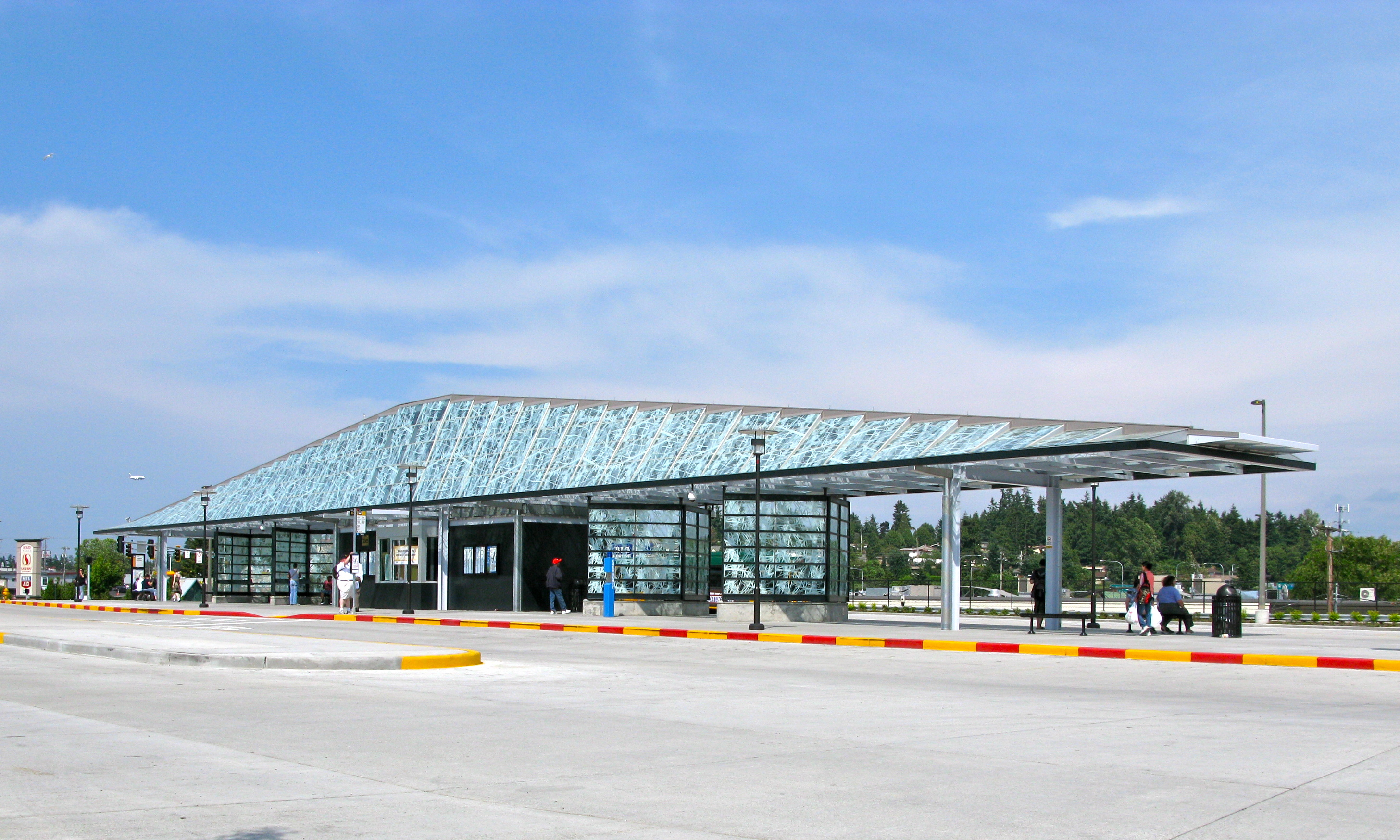
Burien Transit Center

King County Metro and Sound Transit operate public transportation services out of Burien, including buses that connect the city to Seattle–Tacoma International Airport, Bellevue, Downtown Seattle, West Seattle, Kent, Auburn, Renton, Normandy Park, Des Moines, and Tukwila. The Burien Transit Center began construction in July 2008 and finished in June 2009.

The city lies at the junction of State Route 509 and State Route 518, immediately northwest of the airport. Several major arterial streets connect downtown Burien to areas to the north, including Ambaum Boulevard and Des Moines Memorial Drive.

== Notable residents ==
- Jerry Cantrell, musician
- Sean Kinney, musician
- Kristina McMorris, author
- Ann Rule, true-crime author
- Anne Whitfield, actress

== See also ==
- Seahurst Park
