= Kristina McMorris =

American author

- Born: Burien, Washington, US
- Education: Pepperdine University (1995)
- Occupation: Novelist
- Writing career
- Years active: 2007–
- Genre: Historical fiction
- Website: www.kristinamcmorris.com

Kristina McMorris is an American author of several New York Times, USA Today, and Wall Street Journal bestselling books and a former actress. Her works of fiction include two novellas and seven historical novels, most notably the million-copy bestseller Sold on a Monday.

McMorris's debut novel, Letters from Home, was originally inspired by her grandparents' WWII courtship letters. The book was a 2013 nominee for the RITA Award.

Kristina's novels have earned more than two dozen national literary awards and nominations, including the IMPAC Dublin Literary Award and Goodreads Choice Award for Best Historical Fiction.

As a child actress, she starred in Sandra Peabody’s Emmy-winning children’s educational series Popcorn (1985-1992).

== Works ==
=== Novels ===
- Letters from Home (2011)
- Bridge of Scarlet Leaves (2012)
- The Pieces We Keep (2013)
- The Edge of Lost (2015)
- Sold on a Monday (2018)
- The Ways We Hide (2023)
- When We Had Wings (2023)
- The Girls of Good Fortune (2025)

=== Novellas/Anthologies ===
- "The Christmas Collector" in A Winter Wonderland (2012)
- "The Reunion" in Grand Central (2014)
