= Boulevard Park, Washington =

- Census-designated place
- Location within Washington (state) Location within the United States
- Coordinates: 47°30′49″N 122°18′58″W
- Country: United States
- State: Washington
- County: King

Area
  - Total: 1.614 sq mi (4.180 km^{2})
  - Land: 1.539 sq mi (3.986 km^{2})
  - Water: 0.075 sq mi (0.194 km^{2})
- Elevation: 157 ft (48 m)

Population (2010)
  - Total: 4,904
  - Density: 3,435/sq mi (1,326.4/km^{2})
- Time zone: UTC-8 (Pacific (PST))
  - Summer (DST): UTC-7 (PDT)
- GNIS feature ID: 2584949
- FIPS code: 53-07397

Boulevard Park is a census-designated place (CDP) in King County, Washington, United States. As of the 2020 census, Boulevard Park had a population of 4,094. Boulevard Park was part of the Riverton-Boulevard Park CDP in 2000 but was split for the 2010 census into its own CDP.

== Geography ==
Boulevard Park is bordered to the north by Seattle, to the east by Tukwila, to the south by Burien, and to the west by the White Center CDP. Washington State Route 99 cuts across the northeast part of the community, and State Route 509 forms the boundary between Boulevard Park and White Center. Downtown Seattle is 8 miles (13 km) to the north, and Seattle–Tacoma International Airport is 5 miles (8 km) to the south.

According to the United States Census Bureau, the Boulevard Park CDP has a total area of 1.614 square miles (4.18 km^{2}), of which 1.539 square miles (3.99 km^{2}) are land and 0.075 square miles (0.19 km^{2}), or 4.65%, are water.

== Education ==
Portions of Boulevard Park are in the Highline School District while other parts are in Seattle Public Schools.

== Demographics ==
Historical population
Census	Pop.	Note	%±
2010	5,287		—
2020	4,904		−7.2%
U.S. Decennial Census; 2000 2010

Boulevard Park first appeared as a census designated place in the 2010 U.S. census formed from part of deleted Riverton-Boulevard Park CDP.

=== Racial and ethnic composition ===
Boulevard Park CDP, Washington – Racial and ethnic composition Note: the US Census treats Hispanic/Latino as an ethnic category. This table excludes Latinos from the racial categories and assigns them to a separate category. Hispanics/Latinos may be of any race.
Race / Ethnicity (NH = Non-Hispanic)	Pop 2010	Pop 2020	% 2010	% 2020
White alone (NH)	2,068	1,625	39.11%	39.69%
Black or African American alone (NH)	788	471	14.90%	11.50%
Native American or Alaska Native alone (NH)	70	29	1.32%	0.71%
Asian alone (NH)	599	497	11.33%	12.14%
Native Hawaiian or Pacific Islander alone (NH)	129	89	2.44%	2.17%
Other race alone (NH)	17	11	0.32%	0.27%
Mixed race or Multiracial (NH)	225	236	4.26%	5.76%
Hispanic or Latino (any race)	1,391	1,136	26.31%	27.75%
Total	5,287	4,094	100.00%	100.00%
