= Three Tree Point =

Coordinates: 47°27′1″N 122°22′56″W

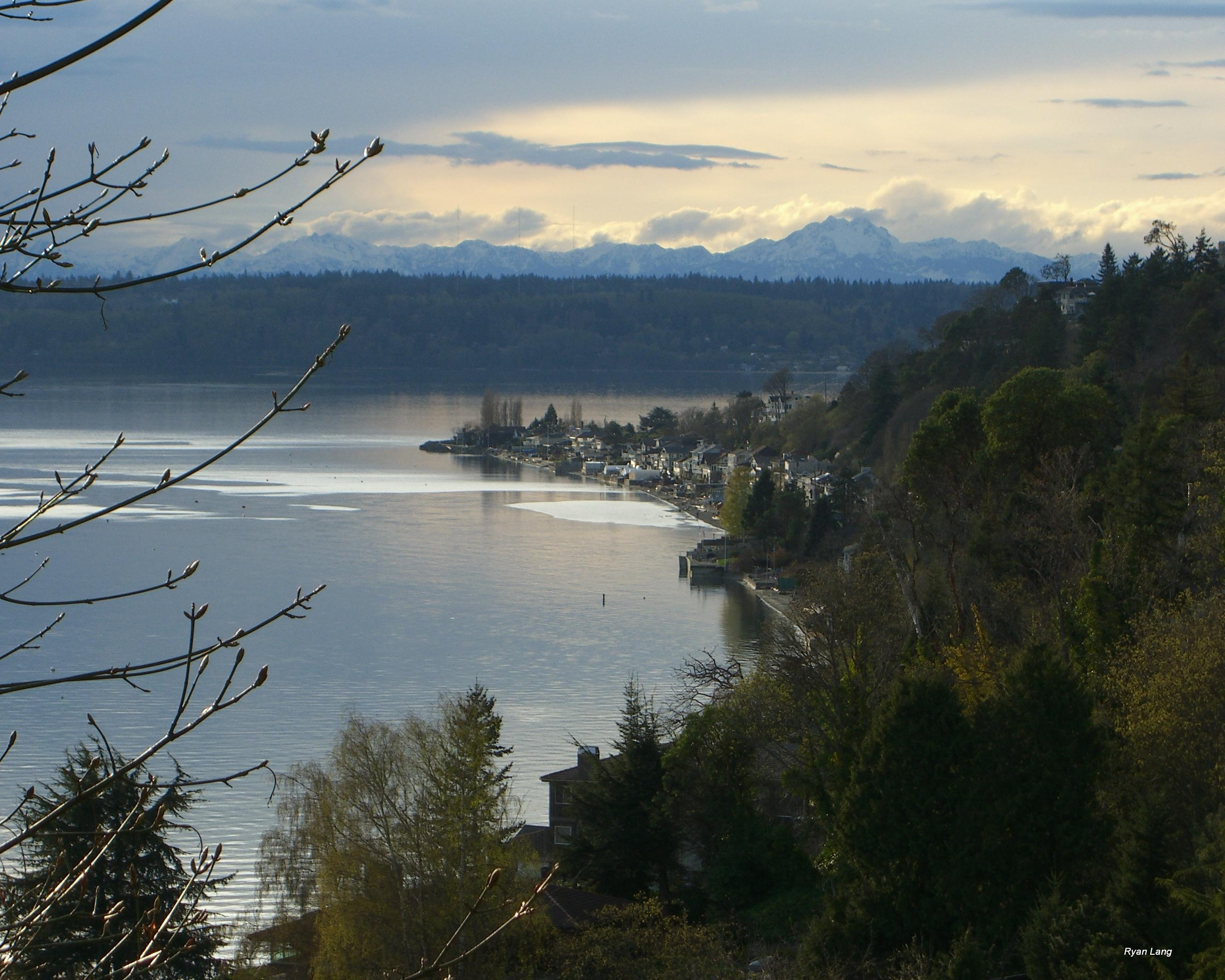
Three Tree Point, from the south looking west across Puget Sound towards the Olympic Mountains

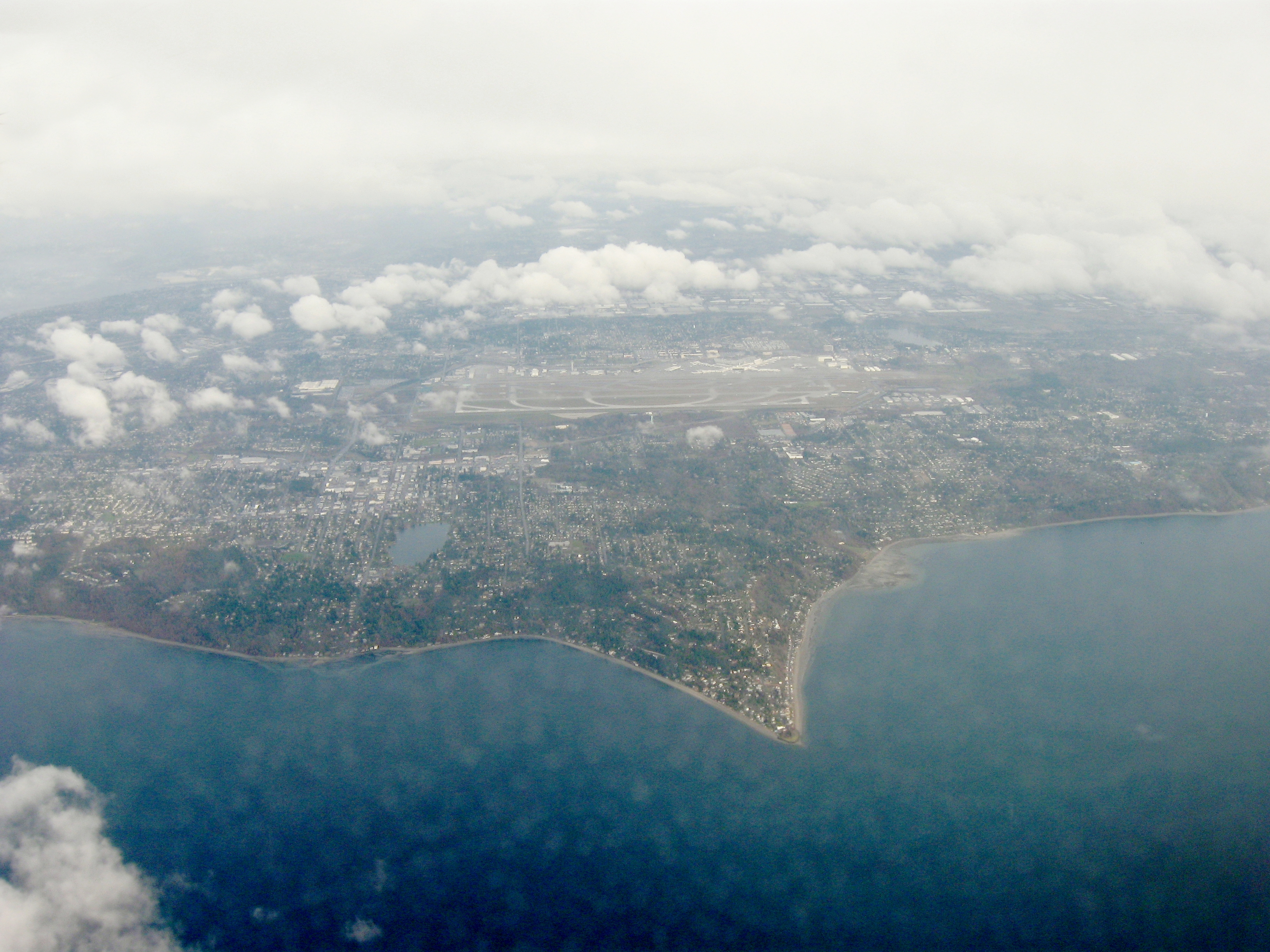
Aerial view of Three Tree Point with Burien and Seattle-Tacoma International Airport.

Three Tree Point is a low, gravelly, triangle-shaped spit jutting into the east side of Puget Sound. It is referred to on some navigation charts as "Point Pully", in recognition of crew member Robert Pulley of the Wilkes Expedition.

== History ==
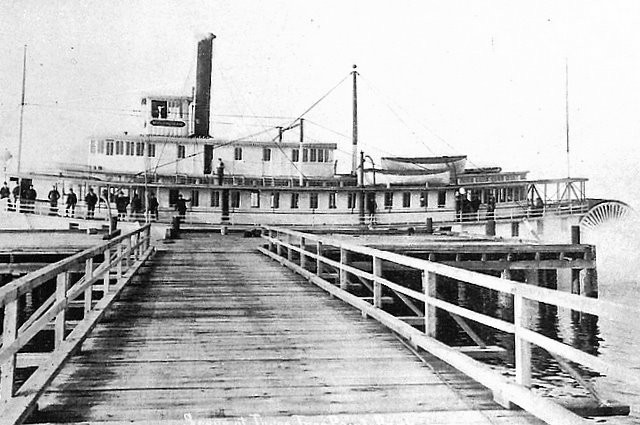
Sternwheeler Multnomah at dock at Three Tree Point, Puget Sound, Washington, sometime before 1909.

In early years of development on Three Tree Point, a dock was built on the north beach. The area then was primarily used as for resort or summer homes and cabins. As the area grew with more permanent residents, a clubhouse called "The Cove" was built with a tennis court and dance floor area, which was used frequently for events, parties, etc. During the early years of World War II, lookouts would take turns in the light tower, searching the skies for possible enemy planes.

Today, Three Tree Point is a densely populated residential area where much attention has been paid toward tree preservation. The surrounding waters are popular among scuba divers.

== See also ==
- Burien, Washington
