= Capital City (sternwheeler) =

American steamboat built in 1898

- Capital City in 1904. (Asahel Curtis photograph)

History
- Name: Capital City
- Owner: Canadian Pacific Railway
- Route: Puget Sound
- Builder: E.G. Rathbown
- Completed: 1898, Port Blakely
- Out of service: 1919
- Identification: US registry #157507
- Fate: Broken up in 1919.

General characteristics
- Tonnage: 522.8 gross; 348.2 registered
- Length: 150.2 ft (45.8 m)
- Beam: 32 ft (9.8 m)
- Depth: 7 ft (2.1 m) depth of hold
- Installed power: twin steam engines, horizontally mounted
- Propulsion: sternwheel

Capital City was a sternwheel steamboat of the Puget Sound Mosquito Fleet. The vessel was originally named Dalton.

== Career ==
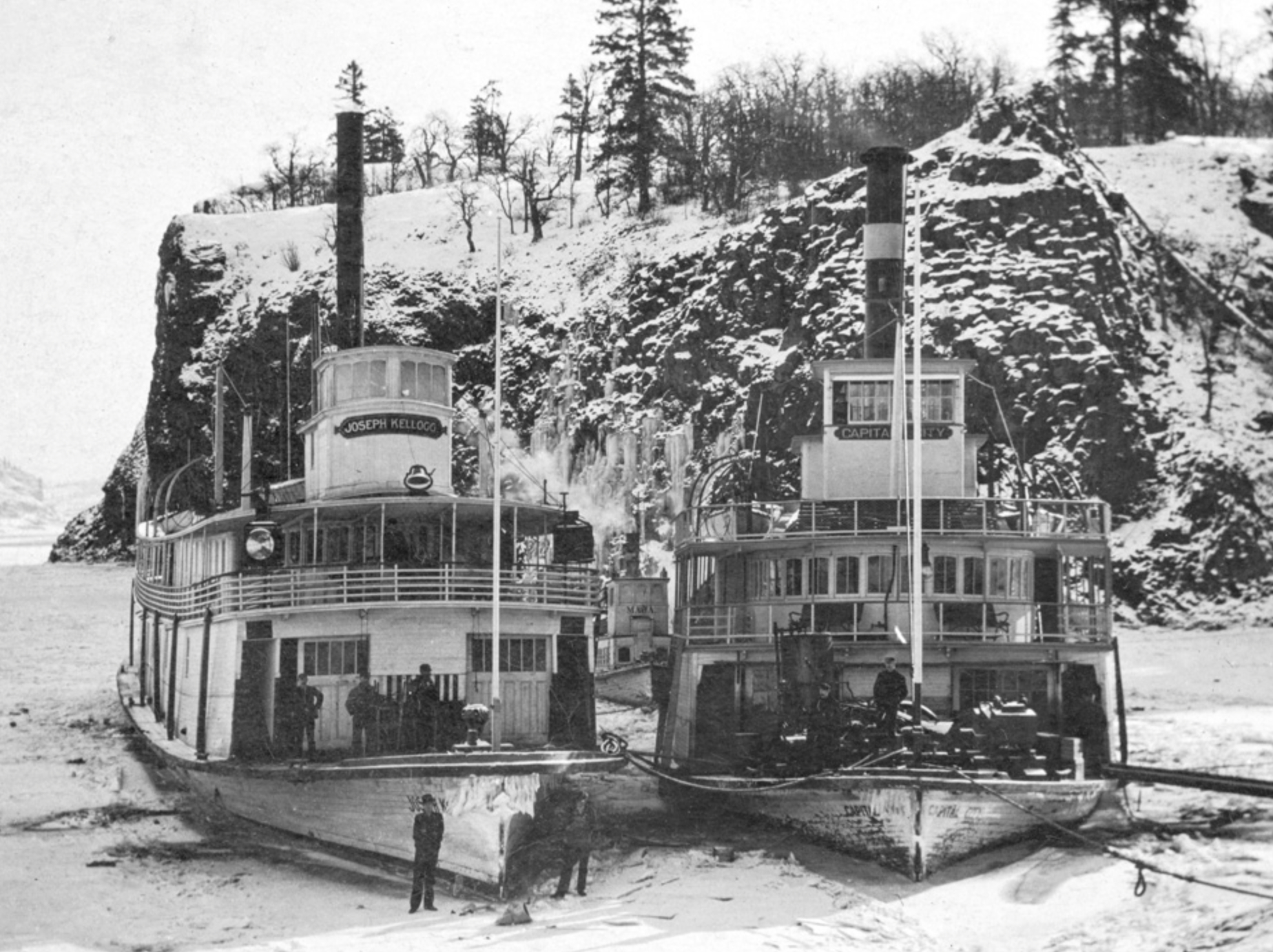
Steam ship Capital City (right) stuck in ice, January 1907

Capital City was built in 1898 at Port Blakely at the Hall Brothers shipyard. This vessel was originally owned by Canadian Pacific Ry. and was acquired by White Pass in 1901, but was not used under White Pass ownership. The vessel was sold to S. Willey Steamship & Navigation Co. and renamed Capital City in 1901. The vessel was resold to McDonald Steamship Co. in 1903, resold to Olympia-Tacoma Navigation Co. in 1904, and resold again to Dallas, Portland & Astoria Navigation Co. in 1906. Broken up in 1919. The vessel was originally named for John "Jack" Dalton (1856–1944), an Alaskan packer.
