= Riverton-Boulevard Park, Washington =

- former CDP
- Location of Riverton-Boulevard Park, Washington
- Coordinates: 47°30′27″N 122°18′41″W
- Country: United States
- State: Washington
- County: King

Area
  - Total: 2.8 sq mi (7.2 km^{2})
  - Land: 2.7 sq mi (7.1 km^{2})
  - Water: 0.077 sq mi (0.2 km^{2})

Population (2000)
  - Total: 11,188
  - Density: 4,104/sq mi (1,584.7/km^{2})
- Time zone: UTC-8 (Pacific (PST))
  - Summer (DST): UTC-7 (PDT)
- FIPS code: 53-58878

Riverton-Boulevard Park is a former census-designated place (CDP) in King County, Washington, United States. The population was 11,188 at the 2000 census. For the 2010 census, the CDP was separated into the Riverton and Boulevard Park CDPs, with part of the area now being in the city of Tukwila.

== Geography ==
Riverton-Boulevard Park is located at 47°30′27″N 122°18′41″W (47.507571, -122.311321).

According to the United States Census Bureau, the CDP had a total area of 2.8 square miles (7.2 km^{2}), of which, 2.7 square miles (7.1 km^{2}) of it is land and 0.1 square miles (0.2 km^{2}) of it (2.15%) is water.

== Demographics ==
Historical population
Census	Pop.	Note	%±
1980	14,182		—
1990	15,337		8.1%
2000	11,188		−27.1%

As of the census of 2000, there were 11,188 people, 4,440 households, and 2,579 families residing in the CDP. The population density was 4,104.5 people per square mile (1,582.3/km^{2}). There were 4,662 housing units at an average density of 1,710.3/sq mi (659.3/km^{2}). The racial makeup of the CDP was 61.15% White, 8.30% African American, 1.45% Native American, 11.99% Asian, 1.72% Pacific Islander, 9.63% from other races, and 5.76% from two or more races. Hispanic or Latino of any race were 15.69% of the population.

There were 4,440 households, out of which 29.5% had children under the age of 18 living with them, 39.4% were married couples living together, 12.6% had a female householder with no husband present, and 41.9% were non-families. 32.5% of all households were made up of individuals, and 9.0% had someone living alone who was 65 years of age or older. The average household size was 2.51 and the average family size was 3.21.

In the CDP, the population was spread out, with 25.0% under the age of 18, 10.1% from 18 to 24, 33.5% from 25 to 44, 20.8% from 45 to 64, and 10.5% who were 65 years of age or older. The median age was 33 years. For every 100 females, there were 104.4 males. For every 100 females age 18 and over, there were 104.7 males.

The median income for a household in the CDP was $39,034, and the median income for a family was $45,567. Males had a median income of $32,936 versus $27,828 for females. The per capita income for the CDP was $18,523. About 9.4% of families and 11.6% of the population were below the poverty line, including 15.2% of those under age 18 and 8.7% of those age 65 or over.
