= List of crossings of the Puyallup River =

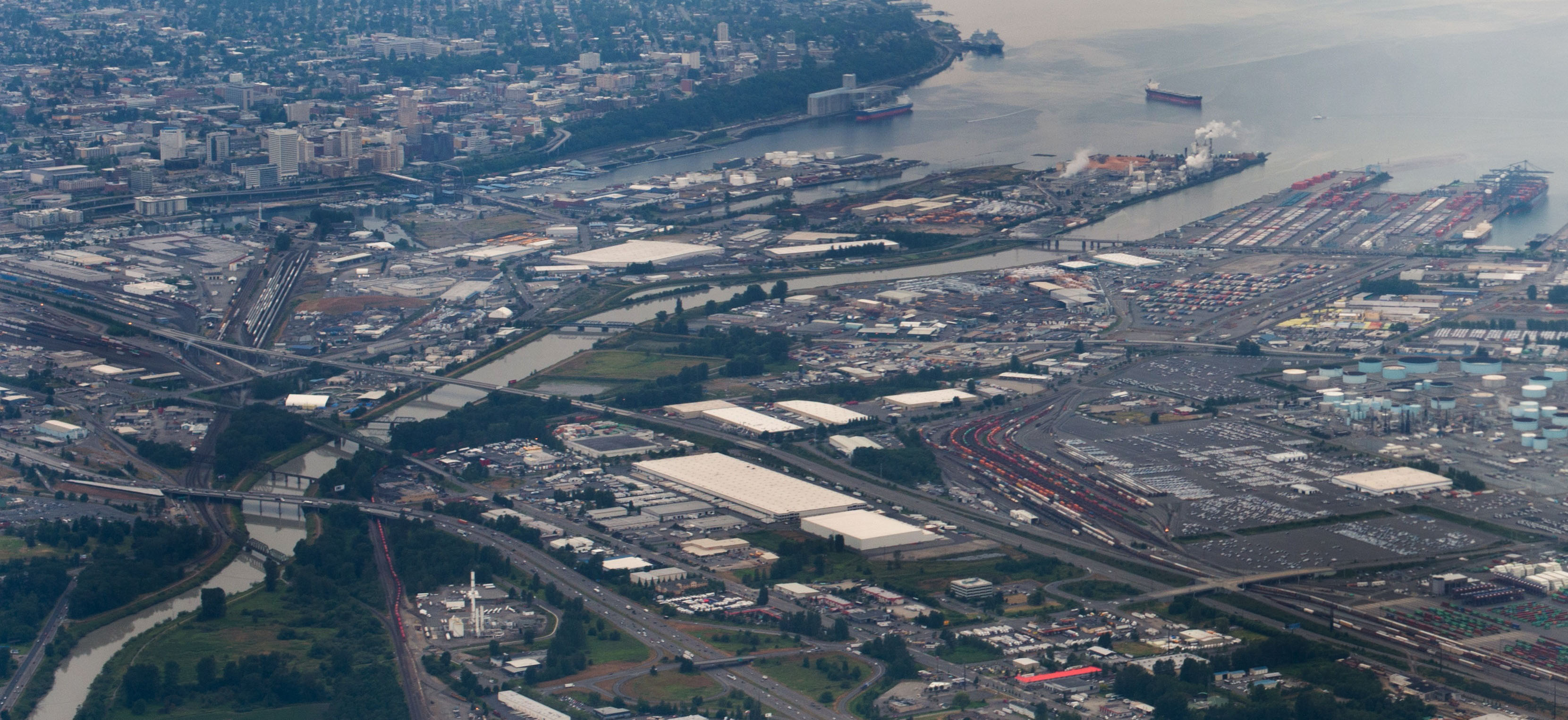
Aerial photo of Lower Puyallup River crossings in City of Tacoma (Interstate 5 near lower left corner, Commencement Bay in upper right)

This is a list of bridges and other crossings of the Puyallup River from Puget Sound upstream to its source, the Puyallup Glacier on Mount Rainier.

== Crossings ==
Photo	Crossing	River mile	Carries	Location	Coordinates
Commencement Bay, Puget Sound 47.268°N 122.427°W
	Puyallup Waterway Bridge / East 11th Street Bridge		East 11th Street (until July 2014)	Tacoma, Washington	47.2601°N 122.4188°W
	Unnamed pipeline crossing	0.8	Sewer pipeline?	Tacoma, Washington	47.2499°N 122.4144°W
	Lincoln Avenue Bridge		Lincoln Avenue	Tacoma, Washington	47°15′00″N 122°24′51″W
	SR 509 Bridge		Washington State Route 509	Tacoma, Washington	47°14′45″N 122°24′31″W
	BNSF Puyallup River bridge (below Eells St Bridge)		BNSF Railroad	Tacoma, Washington	47.2442°N 122.4067°W
	Eells Street Viaduct/Puyallup Avenue Bridge (center of image)		Eells Street	Tacoma, Washington	47.243°N 122.405°W
	Old Milwaukee Road Bridge (above Eells St Bridge)		Tacoma Rail line, former Milwaukee Road	Tacoma, Washington	47.242°N 122.403°W
	Interstate 5 Puyallup River Bridge		Interstate 5	Tacoma, Washington	47°14′27″N 122°24′01″W
	Union Pacific Puyallup River Bridge		Union Pacific Railroad	Tacoma, Washington	47.239°N 122.397°W
	George Milroy Bridge		66th Ave E	Fife, Washington	47.214°N 122.341°W
	Meridian Street Bridge (SR 167 Puyallup River Bridge) (old 1925–2015 bridge shown)		Washington State Route 161/Washington State Route 167	Puyallup, Washington	47.203°N 122.294°W
	Veterans Memorial Bridge (Milwaukee Bridge)		Milwaukee Ave	Puyallup	47.199°N 122.287°W
			Washington State Route 512	Puyallup	47.194°N 122.283°W
			East Main Street	Puyallup	47.197°N 122.251°W
	BNSF bridge		BNSF railroad, Amtrak	Puyallup	47.197°N 122.250°W
			Washington State Route 162	South Hill, Washington	47.185°N 122.229°W
			96th Street East	Near Alderton, Washington	47.170°N 122.216°W
			Colburn–McCutcheon Road	Near McMillin, Washington	47.140°N 122.227°W
	Tacoma Water pipeline bridge		Tacoma Water pipeline #2	Near McMillin, Washington	47.1399°N 122.2267°W
	McMillin Foothill's Trail Bridge		Foothills Trail	McMillin, Washington	47.1297°N 122.2362°W
	Historic McMillin Bridge		Washington State Route 162	McMillin, Washington	47.1302°N 122.2353°W
	McMillin Bridge		Washington State Route 162	McMillin, Washington	47.1297°N 122.2356°W
	Orting Kapowsin Highway E		Calistoga Street	Orting, Washington	47.089°N 122.214°W
	Kapowsin Road Bridge		Orville Road	Near Graham, Washington	47.039°N 122.206°W
	Unnamed bridge		Private gravel mine road?	Near Graham, Washington	47.000°N 122.192°W
Puyallup River Canyon (RM 21–26 ) (Note: Location of Puyallup River Canyon PRKM 27–35 from Czuba et al.)
	Electron Diversion Dam (Electron Hydroelectric Project)		N/A	Near Electron, Washington	46°54′23″N 122°02′22″W
	Unnamed private bridge		Electron diversion dam access road (private)	Near Electron, Washington	46.903°N 122.035°W
	Unnamed bridge		Hancock Forest Management 2-to-7 connector road	Kapowsin Timberlands, above Mowich River near Mount Rainier National Park	46.885°N 122.006°W
Mount Rainier National Park
	South Puyallup River Bridge		Westside Road	Mount Rainier National Park	46.808°N 121.891°W
	Wonderland Trail single-log bridge (Nisqually River shown)	c. 43	Wonderland Trail	Mount Rainier National Park	46.8126°N 121.8688°W
Puyallup Glacier (North Puyallup River) Tahoma Glacier (South Puyallup River)46.82°N 121.84°W

== See also ==
- List of crossings of the Columbia River
