= Puyallup =

Puyallup may refer to:

- Puyallup people, a Coast Salish people
- Puyallup Tribe of Indians, a federally-recognized tribe
- Puyallup, Washington, a city
  - Puyallup High School
  - Puyallup School District
  - Puyallup station, a Sounder commuter rail station
  - Washington State Fair, formerly the Puyallup Fair
- Puyallup River, a river in the U.S. state of Washington
- Lake Puyallup, developed along the south edge of the Puget Sound Glacier
- Puyallup Glacier, a glacier on the west flank of Mount Rainier in Washington
- MV Puyallup, a Washington State ferry
- Puyallup (YT-806), a United States Navy Valiant-class harbor tug
