= Tokaloo Rock =

Mountain in Washington (state), United States

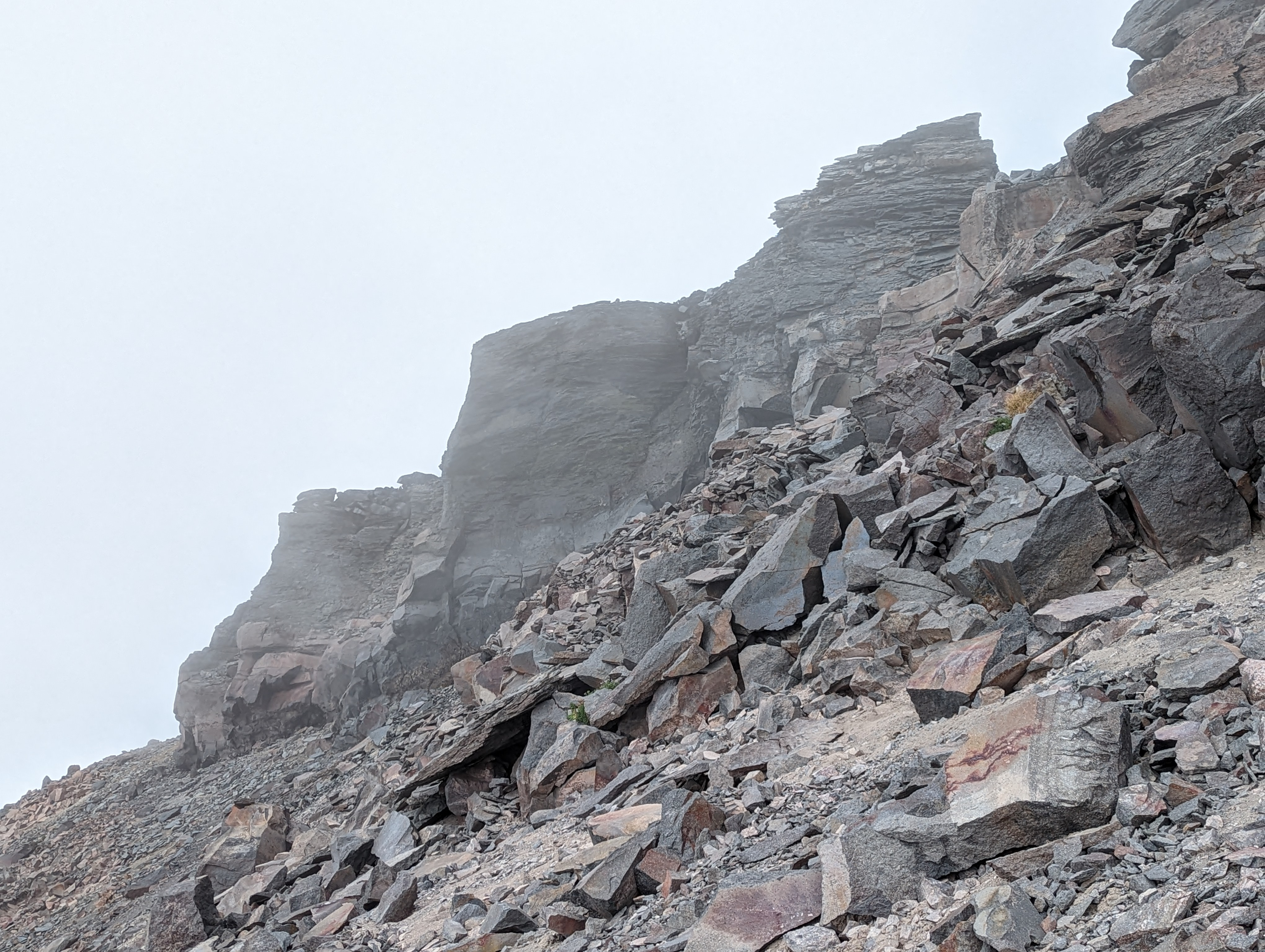
- Looking up at the Tokaloo Rock summit

Highest point
- Elevation: 7,688 ft (2,343 m)
- Prominence: 204 ft (62 m)
- Parent peak: Glacier Island (7,690 ft)
- Isolation: 1.45 mi (2.33 km)
- Coordinates: 46°50′22″N 121°50′26″W

Geography
- Location within Washington (state) Location within the United States
- Location: Mount Rainier National Park; Pierce County, Washington, US
- Parent range: Cascades

Climbing
- Easiest route: scrambling from St. Andrew's Park, off of the Wonderland Trail

Tokaloo Rock is a 7,688 feet (2,343 m) mountain located in Mount Rainier National Park, in Pierce County of Washington state. It is part of the Cascade Range, and lies 4 mi (6.4 km) west of the summit of Mount Rainier, near the head of the North Puyallup River and at the foot of the Puyallup Glacier. The Wonderland Trail provides an approach to this mountain, and the summit offers views of Mount Rainier's Puyallup and Tahoma glaciers. Glacier Island is its nearest higher neighbor, 1.45 mi (2.33 km) to the southeast. Tokaloo Spire is a pillar adjacent to Tokaloo Rock and rises to an elevation of 7,471 feet (2,277 m).

== History ==
Tokaloo Rock's name was officially adopted in 1932 by the United States Board on Geographic Names.

== Climate ==
Tokaloo Rock is located in the marine west coast climate zone of western North America. Most weather fronts originate in the Pacific Ocean, and travel northeast toward the Cascade Mountains. As fronts approach, they are forced upward by the peaks of the Cascade Range (Orographic lift), causing them to drop their moisture in the form of rain or snowfall onto the Cascades. As a result, the west side of the Cascades experiences high precipitation, especially during the winter months in the form of snowfall. During winter months, weather is usually cloudy, but, due to high-pressure systems over the Pacific Ocean that intensify during summer months, there is often little or no cloud cover during the summer.

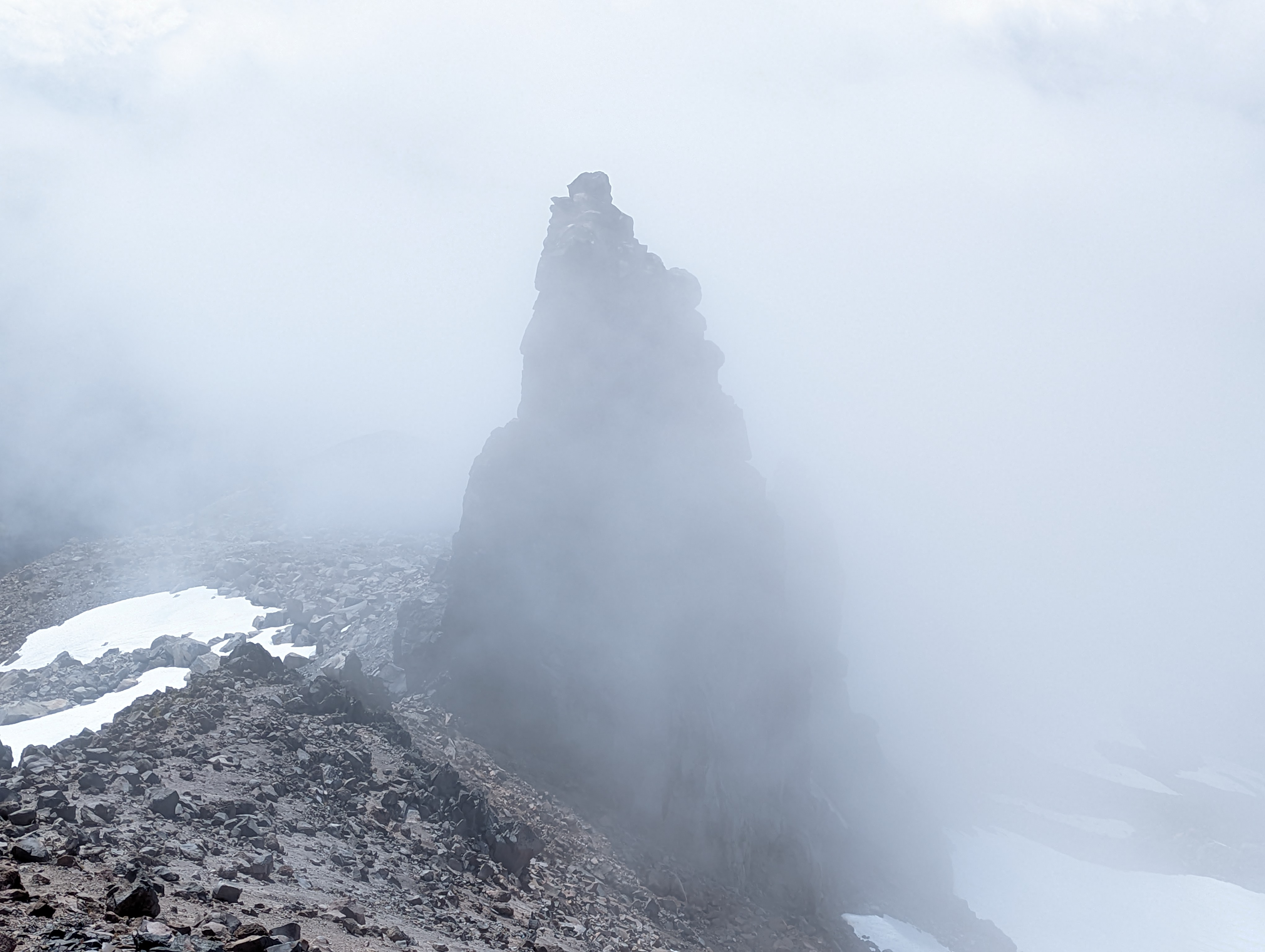
Tokaloo Spire shrouded in clouds

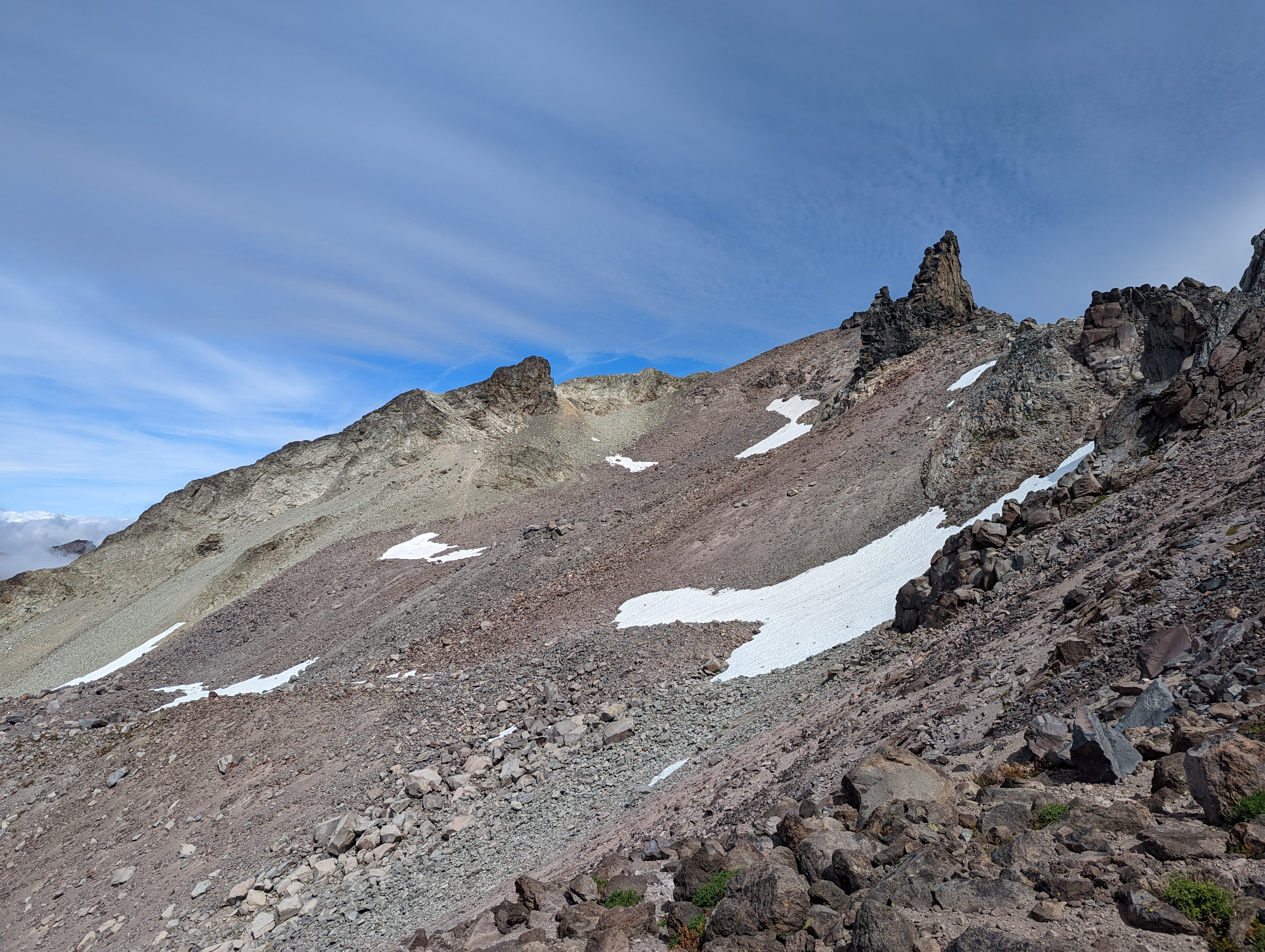
Approaching Tokaloo Spire. Tokaloo Rock's summit is hidden beyond the ridge.

== See also ==
- Geology of the Pacific Northwest
