= Ohop Valley =

Unincorporated community in Washington, United States

- Region
- Interactive map of Ohop Valley
- Coordinates: 47°5′46″N 122°12′19″W
- Country: United States
- State: Washington
- County: Pierce
- Time zone: UTC-8 (Pacific (PST))
  - Summer (DST): UTC-7 (PDT)
- ZIP Code: 98360
- Area code(s): 360, 564
- FIPS code: 53-52005
- GNIS feature ID: 1512539

Ohop Valley is an agricultural region in Pierce County, Washington, United States. It is located between Electron and Eatonville, and contains the unincorporated settlement of Ohop. Ohop Creek, which runs through the valley, feeds into Ohop Lake and its waters eventually join the Puyallup River.

Prior to settlement in the 1880s by Norwegian immigrants, the area was owned by local Native Americans who assisted new farmers. The town of Ohop also had a small mineral spring that was used to bring tourists to the area, along with its views of nearby Mount Rainier. The Ohop Valley also remains a hub for local logging.

Part of the valley is now owned by a land trust managed by the Nisqually Indian Tribe to restore salmon habitat near Ohop Creek. One of the historic barns in the Ohop Valley was acquired by the Eatonville School District and is planned to house a STEM agricultural education campus.
