= Lake Puyallup =

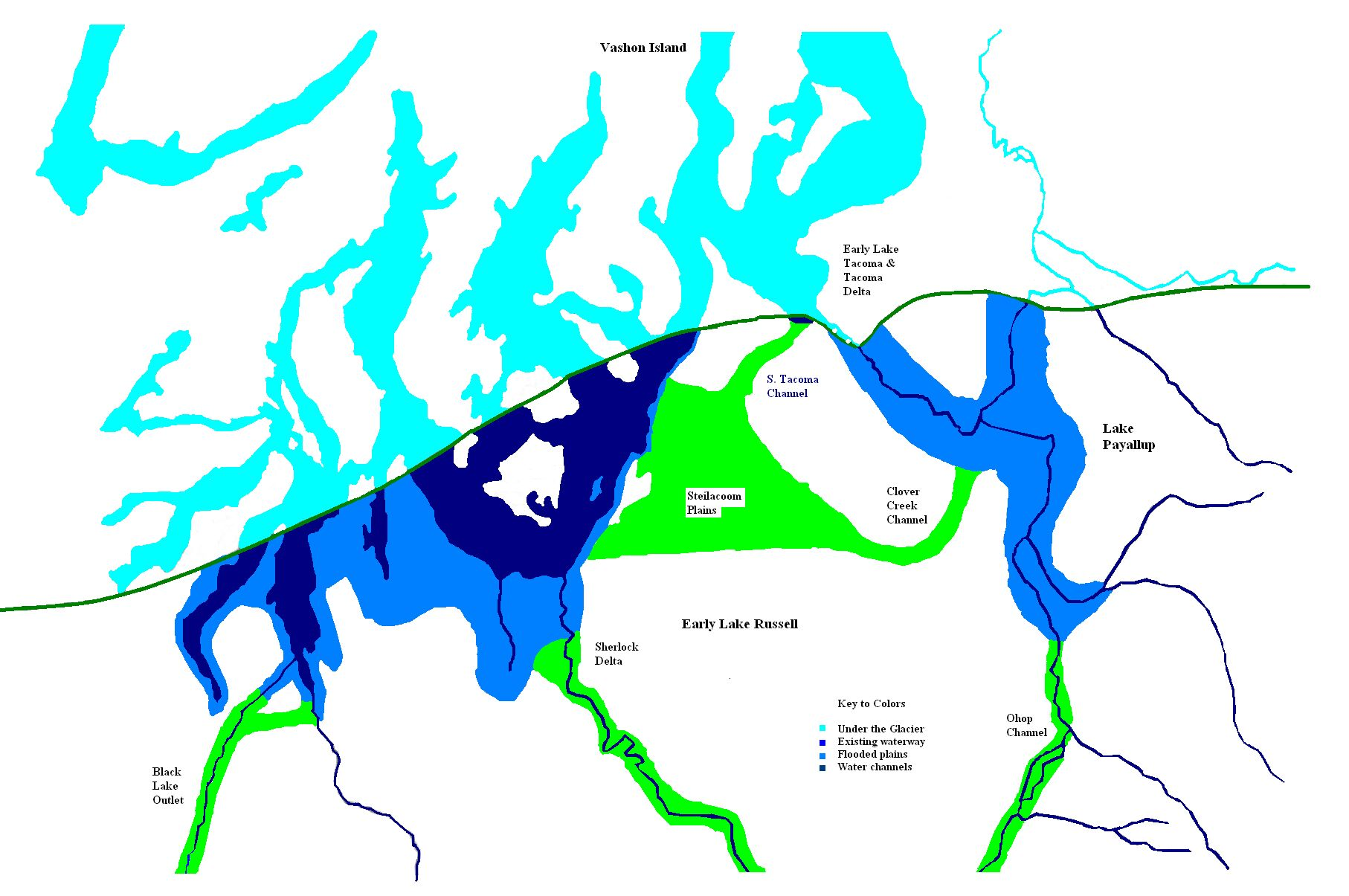
- Glacial lakes Lake Puyallup & Early Lake Russell

- Location within Washington (state)
- Location: Puyallup River; Pierce County, Washington
- Coordinates: 47.223655°N 122.344414°W
- Lake type: Glacial lake (former)
- Primary inflows: Vashon Glacier
- Primary outflows: Ohop channel
- Basin countries: United States
- Max. length: 17 miles (27 km)
- Max. width: 9 miles (14 km)
- Max. depth: 595 feet (181 m)
- Residence time: less than 200 years
- Surface elevation: 350 m (1,150 ft)

Lake Puyallup developed along the south edge of the Puget Sound Glacier. The glacier was in retreat northward after having reached its most southerly point. Drainage off the north face of Mount Rainier and the melting ice of the glacier was trapped in the valley of the Puyallup River. As the glacier moved north, the lake grew until it reached its largest capacity with the glacier at the glacial front across the Puyallup valley just south of Commencement Bay at Tacoma and northern bend of the White River at Auburn. When the ice retreated further north, it was reduced in depth and volume and takes on the name of Lake Tacoma.

== The Ohop Channel ==
Lake Puyallup initial drain was south through the Ohop channel. The Ohop served as the drain for the Carbon and Puyallup rivers to the Nisqually. The divide between the future north-flowing rivers and the Nisqually was Lake Kapowsin at 595 feet (181 m) above sea level. From Lake Kapowsin, the valley of Ohop Creek, through Ohop Lake to the Nisqually. The pass between the Puyallup River and Lake Kapowsin is 500 feet (150 m) wide and 340 feet (100 m) deep. At Eatonville, it is 200 feet (61 m) deep and perhaps 2,000 feet (610 m) wide. Between the pass and Eatonville, the valley descends about 14 feet (4.3 m) to the mile (0.6 km). Beyond Eatonville the grade is about 10 feet (3.0 m) to the mile (0.6 km). The west side of the Puyallup trough stands about 550 feet (170 m) above sea level south of Orting to a 3 miles (4.8 km) north. West of this was the low land draining towards Lake Russell, thus blocking this westward drain. This remained the outflow until the glacier retreated further north, opening a new lower channel at Clover Creek.

== See also ==
- Glacial Lake Russell
