= Lake Skokomish =

Lake Skokomish, Lake Hood
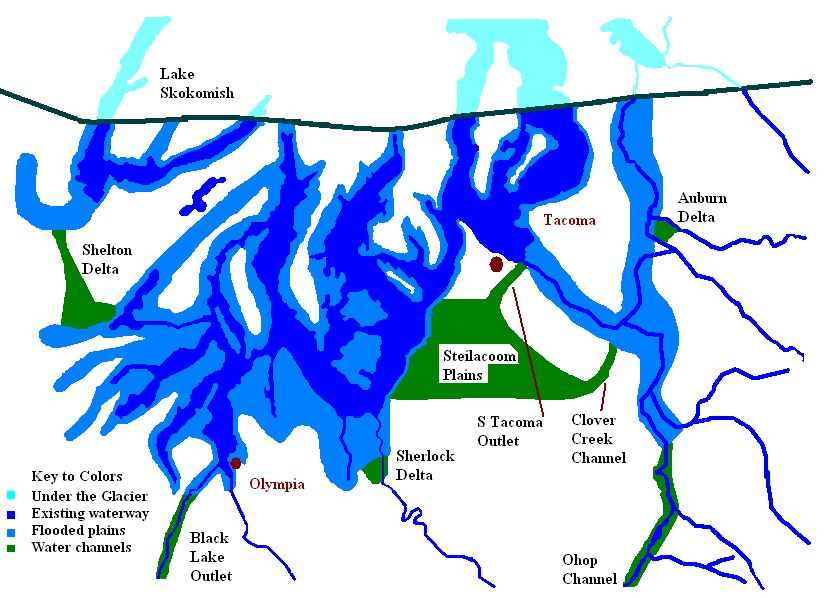
- Glacial Lakes Skokomish & Russell in the Puget Sound basin.

- Location within Washington (state)
- Location: Hood Canal; Kitsap County, Washington
- Coordinates: 47.363322°N 123.127485°W
- Lake type: Glacial lake (former)
- Primary inflows: Cordilleran Ice Cap
- Primary outflows: Shelton Delta, Shelton, Washington; Clifton Channel, North Bay of Case Inlet; Poulsbo Channel, Poulsbo, Washington
- Catchment area: Hood Canal
- Basin countries: United States
- Average depth: 160 ft (49 m)
- Max. depth: 350 ft (110 m)
- Surface elevation: 350 m (1,150 ft)
- References: Washington Geological Survey, Bulletin No. 8; Glaciation of the Puget Sound Region; J. Harlen Bretz; Olympia, Wash, Frank M. Lamborn Public Printer; 1913

During the Vashon Glaciation a series of lakes formed along the southern margin of the Cordilleran Ice Cap. In the Hood Canal depression, two significant lake stages existed, Lake Skokomish and Lake Hood. Early Lake Skokomish's surface was at 350 ft (110 m) above sea level, draining across the divide at Shelton, Washington into early Glacial Lake Russell. As the glacier receded northward, this freshwater lake grew in size, until the ice was north of the Clifton channel. With the opening of the Clifton channel, the water dropped to 160 m (520 ft) above sea level. This longer and lower level lake is referred to as Lake Hood. The glacier continued to recede northward until it reached the Poulsbo channel. Here, the water level equalized to Glacial Lake Russell no longer having a separate identify.

== Lake Skokomish ==
Lake Skokomish formed in the depression of the Hood Canal and the Skokomish River. It drained across a southern divide at Shelton, Washington. When this outflow joined Lake Russell, it formed the Shelton Delta. This outlet was approximately 350 feet (110 m) above sea level. As the glacier receded northward, a lower outlet at Clifton, opened into Lake Russell at Cases Inlet (North Bay) Lake Hood The second and lower stage of this water body formed when the ice was far enough north to open the Clifton outlet. It continued until the glacier reached the Poulsbo Channel. Here, Lake Russell and Lake Hood equalized and became one lake.

The Clifton Channel: The Clifton outlet channel is a definite feature across the divide on which it lies. It is 60 feet (18 m) deep at Lake Deborah in the col, 220 feet (67 m) above tide. This lake now drains both to Cases Inlet and Hood Canal. Gravel terraces exist along the channel, and one terrace on the east side continues as a small channel directly eastward to Cases Inlet. The Clifton channel ends in the forest west of Allyn, 160 feet (49 m) above tide, corresponding with the dominant water plane of Lake Russell.

The Brinnon Delta: The only delta of Vashon age known in the valley of Hood Canal is at the mouth of the Dusewallips River, on the north side of the valley. At the seaward upper margin, it is 120 feet (37 m) above the Sound. Its altitude makes it obviously a feature produced subsequent to Lake Hood, whose waters were 100 feet (30 m) higher.

The Poulsbo Channel: The Kitsap County peninsula between Hood Canal and Admiralty Inlet is sufficiently high to have confined Lake Hood as far north as Breidablik, northwest of Dogfish (Liberty) Bay. A meridional trough of the pre-Vashon topography, styled the Poulsbo Valley in this paper (locally called Big Valley), crosses the peninsula here. A swampy pass occurs midway of its length at an altitude of 120 feet (37 m), and a stream terrace lies on the eastern side of the valley near the pass, at an altitude of 150 feet (46 m). In the Poulsbo Valley, Lake Hood appears to have found an outlet lower than the Clifton channel, and to have entered Lake Russell at the head of Dogfish (Liberty) Bay. The Brinnon Delta is to be correlated with the 120 feet (37 m) level of Lake Russell. The two lakes may be considered as one at this stage, Lake Hood sinking by erosion of the Poulsbo channel to the level of Lake Russell, and becoming an arm of it. If the ice dam causing Lake Russell remained effective during the next few miles of retreat, as there is good reason for believing, Lake Russell levels obtained in Hood Canal with broad connection across the low northern tip of Kitsap County peninsula, a few miles north of the Poulsbo channel. Lack of Vashon Deltas of Olympic Rivers The Olympic Mountains have several streams leading into Hood Canal, which have no valley deltas at the levels of the glacial lakes. The valley of Quilcene River has a long gravel slope gradually descending from levels above Lake Russell to tidewater. The Duckabush Valley, the Hama Hama and Skokomish rivers show no evidence of glacially derived deltas. It appears the later erosion regraded the Pleistocene gravels of these valleys.

== Lake Hood ==
The second and lower stage of this water body formed when the ice was far enough north to open the Clifton outlet. It continued until the glacier reached the Poulsbo Channel. Here, Lake Russell and Lake Hood equalized and became one lake.

== See also ==
- Glacial Lake Russell
