= Nisqually =

Nisqually, Niskwalli, or Nisqualli may refer to:

== People ==
- Nisqually people, a Coast Salish ethnic group
- Nisqually Indian Tribe of the Nisqually Reservation, federally recognized tribe
  - Nisqually Indian Reservation, the tribe's reservation in Thurston County
  - Nisqually language, a Southern Puget Sound Salish

== Places ==
- Billy Frank Jr. Nisqually National Wildlife Refuge, a protected area in the Nisqually River estuary
- Fort Nisqually, the first European trading post on Puget Sound
- Lake Nisqually was a proglacial lake in Washington state.
- Nisqually Mission, a Methodist station
- Nisqually River, located between Thurston and Pierce counties

== Other ==
- Nisqually Glacier on Mount Rainier
- Lake Nisqually was a prehistoric lake in the lower basin of Puget Sound and the Nisqually River.
- MV Nisqually, a Steel Electric-class ferry previously part of the Washington State Ferries system
- Nisqually, the former cargo ship SS Suremico which was converted into a scow and lost in the Battle of Wake Island
- Nisqually earthquake of 2001 in Washington
- Nisqually-1, a specimen of Populus trichocarpa, whose genome was sequenced
- Diocese of Nesqually
