= South Mowich Glacier =

Glacier on Mount Rainier, Washington, United States

- Interactive map of South Mowich Glacier
- Type: Mountain glacier
- Location: Mount Rainier, Pierce County, Washington, USA
- Coordinates: 46°51′21″N 121°48′51″W
- Area: 1.4 square miles (3.6 km^{2}), 1983

The South Mowich Glacier is a glacier located on the western flank of Mount Rainier in Washington. It covers 1.4 square miles (3.6 km^{2}) and contains 4.5 billion ft^{3} (127 million m^{3}) of ice. Starting from the high-altitude cliffs above the Sunset Amphitheater at over 12,000 feet (3,700 m), the glacier flows west down Mount Rainier. The glacier is connected to the large Tahoma Glacier to the south near St. Andrews Rock at 11,000 feet (3,400 m). After leaving the Amphitheater, there is an icefall on the glacier where it plunges down below 10,000 feet (3,000 m). As the glacier descends, it gradually turns and by the time the South Mowich meets the Puyallup Glacier at 8,800 feet (2,700 m), the glacier is flowing northwest. As the glacier nears Jeanette Heights, it passes by several turns and becomes very rocky in comparison to the upper sections of the glacier. The glacier splits into two arms before their termini, with a shorter, northern arm ending at 5,500 feet (1,700 m) and the longer, larger southern arm ending near a stand of conifers at 5,100 ft (1,600 m). Meltwater from the glacier drains into the South Mowich River which eventually merges with the Puyallup River.

== See also ==
- North Mowich Glacier
- List of glaciers
