= Lake Tacoma =

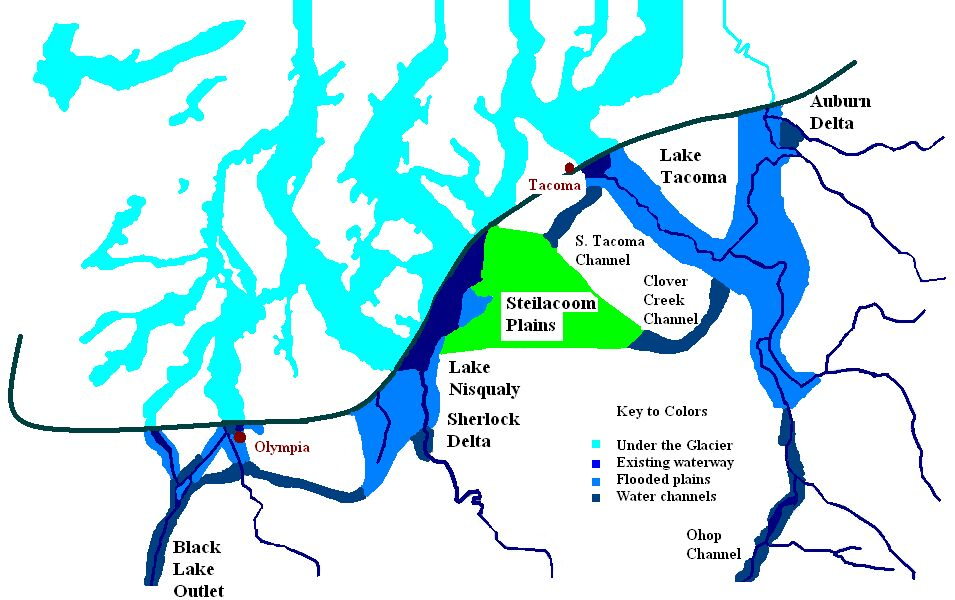
- Glacial lakes Lake Tacoma, Lake Nisqually, & Lake Russell

- Location within Washington (state)
- Location: Puyallup River; Pierce County, Washington
- Coordinates: 47.283283°N 122.449330°W
- Lake type: Glacial lake (former)
- Primary inflows: Vashon Glacier
- Primary outflows: Ohop channel
- Basin countries: United States
- Max. length: 25 miles (40 km)
- Max. width: 18 miles (29 km)
- Max. depth: 256 feet (78 m)
- Residence time: ca 200 years
- Surface elevation: 350 m (1,150 ft)

Lake Tacoma is the name given the freshwater lake in the basin of the Puyallup River and the Green River (Duwamish River) at the point in time that the Vashon Glacier had receded northward into Commencement Bay. Prior to this, it was referred to as the Lake Puyallup. The bluff on which this city is built is used as the landmark where Lake Puyallup ceased and it became Lake Tacoma.

== See also ==
- Glacial Lake Russell
