= Lake Nisqually =

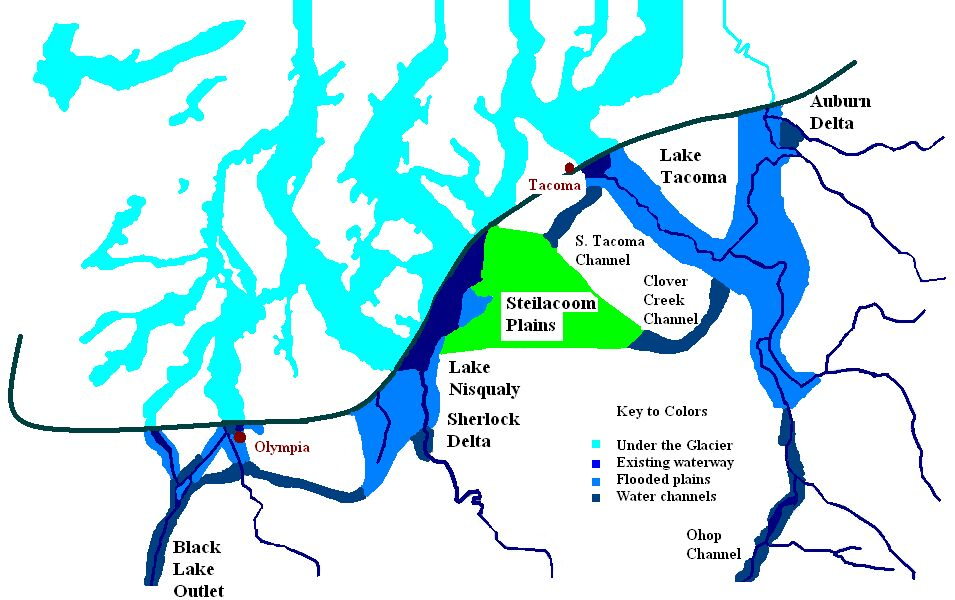
- Glacial lakes Lake Tacoma, Lake Nisqually, and Lake Russell

- Location within Washington (state)
- Location: Tacoma; Pierce County, Washington
- Coordinates: 47.217332°N 122.581240°W
- Lake type: Glacial lake (former)
- Primary inflows: Lake Tacoma
- Primary outflows: Black Lake
- Basin countries: United States
- Surface elevation: 288 m (945 ft)
- References: Washington Geological Survey, Bulletin No. 8; Glaciation of the Puget Sound Region; J. Harlen Bretz; Olympia, Wash, Frank M. Lamborn Public Printer; 1913

Lake Nisqually is used to identify the freshwater lake formed in the Puget Sound trough, west of Tacoma. It is sometime confused with Early Lake Russell which covered the same area during a previous northward retreat of the glacier. The glacier returned southward, then on its final retreat northward, the waters filing this basin are referred to as Lake Nisqually. Its discharge was across the Black Lake channel at 160 feet (49 m) above sea level. Two deltas formed along the eastern margin of the lake from the outflow of Lake Tacoma in the Puyallup River valley. Both the Steilacoom and Sequalichew deltas, at 160 feet (49 m). A rise in level to 180 to 200 feet (55 to 61 m) reflects the closure of the Black Lake outlet while the two deltas were still growing.

The advance of the glacier sufficient to close the Black Lake outlet would turn the Nisqually River, and the drainage of the Steilacoom Plains across Chambers and Bush prairies. During this advance the ice front would have been at a northeast–southwest course between Tacoma and Olympia. The areas of Lake Puyallup and Lake Tacoma were not significantly affected. The Clover Creek and South Tacoma channels remained in use, and the gravel plains adjusted grades to the 180 feet (55 m) level. It appears that clearing of the Narrows occurred during this retreat, and that Lake Tacoma was thus lowered, and became a part of Lake Russell.

== See also ==
- Nisqually River
- Frazer Glaciation
- Vashon Glaciation
