= Mowich River =

Mowich River South Mowich River
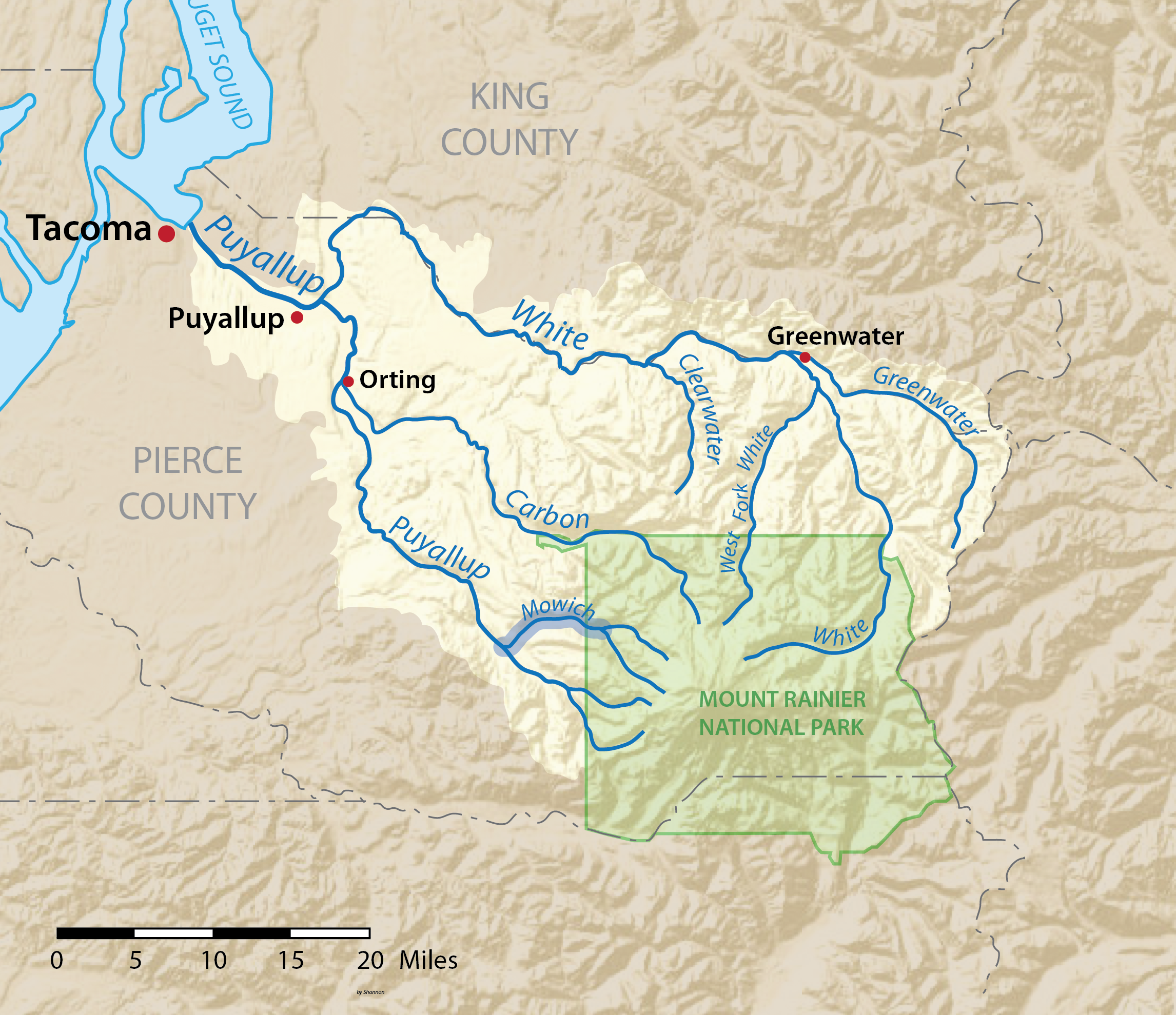
- The Mowich River is shown highlighted on a map of the Puyallup River watershed

Location
- Country: United States
- State: Washington
- County: Pierce

Physical characteristics
- Source: Mount Rainier
  - location: South Mowich Glacier
  - coordinates: 46°52′19″N 121°49′34″W
  - elevation: 7,000 ft (2,100 m)
- Mouth: Puyallup River
  - coordinates: 46°54′2″N 122°1′49″W
  - elevation: 1,680 ft (510 m)
- Length: 30 mi (48 km)

Basin features
- Tributaries
  - left: Rushingwater Creek
  - right: North Mowich River

The Mowich River is a river in the U.S. state of Washington. Its watershed drains a portion of the western side of Mount Rainier, part of the Cascade Range. The river has two main headwater branches, the South Mowich River and the North Mowich River. The South Mowich is significantly larger and sometimes considered the main river. The Mowich and its tributaries drain several of Mount Rainier's glaciers. The upper portion of its watershed is contained within Mount Rainier National Park. The river flows into the Puyallup River in the foothills west of Mount Rainier.

The name "Mowich" come from the Chinook Jargon word for "deer". Originally used for Mowich Lake, the name was later applied to the river and the glacier.

== Sources ==
Meltwater from Mount Rainier's Edmunds Glacier, South Mowich Glacier, and North Mowich Glacier feed the north and south branches of the Mowich River. Other rivers originate in glaciers just south and north of the Mowich River's glaciers. To the south, the Puyallup Glacier gives rise to the Puyallup River, while to the north the Carbon Glacier creates the Carbon River.

== South Mowich River ==
The South Mowich River's headwater tributaries flow around a highland called Jeanette Heights. The river, having been formed by meltwater from the South Mowich and Edmunds Glacier, flows northwest for several miles. Several (all unnamed) glacier-fed streams gather into the South Mowich River on its way to its confluence with the North Mowich. The two join just inside the western boundary of Mount Rainier National Park.

Another highland, the plateau-like Sunset Park lies just southwest of the South Mowich River. The Wonderland Trail passes through Sunset Park and descends into the valley of the South Mowich River, crossing it just above the confluence of the south and north branches. The Wonderland Trail then crosses the North Mowich River and climbs to Mowich Lake and another highland area called Spray Park.

== North Mowich River ==
The North Mowich River's headwater tributaries drain North Mowich Glacier near an area of Mount Rainier called Division Rook. Shortly below the toe of the glacier, the river drops over a large wall, forming Moraine Falls, the first of two waterfalls on the river, both of which are very difficult to access and would take several days to reach on foot. Giant Falls, just as difficult to reach, is located a ways downstream of Moraine Falls. Ptarmigan Ridge separates the North Mowich River's headwaters from Spray Park, much of which is drained by other tributaries of the North Mowich River. Spray Creek rises in Spray Park, tumbles over Spray Falls, and collects a tributary called Grant Creek. Spray Creek then flows down from Spray Park and along the bottom of the steep slope called Eagle Cliff, after which it joins the river.

Shortly below the Spray Creek confluence, the North Mowich River is joined by Crater Creek, which flows from Mowich Lake a few miles to the north. Various tributary creeks, many of which drain Spray Park, flow into Crater Creek. The North and South Mowich Rivers then join just downstream.

== Mowich River Proper ==
After the North Mowich and South Mowich join to form the Mowich River Proper which flows west. It passes Paul Peak to the north, then exits Mount Rainier National Park. Just outside the park the river is joined by Meadow Creek. Then the Mowich River flows by Martin Peak to the north before curving southwest and flowing through a broad, glacier-carved valley. Rushingwater Creek joins the Mowich River just before the Mowich River itself joins the Puyallup River.

== Tributaries ==
South Mowich River

No major tributaries

North Mowich River

- Spray Creek
- Crater Creek

Mowich River Proper

- Meadow Creek
- Rushingwater Creek

== Geology ==
Formed by glacial meltwater, the Mowich River contains a heavy load of sediment such as silt and gravel. After descending from the upper slopes of Mount Rainier the Mowich River flows through a broad glacier-carved valley where thick sediment deposits in the stream bed create sand and gravel bars causing the river to become complexly braided and meandering.

As with other rivers sourced high on Mount Rainier, the Mowich River valley, as well as the Puyallup into which the Mowich flows, are at risk of lahars.

== See also ==
- List of Washington rivers
- List of Chinook Jargon placenames
