= North Mowich Glacier =

Glacier in Washington, United States

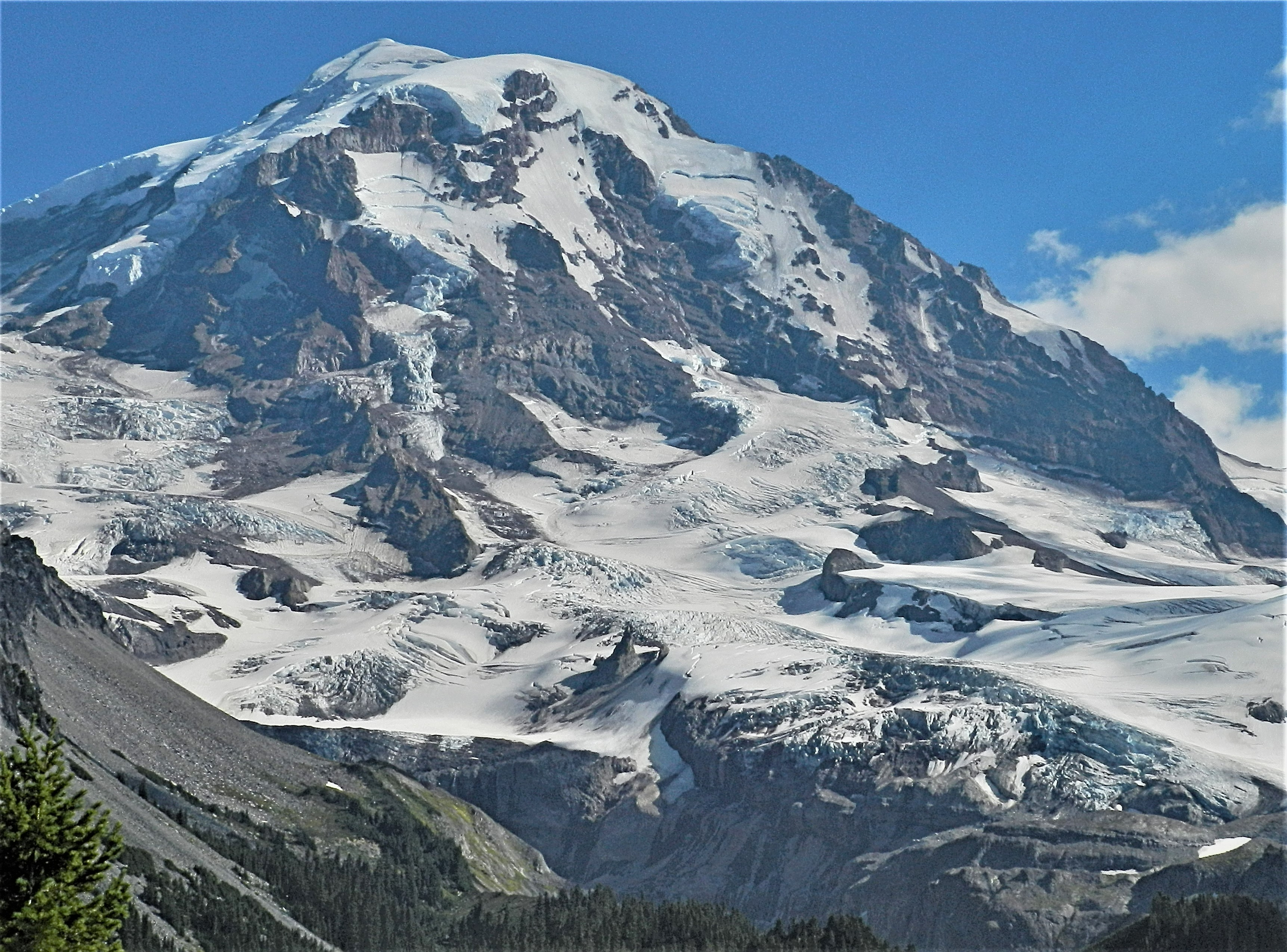
- North Mowich Glacier, northwest slope of Mount Rainier
- Interactive map of North Mowich Glacier
- Type: Mountain glacier
- Location: Mount Rainier, Pierce County, Washington, USA
- Coordinates: 46°52′55″N 121°48′31″W
- Area: 2.4 square miles (6.2 km^{2}), 1983

The North Mowich Glacier is a glacier located on the northwest flank of Mount Rainier in Washington. It covers 2.4 square miles (6.2 km^{2}) and contains 9.5 billion ft^{3} (269 million m^{3}) of ice. Starting from the foot of Rainier's steep Mowich Face at about 9,600 feet (2,900 m), the glacier first consists of two lobes of ice that flow downhill to the northwest. The southern arm of the glacier is connected to the adjacent Edmunds Glacier. As the two sections of ice join up, they form a large, relatively flat plateau of ice ranging from 7,800 feet (2,400 m) to 8,300 feet (2,500 m). This plateau is an unbroken expanse of ice except for Needle Rock, which pokes out of the glacier ice. From then on, the southern part of the glacier terminates at about 6,400 feet (2,000 m), while the northern, rocky arm flows down a glacial valley and ends at about 5,800 ft (1,800 m) in elevation. The North Mowich Glacier gives a rise to the North Mowich River.

== See also ==
- South Mowich Glacier
- List of glaciers
