= Edmunds Glacier =

Glacier of Mount Rainier in the United States of America

- Location within Washington (state)
- Type: Mountain glacier
- Location: Mount Rainier, Pierce County, Washington, USA
- Coordinates: 46°52′04″N 121°48′46″W
- Length: 1.20 mi (1.93 km)
- Terminus: Icefall
- Status: Retreating

Edmunds Glacier is located on Mount Rainier in the U.S. state of Washington. Named in 1883 for Vermont senator George F. Edmunds, the glacier lies on the western flank of the volcano below the steep, rocky Mowich Face and Sunset Face. Starting from an elevation of about 9,900 ft (3,000 m), the glacier flows northwest down to 7,000 ft (2,100 m) and ends northeast of the Jeanette Heights region of Mount Rainier. Meltwater from the Edmunds Glacier feeds the Mowich River which eventually merges with the Puyallup River.

== See also ==
- List of glaciers in the United States
