= Electron, Washington =

- Unincorporated community
- Location within Washington (state)
- Coordinates: 46°59′33″N 122°11′39″W
- Country: United States
- State: Washington
- County: Pierce
- Elevation: 584 ft (178 m)
- Time zone: UTC-8 (Pacific (PST))
  - Summer (DST): UTC-7 (PDT)
- ZIP code: 98360
- Area code: 253

Electron is an unincorporated community in Pierce County in the state of Washington, US.

Electron sits along the Puyallup River just northeast of Lake Kapowsin and is the site of the Electron Hydroelectric Project, a power plant operated by Puget Power. The town was named after the plant. Above the plant, 10.1 miles upriver, is the Electron Diversionary Dam, which runs water to the power plant via a wooden flume. The dam and power plant project was constructed in 1903-04 and began operation on April 12, 1904. Electron was the site of a CCC camp in the 1930s. In 1936, the powerhouse was destroyed by a mudslide; rebuilding was partially completed in 1937 and fully completed in 1941. There is a small town park in Electron.
