= Ohop Lake =

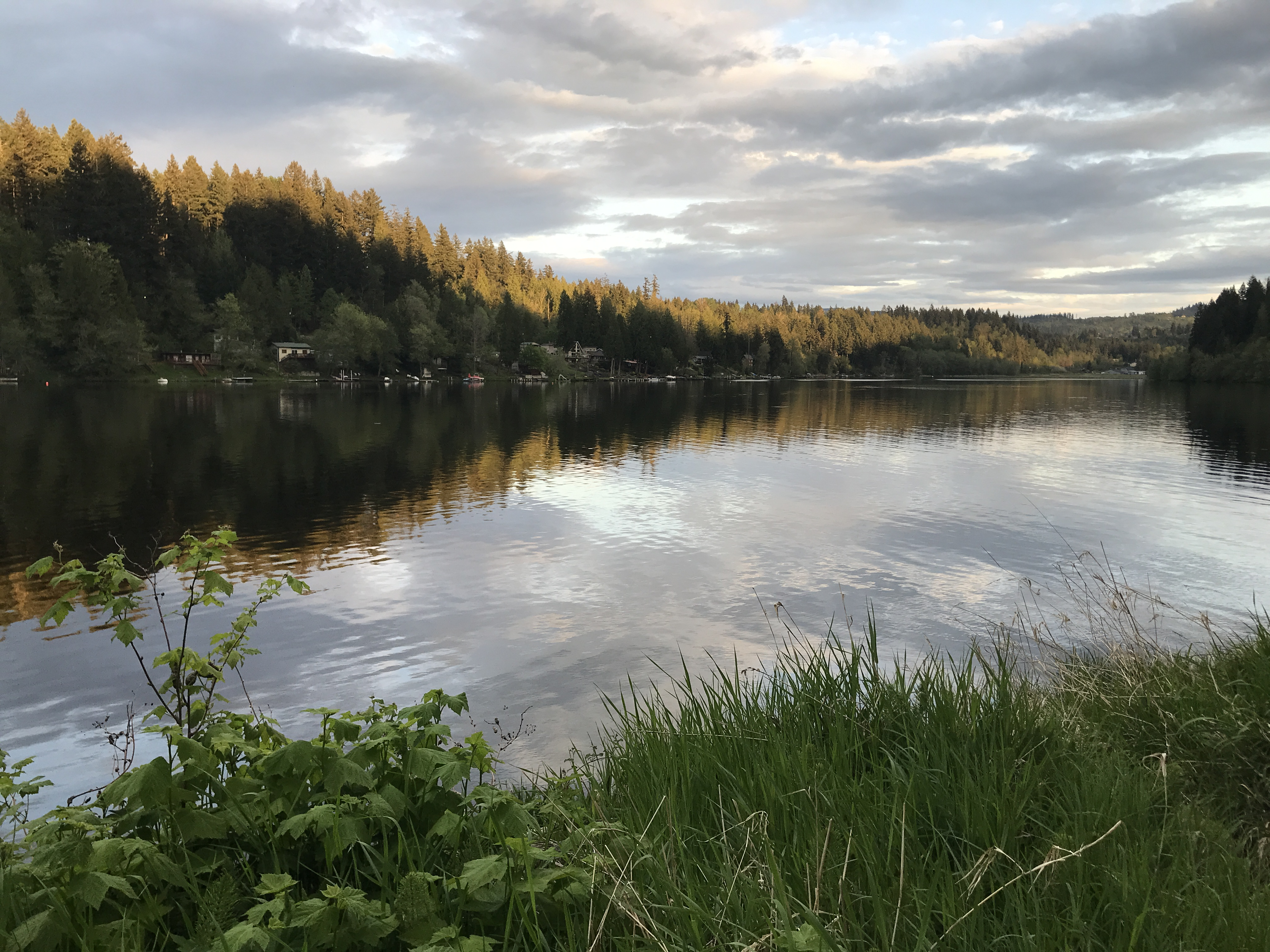

- Location within Washington (state) Location within the United States
- Location: Pierce County, Washington
- Coordinates: 46.8851°N 122.27911°W
- Type: Natural lake
- Primary inflows: Ohop Creek
- Primary outflows: Ohop Creek
- Basin countries: United States
- Surface elevation: 527 ft (161 m)

Ohop Lake is a long and narrow lake near Eatonville, Washington, in Pierce County. It covers 218.2 acres and is situated in the Ohop Valley. It can be accessed through the state public boat launch located on the southern end.

The lake is generally warm and slightly murky, making it popular for water sports. Ohop Lake is also popular for fishing.
