= Glacial Lake Russell =

Lake Russell
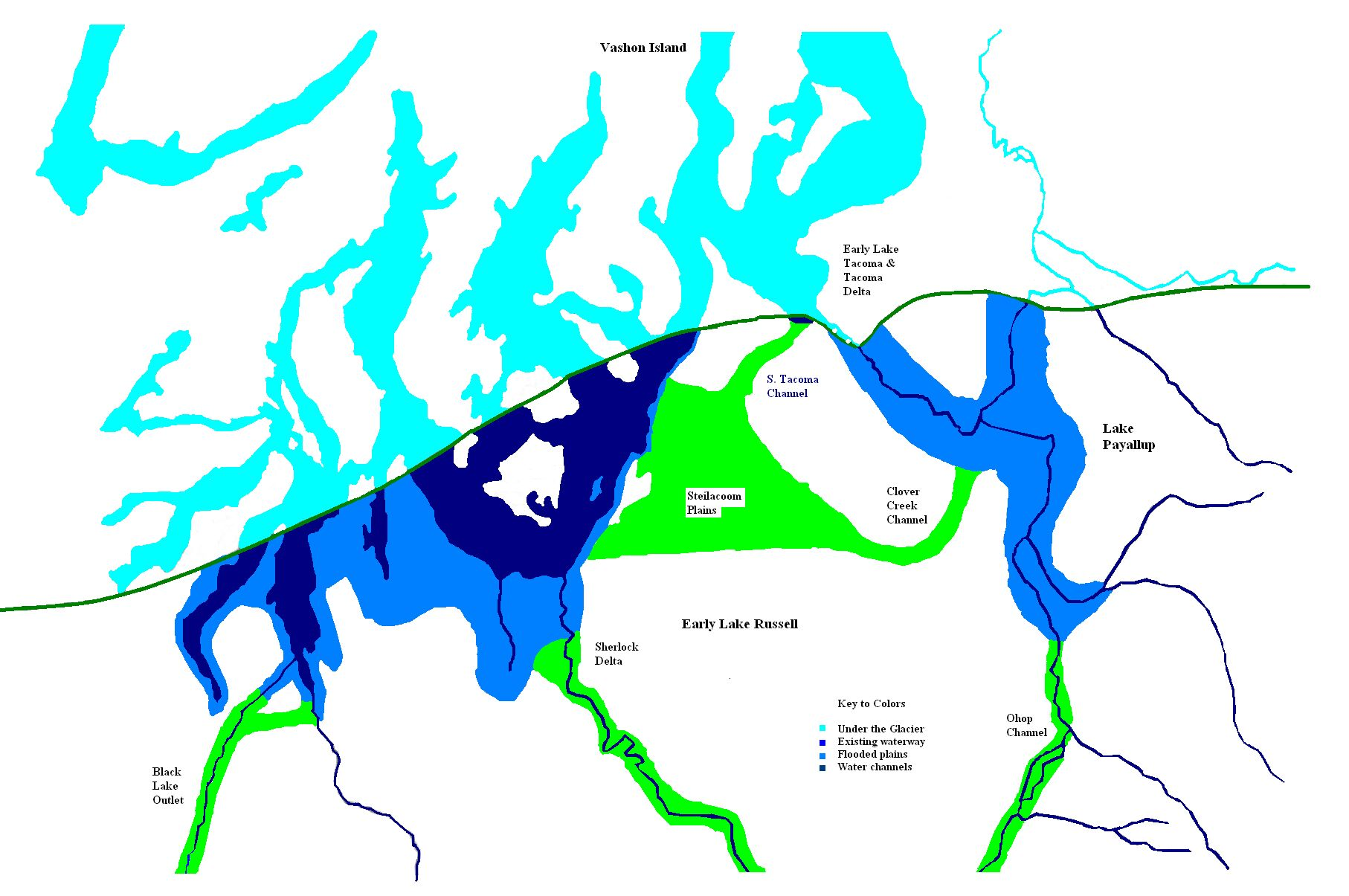
- Glacial lakes Lake Puyallup & Early Lake Russell

- Location within Washington (state)
- Location: Puget Sound; Thurston County, Washington
- Coordinates: 47.117178°N 122.796780°W
- Lake type: Glacial lake (former)
- Primary inflows: Vashon Lobe of the continental glacier
- Primary outflows: Black Lake Outlet
- Basin countries: United States
- Max. length: 65 miles (105 km)
- Max. width: 54 miles (87 km)
- Max. depth: 155 m (509 ft)
- Residence time: ca 600 years
- Surface elevation: 160 m (520 ft)
- References: Washington Geological Survey, Bulletin No. 8; Glaciation of the Puget Sound Region; J. Harlen Bretz; Olympia, Wash, Frank M. Lamborn Public Printer; 1913

During the Vashon Glaciation a series of lakes formed along the southern margin of the Cordilleran Ice Cap. In the Puget Sound depression, a series of lakes developed, of which Lake Russell was the largest and the longest lasting. Early Lake Russell’s surface was at 160 ft (49 m) above sea level, draining across the divide at Shelton, Washington into early Glacial Lake Russell. When the ice margin receded northward, the lake expanded. When it reached the Clifton channel outlet, the water levels dropped to 120 ft (37 m) above sea level. The new longer and lower level lake is referred to as Lake Hood. The glacier continued to retreat until the northern outlet of the Hood Canal was reached as the water level equalized with Glacial Lake Russell becoming part of that body of water.

Lake Russell is named for geologist, Israel Cook Russell.

Forming about 17,000 years before present (ybp) as the ice front began to retreat northward. One version or another of Lake Russell existed from 16,900 ybp until 15,900 ybp.

== Early Lake Russell ==
Early Lake Russell formed in the southern basins of Puget Sound. As the glacial ice retreated northward, the geologic troughs, which create the basins of the sound remained blocked from the northward outlets, until the Tacoma Narrows cleared, the basins east of Tacoma remained separate from those to the west. Lake Tacoma is the name given to these eastern waters, until they merged with those of Lake Russell to the west. Lake Nisqually was the name given to the freshwater in the Nisqually Reach, until the ice front retreated far enough north for the meltwaters to cover the land between the mouth of the Nisqually River and Olympia, joining a freshwater lake in the Budd Inlet and Black Lake forming Early Lake Russell. Lake Russell filled the basins of the Eld Inlet, Budd Inlet, Henderson Inlet, and the great curve of the Nisqually Reach, northward to the Tacoma Narrows, and the highgrounds between then up to 160 feet (49 m) above sea level.

=== Black Lake Outlet ===
When the glacial ice receded northward, reaching the Olympia area, a low drainage was reached in the eastern Black Hills. Using the Black River as its primary drainage, Lake Russell came into existence was continued after the edge of the ice had withdrawn from the region. Using two channels, the waters drained south to the Chehalis River valley. A northern channel left the Budd Inlet in near Butler Cove. A southern channel passed through Capitol Lake. A third channel may have existed from the Eld Inlet. They merged where Black Lake now exists, following the Black River southward. Following the south side of a line of hill, the channel is 150 to 155 feet (46 to 47 m) above sea level with a gravel plain 160 feet (49 m) across the outlet. This barrier is thought to be deposits from the outflow. Percival Creek contains the Northern Pacific Railroad route over the pass between Puget Sound and the Chehalis Valley. In the pass is a long, narrow swamp, which drains to both Puget Sound and Grays Harbor. Its altitude is 120 feet (37 m) above sea level. Along the southern margin is a gravel bluff at 150 to 160 feet (46 to 49 m) of considerable size. The northern margin has a gravel terrace at 140 feet (43 m) above sea level, and another narrow terrace is at 160 feet (49 m). The existing valley is the result of post-glacial erosion. The bluffs along both sides are seen as evidence of this theory. Black Lake resides in the pass, beginning as a swamp. Black Lake is 2 to 2.5 miles (3.2 to 4.0 km) long and 0.5 miles (0.80 km) wide. It stands 120 feet (37 m) above tide. Withdrawal of the edge of the ice from Thurston County left both the Deschutes and Nisqually Rivers free to flow directly northward to the growing body of water in the unobliterated interglacial valleys. The Nisqually carried a large volume of water when it first entered Lake Russell, since the Ohop channel still contributed the drainage of the northern and western slopes of Mount Rainier. It appears to have entered the western side of the interglacial Gate Pathway River valley, and to have contributed considerably toward the obliteration of that valley by deposition of the Sherlock Delta.
