= Electron Hydroelectric Project =

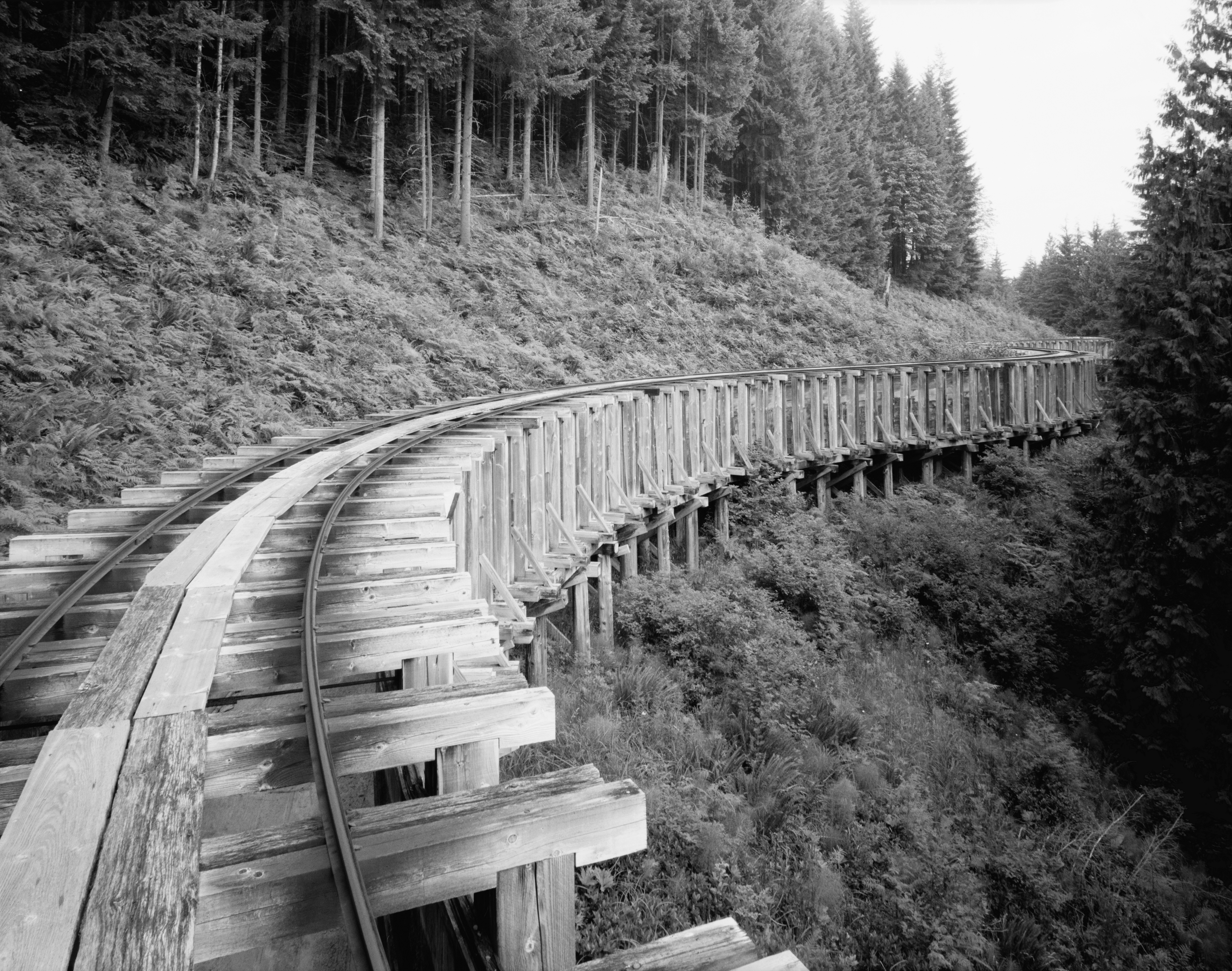
Flume with Railway line on side hill

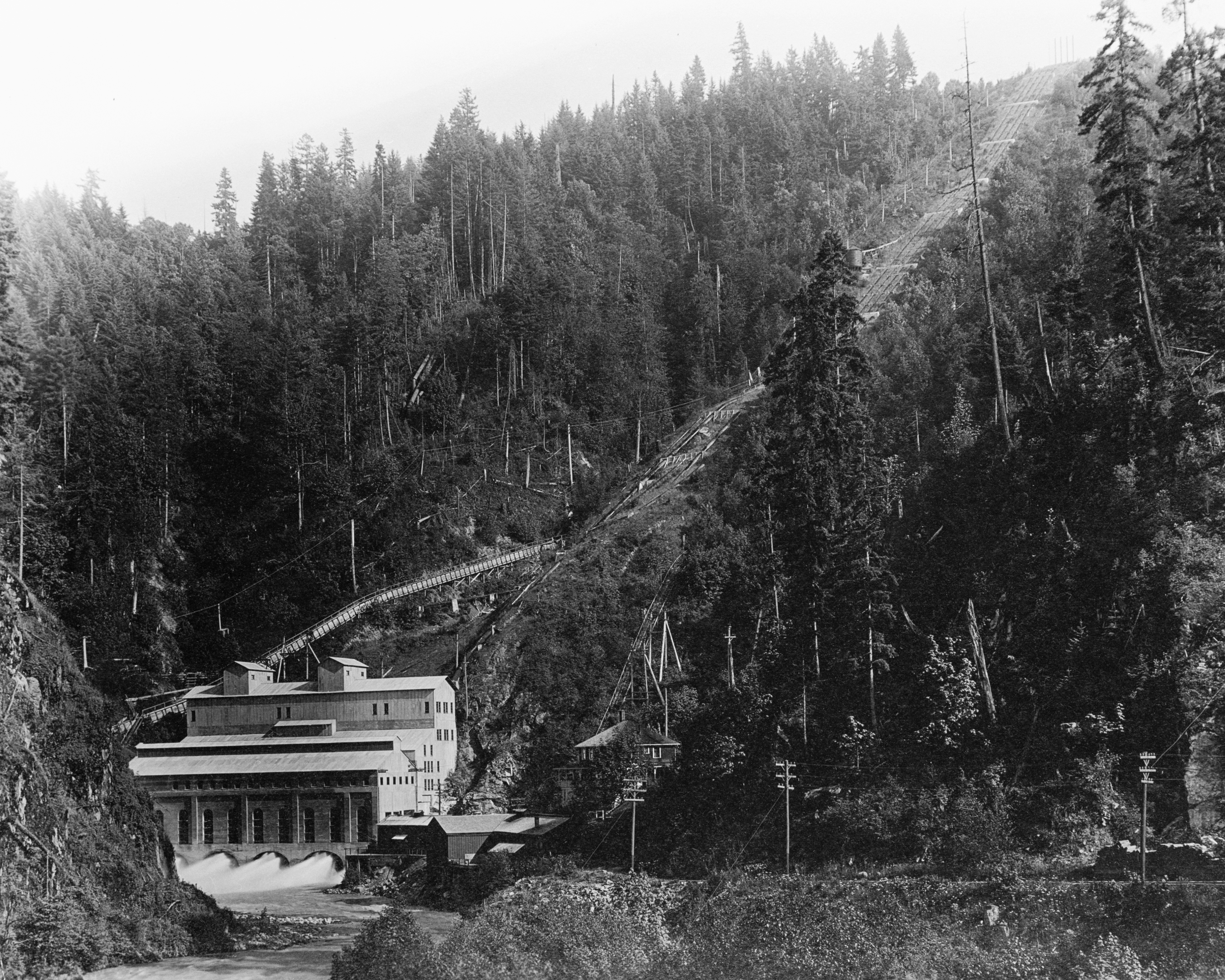
Powerhouse in 1904

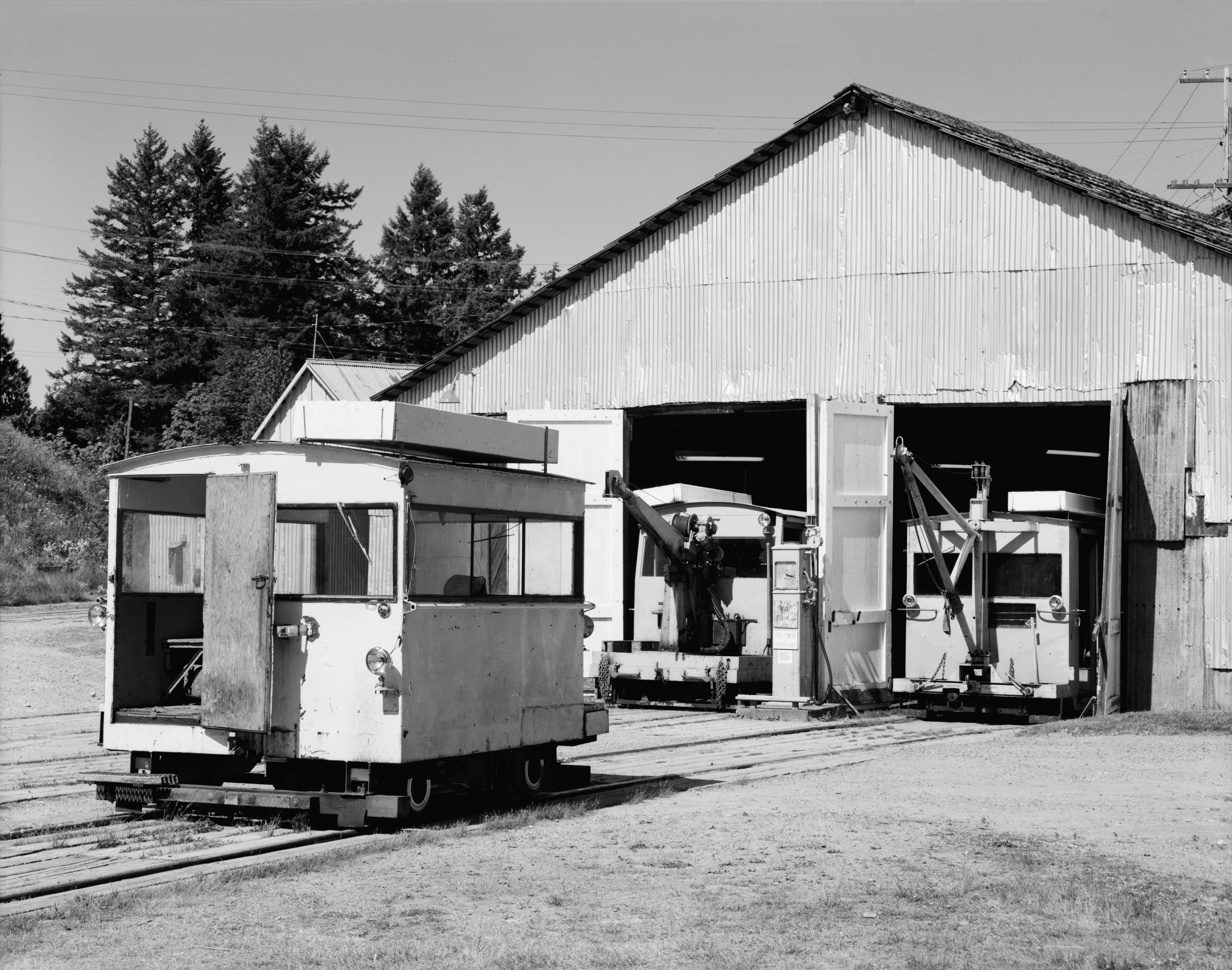
Passenger speeder 04 in the foreground, and in the shed Boom Speeder 75 left of Boom Speeder 59

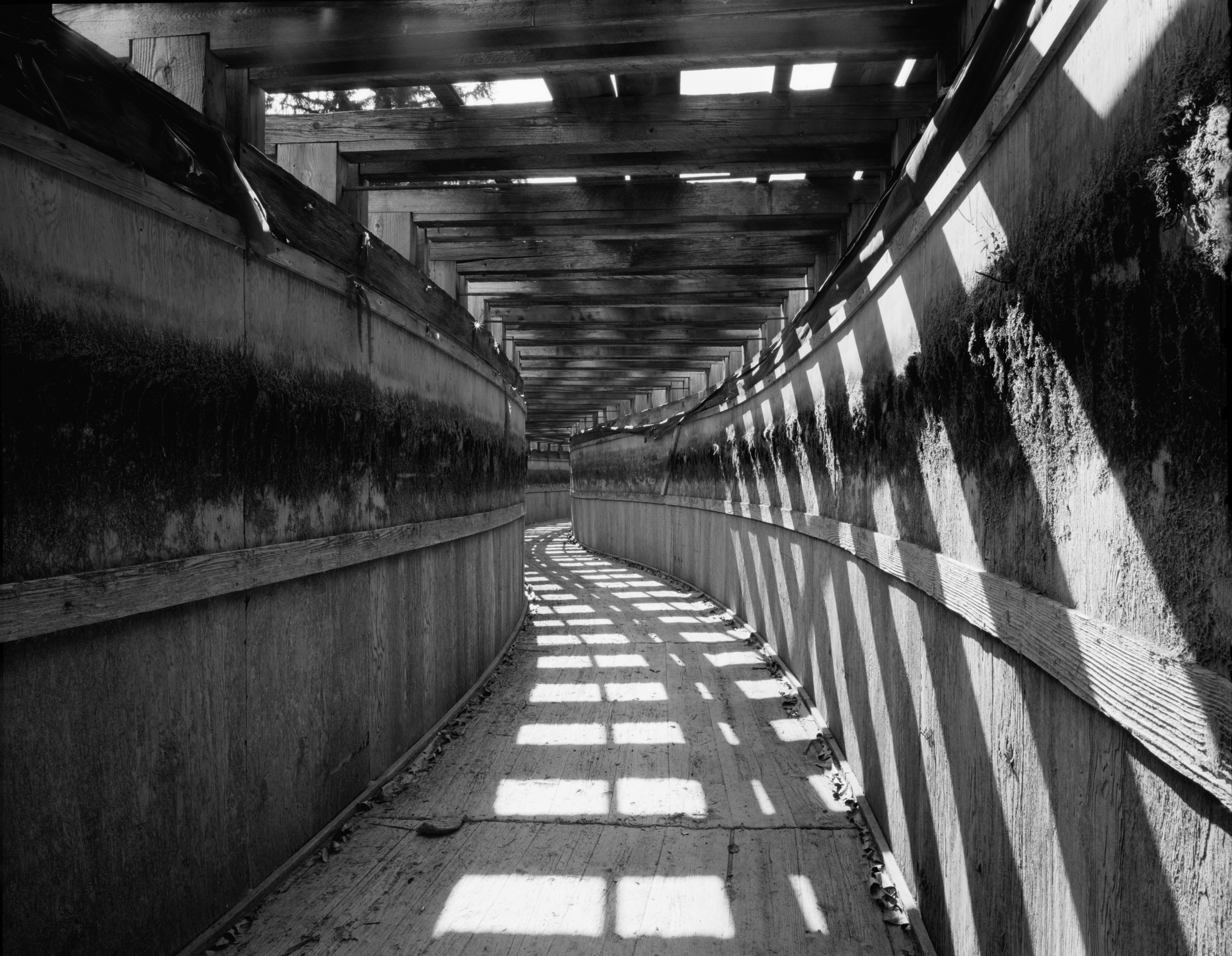
Flume with plywood walls, looking upstream

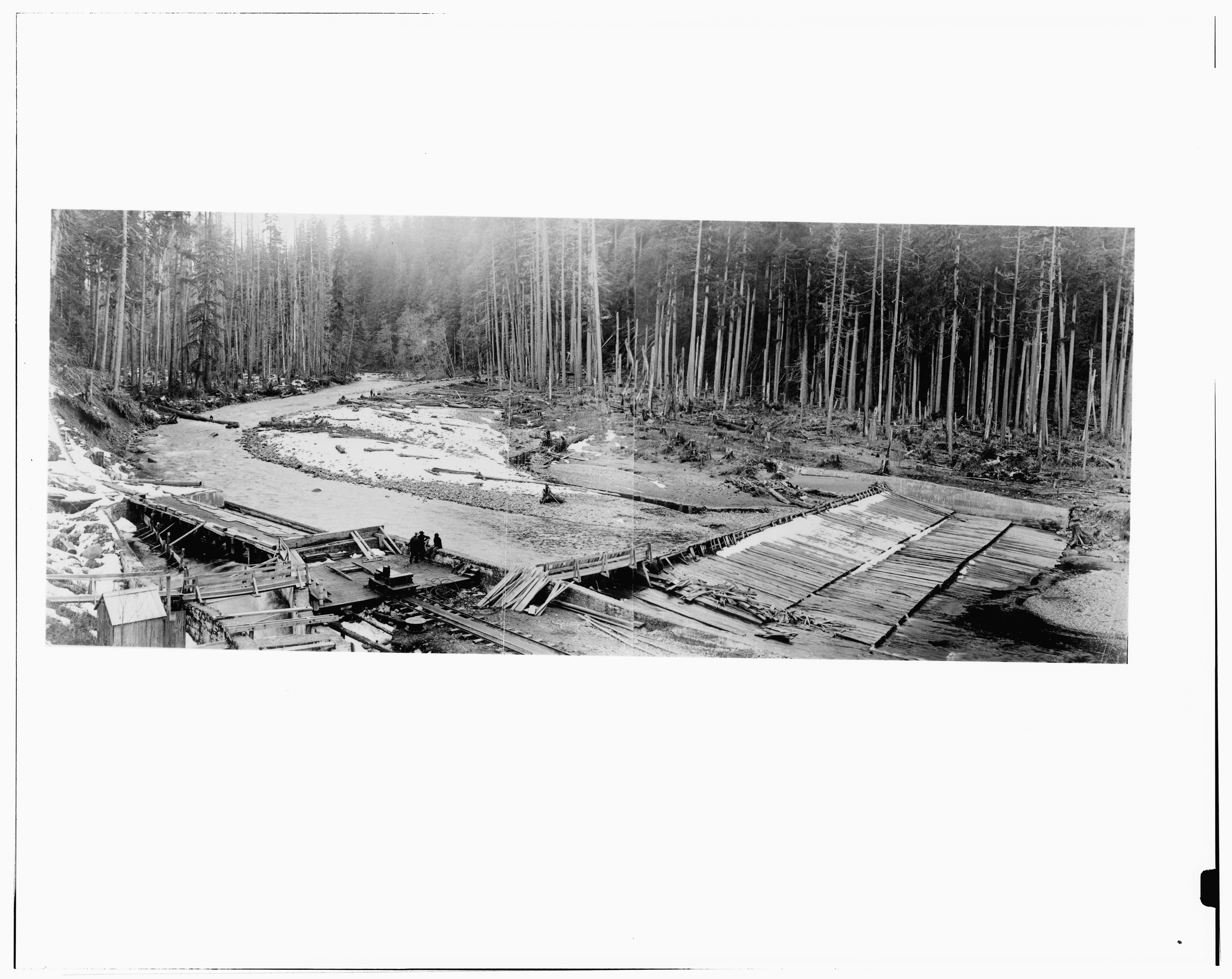
Electron Diversion Dam, 1904

The Electron Hydroelectric Project, originally known as the Puyallup Project, is a hydroelectric power plant operated by Electron Hydro LLC on the Puyallup River in Pierce County, Washington. It generates 26.2 megawatts (35,100 hp) of electricity and is operated and maintained by approximately 20 full-time employees.

== Location ==
It is located along the Puyallup River near Kapowsin, Pierce County, approximately 25 miles (40 km) southeast of Tacoma and 42 miles (68 km) southeast of Seattle in the western foothills of Mount Rainier.

== Technology ==
The project, which was completed in 1904, draws water from the Puyallup River behind the Electron Diversion Dam, then funnels it to the Electron power plant via a 10-mile (16 km) span of wooden flume running along the side hills of the winding river valley while the river runs down a steep canyon. The wooden flume has a cross section of 8 by 8 feet (2.4 by 2.4 m) and can supply up to 400 cubic feet (11 m^{3}) of water per second to the turbines of the Electron powerhouse. Original construction took approximately 14 months to complete. The grade is uniform and runs at seven feet of elevation per mile.

A light railway line was built on top of the flume to shuttle maintenance workers and equipment. It is known as "the crookedest railway in the world," but it is not the only railway line with this claim.

The flume and the railway were rebuilt in the 1940s, then again in 1985 on the original track. The original wood frames were replaced with over 12,000 steel frames, roughly four feet (1.2 m) on center. The flume is supported with over 6,000 bents. The flume is lined with 5.5 million board feet of fir. Electron Hydro, LLC is in the process of rebuilding the wood liner with Alaska yellow cedar and possibly coated with Polyurea. It is notable for likely being the largest flume in use for hydroelectric projects in the United States.

== Fish passage facilities ==
The upstream migration of spawning adult salmon and rainbow trout is possible by a concrete, 300-foot (91 m) fish ladder built alongside the wooden diversion dam opposite the flume intake. Migrating juvenile fish that inadvertently enter the wooden flume downstream will be captured alive and placed back in the Puyallup River using a trap-and-haul facility, which is located in the storage reservoir’s forebay.

== Incidents ==
On July 29, 2020, Electron Hydro, the company that owns and operates the dam, experienced an industrial accident in which crumb rubber debris was released into the Puyallup River. Astro-turf used as part of a cofferdam broke loose from the HDPE liner and was spilled into the river. The company took immediate action to rectify the spill.

In early May 2023, a Pierce County Superior Court Judge had approved a $1 million settlement in a criminal lawsuit brought by the state Attorney General’s Office over a 2020 spill of rubber into the Puyallup River during a construction project at the old wooden dam. The financial penalties for Electron Hydro were approved over the discharge of rubber that was torn loose from artificial turf the company used during a construction project. Chunks of the turf padding, made of ground-up tire rubber that is toxic to fish when ingested, were found as far as 21 miles (34 km) downriver after it was used without a permit to line a water-diversion channel. Electron Hydro Chief Operating Officer Thom Fischer pleaded guilty to a gross criminal misdemeanor and received a suspended jail sentence. The $1 million settlement included $745,000 in restitution to the Puyallup Tribal Fisheries and $255,000 in fines paid to Pierce County. In addition to the settlement with the Attorney General’s Office, Electron Hydro in 2021 was fined $501,000 by the state Department of Ecology for polluting the river.

The company also installed a rock wall in 2020 which was supposed to be removed in 2021. Electron Hydro was ordered by the court in February 2024 to remove the center portion of the rock dam during the summer. The court ruled that the barrier harmed steelhead trout, Chinook salmon, and bull trout, which are protected under the Endangered Species Act.
