= McMillin, Washington =

- CDP
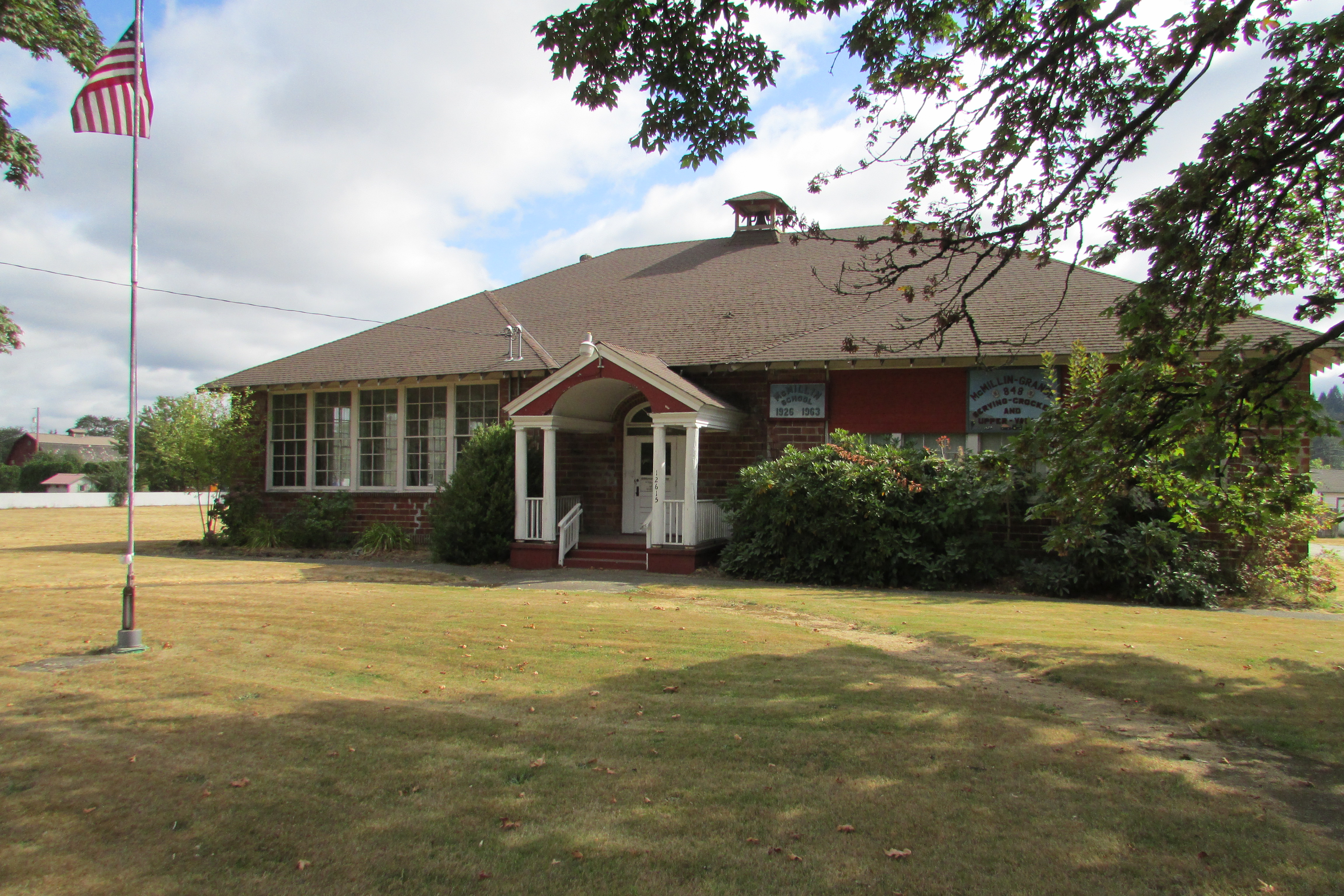
- McMillin School, McMillin community in Pierce County.

- Location within Washington (state)
- Coordinates: 47°07′25″N 122°14′13″W
- Country: United States
- State: Washington
- County: Pierce

Area
  - Total: 1.65 sq mi (4.3 km^{2})
  - Land: 1.59 sq mi (4.1 km^{2})
  - Water: 0.06 sq mi (0.16 km^{2})
- Elevation: 128 ft (39 m)

Population (2020)
  - Total: 1,624
  - Density: 1,020/sq mi (394/km^{2})
- Time zone: Pacific
- GNIS feature ID: 2585002

McMillin is a census-designated place located in Pierce County, Washington. As of the 2020 census, McMillin had a population of 1,624.

== Demographics ==
Historical population
Census	Pop.	Note	%±
2010	1,547		—
2020	1,624		5.0%
U.S. Decennial Census; 2000 2010

McMillin first appeared as a census designated place in the 2010 U.S. census formed from part of South Hill CDP.

=== Racial and ethnic composition ===
McMillin CDP, Washington – Racial and ethnic composition Note: the US Census treats Hispanic/Latino as an ethnic category. This table excludes Latinos from the racial categories and assigns them to a separate category. Hispanics/Latinos may be of any race.
Race / Ethnicity (NH = Non-Hispanic)	Pop 2010	Pop 2020	% 2010	% 2020
White alone (NH)	1,345	1,336	86.94%	82.27%
Black or African American alone (NH)	11	9	0.71%	0.55%
Native American or Alaska Native alone (NH)	15	10	0.97%	0.62%
Asian alone (NH)	36	38	2.33%	2.34%
Native Hawaiian or Pacific Islander alone (NH)	1	14	0.06%	0.86%
Other race alone (NH)	3	5	0.19%	0.31%
Mixed race or Multiracial (NH)	61	112	3.94%	6.90%
Hispanic or Latino (any race)	75	100	4.85%	6.16%
Total	1,547	1,624	100.00%	100.00%

=== 2020 census ===
As of the 2020 census, McMillin had a population of 1,624. The median age was 49.7 years. 20.0% of residents were under the age of 18 and 24.1% of residents were 65 years of age or older. For every 100 females there were 98.3 males, and for every 100 females age 18 and over there were 96.8 males age 18 and over.

100.0% of residents lived in urban areas, while 0.0% lived in rural areas.

There were 644 households in McMillin, of which 27.3% had children under the age of 18 living in them. Of all households, 65.7% were married-couple households, 10.7% were households with a male householder and no spouse or partner present, and 16.1% were households with a female householder and no spouse or partner present. About 14.4% of all households were made up of individuals and 6.7% had someone living alone who was 65 years of age or older.

There were 650 housing units, of which 0.9% were vacant. The homeowner vacancy rate was 0.0% and the rental vacancy rate was 2.0%.

Racial composition as of the 2020 census
Race	Number	Percent
White	1,355	83.4%
Black or African American	10	0.6%
American Indian and Alaska Native	16	1.0%
Asian	39	2.4%
Native Hawaiian and Other Pacific Islander	14	0.9%
Some other race	38	2.3%

=== 2010 census ===
In 2010, it had a population of 1,547 inhabitants. 685 are male. 862 are female.
