= Tahoma Glacier =

Glacier in the United States

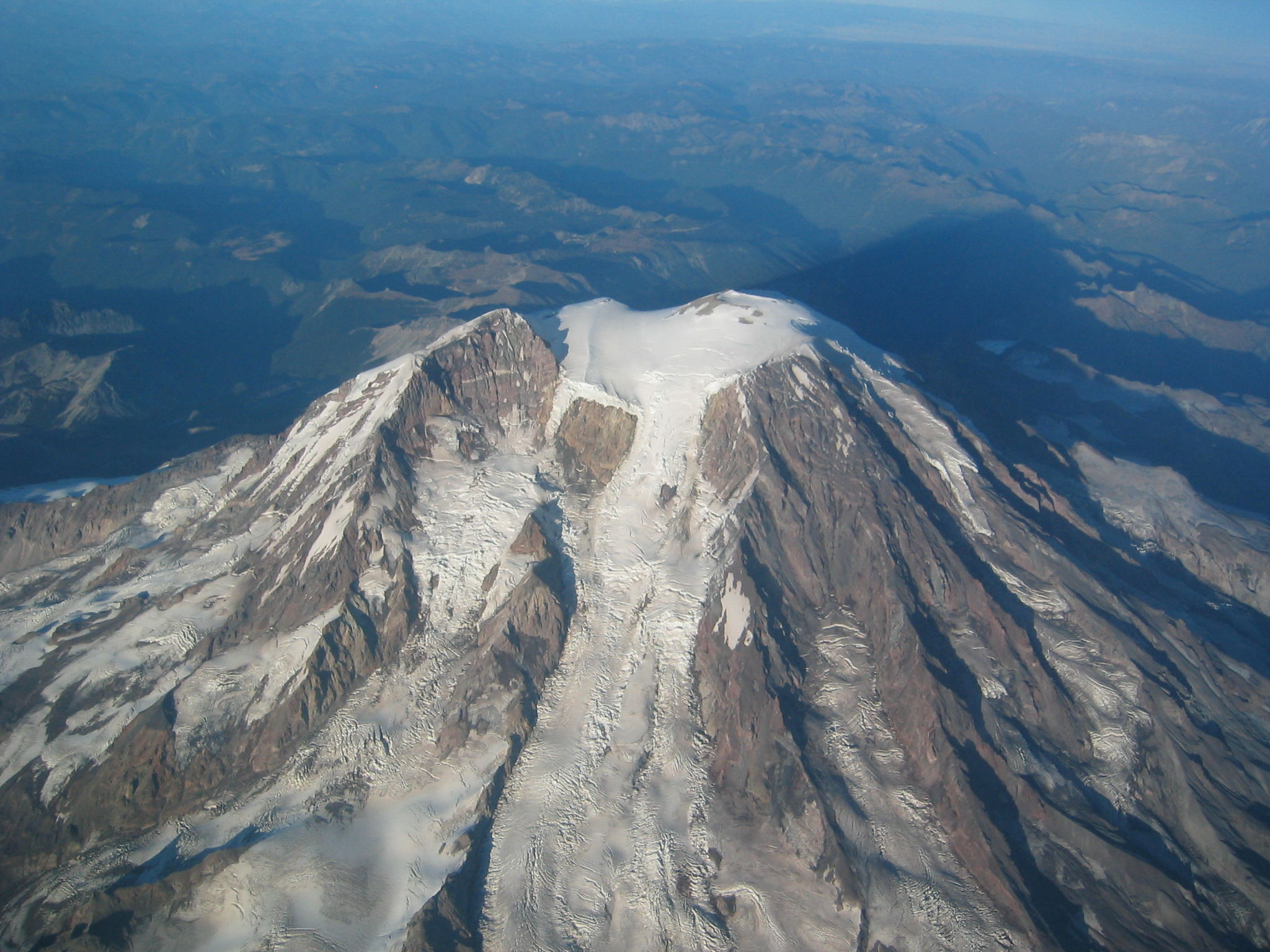
- Tahoma Glacier descends from the summit ice cap between St. Andrews Rock and Puyallup Cleaver (left) and Tahoma Cleaver (right).
- Interactive map of Tahoma Glacier
- Type: Mountain glacier
- Location: Mount Rainier, Pierce County, Washington, USA
- Coordinates: 46°50′23″N 121°48′33″W
- Area: 1.2 square miles (3.1 km^{2}), 1983

The Tahoma Glacier is a long glacier mostly on the western flank of Mount Rainier in Washington. It covers 1.2 square miles (3.1 km^{2}) and contains 4.3 billion cubic feet (120×10^{6} m^{3}) of ice. The glacier starts out near the summit of the volcano at over 14,200 feet (4,300 m). As the glacier flows west-southwest out of the summit area, it cascades down a steep rocky face as an icefall from 13,200 feet (4,000 m) to 11,000 feet (3,400 m), where the glacier is connected to the South Mowich Glacier to the north in the Sunset Amphitheater. As the glacier drops below 10,000 feet (3,000 m), it broadens and joins the smaller South Tahoma Glacier. After the broad expanse of ice at over 8,000 feet (2,400 m), the Tahoma Glacier narrows as it descends around the rocky 7,690-foot (2,344 m) Glacier Island, a sub-peak of Rainier once fully encircled by both the South Tahoma and Tahoma Glaciers. Leaving the bottleneck in the glacier, the glacier splits; the larger, longer northern arm continues flowing west-southwest and terminates at around 5,500 feet (1,700 m). The southern arm flows south towards the arm of the South Tahoma Glacier, but this arm terminates before it rejoins the South Tahoma at 5,700 ft (1,700 m). Meltwater from the glacier is the source of the South Puyallup River and Tahoma Creek, a tributary of the Nisqually River.

== See also ==
- South Tahoma Glacier
- List of glaciers
