= Vashon Glaciation =

North American ice age, 9,000–16,000 BCE

Vashon Glaciation
19,000 – 16,000 BP
An artist's depiction of a landscape adjacent to the ice sheet during the glaciation.
Vashon occurred at...
| Continent: | North America |
| Present-day country: | United States of America |
| Present-day state: | Washington |
| Region: | Western Washington |
| Geologic Formation: | Crescent Terrane (see Siletzia) |
Vashon Glaciation occurred within the...
| Phanerozoic Eon | 541,000,000 BP – Present |
| Cenozoic Era | 66,000,000 BP – Present |
| Quaternary Period | 2,580,000 - Present |
| Pleistocene Epoch | 2,580,000 - 11,700 BP |
| Late Pleistocene | 129,000 – 11,700 BP |
Vashon Glaciation was a part of the...
| Late Cenozoic Ice Age | 33,900,000 BP to present |
| Quaternary glaciation | 2,580,000 BP to present |
| Last glacial period | 110,000 – 12,000 BP |
| Wisconsin glaciation | 85,000 – 11,000 BP |
| Fraser glaciation | 20,000 – 10,000 BP |
| Vashon glaciation | 19,000 – 16,000 BP |

The Vashon Glaciation, Vashon Stadial or Vashon Stade is a local term for the most recent period of very cold climate in which during its peak, glaciers covered the entire Salish Sea as well as present day Seattle, Tacoma, Olympia and other surrounding areas in the western part of present-day Washington (state) of the United States of America. This occurred during a cold period around the world known as the last glacial period. This was the most recent cold period of the Quaternary glaciation, the time period in which the arctic ice sheets have existed. The Quaternary Glaciation is part of the Late Cenozoic Ice Age, which began 33.9 million years ago and is ongoing. It is the time period in which the Antarctic ice cap has existed.

The Vashon Glaciation lasted from about 19,000 – 16,000 BP (Before Present – present defined as January 1, 1950 for this scale). The Cordilleran Ice Sheet was an ice sheet that covered present-day southern Alaska and parts of western Canada. The Fraser Glaciation began when the Cordilleran Ice Sheet advanced out of the mountains of British Columbia following the Fraser River and Fraser Valley. The Vashon Glaciation is an extension of the Fraser Glaciation in which the Cordilleran Ice Sheet advanced south of the present day Canada–United States border into the Puget Sound region. By following the Fraser Valley, the ice reached the Puget Sound Region using the same pathway that cold arctic air takes during a present-day winter cold snap.

The Cordilleran, Laurentide, Innuitian, and the currently existing Greenland Ice Sheet all made up the North American ice sheet complex, which covered present day Canada and much of the northern U.S. This cold glaciated time for North America was called the Wisconsin glaciation.

== Climate (20,000 to 16,000 BP) ==
During the Vashon glaciation, the climate in Western Washington, like most places, was much colder than today. As well as being cold, it was also much drier than in current times, which was characteristic of some places, and opposite of others.

Pollen data collected from Battleground Lake in southwest Washington (state) shows that from 20,000 – 16,000 BP, annual temperatures in the area were about 6 ± 1 °C (10.8 ± 1.8 °F) colder than in present times (present times as of 1990), and precipitation was around 1 meter (39.4 inches) less. The Battle Ground area averaged 52.14 inches (132.44 cm) of precipitation per year for the period of 1961–1990. A meter less precipitation means that during period of 20,000 – 16,000 BP, the average precipitation would have only been around 24.5% of what it was in the near present 1961–1990 period.

The Laurentide Ice Sheet had a major effect on the climate. It was an ice sheet covering much of Canada, and parts of the northern United States in the Midwest and east. The Rocky Mountains separated the Laurentide Ice Sheet from the Cordilleran Ice Sheet. The Laurentide Ice Sheet had a cooling effect on the middle latitudes. This caused the jet stream over North America to split in two. The southern branch was pushed further south than it is in present times meaning that the storm tracks were missing the Pacific Northwest most of the time. Because of this, Southern and Central California had wetter climates than in present times.

Average Annual Temperatures and Precipitation from 20,000 – 16,000 BP
| City/Location | Average Annual Temperature | Average Annual Precipitation |
| Aberdeen | 39.7 °F (4.3 °C) | 20.26 inches (51.46 cm) |
| Battle Ground | 40.2 °F (4.6 °C) | 12.77 inches (32.44 cm) |
| Centralia | 40.8 °F (4.9 °C) | 11.52 inches (29.26 cm) |
| Vancouver | 40.4 °F (4.7 °C) | 10.12 inches (25.69 cm) |
Table is based on temperatures being 6 °C colder and precipitation only being 24.5% of what it was in the 1961–1990 period. Source for 1961–1990 averages: Western Regional Climate Data Center; The locations listed are areas not covered by the glacier. Calculating climate on top of the glacier is more complicated due to the elevation difference and the effect that ice has on temperature.

Average annual temperatures in the lowlands of Western Washington were above 0 °C (32 °F). This means that there was more summer thawing than there was winter freezing. This would seem to be a climate too warm to support glaciers, but the ice was pushing in from the north faster than it could melt.

== The advance (19,000 to 16,950 BP) ==
The advance of the Cordilleran Ice Sheet actually began long before 19,000 years ago. However, 19,000 years ago marks the approximate time when glaciers crossed the present-day Canada–United States border into Western Washington, which is generally considered to be the beginning of the Vashon Glaciation. This southern part of the Cordilleran Ice Sheet is called the Puget Lobe. During the Vashon Glaciation, the Cordilleran Ice Sheet grew and advanced southwards at a rate of about 135 metres (443 ft) per year. The Vashon Glaciation actually began after the planet's Last Glacial Maximum. Glaciers were retreating throughout most of the world, but growing in Western Washington. Around 18,350 BP, the Puget Lobe blocked the Puget Sound from reaching the Strait of Juan de Fuca, turning the Puget Sound into Glacial Lake Russell. By around 17,950 BP, the glacier reached present-day Seattle. By around 17,650 BP, the Puget Lobe reached present-day Tacoma. By around 17,350 BP, the glacier reached present-day Olympia. The Puget Lobe reached its maximum extent in the vicinity of the present-day city of Tenino around 16,950 BP.

== The maximum extent (16,950 to 16,850 BP) ==
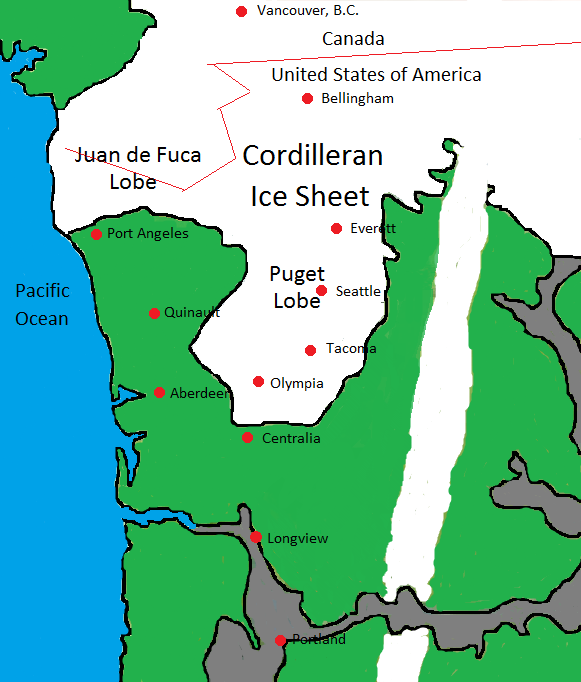
Map showing the Vashon Glaciation at its maximum extent.

The Puget Lobe remained at its maximum extent in the vicinity of present-day Tenino from around 16,950 BP to around 16,850 BP, a total of about 100 years. The ice depths were about 1.6 kilometres (0.99 mi) at the present-day Canada–United States border, 1,000 metres (3,300 ft) in Seattle, and 200 metres (660 ft) at the glacier's terminus in the Tenino area.

== The retreat (16,850 to 16,000 BP) ==
Around 16,850 BP, the Puget Lobe began retreating northward at a rate of about 340 meters (1,120 feet) per year. By about 16,650 BP, the glacier only came down to present-day Olympia. The Puget Lobe began to uncover Glacial Lake Russell. By 16,450 BP, the Puget Lobe only came down to Tacoma. By 16,150 BP, the glacier only came down to Seattle. By about 16,000 BP, the Puget Lobe retreated far enough north that Glacial Lake Russell and the Strait of Juan de Fuca became connected, making Glacial Lake Russell the salt water body of Puget Sound again.

Formation of Kettles and Kettle Lakes

For areas on land, as the Puget Lobe receded, blocks of ice broke off and became separate. The melting glacier produced streams which carried sediment. The bottom of the ice blocks became buried in sediment. As the blocks of ice melted, it left depressions in the ground called kettles. Some of these kettles filled up with water to become kettle lakes and kettle ponds. (see Kettle (landform))

Glacial Lake Carbon – Catastrophic Glacial Outburst Flood

Glacial Lake Carbon was a lake created by the Puget Lobe damming the Carbon River. Around 16,850 BP when the glacier began retreating, the ice dam holding back the lake became breached causing a major glacial outburst flood. The flood covered present day central and northern Thurston County, part of Pierce County, and small parts of Lewis and Grays Harbor Counties.

== Flora and Fauna of the Vashon Glaciation ==
| Common Name/ Species Name | Family | Current Status | Region | Image |
|---|---|---|---|---|
| Ancient Bison Bison antiquus | Bovidae | Extinct | | |
| Muskox; Ovibos moschatus | Bovidae | Extirpated | | |
| Extinct Western Camel, Yesterday's Camel; Camelops hesternus | Camelidae | Extinct | | |
| Dire Wolf; Aenocyon dirus | Canidae | Extinct | | |
| Gray Wolf; Canis lupus | Canidae | Extirpated | | |
| American Scimitar Cat; Homotherium serum | Felidae | Extinct | | |
| American Lion Panthera atrox | Felidae | Extinct | | |
| Saber-toothed Tiger Smilodon fatalis | Felidae | Extinct | | |
| Giant Short-faced Bear; Arctodus simus | Ursidae | Extinct. | | |
| Columbian Mammoth; Mammuthus columbi | Elephantidae | Extinct | | |
| Pacific Mastodon; Mammut pacificus | Mammutidae | Extinct | | |
| Jefferson's Ground Sloth; Megalonyx jeffersonii | Megalonychidae | Extinct | | |
| Mazama Pocket Gopher Thomomys mazama melanops | Geomyidae | Extant | | |
| Supalpine Fir Abies lasiocarpa | Pinaceae | Extirpated | Puget Sound Region, 21,000 – 17,000 BP | |
| Picea | Pinaceae | Extant | Olympic Peninsula – west side lowlands, 20,000 – 16,000 BP | |
| Engelmann Spruce Picea engelmannii | Pinaceae | Extirpated | Puget Sound Region, 21,000 – 17,000 BP | |
| Pine; Pinus | Pinaceae | Extant | Olympic Peninsula – west side lowlands, 20,000 – 16,000 BP | |
| Lodgepole Pine; Pinus contorta | Pinaceae | Extant | Puget Sound Region, 21,000 – 17,000 BP | |
| Western Hemlock; Tsuga heterophylla | Pinaceae | Extant | Olympic Peninsula – west side lowlands, 20,000 – 16,000 BP | |
| Mountain Hemlock; Tsuga mertensiana | Pinaceae | Extant | Olympic Peninsula – west side lowlands, 20,000 – 16,000 BP | |
| Pacific Yew; Taxus brevifolia | Taxaceae | Extant | Puget Sound Region, 21,000 – 17,000 BP | |
| Sagebrush Artemisia | Asteraceae | Extirpated | Puget Sound Region, 21,000 – 17,000 BP; Olympic Peninsula – west side near the alpine glaciers, 20,000 – 16,000 BP | |
| Alder; Alnus | Classical Latin: Betvlaceae; Medieval Latin: Betulaceae | Extant | Olympic Peninsula – west side lowlands, 20,000 – 16,000 BP | |

== Post Vashon times (16,000 BP to present) ==
Pollen data collected from Battleground Lake shows that between 16,000 and 15,000 BP, temperatures were around 4 ± 2 °C (7.2 ± 3.6 °F) colder than present (present as of 1990). The amount of precipitation was similar to that of the present.

From about 14,000 to 12,000 BP, more Pinus contorta (lodgepole pine) began to grow in the region, but was still an open area. Currently, the earliest human beings known to be in Western Washington were present as of 13,800 BP. A mastodon kill site from that time period was excavated in Sequim in 1977.

From 12,000 BP to 10,000 BP, the area got a wider variety of trees, and became a closed forest. The vegetation was similar to today with Alnus rubra (red alder), Picea sitchensis (sitka spruce), Pinus contorta (lodgepole pine), Pseudotsuga (Douglas fir), and Tsuga heterophylla (Western hemlock).

The official end of the Pleistocene Epoch and the beginning of the Holocene Epoch occurred in 11,700 BP.

Between 9,500 and 4,500 BP during the Holocene climatic optimum, temperatures in the area were around 2 ± 1 °C (3.6 ± 1.8 °F) warmer than present with 45 ± 5% less precipitation. Between 9,500 and 5,000 BP, there was Alnus (alder), Pseudotsuga (Douglas fir), Pteridium (bracken fern), and high amounts of Chrysolepis (chinkapin) and Quercus (oak trees).

== Sequence of lakes ==
| Date (years before present) | Event |
|---|---|
| 18800 | The weight of the ice begins to depress the earth crust. The Puget Sound troughs and basin had been created previously. |
| 18300 | Corderillian Ice Sheet has filled the Strait of Georgia southward out into the Strait of Juan de Fuca, where it floats on the ocean. The glacial front is north of the junction of the Hood Canal to Admiralty Inlet and fills the Whidbey Basin. The outwash plains fill the entrance of the Hood Canal, Admiralty Inlet and Possession Sound from north of Everett to the southern end of Whidbey Island. The ice continued to move southward at an average rate of 450 feet (140 m) per year. |
| | Three freshwater lakes filled the basin. Nearly the entire length of the Hood Canal was open water. To the east the largest body of water filled the East Passage, the Dalco Passage (Tacoma) with a river like basin along the west of Vashon Island. A separate lake flowed from the Case Inlet and Nisqually Reach west of Tacoma through the narrows into the river running north through the Colvos Passage. |
| 18100 | The ice sheet continues its southward progression, separating the Hood Canal from the other basins in Puget Sound. The ice front is just north of Seattle and the outwash plain covers all of Elliott Bay, from just north of West Point south to Blake Island. |
| | Three freshwater lakes that had been created early continued to exist, growing small as the ice front moved south. |
| 17800 | The ice sheet has created a uniform arched front running from Dosewallips River mouth, southeast across the Kitsap Peninsula, through Bremerton, arcing across the southern tip of Vashon Island, ending in the Green River valley in the area of Kent. Outwash plains fill the mid reaches of the Hood Canal, the Clifton Channel and 3 to 5 miles (4.8 to 8.0 km) in the Carr Inlet, Colvos Channel, Quartermaster Harbor, and the East Passage of Puget Sound and a similar plain in the valley of the Green River from Kent to Auburn. |
| | A single freshwater lake extends across the glacial front, covering the lower Hood Canal and the lower hills north of the Black Hills north of Olympia. A smaller body of water fills the valleys of the Puyallup and White Rivers. |
| 17500 | The ice front reached to just north of Olympia. The entire basin of the Puget Sound was filled with ice. A small outwash plain covered 2 to 3 miles (3.2 to 4.8 km) in an arch from the heights south of the Hood Canal south and eastward to the Eastern bluffs of the Nisqually River mouth. A narrow band of water lay to the south of this plain and covered the area where Olympia now stands. |
| 16900 | The ice front reached its southernmost point. It skirted the east face of the Olympic Mountains, south to the plains north of the Black Hills, skirting their northern hills, reaching southward into the Black River Valley to its junction with the Chehalis River. The front rested on the flanks of Mount Rainier, turning northward, joined by numerous small glaciers in the valleys of the eastern front of the Cascade Mountains. There was 3,000 feet (910 m) of ice over Seattle and the land was depressed 275 feet (84 m) Pioneer Sq. |
| 16600 | The ice began to retreat after 16900 ya. By 16600, it had returned to north of Olympia, as it was 1000 years earlier. |
| 16500 | The ice continued to retreat. Still standing south of Tacoma, substantial freshwater bodies had formed. Lake Skokomish stood in the southern bend of the Hood Canal and the lower reaches of the Skokomish River. Early Lake Russell or a late version of Lake Nisqually. |
| 16400 | Continuing to recede to the north, the ice front reaches from the south side of Tacoma in a northwest arc across the Kitsap Peninsula, exposing the southern hook of Hood Canal, reaching the Olympic Mountains near Quilcene Bay. |
| | A large freshwater body formed. |
| 16300 | The ice front became anchored on the west among the Olympic Mountains near Quilecene Bay. Lake Russell spread across the southern basins of Puget Sound. Lake Hood drained across its southern outlets into Lake Russell. From Tacoma, the ice lay ice front lay 7 to 10 miles (11 to 16 km) to the north and lay across the Green River at Kent. |
| 16300 | Within a very short period, the glacier retreated up to 15 miles (24 km) in a few decades. Bremerton and Renton are now ice free. |
| 16200 | Continuing the advanced rate of retreat, Seattle becomes the southern tip of the ice sheet. The Hood Canal has fully joined with Lake Russell, leaving only the highest points the Kitsap Peninsula standing above the shore. |
| 16100 | The retreat appears to have slowed or halted with evidence that the ice sheet was thinning, rather than receding. The water levels of Lake Russell have dropped correspondingly. |
| | The upper end of the Stillaguamish River has formed a freshwater lake. Lake Washington and Lake Sammamish appear as water bodies along the southern margin of the lake. |
| 16000 | The ice front has receded north opening the mouth of Hood Canal and lies just south of the southern end of Whidbey Island. |
| | The length of the Stillaguamish River is a freshwater lake. Lake Sammamish has linked to Lake Washington along its present watercourse with Lake Washington draining across Lake Union and then only through the Duwamish River at its south end. |
| 15900 | The ice front has receded north into the Strait of Juan de Fuca, linking the Puget Sound Basin to the ocean. The Duwamish-Green River Valley was salt-water reach of the sound. The Stillaguamish River is also a salt-water branch of the sound. |
| 7500 | Except for the Duwamish-Green River saltwater embayment, the modern waterways have formed into the waterways known today. The Whidbey basin has taken a rudimentary form, with the Stillaguamish River flowing into Port Susan Passage and Skagit Bay has appeared. |
| 5500 | Mt Rainier's northern crest collapsed sending a lahar down the White River. This creates the Auburn delta in the Duwamish Embayment, separating the Puyallup River valley from the Green River valley. |
| 2100 | An eruption of Mt Rainier sends sand lahars down White River to its junction with the Duwamish at Tukwila. |
| 1100 | Duwamish valley earthquake lifts the Duwamish valley by 20 feet (6.1 m) draining what was left of the salt-water embayment, creating the Duwamish delta and what has become the Port of Seattle. |
