= Puyallup Glacier =

Glacier on Mount Rainier, Washington, United States

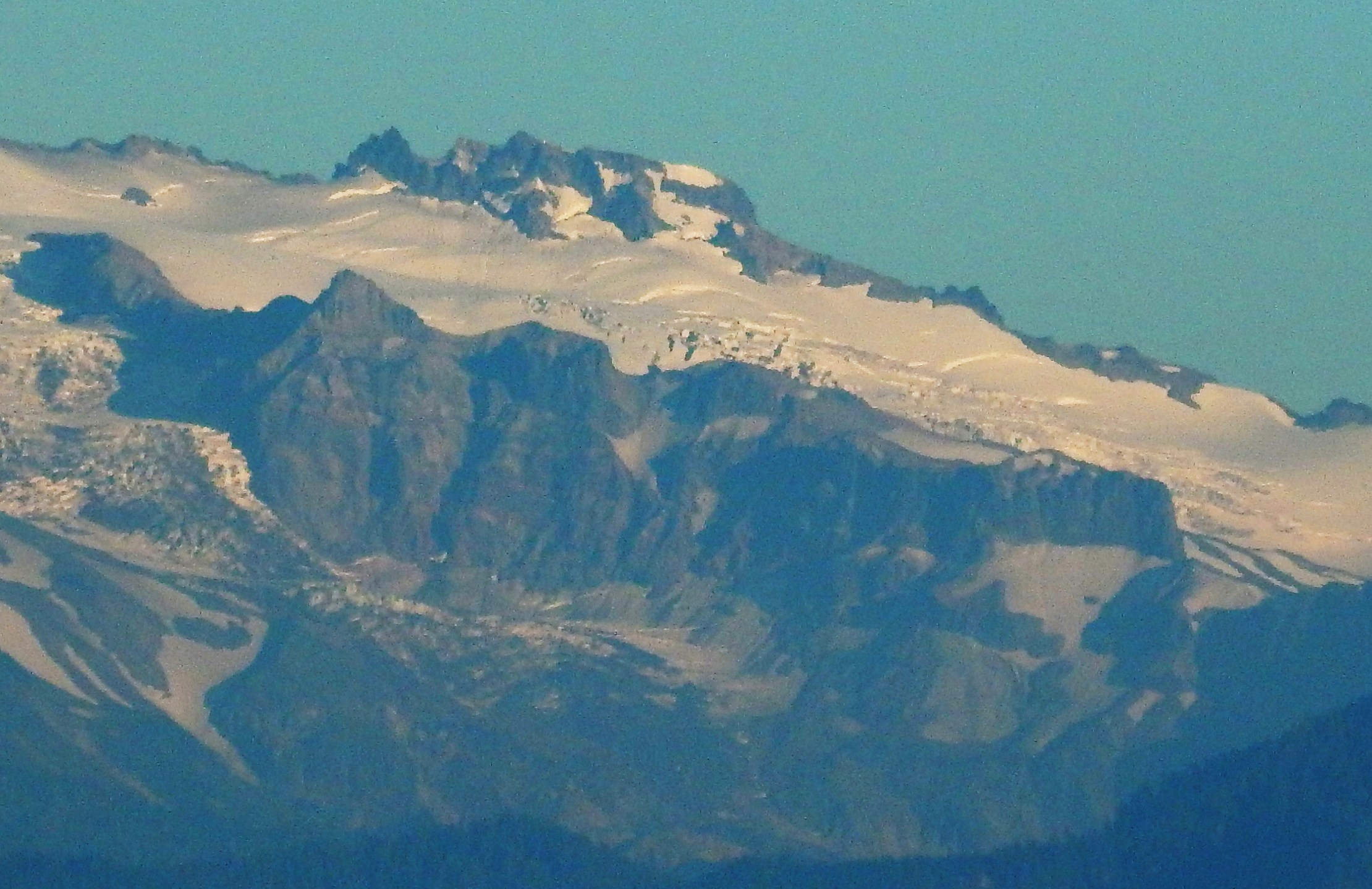
- Puyallup Glacier and Puyallup Cleaver
- Interactive map of Puyallup Glacier
- Type: Mountain glacier
- Location: Mount Rainier, Pierce County, Washington, USA
- Coordinates: 46°50′59″N 121°49′27″W
- Area: 2.0 square miles (5.2 km^{2}), 1983

The Puyallup Glacier is a glacier on the west flank of Mount Rainier in Washington. It covers 2.0 square miles (5.2 km^{2}) and contains 10.2 billion ft^{3} (289 million m^{3}) of ice. Sharing the same source of ice as the northern South Mowich Glacier, the Puyallup Glacier begins as a branch off the ice stream that flow out of the Sunset Amphitheater. From the split at around 8,500 feet (2,600 m), the glacier expands into a broad sheet of ice ranging from 8,400 feet (2,600 m) to 7,400 feet (2,300 m) in elevation. Leaving the large expanse of ice, the glacier flows down a small valley, it narrows significantly as it turns northwestward. From there on, the glacier is dirty and ends on steep, uneven terrain at about 6,000 ft (1,800 m). The glacier gives rise to the Puyallup River.

== See also ==
- List of glaciers
