= Puyallup River =

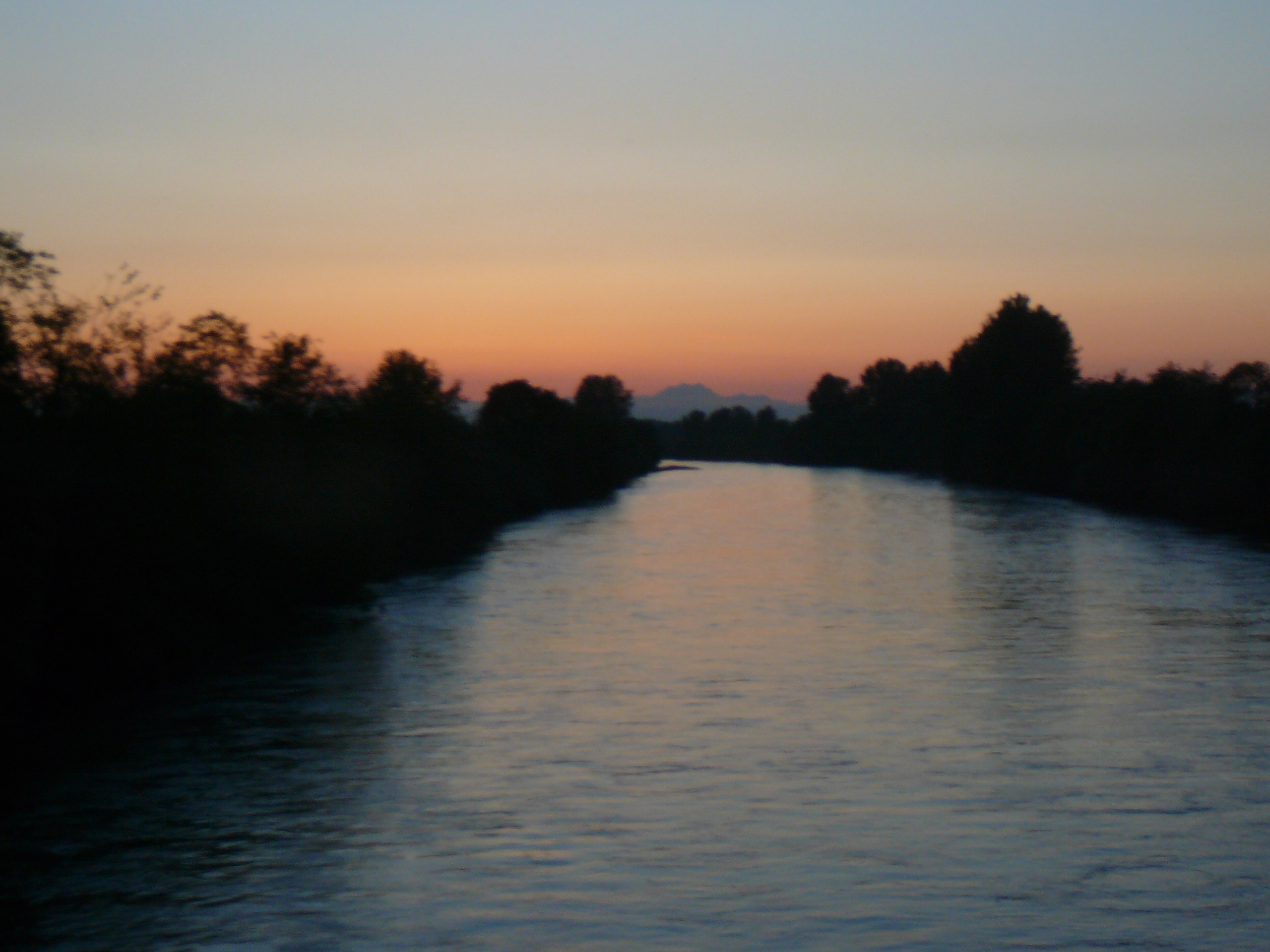
- View of the Puyallup River between River Road and North Levee Road. The river separates Fife from Tacoma.

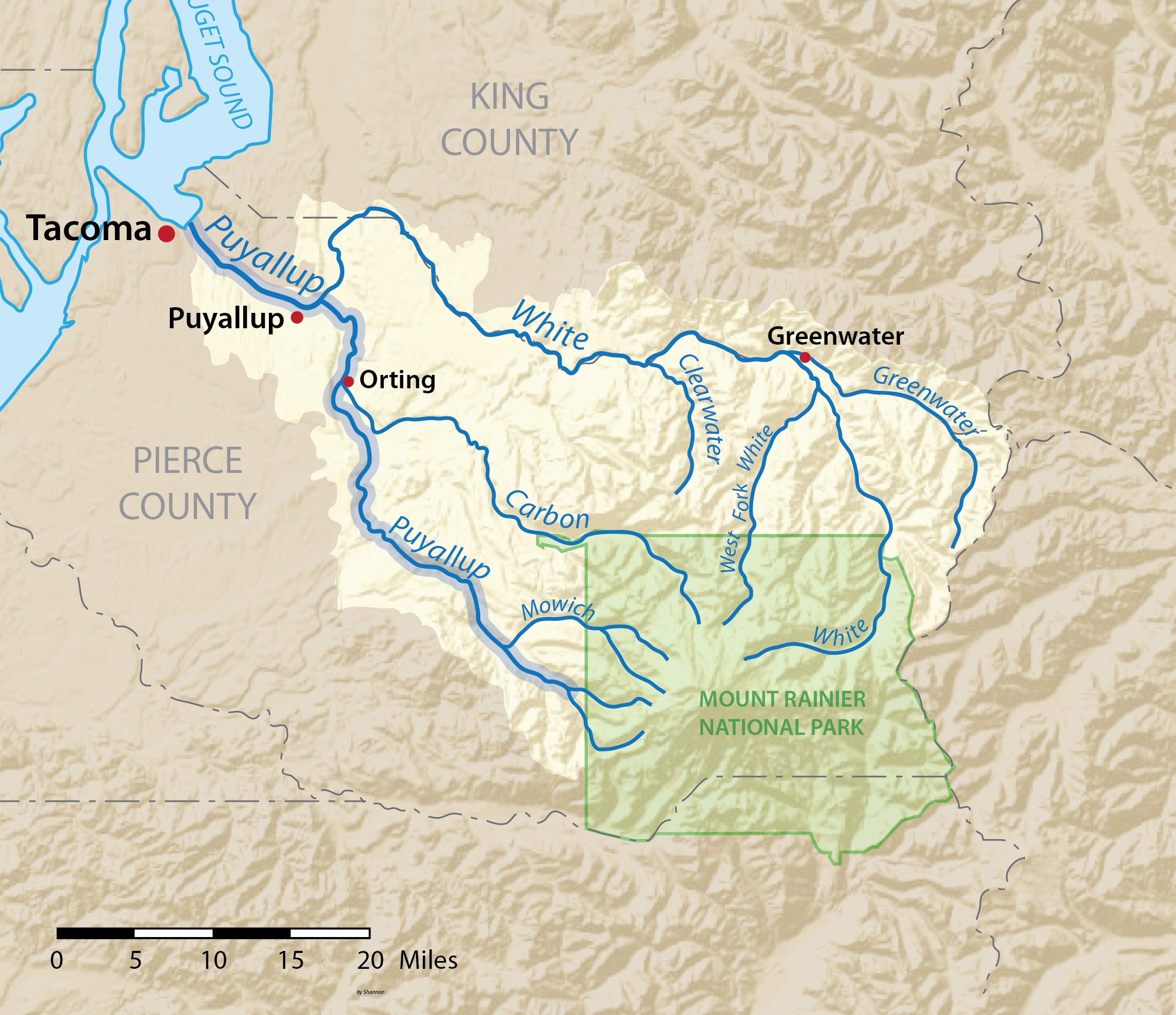
- Map of the Puyallup River watershed

- Location of the mouth of the Puyallup River in Washington Puyallup River (the United States)

Location
- Country: United States
- State: Washington
- Counties: Pierce
- Cities: Orting, Puyallup, Tacoma

Physical characteristics
- Source: Mount Rainier
  - coordinates: 46°51′50″N 121°57′4″W
  - elevation: 2,280 ft (690 m)
- Mouth: Puget Sound
  - location: Commencement Bay
  - coordinates: 47°16′10″N 122°25′42″W
  - elevation: 0 ft (0 m)
- Length: 45 mi (72 km)
- Basin size: 948 sq mi (2,460 km^{2})
- Discharge
  - location: Puyallup
  - average: 3,313 cu ft/s (93.8 m^{3}/s)
  - minimum: 400 cu ft/s (11 m^{3}/s)
  - maximum: 57,000 cu ft/s (1,600 m^{3}/s)

Basin features
- Tributaries
  - right: Mowich River, Carbon River, White River

The Puyallup River (/pjuːˈæləp/ pyew-AL-əp) is a river in the U.S. state of Washington. About 45 miles (72 km) long, it is formed by glaciers on the west side of Mount Rainier. It flows generally northwest, emptying into Commencement Bay, part of Puget Sound. The river and its tributaries drain an area of about 948 square miles (2,460 km^{2}) in Pierce County and southern King County.

The lower, northwestern half of the river's watershed is a complex amalgam of glacial and tectonic features dating back to the Pleistocene, as well as more recent (Holocene) changes caused by a series of lahars which flowed down from Mount Rainier between 5,600 and 800 years Before Present. The valley's 150,000 residents are at risk from future lahars. For this reason, the United States Geological Survey has installed a lahar warning system.

== Course ==
The upper watershed of the Puyallup River flows off of Mount Rainier through the South Cascade Range of Washington towards the lowlands surrounding Puget Sound. The Puyallup River begins from two forks, the North Puyallup River and the South Puyallup River. The North Puyallup River flows from the toe of Puyallup Glacier, while the South Puyallup River flows from Tahoma Glacier. The two streams flow through the western part of Mount Rainier National Park, joining just outside the park boundary and forming the Puyallup River proper, which then flows generally north and northwest until it reaches the edge of the foothills near the town of Electron. A third significant tributary, the Mowich River, flows down from the Edmunds and North Mowich Glaciers, on the northwestern slopes of Mount Rainier, and joins the Puyallup River slightly more than 7.3 kilometers (4.5 miles) northwest of the fork. The river is dammed at Electron Diversion Dam shortly below the Mowich confluence. The dam diverts a portion of the Puyallup River into a long flume, which runs for several miles to Electron, where the water is passed through turbines in a hydroelectric powerhouse before being returned to the river. The Puyallup River passes through a steep and narrow gorge between Electron Dam and the powerhouse.

The main valley flows north from Electron along a lateral meltwater channel (a meltwater channel formed along the edge of a glacier) and into a larger subglacial meltwater channel (formed beneath the glacier), collecting the Carbon River on the way to Alderton and Sumner. At Sumner, the Puyallup River is joined by the White River and the valley splits in two, with the Lower Puyallup River Valley leading west-northwest to Commencement Bay along a fault trace associated with the Tacoma Fault Zone, and the Duwamish Valley continuing north along the purely glacial channel towards Seattle. At present, the Puyallup River follows the Lower Puyallup River Valley northwest past the cities of Puyallup and Fife, and through the Puyallup Indian Reservation, before emptying into Commencement Bay at the Port of Tacoma, part of the city of Tacoma.

== Natural history ==
The upper watershed (upstream of Electron) of the Puyallup River was created by the advance of alpine glaciers on Mount Rainier, limiting its maximum possible age to approximately 500,000 years when Mount Rainier was first formed. It is characterized by deep glacial valleys carved through the low mountains and rugged foothills of Washington's South Cascade Range.

The lower watershed (downstream of Electron) is much younger than the upper watershed: a combination of glacial and tectonic features less than 20,000 years old as well as changes caused by the Osceola Mudflow and younger lahars between 5,600 years Before Present and today. The main valley was originally part of a much larger lateral meltwater channel network formed during the Vashon Glaciation, which drained large portions of the Puget Sound Area as well as most of Washington's Cascade Range south into the Chehalis River prior to the unblocking of the Strait of Juan de Fuca around 14,800 years Before Present. After the retreat of the Cordilleran Ice Sheet allowed Puget Sound to connect with the Pacific Ocean through the Strait, the channel network fragmented into a collection of large, independent river valleys draining into Puget Sound. The Puyallup River's portion consisted of small section of lateral meltwater channel between Lake Kapowsin and Orting, a primary subglacial channel running north from Orting through the Duwamish Valley to Lake Washington, and a channel fork which split off at Sumner to follow a tectonic fault associated with the Tacoma Fault Zone.

At the end of the Vashon Glaciation, the majority of the valley in the lower watershed was dry: sea levels were 150 meters (490 feet) lower than they are today, although the land between Tacoma and Electron was also up to 30 meters (100 feet) lower due to the ice sheet's weight, and the shore of Puget Sound was likely at or very near Browns Point, almost 4 kilometers (2.5 miles) northwest of its present location. As both sea level and land level recovered from the glaciation, the valley flooded and became a saltwater embayment of Puget Sound which extended through the Puyallup and Duwamish Valleys from Kenmore, Washington, on what is now Lake Washington, to Orting at the foothills of the Cascade Range. Sediment from the Puyallup River, Carbon River, and White River steadily built up in the valley through the early Holocene, and by approximately 5,700 years Before Present the valley was filled in to Sumner, separating the Duwamish Valley from the fork running west-northwest to Tacoma. The Puyallup River split, emptying into Puget Sound to both the north and the west. Starting around 5,600 years Before Present and continuing to 800 years Before Present, a series of large mudslides from Mount Rainier flowed down the Puyallup River and White River watersheds and filled in the Puyallup and Duwamish Valleys, creating the present landscape.

Today, the Puyallup River and its tributaries are still fed by the glaciers of Mount Rainier. These glaciers continually provide sediment such as silt and gravel to the rivers, creating sand and gravel bars. The thick sediment deposits in the stream beds lower water capacity, which causes the river to meander and flood during periods of high streamflow. It also causes the rivers to become braided and meandering. During the summer, glacial meltwater dominates the streamflow, turning the Puyallup River turbid. In addition, the glaciers delay the onset of spring-summer runoff, compared to unglaciated river basins.

Historically, these factors resulted in frequent flooding and extensive floodplain wetlands, and provided a rich and complex habitat for fish and other animals. In addition, the river's mouth at Commencement Bay occupied an extensive tidal flat and wetland estuary delta. Urbanization and an extensive system of flood control structures such as dams, levees, and culverts, have radically altered much of the Puyallup River and its tributaries. The estuary delta at the mouth of the Puyallup River has been almost completely replaced with the facilities of the Port of Tacoma, with less than 5% of the original estuarine habitat remaining.

A fall run of chinook salmon occurs on the river. coho, chum, and pink salmon are also found in the river, along with steelhead, sea-run coastal cutthroat trout, and a threatened species, bull trout. Sockeye salmon are considered indigenous to the basin, but are rarely seen today.

== River modifications ==
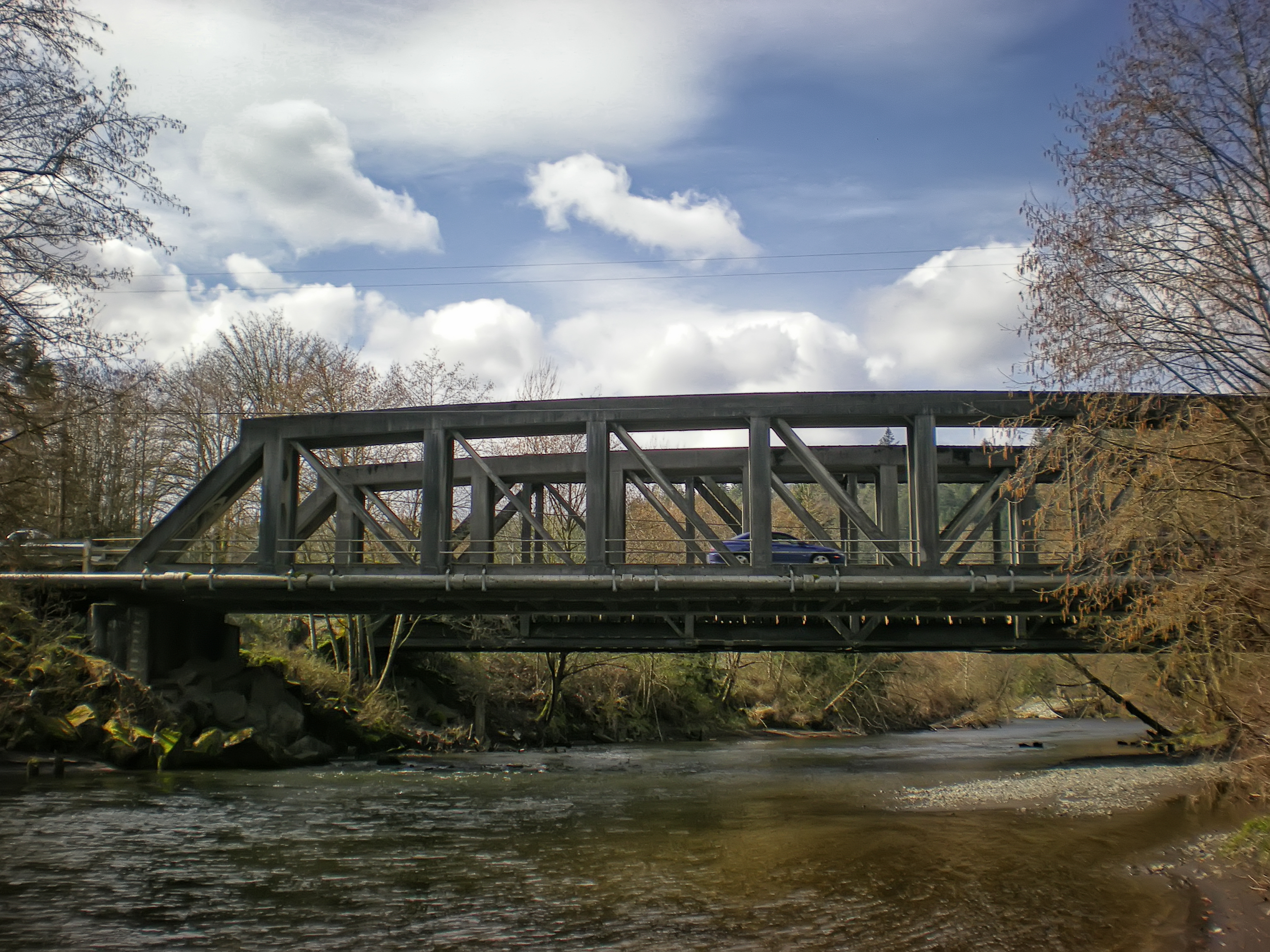
Bridge across the river at McMillin, Washington

The Puyallup River and its main tributary, the White River, have been subjected to major modifications during the 20th century. The Puyallup River between Sumner and its mouth at Tacoma was straightened. A diversion dam was built at Game Farm Park in 1914 to prevent the White River from flowing on its natural course into the Green River at Auburn; since then it has flowed into the Puyallup River instead of the Green River. Flood protection structures were built along many rivers in the basin, including extensive levees. A flood storage reservoir, Mud Mountain Lake, was created on the White River with the construction of Mud Mountain Dam. As part of the flood control efforts, river channels and embankments have been generally kept clear of debris such as gravel bars, large trees, logjams, and other woody debris. These modifications have radically altered the natural character of the rivers. River widths have been generally reduced. Water now fills nearly all of the land between river banks, instead of the historic pattern of braided meanders and wetlands.

== History ==
The river is named for the Puyallup tribe, who lived throughout the river basin. After the Treaty of Medicine Creek and the Puget Sound War the Puyallup were granted a reservation on the lower Puyallup River. The Treaty of Medicine Creek recognized native fishing rights on the Puyallup River. These rights were ignored for decades until Bob Satiacum was arrested in 1954 for fishing illegally on the river. His legal case continued for years and resulted in the 1974 Boldt Decision, which granted half of all fishing rights in Washington state to native tribes.

The Puyallup tribe continues to maintain several buildings and properties on reservation lands near the mouth of the river. They are stakeholders in many issues about the river, such as the amount of water diverted at Electron Diversion Dam.

The first known European to explore the Puyallup River valley was William Fraser Tolmie, who in August 1833 made a journey to the Mount Rainier area via the Puyallup and Mowich river valleys. Two Native American guides accompanied Tolmie, Lachalet, a Nisqually Indian, and Nuckalkat, a Puyallup.

== See also ==
- List of crossings of the Puyallup River
- List of Washington rivers
