= Hylebos Creek =

- Location of the mouth of Hylebos Creek in Washington Hylebos Creek (the United States)

Location
- Country: United States
- State: Washington
- Counties: King, Pierce

Physical characteristics
- Source: Unincorporated King County
  - location: Washington
  - coordinates: 47°16′45″N 122°18′30″W
  - elevation: 290 ft (88 m)
- Mouth: Commencement Bay
  - location: Washington
  - coordinates: 47°17′6″N 122°24′40″W
  - elevation: 0 ft (0 m)
- Basin size: 16.8 sq mi (44 km^{2})
- Discharge
  - location: Fife
  - average: 29.2 cu ft/s (0.83 m^{3}/s)
  - minimum: 3.5 cu ft/s (0.099 m^{3}/s)
  - maximum: 413 cu ft/s (11.7 m^{3}/s)

Hylebos Creek is a stream located in the U.S. state of Washington near Tacoma and emptying into Commencement Bay, part of Puget Sound. It flows through southern King County and northern Pierce County, through the cities of Tacoma, Federal Way, Milton, and Fife, as well as the Puyallup Indian Reservation.

== Course ==
The main stem of Hylebos Creek originates at an elevation of 290 feet (88 m), in unincorporated King County just south of the interchange of Interstate 5 (I-5) and Washington State Route 18 (SR 18), at 47°16′45″N 122°18′30″W. It flows generally south, collecting small tributaries including one that drains Lake Killarney. The creek enters Federal Way, turns to the southwest, flows through a ravine and enters Pierce County and the city of Milton. Just east of I-5 the creek is joined by its main tributary, West Hylebos Creek. From there Hylebos Creek flows south close to I-5, then turns northwest. At the southern end of the creek's bend along I-5 it is joined by a long tributary from the east, which drains Surprise Lake. Parts of this tributary stream are channelized ditches running in straight lines and turning sharp 90-degree corners. Hylebos Creek continues northwest from this tributary's confluence, crossing a small corner of Fife's Lower Hylebos Nature Park before entering the Port of Tacoma, part of the city of Tacoma. The creek empties into Hylebos Waterway, an inlet of Commencement Bay and part of Puget Sound. The mouth of Hylebos Creek is located at 47°17′06″N 122°24′40″W, where Hylebos Waterway joins Commencement Bay.

West Hylebos Creek originates at an elevation of 229 feet (70 m), in Federal Way, King County in West Hylebos Wetlands Park, at 47°17′21″N 122°19′34″W. It flows generally south, collecting first an intermittent tributary stream flowing from Panther Lake in Panther Lake Park, then a long tributary rising from North Lake and the vicinity of The Commons shopping center, then flowing south along the west side of I-5. At the interchange of I-5 and SR-18 this tributary turns west toward West Hylebos Wetlands Park, then south, joining West Hylebos Creek in southern Federal Way. From this confluence, West Hylebos Creek continues south to join the main stem Hylebos Creek at 47°15′06″N 122°19′54″W, elevation 22 feet (6.7 m). A significant portion of West Hylebos Creek's course consists of wetlands.

== History ==
Hylebos Creek is named after Peter Francis Hylebos, a Catholic priest born in Belgium who founded schools and hospitals in Washington Territory.

== See also ==
- List of rivers of Washington (state)
