= Puyallup people =

Coast Salish people of southern Puget Sound

spuyaləpabš
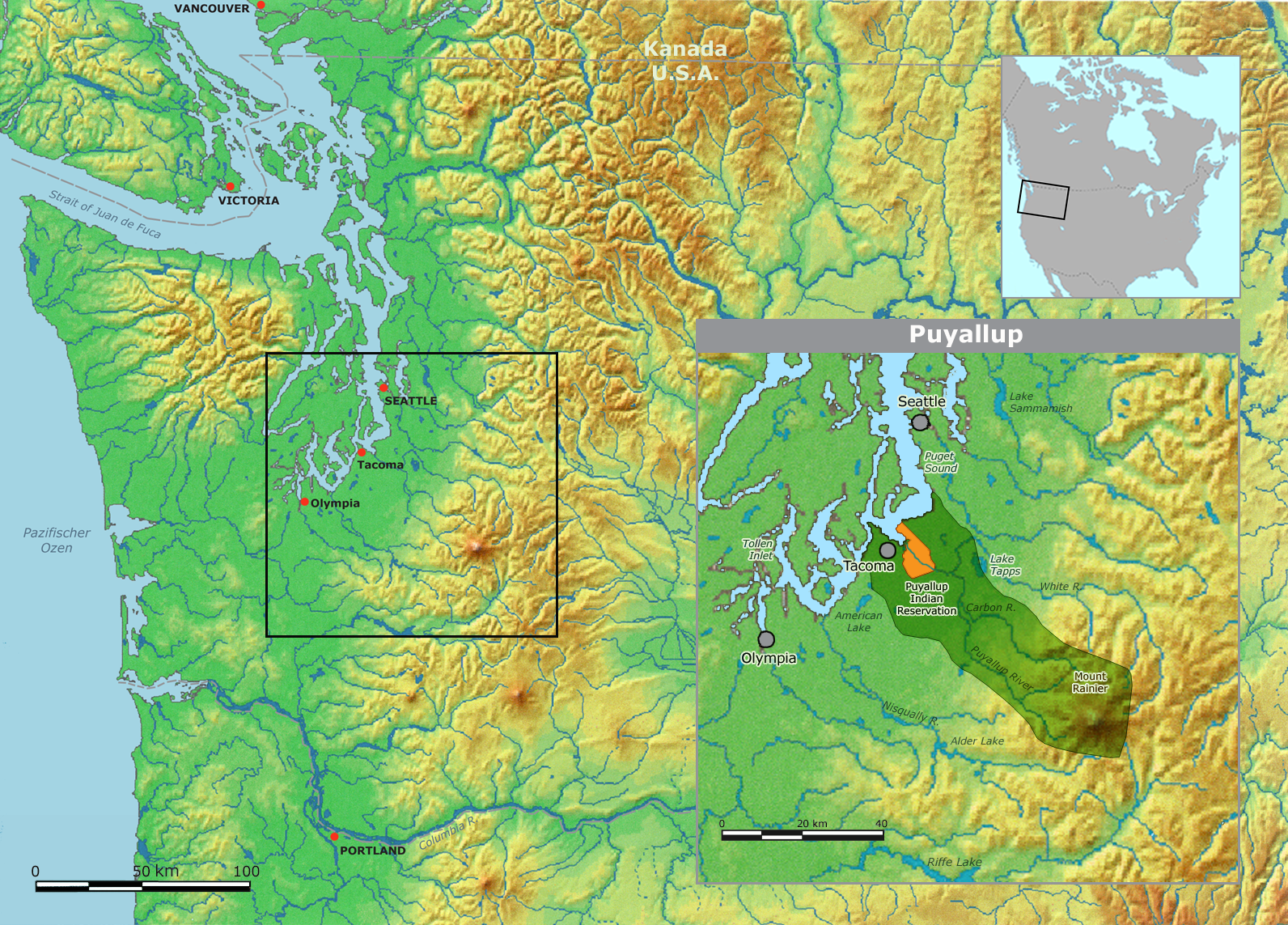

Total population
- 6,700

Regions with significant populations
- Washington, United States

Languages
- Lushootseed (Twulshootseed); English

Religion
- Traditional religion; Christianity, incl. syncretic forms (Indian Shaker Church)

Related ethnic groups
- Other Lushootseed-speaking peoples

The Puyallup (pew-AL-əp; Lushootseed: spuyaləpabš, lit. 'people of the bend' (Note: Lushootseed pronunciation: [spoʲˈɑːləpabʃ], spoy-AH-ləp-ahbsh)) are a Lushootseed-speaking Southern Coast Salish people indigenous to the Puget Sound region of Washington state. They are primarily enrolled in and represented by the Puyallup Tribe of Indians, a federally-recognized Indian tribe located near Tacoma.

For centuries, the Puyallup and their sub-groups had several villages along the Puyallup River and the nearby coastline. Each village was autonomous, but united in a shared culture, language, and history. In 1854, the Puyallup were signatories to the Treaty of Medicine Creek, which ceded their land to the United States in return for the Puyallup Reservation and several other treaty rights. Following the controversial treaty, they participated in the Puget Sound War, eventually resulting in the 1856 Fox Island Council which increased the size of their reservation. Since then, the Puyallup people have continued to fight for their language, culture, and treaty rights.

== Name and etymology ==
The name "Puyallup" is an anglicization of the Lushootseed word spuyaləpabš. The name means "people of the bend (at the bottom of the river)," literally s√puy=áləp=abš, from the root √puy̓, 'curve'; the suffix =alap, 'leg or hip'; and the suffix =abš, 'people', and refers to the way that the Puyallup people live on the winding river. The name refers to the population center of the Puyallup near the mouth of the Puyallup River near what is now downtown Tacoma. According to anthropologist Marian Smith, the name puyaləp on its own refers to Puyallup River (specifically the area downriver of its confluence with the Carbon River), meaning "bend at the bottom". However, this is contested by linguist T. T. Waterman, who says that the name puyaləp is restricted only to a specific location below a bluff, where the river used to flow, and the location of a former village.

The name spuyaləpabš traditionally referred to two groups: the Puyallup proper (also sometimes called the "real" Puyallup), who had four villages near the mouth of the Puyallup River, as well as the other peoples who were not spuyaləpabš exactly, but did live along the upper Puyallup drainage. Today, the term even more broadly refers to any people who moved to the Puyallup Reservation, which included peoples who did not live along the Puyallup River, such as the Homamish, Shotlemamish, and Steilacoom.

== Classification and subgroups ==
The Puyallup are a Southern Coast Salish people, along with the other Lushootseed-speaking peoples and the Twana. The broader Coast Salish are a group of linguistically and ethnically related peoples along the Northwest Coast, generally centered around the Salish Sea and its tributaries. Although they have different languages, customs, and cultures, they share many broader cultural elements. Among the Southern Coast Salish, the nations are linked by strong cultural, linguistic, ceremonial, and family ties. Historically, they were also linked through alliances, marriages, joint feasting, and territorial usage.

The peoples of the Puget Sound traditionally classed themselves into broader ethnic units stemming from their relationships to the land. While all Puyallup villages were spuyaləpabš, i.e., from the Puyallup River, they were part of several larger units that modern anthropologists have classed as ethnic groups: saltwater people, river people, prairie people, and inland people. While the people of the qal̕qaləqʷ village identified as saltwater people, the other three Puyallup villages were river people.

Prior to the reservation period, all peoples living along the Puyallup River were seen as belonging to the Puyallup in a broad sense. However, they were indeed their own sovereign villages who were not controlled by the Puyallup proper. Today, they may be classified as "subgroups" or "bands" of the Puyallup, although this is somewhat anachronistic, as the many villages along the coastline and rivers of Puget Sound formed a continuous weave far beyond the Puyallup, linking neighboring autonomous villages to one another up and down the coast.

=== Puyallup River peoples ===
The sx̌ax̌ƛ̕abš had their village on Hylebos Creek in Fife Heights. Formerly, the creek was used primarily for fishing silver salmon. Their name is derived from the Lushootseed name of Hylebos Creek, sx̌ax̌ƛ̕, 'a little difficult or brushy'.

The txʷskʷawqʷabš were a band centered on Clarks Creek, the location of their village. They were allied closely with a Steilacoom village on Clover Creek. Their name is derived from txʷskʷawqʷ, 'full of ravens', the name of Clarks Creek.

The sqʷədabš (also recorded sqʷadabš, and not to be confused with the identically named sqʷədabš (Squinamish) on the Skagit River) had a village at the mouth of Simons Creek, where it entered Wapato Creek. The name is derived from the name of Simons Creek, which is sqʷəd, 'waterfall'.

The Stuck people (Lushootseed: stəx̌ʷabš), (also called the Stuck River people; not to be confused with the Stkamish, a nearby people living on the Green River), had their main village near the confluence of the Puyallup and Stuck rivers, close to what is now Sumner. The name, stəx̌ʷabš, derived from the name of the Stuck River itself, stəx̌ʷ, 'pull, drag'. This references how the Stuck River once flowed down the Wapato Creek bed, rather than directly into the Puyallup River as it does today. The village was originally located along that channel, but moved to the contemporary confluence after the river's flow changed. According to Puyallup oral tradition, whales were trapped inland, and in their attempts to gain access to the sound, they created the valley through which the Stuck flows. This village was closely allied to the Duwamish and Smulkamish.

One group of people, whose exact name is uncertain, had their village on the upper Puyallup River, above its confluence with the Carbon River. Their name, which is "identical" to c̓iyatkʷuʔ, according to T.T. Waterman, is unclear to modern scholars. According to Marian Smith, it is derived from the name of the Puyallup River above the Carbon River. However, according to Waterman, it is only the name of a creek near the Puyallup River. According to oral tradition, the name is derived from the words of a girl who was occasionally seen in the area. It was suspected she was a c̓iyatkʷuʔ, or at least captured by the c̓iyatkʷuʔ, creatures in indigenous Puget Sound folk tales which stalk the forests at night, whistling to imitate birds. They capture women, and the girl in the stories was believed to be held captive by c̓iyatkʷuʔ. When she was spotted, the only word she could be heard saying was the name of the stream, or, alternatively, the upper Puyallup River.

Tkwakwamish (Lushootseed: dxʷxʷaq̓ʷəbš) is the broad term for all the villages along the upper Puyallup drainage system, including the Carbon River, according to some anthropologists. Specifically, it is the name of a group of people whose village was located north-west of Orting, near where Vogt Creek enters the Carbon River. The name dxʷxʷaq̓ʷəbš is derived from the Lushootseed name for the Carbon River, dxʷxʷaq̓ʷ, 'Flowing from xʷaq̓ʷ (Mount Rainier)'. Although this name was applied to other villages along the Carbon River and its tributaries, the Tkwakwamish proper did not control them, and the other villages were autonomous, as were the other Puyallup villages.

One such autonomous village of the Tkwakwamish was located at what is now South Prairie, near the mouth of Cole Creek. This village, although it was Tkwakwamish and Puyallup, was closely allied with the Green River peoples (Such as the Skopamish and Yilkoamish) and the Snoqualmie, and were much closer related to them than their downriver neighbors. During the reservation period, the people of this village moved to the Muckleshoot reservation, rather than the Puyallup reservation.

=== Homamish ===
The Homamish (Lushootseed: sx̌ʷəbabš, lit. 'swift water people'; also called the S'Homamish or Sqababsh) were not originally considered part of the Puyallup in pre-contact times, however, they had strong alliances with the Puyallup historically, and during the reservation period, they joined the Puyallup on the Puyallup Reservation and became part of the modern Puyallup people. Their territory covered southern Vashon Island and much of the coastline west of the Tacoma Narrows, until Carr Inlet. Their main village was located at txʷaalqəɬ, 'place where deer exists', what is now Gig Harbor, and was founded many generations before the contact period by Puyallup people, likely from the sx̌ax̌ƛ̕abš group. For this reason, they were extremely closely connected with the Puyallup, especially the sx̌ax̌ƛ̕abš. They were also closely related to and allied with the Shotlemamish. Their two other villages were located on Vashon Island:

- sx̌alucid - Located at the head of Wollochet Bay, it was an "overflow" village founded by people from, and closely related to, the txʷaalqəɬ village. The name means "marked mouth", as it is referring to the mouth of Artondale Creek (Lushootseed: sx̌al), and is the origin of the name "Wollochet".
- Another village was located on Quartermaster Harbor. It was said to have been founded by a single Skagit man who married into the Homamish and nearby groups and built a large fortification with his family. He was constantly raiding the Duwamish, and, as he got older, eventually moved to the main village of txʷaalqəɬ sometime before 1854.

=== Shotlemamish ===
The Shotlemamish (Lushootseed: sx̌əƛ̕əbabš), like their Homamish neighbors, were not originally part of the Puyallup, however, as they moved to the Puyallup Reservation, they became part of the modern Puyallup people. They controlled Carr Inlet and had three villages:

- dəxʷsx̌əƛ̕əb – Located on the Purdy Sand Spit at Wauna, this village was the main settlement of the Shotlemamish. The name means "place of biting".
- The Shotlemamish also had a village at what is now Glencove. It was founded by the people from dəxʷsx̌əƛ̕əb.
- Another village was located at the head of Burley Lagoon. The village had disappeared by the early colonial period, either from becoming extinct or the people moving to the main village at dəxʷsx̌əƛ̕əb.

=== Steilacoom ===
The Steilacoom people (Lushootseed: č̓tilqʷəbš) historically controlled the Steilacoom Creek area and the nearby shoreline. They had two villages, one located at what is now Steilacoom, and the other on Clover Creek. They may have had another village, located at the present site of Spanaway. The Steilacoom were also closely tied with the Nisqually.

== History ==
According to Puyallup tradition, the Puyallup people were created by dukʷibəɬ, the Changer. dukʷibəɬ is the figure in Puyallup religion who made the world the way it is today by creating the Puyallup language, making animals smaller, and teaching the people how to live.

On December 24, 1854, the Puyallup attended the Treaty of Medicine Creek at McAllister Creek (Twulshootseed: šxʷnanəm or šxʷdadəb). Over three days, several representatives from the signatory tribes and the United States, represented by Territorial Governor Isaac Stevens, negotiated a treaty which established the 1,280-acre Puyallup reservation. The Puyallup signatories did not understand English, and the official website of the Puyallup Tribe states that it is believed that many signatures were forced or entirely forged.

The hasty treaty negotiations, poor reservation conditions, and persecution and outright murder of Native people resulted in growing tensions between several tribes and the United States. The Puyallup, along with several other tribes, fought the United States in the 1855–1856 Puget Sound War, also called the Treaty Wars or Indian Wars. During this period, the United States forced non-combatant Puyallup to be confined to Squaxin Island, to segregate them from the "hostiles". The war ended with the 1856 Fox Island Council, where a new treaty between the Puyallup and the United States was negotiated, which expanded or relocated the reservations previously established in the Treaty of Medicine Creek, in addition to the formation of the Muckleshoot Reservation.

Around 1870, a large contingent of Puyallup gamblers visited the Snoqualmie to challenge them to a large Slahal game and horse races. The Puyallup side was led by a man named sɬəy̓shal. After several days of playing, the Puyallup eventually defeated the Snoqualmie, both in the races and in Slahal.

Since the Fox Island Council in 1856, the Puyallup have continued to fight for treaty rights and civil rights, and were influential in the Fish Wars leading to the Boldt Decision of 1974.

== Territory and villages ==
By the contact period, the Puyallup had many villages along the Puyallup River, as well as along the nearby coastline of Puget Sound if those under the more broad definitions of Puyallup are included. The core of Puyallup population was near the Puyallup River mouth, and these Puyallup proper had just four known villages:

- puyaləp – This village was the largest and most important Puyallup village, and the people of this village were the "real" spuyaləpabš, and where the name is derived from. The village was located at the mouth the Puyallup River, in what is now downtown Tacoma near the intersection of 15th Street and Pacific Avenue.
- dəxʷwadačəb – This village was located just south of puyaləp, near what is now the intersection of 24th Street and Pacific Avenue. It was located on a creek that once flowed down a gully there, and has now dried up. The name dəxʷwadačəb means "place of the tide going out".
- Another Puyallup village was located near Clay Creek on the Puyallup reservation, near the former location of a boarding school called the Cushman School.
- qal̕qaləqʷ – This village was located near Fife on Wapato Creek (qal̕qaləqʷ) near the mouth.

== Culture ==
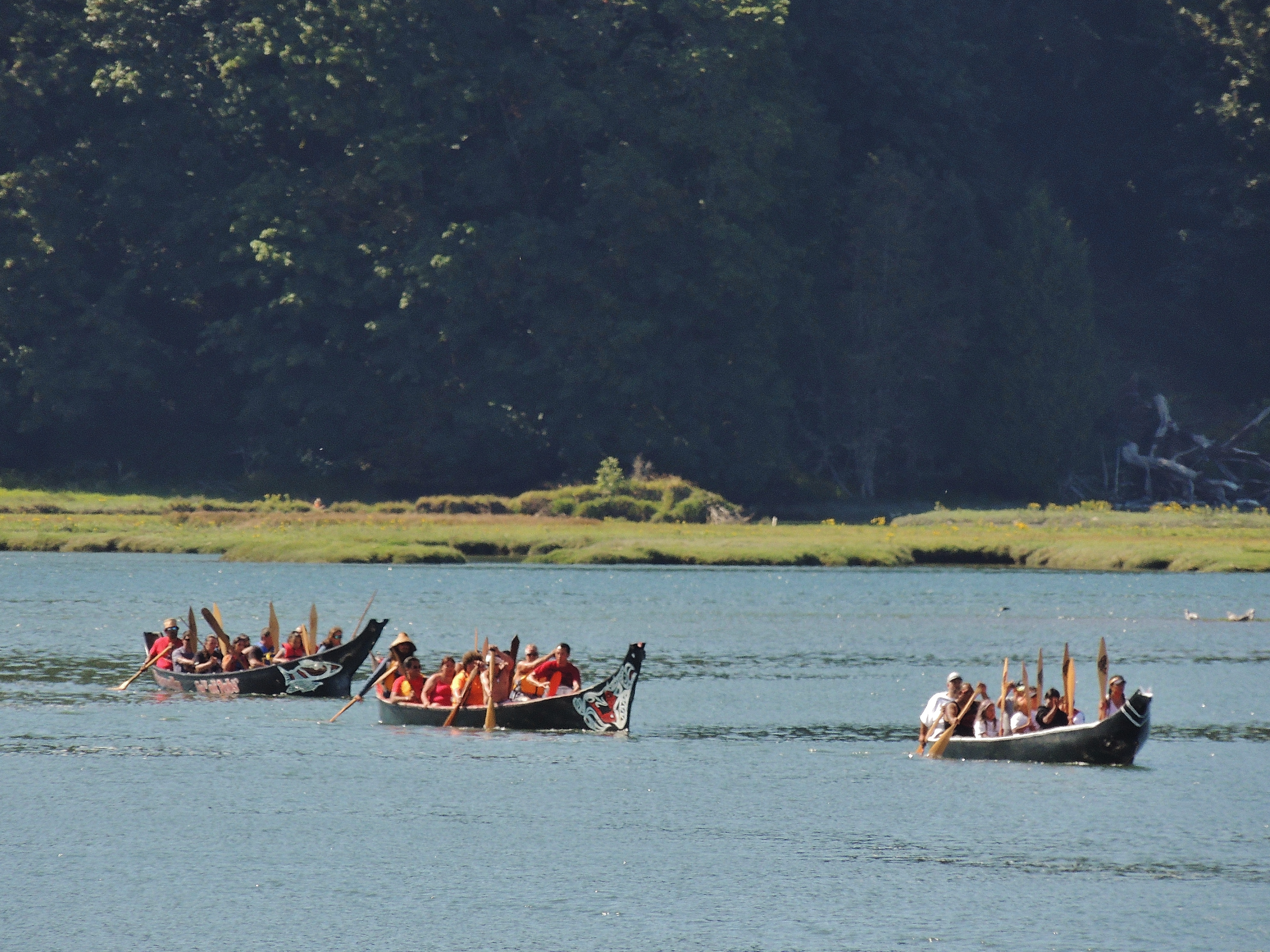
A Puyallup canoe (middle) heading to Medicine Creek alongside canoes from the Nisqually and Squaxin Island tribes

=== Architecture ===
The largest buildings of the Puyallup were large cedar longhouses. These structures were communal dwellings usually inhabited by four, six, or eight families with each family having their own section. Along the Puyallup River drainage, most longhouses were constructed in a gable-roof fashion.

The Puyallup also historically built "sweat houses;" small, round buildings made of maple posts and either a wooden roof made of cedar or fir, or a mat roof. The floor was dug out and replaced with stone, upon which cedar twigs and bark were laid to make a fire. Each house could hold up to one or two people. Sweat bathing was done for many reasons, including cleanliness and physical health. It was also an act of ritual purification for a myriad of scenarios: after intercourse, contact with blood (including menstruation and childbirth), or the murder of another, as preparation for hunting or gambling, before taking on a spirit quest, as an act of mourning, and in general, from a desire for spiritual purification. Additionally, villages would host competitions to see who could last inside a sweat house the longest. A sweat bath was immediately followed with a cold-water plunge.

=== Canoes ===
The main form of water transportation for the Puyallup was historically the canoe, of which there are six types: the war canoe, the freight canoe, the fishing canoe, river canoe (also called a shovel-nose canoe), the one-man canoe, and the children's canoe.

=== Food and sustenance ===
The traditional diet of the Puyallup was diverse, employing a mix of fish, meat, shellfish, berries, nuts, and other plants. Traditionally, fish were caught in a variety of ways, including with line and hook, traps, rakes, and spears. In addition, massive weirs were constructed over rivers and streams to aid in the catching of fish. These weirs were constructed by a series of sticks aligned in tripods with large poles as platforms to allow for walking across the weir. Weirs were owned and utilized by those who took part in its construction.

A non-alcoholic drink called stəgʷədalqʷuʔ was created by de-pulping and juicing salmonberries. After the introduction of alcohol, people began fermenting the drink for several weeks, turning it into an alcoholic beverage.

=== Religion ===
In traditional Puyallup culture, religion was at the very center of society. Skills, property, good health, even personality traits were believed to be obtained through a partnership with one or several powers. One's entire childhood was spent preparing to receive a power, and a power can come to anyone who displays purity and cleanliness, both of the body and spirit. In pre-colonial times, children went on a spirit journey to obtain a power when they reached maturity, undergoing a period of fasting, ritual bathing, and undertaking difficult tasks to prove oneself.

There are two main types of powers: sqəlalitut and dxʷdahəb. sqəlalitut powers helped one gain prestige in social life, and also were believed to cause people to develop certain personality traits. dxʷdahəb powers are special and only attainable by a person also called a dxʷdahəb (usually translated as shaman, doctor, or medicine man). People with these powers are believed to have the ability to both cure and cause death by sending their power into people. Someone whose affliction was caused by a shaman can only be cured by another shaman. Shamans who cannot control their powers are said to get sick and die. Traditionally, having powerful doctors living in a village brought social prestige to the inhabitants of the village, and doctors from different villages would "duel" against one another by sending their power at one another's relatives, which, if cured, would result in the aggressor shaman being inflicted with their own curse.

== Society ==
=== 19th century social structure ===
The Puyallup, like other Northwest Coast peoples, traditionally had a highly stratified society comprising three classes: high class (also called nobles), commoners (also called "nothing" people), and slaves. The noble class was by far the largest, with the slave class being the smallest. Membership in a class was determined by one's prestige, accumulated through bloodlines, property, reputation, deeds, and authority. A high class individual (siʔab) was identified by their accumulation of property, participation in religious and cultural customs, belonging to a village or family, and in general by their participation in society. The vast majority of people in traditional Puyallup society around this time were high class.

Low class or commoners were those who had no family or community or those who broke social taboos. Slaves were those captured in war. As they were viewed as property of their master, they could be bought or given away in potlatches like any other. A child of a slave was not a slave, but carried the social taboo from being of slave descent and faced challenges in rising to a higher class.

Authority in traditional Puyallup society was gained in several main ways. The first way was by being a highly respected professional in a field, such as being a master hunter or carver. The second way was through being a respected and well-liked public figure; a diplomat and leader who could take charge and advance the well-being of themself and others. Another way of gaining authority was being a skilled fighter. During wartime, brave warriors could quickly ascend to prominence for their daring acts and prowess, however, due to warfare being seen as a net negative and best to be avoided, warriors did not have much influence during peacetime and people attempted to tone down their warlike ways.

There were no chiefs or other formalized occupations of authority in traditional Puyallup society. Rather, authority was nominally entrusted in individuals who were respected by their community. Although their voice held influence and sway over others, they could not actually compel anyone to do anything. An entire village might have one leader or it might have several, depending on the needs of the people, although there was generally only one recognized as the leader of their field.

=== Government ===
Today, the Puyallup people are represented by the Puyallup Tribe of Indians, a federally-recognized tribe located in parts of King and Pierce counties. They control the 66.9 acre Puyallup Indian Reservation. The Puyallup Tribe is governed by the Tribal Council (Twulshootseed: sk̓ʷapad ʔə tiiɫ siʔiʔab, lit. 'council of leaders'), a democratically elected body which oversees the operation of the tribe.

=== Potlatches ===
The potlatch (sgʷigʷi) is a large gathering for the purpose of giving away gifts which can be both inter-tribal and intra-tribal. The potlatch system was historically the basis for friendly relations between different villages and tribes. Even today, potlatches can be held for many different reasons. Traditionally, the person throwing the potlatch invited important people from outside their village, who in turn, would invite whoever they wished to join them at the potlatch. Each group of guests would arrive at the potlatch on a different day, and, upon arrival, the leader of the group would sing their power song with their group of guests. Once all guests arrived, the host would begin giving away their possessions to the guests, and the host was expected to leave the potlach having lost a significant amount of wealth, if not all, as a show of dignity. During the festivities, other activities other than the main display of gift-giving would occur, such as marriages, guests giving gifts between each other, gambling, games, speeches, and singing.

Anthropologists Hermann Haeberlin and Erna Gunther believed that the potlatch was not an indigenous practice among the Puyallup. Instead, they believed that it was adopted from their nearby neighbors.
