= Kenneth Simmons =

American politician (1904–1981)

- Born: Kenneth Hopkins Simmons; February 2, 1904; Tacoma, Washington, U.S.
- Died: December 27, 1981 (aged 77); Pierce County, Washington, U.S.
- Resting place: Sumner Cemetery, Sumner, Washington
- Other name: Catsup
- Occupation: Mayor
- Known for: Milton Mule hoax
- Notable work: Bonney Lake, Washington
- Political party: Democrat
- Spouse: 2

Kenneth Hopkins Simmons (February 2, 1904 – December 27, 1981) was an American politician who served as mayor of Milton, Washington. He was also the founder and mayor of Bonney Lake, Washington in 1949. He is most known for his placing a mule, named "Boston Curtis", on the ballot for Republican precinct committeeman for Milton.

== Career ==
In 1938, Simmons entered Curtis into the election for the post of Republican precinct committeeman for Milton. He ran unopposed and was elected on September 13, 1938 by 51 votes, despite having run no election campaign, or offered a platform. Residents were surprised to learn that Curtis was actually a long-eared brown mule. Simmons stated that he had done this to demonstrate that many people vote without considering who they are actually voting for.

The mule later crossed the floor, joining the Stevens lobby.

On Halloween 1939, he hired a group of teenagers as special policemen for the night. Twenty teenagers from nearby Fife invaded Milton and challenged them to a fight. The Milton teenagers defended themselves with a fire hose, until one of the others was struck by the nozzle of the hose and had to be driven to a hospital with head injuries. State troopers eventually arrived to stop the fight.

After serving as mayor of Milton, Simmons served in the state legislature for three terms, representing the 25th district. Later, he and his family moved to Bonney Lake, where he helped the city incorporate and became its first mayor.
