= Ulumoo Ale =

American football player (born 1999)

Profile
- Position: Defensive tackle

Personal information
- Born: May 20, 1999 (age 27); Samoa
- Listed height: 6 ft 6 in (1.98 m)
- Listed weight: 327 lb (148 kg)

Career information
- High school: Fife (Fife, Washington, U.S.)
- College: Washington (2018–2023)
- NFL draft: 2024: undrafted

Career history
- Carolina Panthers (2024)*; BC Lions (2025)*
- * Offseason or practice squad member only

Ulumoo "M.J." Ale (born May 20, 1999) is a Samoan professional gridiron football defensive tackle who is currently a free agent. He played college football for the Washington Huskies.

== Early life ==
Ale was born in Samoa but spent the majority of his youth in Australia, where he was a three-time Australian Golden Gloves heavyweight champion boxer. He later moved to the United States and attended Fife High School in Fife, Washington. In Ale's junior season, he was named the 2A SPSL Mountain Division defensive lineman of the year, while in his senior season Ale was named the 2A South Puget Sound League Mountain Most Valuable Player. Coming out of high school, Ale was rated as a three star recruit where he decided to commit to play college football for the Washington Huskies.

== College career ==
In Ale's first season in 2019, he played in all 13 games for the Huskies. Between the 2020 and 2021 season, Ale played in sixteen games while making ten starts at guard for the Huskies. Ahead of the 2022, Ale switched from playing the offensive line to the defensive line. In Ale's first game as a defensive lineman in week one of the 2022 season, he recorded his first career tackle in a win over Portland State. During Ale's first season on the defensive line in 2022, he recorded 11 tackles with one being for a loss, and a pass deflection.

== Professional career ==
Pre-draft measurables
Height	Weight	Arm length	Hand span	Vertical jump	Broad jump	Bench press
6 ft 5 1/4 in (1.96 m)	327 lb (148 kg)	34 3/8 in (0.87 m)	10 in (0.25 m)	28.5 in (0.72 m)	8 ft 5 in (2.57 m)	32 reps
All values from Pro Day

=== Carolina Panthers ===
After not being selected in the 2024 NFL draft, Ale decided to sign with the Carolina Panthers as an undrafted free agent. He was waived on August 27, 2024.

=== BC Lions ===
On March 18, 2025, Ale signed with the BC Lions of the Canadian Football League (CFL). He was released on June 1, 2025.
