= Surprise Lake (Washington) =

Lake in Pierce County, Washington, United States

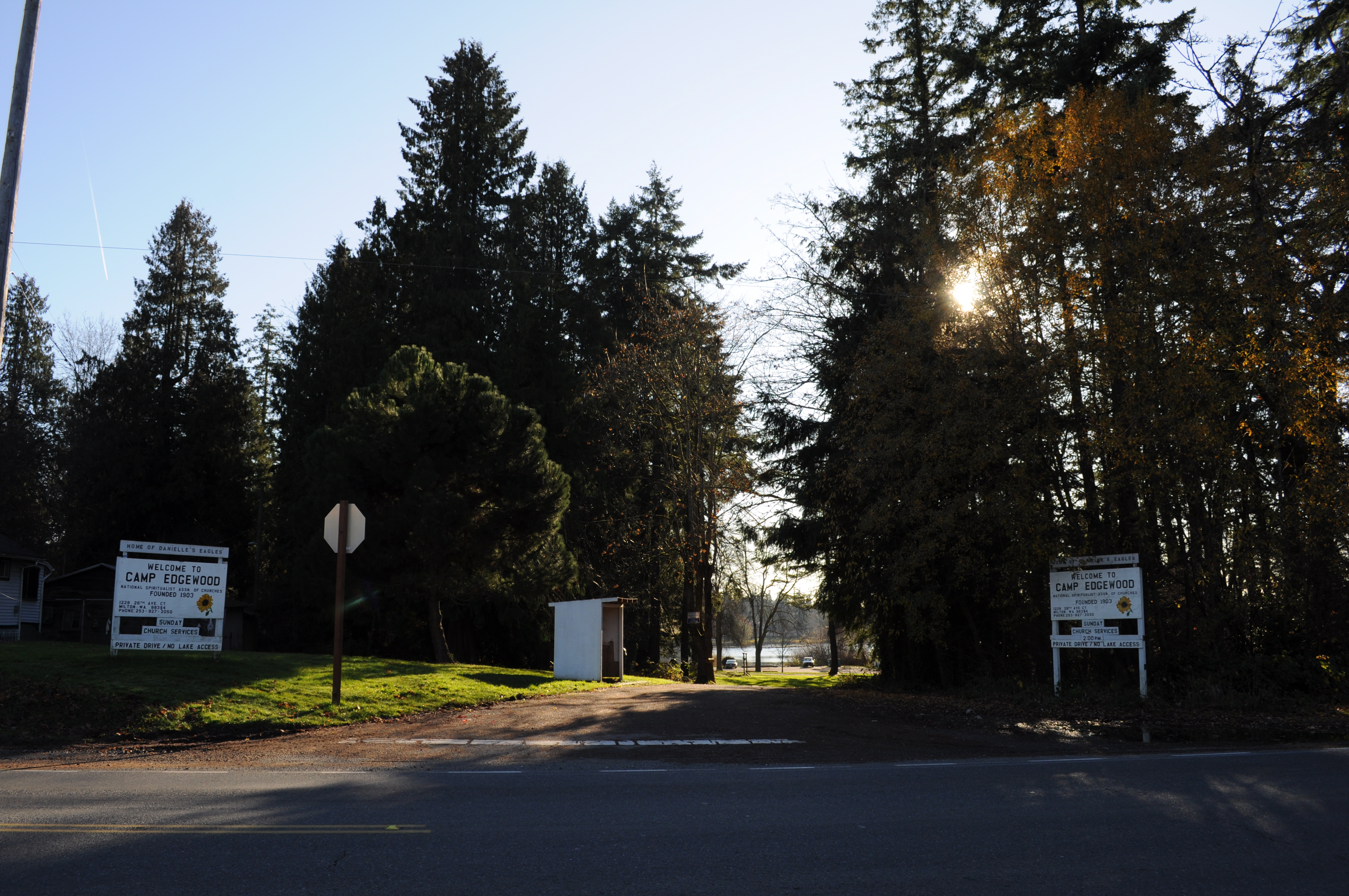
- The spiritualist Camp Edgewood on Surprise Lake

- Location within Washington (state) Location within the United States
- Location: Milton, Pierce County, Washington, United States
- Coordinates: 47°14′47″N 122°18′4″W
- Basin countries: United States
- Surface area: 3 acres (1.2 ha)
- Average depth: 50 ft (15 m)
- Surface elevation: 305 ft (93 m)

Surprise Lake is located next to The Dock at Surprise Lake apartment complex at Milton, Washington, United States. It is in the small city of Milton, near the slightly larger city of Fife, about 7 miles (11 km) from Tacoma.
