= Fife Heights, Washington =

- CDP
- Interactive map of Fife Heights, Washington
- Coordinates: 47°15′18″N 122°20′38″W
- Country: United States
- State: Washington
- County: Pierce
- Elevation: 417 ft (127 m)

Population (2010)
  - Total: 2,137
- Time zone: UTC-8 (Pacific (PST))
  - Summer (DST): UTC-7 (PDT)
- ZIP code: 9842[2]/[4]
- Area code: 253
- GNIS feature ID: 2584972

Fife Heights is a census-designated place (CDP) in Pierce County, Washington, United States. The population was 1,919 at the 2020 census. The community is bordered by Federal Way on the north, Milton on the east, Fife on the south, and Tacoma on the west. It is contained within the Puyallup Indian Reservation.

== Demographics ==
Historical population
Census	Pop.	Note	%±
2010	2,137		—
2020	1,882		−11.9%
U.S. Decennial Census; 2000 2010

Fife Heights first appeared as a census designated place in the 2010 U.S. census.

=== Racial and ethnic composition ===
Fife Heights CDP, Washington – Racial and ethnic composition Note: the US Census treats Hispanic/Latino as an ethnic category. This table excludes Latinos from the racial categories and assigns them to a separate category. Hispanics/Latinos may be of any race.
Race / Ethnicity (NH = Non-Hispanic)	Pop 2010	Pop 2020	% 2010	% 2020
White alone (NH)	1,625	1,198	76.04%	63.66%
Black or African American alone (NH)	79	89	3.70%	4.73%
Native American or Alaska Native alone (NH)	44	37	2.06%	1.97%
Asian alone (NH)	144	141	6.74%	7.49%
Native Hawaiian or Pacific Islander alone (NH)	17	31	0.80%	1.65%
Other race alone (NH)	2	10	0.09%	0.53%
Mixed race or Multiracial (NH)	93	202	4.35%	10.73%
Hispanic or Latino (any race)	133	174	6.22%	9.25%
Total	2,137	1,882	100.00%	100.00%

=== 2020 census ===
As of the 2020 census, Fife Heights had a population of 1,882. The median age was 40.2 years. 24.8% of residents were under the age of 18 and 13.8% of residents were 65 years of age or older. For every 100 females there were 100.4 males, and for every 100 females age 18 and over there were 101.7 males age 18 and over.

100.0% of residents lived in urban areas, while 0.0% lived in rural areas.

There were 622 households in Fife Heights, of which 35.9% had children under the age of 18 living in them. Of all households, 66.1% were married-couple households, 13.5% were households with a male householder and no spouse or partner present, and 15.6% were households with a female householder and no spouse or partner present. About 15.6% of all households were made up of individuals and 7.2% had someone living alone who was 65 years of age or older.

There were 657 housing units, of which 5.3% were vacant. The homeowner vacancy rate was 2.7% and the rental vacancy rate was 2.2%.

Racial composition as of the 2020 census
Race	Number	Percent
White	1,222	64.9%
Black or African American	92	4.9%
American Indian and Alaska Native	43	2.3%
Asian	141	7.5%
Native Hawaiian and Other Pacific Islander	31	1.6%
Some other race	80	4.3%
Two or more races	273	14.5%

== Education ==
Fife Heights is served by Fife Public Schools, a public school district.
