= Puyallup Tribe of Indians =

Federally recognized tribe in Washington (state)

Puyallup Tribe of Indians spuyaləpabš
- Federally-recognized Indian Tribe
- Logo

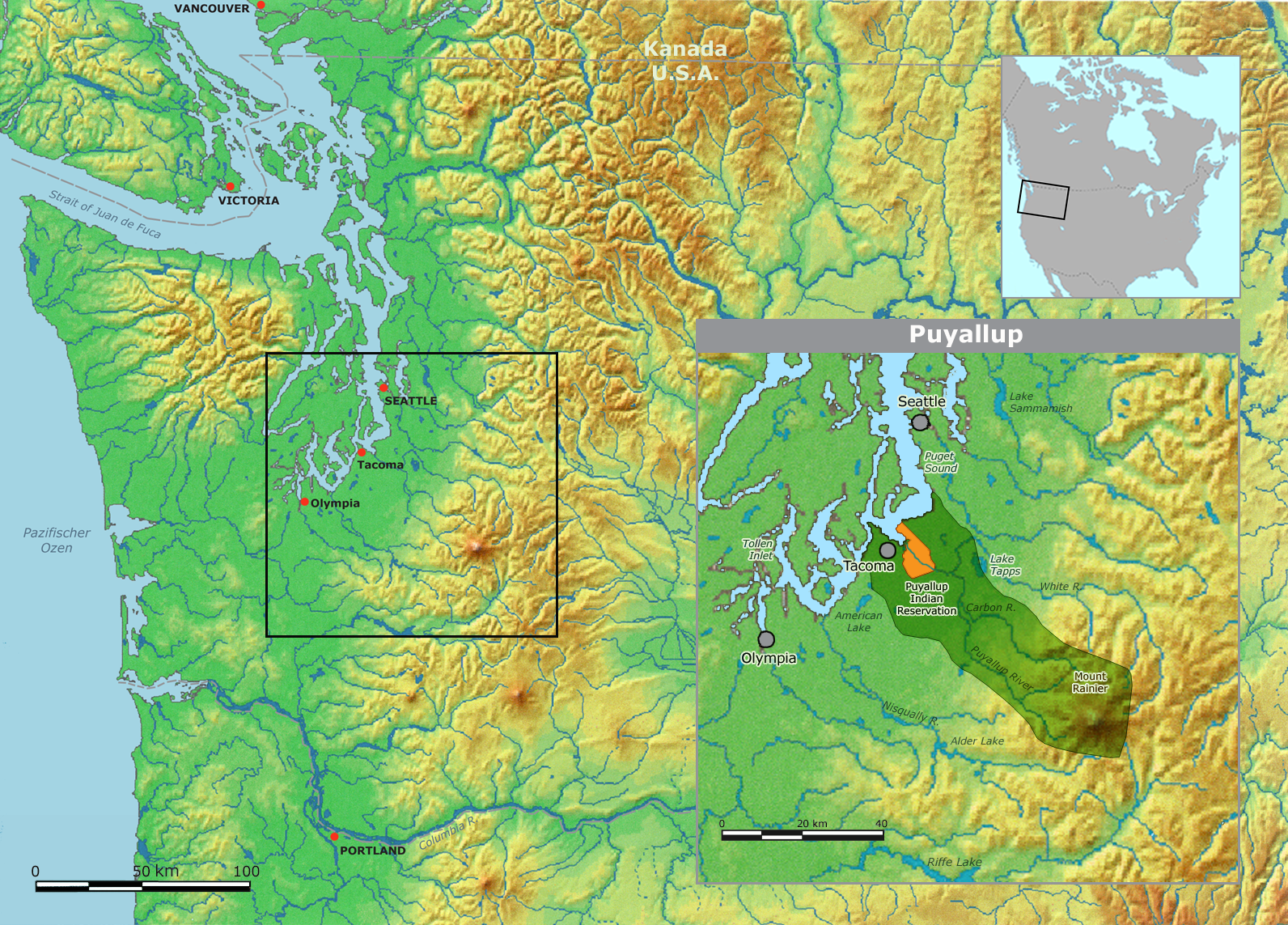
- Historic Puyallup territory and modern reservation
- Coordinates: 47°14′38″N 122°22′15″W
- Reservation created: 1854
- Reservation expanded: 1856
- Established: 1936

Government
  - Type: Federally-recognized Indian Tribe
  - Body: Tribal council (sk̓ʷapad ʔə tiiɫ siʔiʔab)
  - Chairman: Bill Sterud
  - Vice Chairwoman: Sylvia Miller

Area
  - Total: 73,935 km^{2} (28,546 sq mi)

Population
  - Enrolled members: 4,000
  - On-reservation: 2,500
- Demonym: Puyallup

The Puyallup Tribe of Indians (/pjuːˈæləp/ pew-AL-əp; Twulshootseed: spuyaləpabš, lit. 'people of the bend'; (Note: Lushootseed pronunciation: [spoʲˈɑːləpabʃ], spoy-AH-ləp-ahbsh) commonly known as the Puyallup Tribe) is a federally-recognized tribe of Puyallup people from western Washington state, United States. The tribe is primarily located on the Puyallup Indian Reservation, although they also control off-reservation trust lands.

The Puyallup Tribe was established in 1936 after the Indian Reorganization Act, although the reservation was established in 1854 in the Treaty of Medicine Creek. Currently, the tribe has approximately 4,000 citizens. Its membership is descended from the aboriginal Puyallup peoples, as well as other non-Puyallup peoples who were moved to the reservation. Other Puyallup citizens are descendants of other tribes. The population of Puyallup citizens who reside on the reservation is 2,500, which is 3.2% of the reservation's 41,000 total population.

The tribe's government is enshrined in its constitution, and is composed of an elected government, the Puyallup Tribal Council, and the three tribal courts: the Puyallup Tribal Court, the Puyallup Tribal Court of Appeals, and the Puyallup Tribal Children's Court. The laws of the Puyallup Tribe defined the authority of the courts as separate and equal to the Tribal Council.

== Government ==
In 1936 the Puyallup Tribe was officially formed under the Indian Reorganization Act, which authorized reservation tribes to create their own governments. The tribe wrote a constitution, which created an elected government (the Tribal Council), and created a Tribal Court for certain level of issues among its citizens.

The Tribe has two branches of government, the legislative and executive Tribal Council, and the judiciary, the Tribal Courts. Both branches of government are co-equal in the government of the Puyallup Tribe.

=== Tribal Council ===
The primary governing body of the Puyallup Tribe is the Tribal Council (Twulshootseed: sk̓ʷapad ʔə tiiɫ siʔiʔab, lit. 'council of leaders'). The council is an elected body of seven members who oversee the operation of the tribe and its programs. The Tribal Council is the voice of the Puyallup Tribe, and frequently makes statements on topics ranging from tribal law, environmental protection, to civil rights activism.

Originally, the council was composed of five members. In 1991, the council was increased from five to seven members. The tribal council currently has seven members as of February 2024:

- Chairman: Bill Sterud
- Vice Chairwoman: Anna Bean
- Annette Bryan
- Amber Hayward
- Sylvia Miller
- Tim Reynon
- Fred Dillon

=== Tribal Courts ===
In addition to the Tribal Council, the Puyallup Tribe also has a tribal court system. The tribe operates three separate court—the Puyallup Tribal Court, the Puyallup Tribal Court of Appeals, and the Puyallup Tribal Children's Court—which together operate the judicial branch of the government of the Puyallup Tribe of Indians. All three courts operate in the same facility.

== Economic development ==
Initially the federal government wanted Native Americans to develop the family farms then typical of European Americans. This was not a concept that the Puyallup were comfortable adopting. They remained deeply involved in fishing, which constituted such an important part of their culture that it is surrounded by ritual and spirituality.

With economic and social changes in the 20th and 21st centuries, the tribe needed to develop other sources of employment and income than farming for its people. In the 20th century, the tribe generated income through cigarette sales. They could sell them at a lower price and tax-free to non-Natives, as their reservation is sovereign territory and they need not pay state taxes from their businesses. In recent years, the tribe signed an agreement with the State of Washington to sell cigarettes with taxes paid. The tribe and the state have a sharing of tax revenue collected from sales of cigarettes.

=== Casino history ===
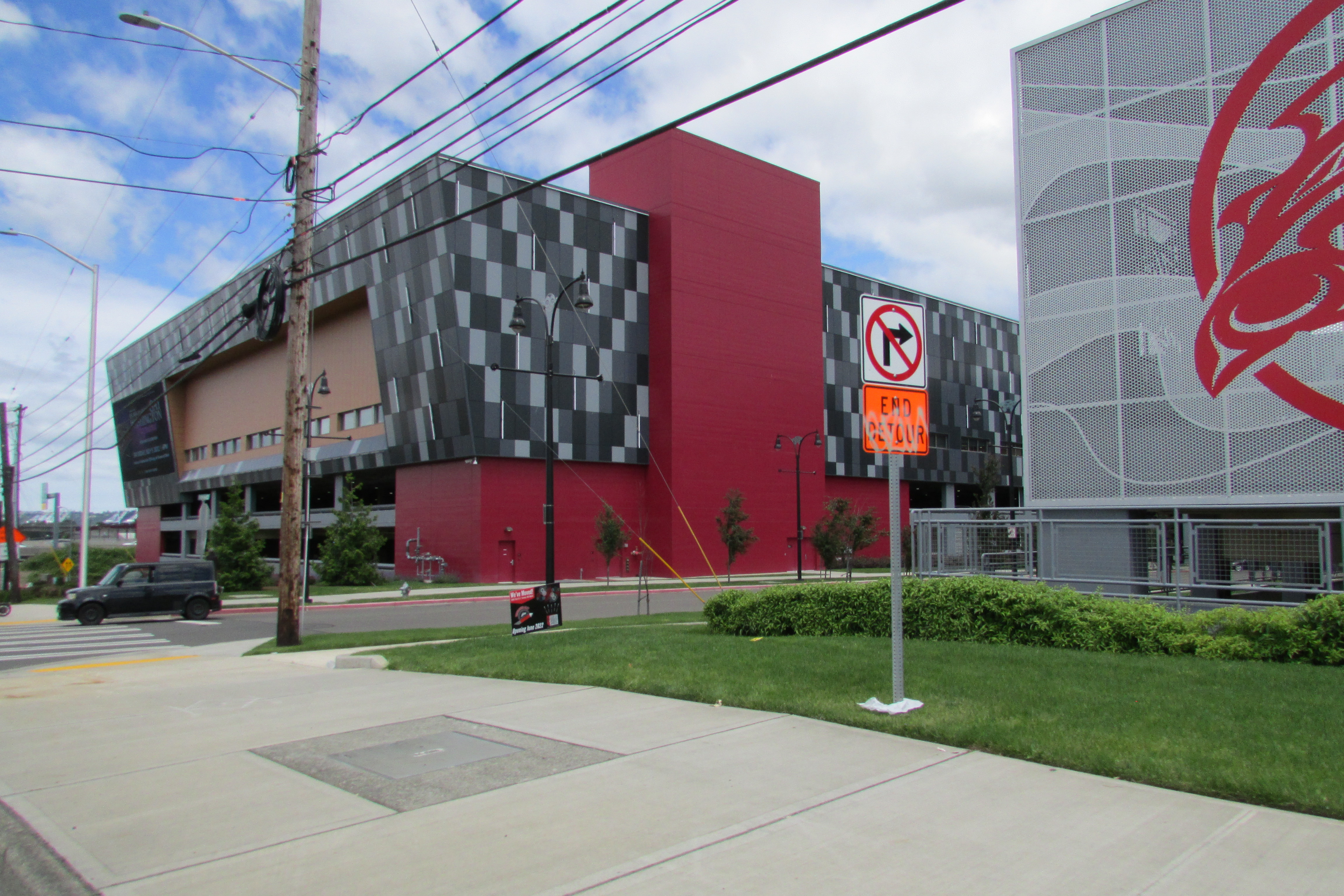
The Tacoma location of the Emerald Queen Casino, opened in 2020

Since the late 20th century, numerous states have used gambling, based on lotteries and other methods, as a source of revenue to support programs wanted by taxpayers. Changes in federal law and negotiations with such states have enabled federally recognized tribes on many reservations to establish bingo and other gambling facilities to generate revenue.

Searching for new revenues and employment for its people, the Puyallup opened the Emerald Queen Casino in 1996 on a paddlewheel riverboat, the Emerald Queen, which it berthed in the Port of Tacoma. The riverboat was acquired for $15 million and could accommodate 2,000 people. In 2004, as part of an agreement with the Port to accommodate further commercial development of the waterway, the tribe closed the operation on the boat and its shore-side property. The unused Emerald Queen riverboat remained docked in Tacoma until 2023, when it was sold to a barge operator based in Seattle.

The tribe has developed related gaming and entertainment facilities in two other locations, keeping the name Emerald Queen Casino for its overall operation. In the 21st century, a majority of the tribe's income is generated from the gambling casinos and related restaurant, retail and hotel facilities.

In total area, the casino is one of the largest casinos in Washington state. It has locations in both Tacoma and Fife. The Tacoma location, includes the casino, a restaurant and buffet and an entertainment venue hosting singers and comedians. The entertainment venue, in collaboration with Brian Halquist Productions, Inc., is host to the Battle at the Boat boxing series, which is the longest-running casino boxing series in the Pacific Northwest. A majority of the casino is located in a new 310,000 sq ft multi-level structure, which opened in June 2020; also includes a hotel and parking garage. The original I-5 location was intended as a temporary facility, and closed permanently in May 2020. It has continued to be used pending other development. The permanent structure of the old casino is located in the old Puyallup Bingo Hall. The I-5 location opened originally in 2001, and the tent addition was opened in 2004.

The Fife location includes a casino and a 140-room hotel. The tribe adapted a Best Western hotel for these purposes after purchasing the building in 2004. After renovation, the casino was opened in early 2005. The tribe undertook a major expansion in summer 2007, building two parking garages, a pool, a spa, new administrative towers, a ballroom, and a larger gaming area. The casino's restaurant, formerly named the Pacific Rim, was moved to the south tower and renamed the Tatoosh Grill. What is now the Pacific Rim Buffet is located on the ground floor of the tower.

A new building for the Tacoma location was opened on June 8, 2020, following a $400 million expansion project. The 310,000-square-foot (29,000 m^{2}) facility near I-5 has five restaurants and a 12-story, 170-room hotel. The project also includes an events center with capacity for 2,000 people.

=== Other ventures ===
The Puyallup Tribe has used its economic development branch, Marine View Ventures, to expand into operating several gas stations on the reservation. In the early 21st century, it was using gambling revenues to invest in a partnership for a large container facility at the Port of Tacoma. When completed, it will be the largest such facility in the Northwest and will connect the tribe to the shipping trade.

The Puyallup Tribe has also invested in the state's legal cannabis market. The tribe's first recreational cannabis store, Commencement Bay Cannabis, is located in Fife, adjacent to the casino itself.

Since 2021, the Puyallup Tribe has been a sponsor of Seattle Sounders FC, a Major League Soccer team; their logo appears on the team's jerseys. The tribe also collaborated with the Sounders to create a new jersey in 2025 that uses Southern Coast Salish weaving patterns and includes a Southern Lushootseed motto. FIFA, the international governing body of soccer, announced in 2023 that the Puyallup Tribe would serve as a local sponsor for the 2026 FIFA World Cup in Seattle. They are the first indigenous people to sponsor the World Cup.

== Reservation ==
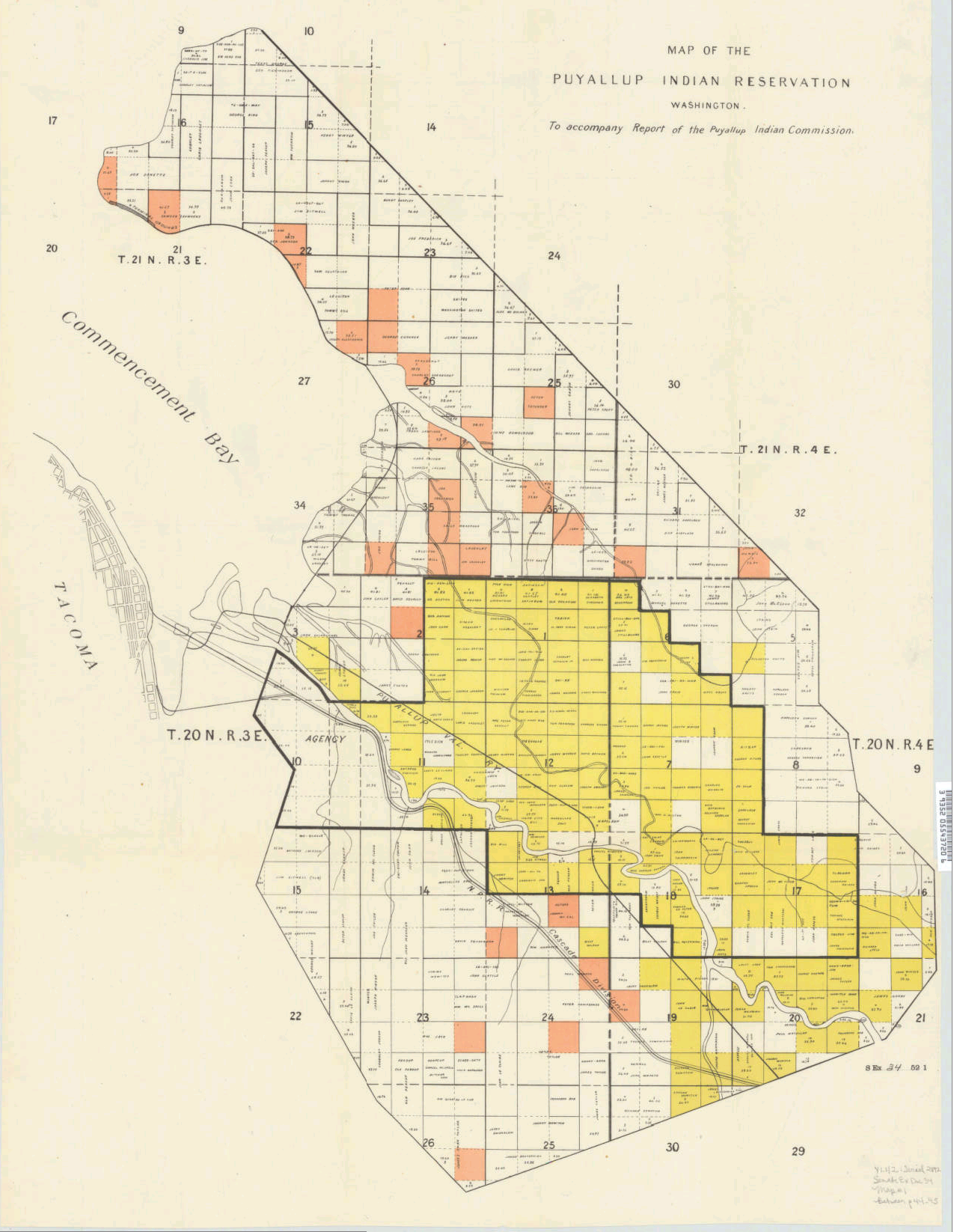
U.S. Government map of the reservation in 1892. The Puyallup River was later straightened along its lower course.

The Puyallup Indian Reservation is the reservation of the Puyallup Tribe, located in parts of Pierce and King counties of Washington state. The reservation, located at 47°14′38″N 122°22′15″W, is mostly located in Pierce County, although a small part is located in the city of Federal Way, which is in King County. The reservation has a land area of 73.935 km^{2} (28.547 sq mi) and has a population of 41,341, approximately 2,500 of which (3.2%) are Puyallup citizens. The majority of people living on the reservation are non-Indian, with 72 percent identifying only as Caucasian. Pierce County itself has a large Native American population of 32,000.

The largest city on the reservation is Tacoma, which covers a portion and has a population of 219,346 as of 2020. Other communities on the reservation include Waller, Fife, Milton, Edgewood, Puyallup, and Federal Way.

Due to land sales at a time when land was distributed to householders and other developments, neighboring jurisdictions have territory within the reservation. The city of Fife, Washington and the unincorporated community of Fife Heights, Washington lies entirely within the reservation as does much of the Port of Tacoma. The total population within the reservation is predominantly non-Native and not tribal members, according to the 2000 census.

From the mid-nineteenth century, European Americans began to enter the area in greater numbers. The United States wanted to enable development of lands and settlement by these people. Under the 1854 Treaty of Medicine Creek, the United States arranged with the Puyallup and several other tribes the cession of land to the U.S. and the removal of the Native population to reservations. Initially, the reservations were intended to be only occupied by Indians, and not settlers. While the tribe lost most of its historic territory, it retained rights for fishing, hunting and gathering on that land. The Puyallup and United States had such different conceptions of property that they did not fully understand each other's position.

In 1989–1990, the Port of Tacoma and the Puyallup Tribe reached a $163 million settlement, enabled by the Puyallup Tribe of Indians Settlement Act of 1989. It became one of the largest 20th century Indian land claims settlements.

== Language ==
The language of the Puyallup Tribe is Lushootseed, a Coast Salish language spoken by many different peoples in the Puget Sound region. Lushootseed is split into two major dialects, Northern and Southern Lushootseed. The Puyallup speak Southern Lushootseed, often also known as Twulshootseed (from txʷəlšucid, the Puyallup name for Lushootseed). Lushootseed was a historically oral language, and was only written in the modern era. The alphabet was created by Lushootseed-speaking elders working with linguist Thom Hess in the 1960s.

The language has declined in recent years, with the last fluent speaker, Vi Hilbert, dying in 2008. However, many tribes, including the Puyallup Tribe, are working to revitalize the language in daily use. The Puyallup Tribe has a strong language department, the Puyallup Language Program, which was created to revitalize Twulshootseed, emphasizing using the language for communication. The main objectives of the program are to create "language nests," physical locations where only Twulshootseed, not English, is spoken; to help individuals create their own language learning program, without needing to rely on one centralized language program, and to grow the Twulshootseed language in the school, the home, the workplace, and the community.

The Puyallup Language Program operates a website, Puyallup Tribal Language, where they offer free resources for learning the language, information about the language and their program, and classes for tribal members.

== Notable Puyallup citizens ==
- Ella Aquino (1902–1988), treaty rights advocate and prominent leader of the Native American community of Seattle
- Ramona Bennett, treaty rights advocate and former member of the Puyallup Tribal Council
- Herman Dillon (1931–2014), former chairman of the Puyallup Tribal Council
- Robert Satiacum (1929–1991), treaty rights advocate also convicted of embezzlement of tribal funds, attempted murder, and child molestation
- Robert Satiacum Jr., political and environmental activist and former Electoral College elector, faithless elector
