= Fife Public Schools =

School district in Washington, United States

Address
- 5802 20th St E Fife, Washington, 98424; United States

District information
- Grades: Preschool - 12
- Established: December 22, 1899; 126 years ago
- Superintendent: Kevin Alfano
- NCES District ID: 5302880

Students and staff
- Students: 3,799 (2020-2021)
- Student–teacher ratio: 18.33

Other information
- Website: www.fifeschools.com

Fife Public Schools is a school district comprising parts of the Washington state cities of Fife, Milton, Edgewood, Tacoma, Pacific as well as unincorporated census-designated places Lakeland South and Fife Heights. The district was established on December 22, 1899.

Fife Schools is a member of the Standard Bearer Network founded by the Schlechty Center which is a non-profit organization that helps schools and districts to transform by emphasizing student engagement. Fife has been a member of the Standard Bearer Network since 2000.

== Boundary ==
In Pierce County the district includes most of Fife, all of Fife Heights and the Pierce County portion of Milton, and portions of Edgewood and Tacoma.

In King County the district includes most of the King County portion of Milton, and portions of Lakeland South and Pacific.

== Governance ==
The Board of Directors for Fife Public Schools is an elected body of five school directors. Each director must reside and be a registered voter, at the time of their election or appointment, in the geographical region, known as a Director District, they represent on the board. The length of the term is four years. Board meetings are generally held once a month. Currently, board meetings are typically scheduled for the last Monday of the month at 6:00 p.m., with some exceptions, in the boardroom at Fife School District's Office at 1720 Oak St., Milton, WA.

School Board Members
Director	Director District	First Elected	Term End	Board Position
Iesha Kidd	1	2017	2019	
Chelsea Bjorkman	2	2017	2019	Vice-President
Jennifer Mayhew	3	2019	2021	President
Cheryl Reid-Simons	4	2017	2021	
Kimberly Yee	5	2017	2021	

== Schools ==
- Discovery Primary School (K-2)
- Fife Elementary School (K-5)
- Hedden Elementary School (3-5)
- Surprise Lake Middle School (6-7)
- Columbia Junior High (8-9)
- Fife High School (10-12)
