= Murder of James Sanders =

Murder case in Washington

On April 28, 2010, James Sanders was fatally shot in Edgewood, Washington, while showing a diamond ring that was listed for sale on Craigslist.

== Circumstances of death ==
Three men and a woman went to Sanders' house to inspect a diamond ring offered for sale on Craigslist. The suspects said by telephone that the ring was sought for a Mother's Day gift for a mother-in-law. The family was detained. When the suspects started to beat one of the children, the elder Sanders intervened and was fatally shot.

== Suspects and alleged crime spree ==
Based on tracing e-mailed information, four suspects were sought, Clabon Berniard, Joshua Reese, Kiyoshi Higashi, and Amanda Knight. Three were later apprehended near San Francisco, California (all except Bernaird) after they were found driving without a front license plate and a gun was found. Knight paid bail and was released before the suspects were linked with the crime. The suspects were featured on the America's Most Wanted television show. Knight later surrendered to police. Berniard also surrendered to police in Washington state. In court, they were charged with one count of first-degree murder, two counts of robbery, two counts of assault, and one count of burglary. The suspects wept in court and entered not guilty pleas. The Sanders ring was later retrieved at a San Francisco pawn shop.

The four suspects were thought to be involved with a robbery after answering another Craigslist advertisement. Knight was seen on video allegedly pawning items obtained during a Craigslist robbery in Lake Stevens, Washington.

== Aftermath ==
=== Family ===
The wife of Sanders gave several interviews to the news media. She said that she "forgave" the arrested suspects. Higashi's father attended the funeral and expressed regret as well as noting that his son will probably spend the rest of his life in prison.

=== Craigslist ===
Subsequent to the killing, Craigslist posted additional warnings to their website. Craigslist-related murders have received much publicity with the media warning of the dangers of contact after online encounters. Craigslist-associated killings have occurred in Boston and Minnesota.

=== Suspects and trial ===
The four suspects were held on $2 million bail.

In 2011, all four were convicted of numerous crimes, including first-degree murder, and received sentences of 71 to 124 years in prison.
