= Peter Francis Hylebos =

Biography of a prominent Catholic priest from the 1800s

Peter Francis Hylebos (December 29, 1848 – November 28, 1918) was a Catholic priest who established schools and hospitals in Tacoma, Washington, and advocated for Chinese immigrants during the Tacoma riot of 1885.

Born in 1848 and educated at the University of Louvain, Hylebos left Belgium in 1870 to begin his missionary work in the Pacific Northwest. He led the founding of several Catholic institutions in Tacoma, Washington, including St. Leo Church, St Joseph's Hospital, and St. George’s Indian School. He became a prominent figure in the area, with notable appearances including delivering an address at the groundbreaking ceremony of the Alaska-Yukon-Pacific Exposition.

During the Chinese expulsion of 1885, Hylebos spoke on behalf of Chinese immigrants and attempted to prevent loss of life and property. Hylebos's efforts were commemorated in the 2023 opera Tacoma Method created by Gregory Youtz and Zhang Er, which documents the riot.

Hylebos died of the Spanish flu in 1918 and is buried in Tacoma’s Calvary Cemetery. Hylebos Creek, a stream near Tacoma, is named after him.
