= Fife High School =

Coordinates: 47°14′17″N 122°21′11″W

Location
- 5616 20th Street East; Fife, Washington; United States

Information
- Type: Public secondary
- Motto: Get 'em Trojans
- Established: 1899
- School district: Fife Public Schools
- Dean: Shane Nixon
- Principal: Carroll, Paige
- Teaching staff: 40.78 (FTE)
- Grades: 10–12
- Enrollment: 864 (2023–2024)
- Student to teacher ratio: 21.19
- Colors: Blue & Gold
- Mascot: Trojans
- Website: fhs.fifeschools.com

Fife High School is located in Fife, Washington. FHS is the only high school in the Fife Public Schools system.

== History ==
Fife High School, founded on December 23, 1899, initially consisted of the upper grades of the general Fife School. In 1904, a secondary building was built in the same location. The high school was officially separated from the lower grades in 1930, upon completion of the new high school building. A two room-school was built on the site of the present high school. At that time, the official school colors of royal blue and gold were chosen.

=== STEAM center ===
Fife high school has the STEAM (Science, Technology, Engineering, Art, and Math) Center, which is a 31,000-square-foot building with at least 11 classrooms to improve facilities for art and science. The building was designed by McGranahan Architects and built by Pease Construction. The building was opened to students in early 2023.

== Traditions ==
=== Cabbage Patch ===
From the roots of Fife's agricultural economy, the Cabbage Patch Olympics were born in 1980. These field games were named in honor of the many cabbage fields, which, until the 2000s, were still very prominent in the landscape. The Olympics occur every September as an inter-class competition as the finale of the fall Associated Student Body (A.S.B.) Week. Held on the football field, the competition consists of numerous events, most notably: the cabbage throw, Hula Hoop pass, tug of war, and pyramid building. Each class (sophomore, junior, and senior) is awarded points for each event, tallied on large decorated posters. Points are also awarded for color unity (every class member wearing the class color), spirit, and mascot creativity. Traditionally, the class colors are sophomore: white, junior: gold/yellow, and senior: blue. Each year, a theme for the Olympics is chosen, Cartoon Characters for example, but the cabbage remains the overall emphasis each year. The only prizes for winning the Olympics are the substantial bragging rights until next year.

=== Daffodil Festival ===
Each year, Fife participates in the Pierce County Daffodil Festival, a regional tradition since 1933. Each year a competition is held in the fall within the school, for the title of Fife Daffodil princess. Once selected, the Fife Princess joins other area school representatives in competition for the title of Daffodil Festival Queen.

Every year, the Fife community builds a parade float, following the particular theme of the parade that year. All of the Fife princesses and the Fife Queen ride, accompanied by the high school band and dance team.

=== Shulapalooza Film Festival ===
The inception of the annual film festival dates back to the year 2004, when it was conceived in response to a teacher's battle with leukemia. A group of students got together and raised money to buy an iPod to help their teacher pass the time in the hospital. Over time, this evolved into a recurring cultural event, slated for the month of April, hosted within the Columbia Junior High's Performing Arts Center. The festival's entire proceeds are allocated to charitable contributions directed towards the Leukemia and Lymphoma Society.

== Athletics ==
Fife competes as a 2A school in the South Puget Sound League (SPSL). However, Fife previously competed In the 2A Nisqually League, as well as a 3A classified school in the Seamount League-Pierce County, Washington. Fife's rival in athletics is White River High School, in Buckley, Washington.

=== Fall ===
- Football
- Cross Country
- Cheerleading (women and men)
- Tennis (men)
- Golf
- Soccer (women)
- Swimming (women)
- Volleyball

=== Winter ===
- Wrestling (men and women)
- Basketball (women)
- Basketball (men)
- Cheerleading (women and men)
- Swimming (men)

=== Spring ===
- Baseball
- Softball
- Soccer (men)
- Tennis (women)
- Track

== The Arts ==
The offerings of the school include:

- Band/Wind Ensemble
- Concert Choir
- Chamber Choir
- Jazz Band
- Jazz Choir
- Drawing
- Pottery
- Drama
- Metalworking

At the high school, the drama program offers three classes: Beginning Acting, Advanced Drama, and Actor's Workshop. Performances take place twice a year, with a dramatic performance in the fall and a musical in the spring. The musical is in collaboration with the Columbia Junior High.

In the past, a magazine set up by the students, Mirror, including student poetry, art, and short stories, was sold around the school but has been discontinued.

== Notable alumni ==
- Mark Emmert (1952), Former President, NCAA. Former President, University of Washington. Former Chancellor, Louisiana State University, Baton Rouge, LA.
- Jake Wambold (1996–2000), founding member/guitarist of Aiden
- Victor Mansaray (2015), professional soccer player
- Evan West, Washington state underground Bare-knuckle boxing fighter
- Kaleb McGary (2019–present), Offensive tackle for the Atlanta Falcons.
- Ulumoo Ale (2024–present), Nose tackle for the Carolina Panthers.
- Cam Booser (2024–present), Pitcher for the Boston Red Sox
- Lorenzo Ramos (2015), Professional Soccer Player

== Notable faculty ==
- Jim Lambright, former University of Washington Head Football Coach
- Tony Crudo, former soccer player for the North American Soccer League
