= Kaleb McGary =

American football player (born 1995)

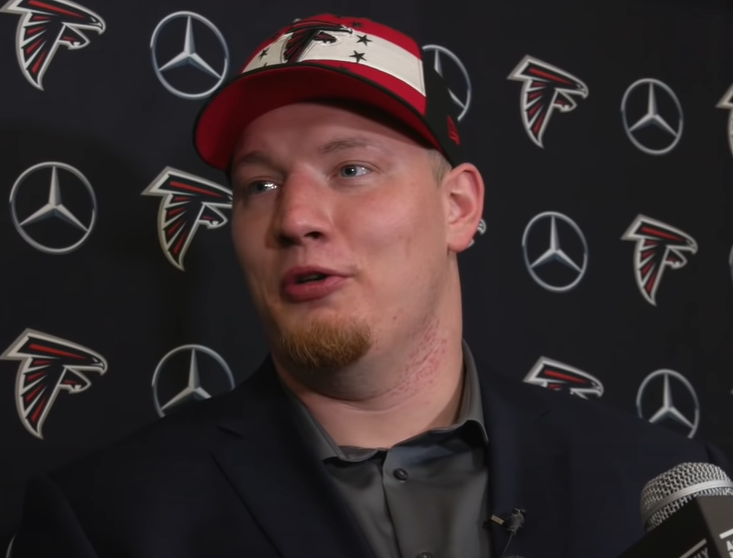
- McGary in 2019

No. 76
- Position: Offensive tackle

Personal information
- Born: February 22, 1995 (age 31); Battle Ground, Washington, U.S.
- Listed height: 6 ft 6 in (1.98 m)
- Listed weight: 330 lb (150 kg)

Career information
- High school: Fife (Fife, Washington)
- College: Washington (2014–2018)
- NFL draft: 2019: 1st round, 31st overall pick

Career history
- Atlanta Falcons (2019–2025)

Awards and highlights
- 2× First-team All-Pac-12 (2017, 2018); Morris Trophy (2018)

Career NFL statistics
- Games played: 93
- Games started: 92
- Stats at Pro Football Reference

Kaleb Ethan McGary (born February 22, 1995) is an American former professional football player who was an offensive tackle in the National Football League (NFL) for seven seasons, all for the Atlanta Falcons. He played college football for the Washington Huskies.

== Early life ==
McGary originally attended Battle Ground High School in Battle Ground, Washington as a freshman before transferring to Fife High School in Fife, Washington. He played offensive line, tight end and defensive line in high school. He committed to the University of Washington to play college football.

== College career ==
McGary played at Washington from 2014 to 2018. During his collegiate career, he started 47 of 53 games. As a senior, he won the Morris Trophy.

== Professional career ==
Pre-draft measurables
Height	Weight	Arm length	Hand span	Wingspan	40-yard dash	10-yard split	20-yard split	20-yard shuttle	Three-cone drill	Vertical jump	Broad jump	Bench press
6 ft 7 1/8 in (2.01 m)	317 lb (144 kg)	32 7/8 in (0.84 m)	10 1/8 in (0.26 m)	6 ft 7 3/4 in (2.03 m)	5.05 s	1.83 s	2.95 s	4.58 s	7.66 s	33.5 in (0.85 m)	9 ft 3 in (2.82 m)	23 reps
All values from NFL Combine

McGary was selected by the Atlanta Falcons with the 31st overall pick in the first round of the 2019 NFL draft. The Falcons traded up from the second round with the Los Angeles Rams to acquire the selection used to draft McGary. After splitting reps with Ty Sambrailo at right tackle in Week 1 against the Minnesota Vikings, McGary was named the Falcons starting right tackle. As a rookie, he started all 16 games for the Falcons in the 2019 season.

McGary started 13 of 16 games in 2020 for the Falcons. He was injured in week 2 against Dallas and left the game. He would sit out the next game but return to the starting lineup in Week 4 versus the Green Bay Packers. McGary was unavailable for Atlanta's Week 14 loss to the Los Angeles Chargers, and had missed five consecutive practices while attending to a family matter.

On May 2, 2022, the Falcons declined to pick up the fifth year option on McGary's contract, making him a free agent after the season.

On March 31, 2023, McGary signed a three-year, $34.5 million contract extension with the Falcons.

On August 4, 2025, McGary signed a two-year, $30 million extension with the Falcons. On August 26, McGary was placed on season-ending injured reserve due to a "significant" knee injury.

On April 8, 2026, McGary announced his retirement from professional football.
