= Ty Sambrailo =

American football player (born 1992)

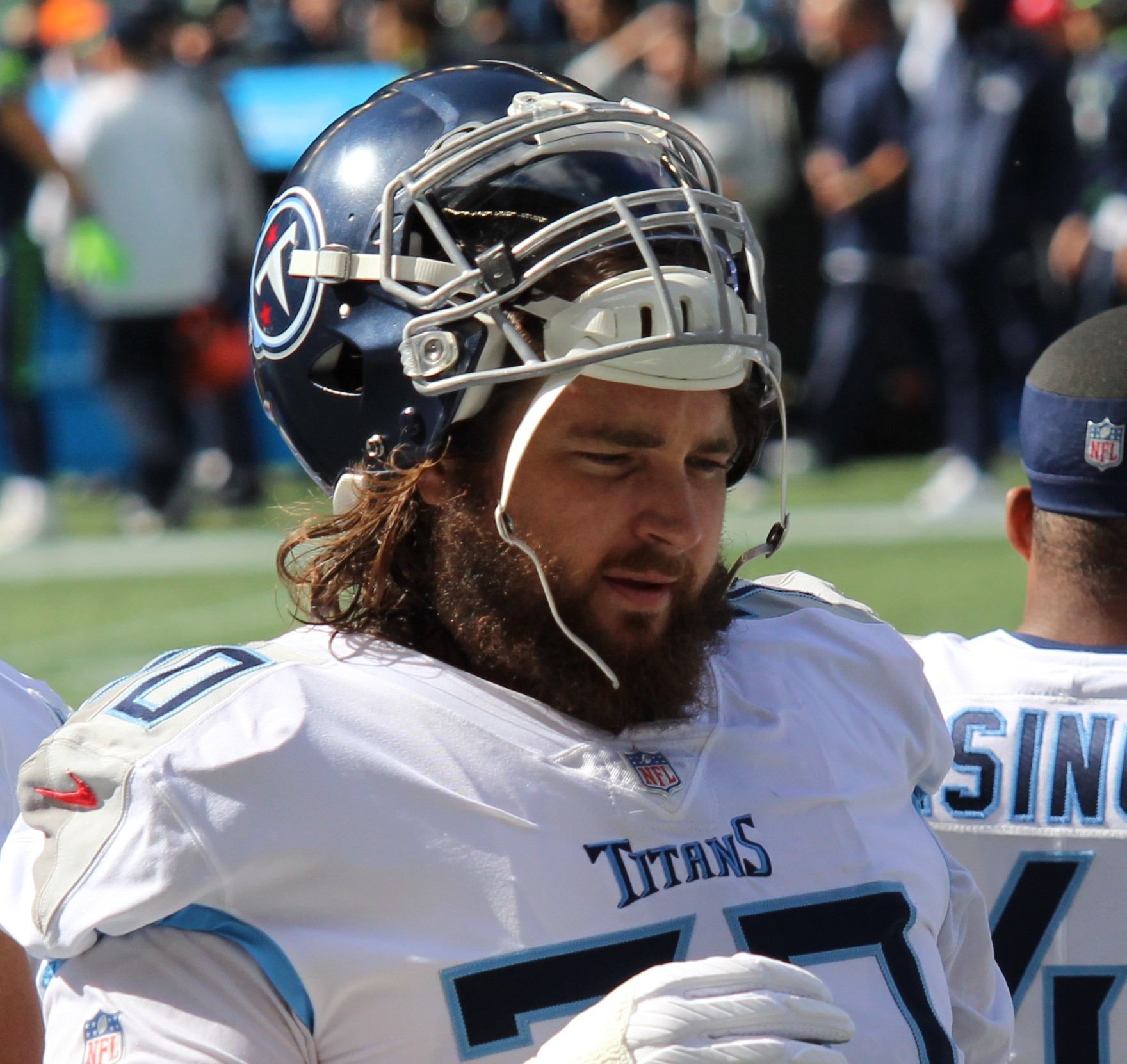
- Sambrailo with the Tennessee Titans in 2021

No. 74, 70
- Position: Offensive tackle

Personal information
- Born: March 10, 1992 (age 34); Watsonville, California, U.S.
- Listed height: 6 ft 5 in (1.96 m)
- Listed weight: 311 lb (141 kg)

Career information
- High school: St. Francis (Watsonville)
- College: Colorado State
- NFL draft: 2015: 2nd round, 59th overall pick

Career history
- Denver Broncos (2015–2016); Atlanta Falcons (2017–2019); Tennessee Titans (2020–2021)

Awards and highlights
- Super Bowl champion (50); First-team All-MWC (2014)

Career NFL statistics
- Games played: 71
- Games started: 19
- Stats at Pro Football Reference

Tyler William Sambrailo (/sæmˈbraɪloʊ/ sam-BRY-loh; born March 10, 1992) is an American former professional football player who was a tackle in the National Football League (NFL). He played college football for the Colorado State Rams. He was selected by the Denver Broncos in the second round of the 2015 NFL draft, where he was a member of the Super Bowl 50 championship team after they beat the Carolina Panthers by a score of 24–10. He was also a member of the Atlanta Falcons and Tennessee Titans.

== Early life ==
A native of Watsonville, California, Sambrailo attended Saint Francis Central Coast Catholic High School, where he was a two-way lineman and three-year team captain. Sambrailo was a first-team all-state selection as a senior and was named the Santa Cruz Coast Athletic League Offensive and Defensive Lineman of the Year. The St. Francis Sharks advanced to the CIF Central Coast Section CCS Division III playoffs in both the 2008 and 2009 seasons.

Regarded as the only two-star recruit by Rivals.com, Sambrailo was not ranked among the top offensive linemen of his class, which was highlighted by Seantrel Henderson, Luke Joeckel, and Jake Matthews. Sambrailo drew limited recruiting interest and eventually chose Colorado State over scholarship offers from Sacramento State, Southern Utah, and Weber State.

== College career ==
Sambrailo was the lone junior on a solid offensive line that helped contribute to the Colorado State Rams reaching the 2013 New Mexico Bowl.

== Professional career ==
Pre-draft measurables
Height	Weight	Arm length	Hand span	40-yard dash	10-yard split	20-yard split	20-yard shuttle	Three-cone drill	Vertical jump	Broad jump	Bench press
6 ft 5 7/8 in (1.98 m)	311 lb (141 kg)	33 in (0.84 m)	10 in (0.25 m)	5.36 s	1.85 s	3.10 s	4.58 s	7.37 s	29.0 in (0.74 m)	8 ft 1 in (2.46 m)	23 reps

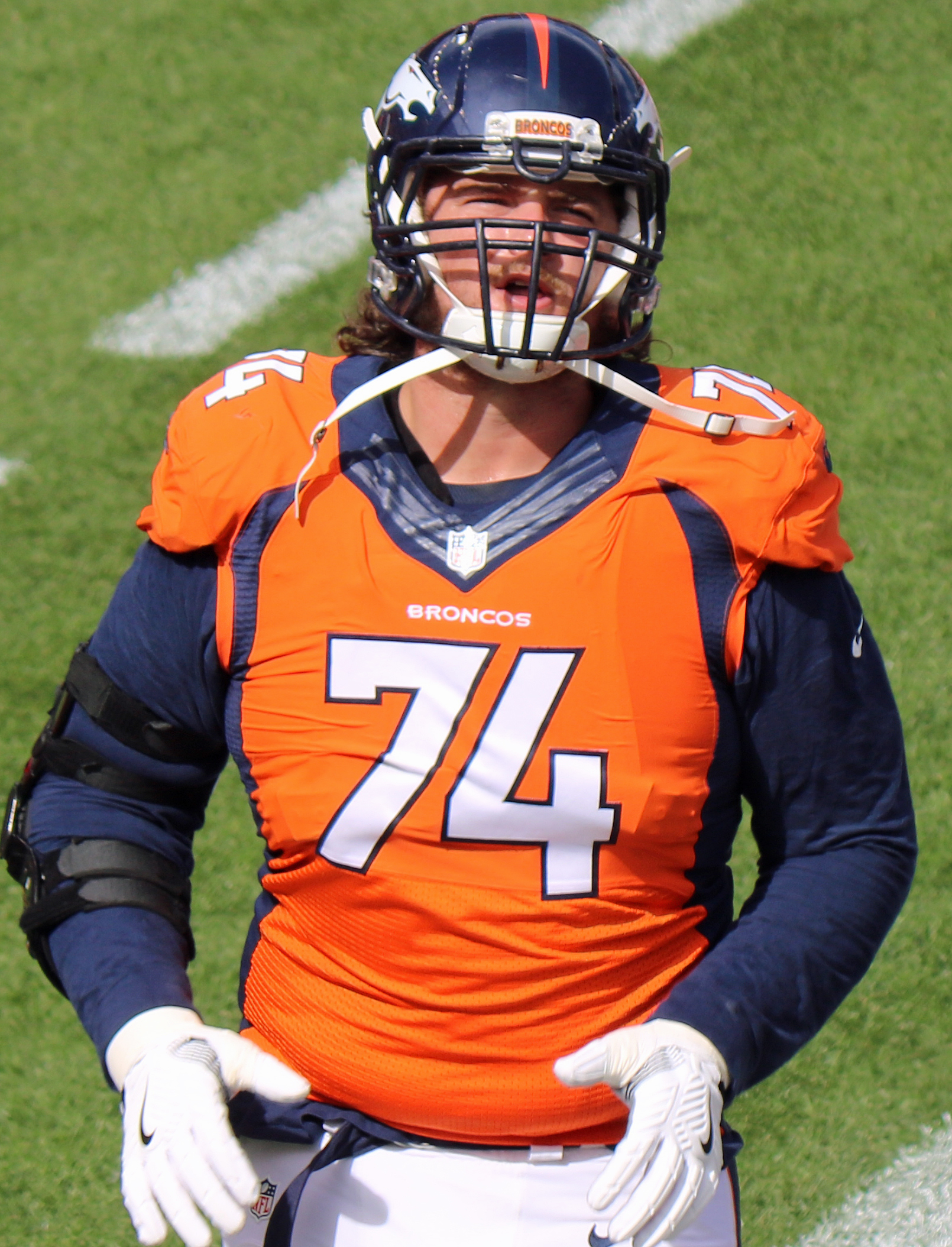
Sambrailo with the Denver Broncos in 2016

=== Denver Broncos ===
Sambrailo was selected by the Denver Broncos in the second round, 59th overall, in the 2015 NFL draft. He opened the first three games of the season at left tackle before being placed on injured reserve with a shoulder injury on November 2, 2015. On February 7, 2016, Sambrailo was part of the Broncos team that won Super Bowl 50. In the game, the Broncos defeated the Carolina Panthers by a score of 24–10.

=== Atlanta Falcons ===
On September 1, 2017, Sambrailo was traded to the Atlanta Falcons in exchange for a 2018 fifth round draft pick. He played in 15 games for the Falcons in 2017, starting two at right tackle in place of the injured Ryan Schraeder.

In 2018, Sambrailo played in all 16 games, starting three at right tackle and one at left guard.

On February 19, 2019, Sambrailo signed a three-year contract extension with the Falcons. After splitting reps with rookie Kaleb McGary at right tackle in Week 1, Sambrailo was named a backup tackle. On December 29, Sambrailo caught his first career touchdown from Matt Ryan against the Tampa Bay Buccaneers.

The Falcons released Sambrailo on March 16, 2020.

=== Tennessee Titans ===
On March 25, 2020, Sambrailo signed with the Tennessee Titans. After entering the season as the Titans' swing tackle, he was named the starting left tackle in Week 7 after an injury to Taylor Lewan. Sambrailo was placed on injured reserve on November 24.

Sambrailo re-signed with the Titans on March 22, 2021. He made four appearances (one start) for Tennessee. On October 12, Sambrailo announced his retirement from professional football.
