= Herman Dillon =

Puyallup Nation politician

Herman Dillon, Sr. (June 15, 1931 – May 23, 2014) was a Native American leader of the Puyallup Nation.

Dillon served in the United States Naval Reserve and then in the United States Army during the Korean War. In 1971, Dillon was elected to the Puyallup Nation tribal council and served as chairman. He helped negotiated compacts with the state of Washington on gambling and to protect hunting and fishing rights.
