= Edgewood, Washington =

- City
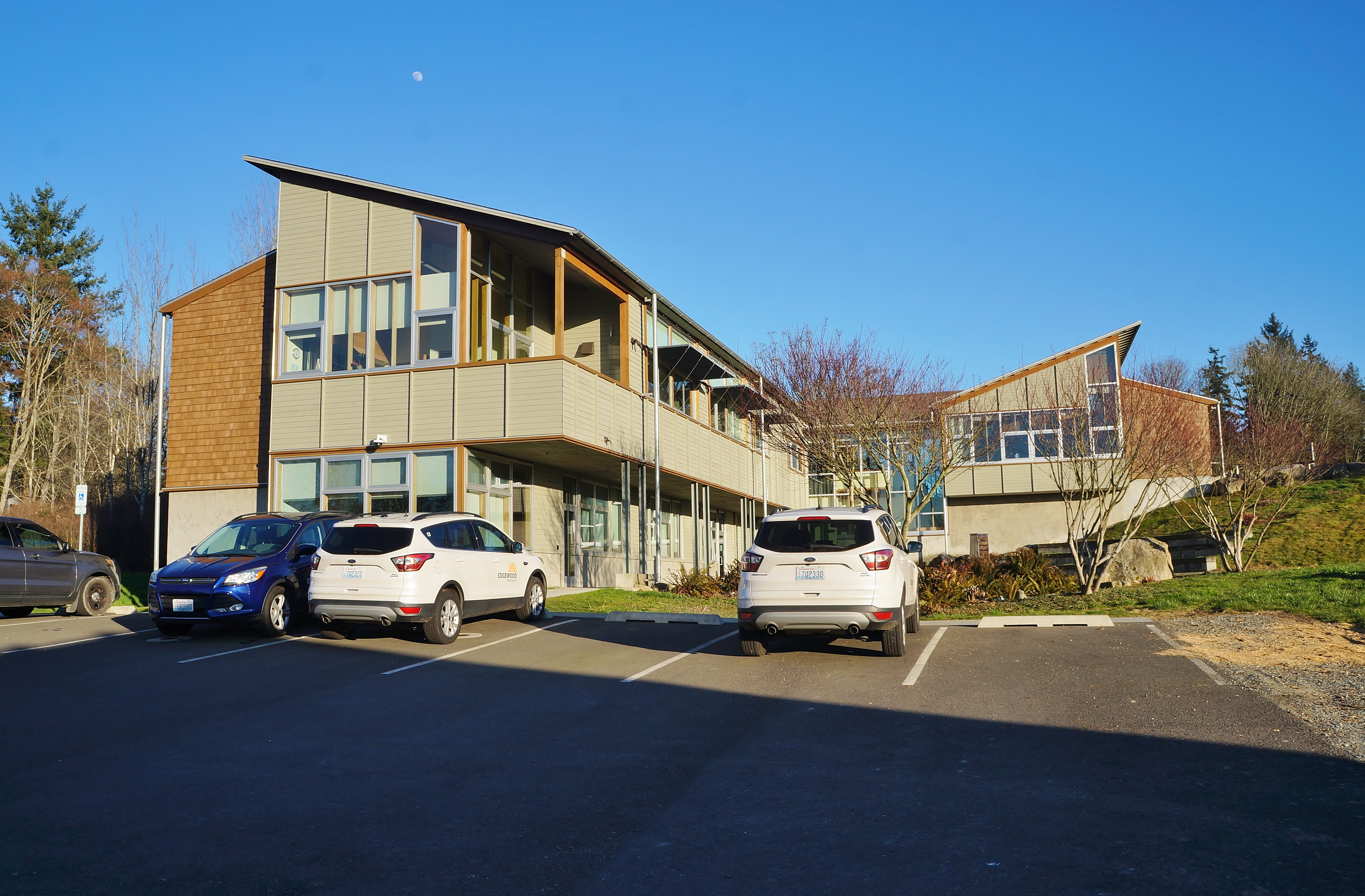
- City hall

- Location of Edgewood, Washington
- Coordinates: 47°13′55″N 122°16′32″W
- Country: United States
- State: Washington
- County: Pierce

Government
  - Type: Mayor–council
  - Mayor: Dave Olson

Area
  - Total: 8.39 sq mi (21.74 km^{2})
  - Land: 8.39 sq mi (21.72 km^{2})
  - Water: 0.0077 sq mi (0.02 km^{2})
- Elevation: 387 ft (118 m)

Population (2020)
  - Total: 12,327
  - Density: 1,556.7/sq mi (601.06/km^{2})
- Time zone: UTC-8 (Pacific (PST))
  - Summer (DST): UTC-7 (PDT)
- ZIP codes: 98371, 98372, 98390
- Area code: 253
- FIPS code: 53-20645
- GNIS feature ID: 2410400
- Website: www.edgewoodwa.gov

Edgewood is a city in Pierce County, Washington, United States. The population was 12,327 at the 2020 census. Neighboring towns include Fife to the west, Milton to the northwest, Federal Way to the north, Sumner to the east, and Puyallup to the south.

== History ==
The history of Edgewood can be traced to the Puyallup Indian tribe that lived along the Puyallup River. Dr. William Tolmie, a Scotsman working for the Hudson's Bay Company, passed through Edgewood in 1833 soon after becoming Chief Trader at Fort Nisqually. Tolmie had arrived at Fort Vancouver by ship from Britain in May 1833. Trappers with Native American wives had moved to the area in the 1830s and settlers in the 1850s.

Washington's first telegraph line paralleled Military Road that ran through the heart of Edgewood. Approximately 420 Americans (apart from Indians) resided in what is now Pierce County in 1858. By 1862, 681 non-Native Americans were reported to be residents of Pierce County. Evidence indicates that the first building on the North Hill (Surprise Lake) was a one-room log building formed as School District 27 in 1891. One of the first known residents in Edgewood was Peter Nyholm in 1895.

The first official run of the interurban line from Tacoma to Seattle, by the way of the valley, was in October 1902. The State Spiritualists, who had six churches in Western Washington, had a summer camp at Edgewood that was purchased in 1903. Construction of a campground hotel began in 1927, and before completion a fire destroyed it in 1948.

Edgewood was officially incorporated on February 28, 1996.

On April 28, 2010, Edgewood was the site of the murder of James Sanders.

== Geography ==
The Edgewood and Milton areas are also known informally as North Hill. This contrasts with the South Hill area on the opposite side of the Puyallup River valley.

According to the United States Census Bureau, the city has a total area of 8.42 square miles (21.81 km^{2}), of which, 8.41 square miles (21.78 km^{2}) is land and 0.01 square miles (0.03 km^{2}) is water.

== Demographics ==
Historical population
Census	Pop.	Note	%±
1990	8,677		—
2000	9,089		4.7%
2010	9,387		3.3%
2020	12,327		31.3%
U.S. Decennial Census; 2020 Census

=== 2020 census ===
As of the 2020 census, Edgewood had a population of 12,327. The median age was 40.6 years. 21.1% of residents were under the age of 18 and 17.0% of residents were 65 years of age or older. For every 100 females there were 99.9 males, and for every 100 females age 18 and over there were 98.1 males age 18 and over.

100.0% of residents lived in urban areas, while 0.0% lived in rural areas.

There were 4,668 households in Edgewood, of which 32.0% had children under the age of 18 living in them. Of all households, 60.1% were married-couple households, 15.2% were households with a male householder and no spouse or partner present, and 17.6% were households with a female householder and no spouse or partner present. About 19.7% of all households were made up of individuals and 7.9% had someone living alone who was 65 years of age or older.

There were 5,125 housing units, of which 8.9% were vacant. The homeowner vacancy rate was 1.0% and the rental vacancy rate was 18.0%.

Racial composition as of the 2020 census
Race	Number	Percent
White	9,396	76.2%
Black or African American	306	2.5%
American Indian and Alaska Native	91	0.7%
Asian	807	6.5%
Native Hawaiian and Other Pacific Islander	91	0.7%
Some other race	334	2.7%
Two or more races	1,302	10.6%
Hispanic or Latino (of any race)	933	7.6%

=== 2010 census ===
As of the 2010 census, there were 9,387 people, 3,609 households, and 2,697 families living in the city. The population density was 1,116.2 inhabitants per square mile (431.0/km^{2}). There were 3,801 housing units at an average density of 452.0 per square mile (174.5/km^{2}). The racial makeup of the city was 90.4% White, 1.0% African American, 0.9% Native American, 2.5% Asian, 0.3% Pacific Islander, 1.4% from other races, and 3.4% from two or more races. Hispanic or Latino of any race were 4.4% of the population.

There were 3,609 households, of which 31.2% had children under the age of 18 living with them, 61.2% were married couples living together, 8.9% had a female householder with no husband present, 4.6% had a male householder with no wife present, and 25.3% were non-families. 18.8% of all households were made up of individuals, and 7% had someone living alone who was 65 years of age or older. The average household size was 2.59 and the average family size was 2.93.

The median age in the city was 44.3 years. 21.6% of residents were under the age of 18; 7.6% were between the ages of 18 and 24; 21.8% were from 25 to 44; 34.9% were from 45 to 64; and 14% were 65 years of age or older. The gender makeup of the city was 49.9% male and 50.1% female.

=== 2000 census ===
As of the 2000 census, there were 9,089 people, 3,421 households, and 2,637 families living in the city. The population density was 1,067.6 people per square mile (412.4/km^{2}). There were 3,562 housing units at an average density of 418.4 per square mile (161.6/km^{2}). The racial makeup of the city was 92.75% White, 0.62% African American, 0.91% Native American, 2.24% Asian, 0.24% Pacific Islander, 0.67% from other races, and 2.56% from two or more races. Hispanic or Latino of any race were 2.37% of the population.

In the city, the population was spread out, with 25.8% under the age of 18, 6.6% from 18 to 24, 27.8% from 25 to 44, 29.5% from 45 to 64, and 10.3% who were 65 years of age or older. The median age was 39 years. For every 100 females, there were 101.6 males. For every 100 females age 18 and over, there were 99.6 males.

The median income for a household in the city was $56,658, and the median income for a family was $74,518. The per capita income for the city was $24,797. About 3.5% of families and 4.2% of the population were below the poverty line.

== Education ==
Most areas in Edgewood are within the boundaries of the Puyallup School District. Some portions of Edgewood are in the Fife Public Schools district or the Sumner School District.

There are 4 schools located in Edgewood: Alice V. Hedden Elementary which is part of the Fife School District, Northwood Elementary and Mountain View Elementary which are part of the Puyallup School District, and Edgemont Junior High, which is part of the Puyallup school district as well.

== Historic landmarks ==
The Nyholm Windmill is a historic windmill now located at 2284 Meridian Avenue East in Edgewood. The site where the windmill originally resided was a farm at the intersection of Jovita Boulevard and Meridian Avenue East (SR-161). The Nyholm farm produced hay, vegetables, fruit and dairy products. The windmill was moved to its current location in 1980 through the efforts of the Edgewood Volunteer Fire Department. It has been adopted as the official symbol of Edgewood.
