= Fife, Washington =

Fife, Washington stəx̌ugʷiɬ
- City
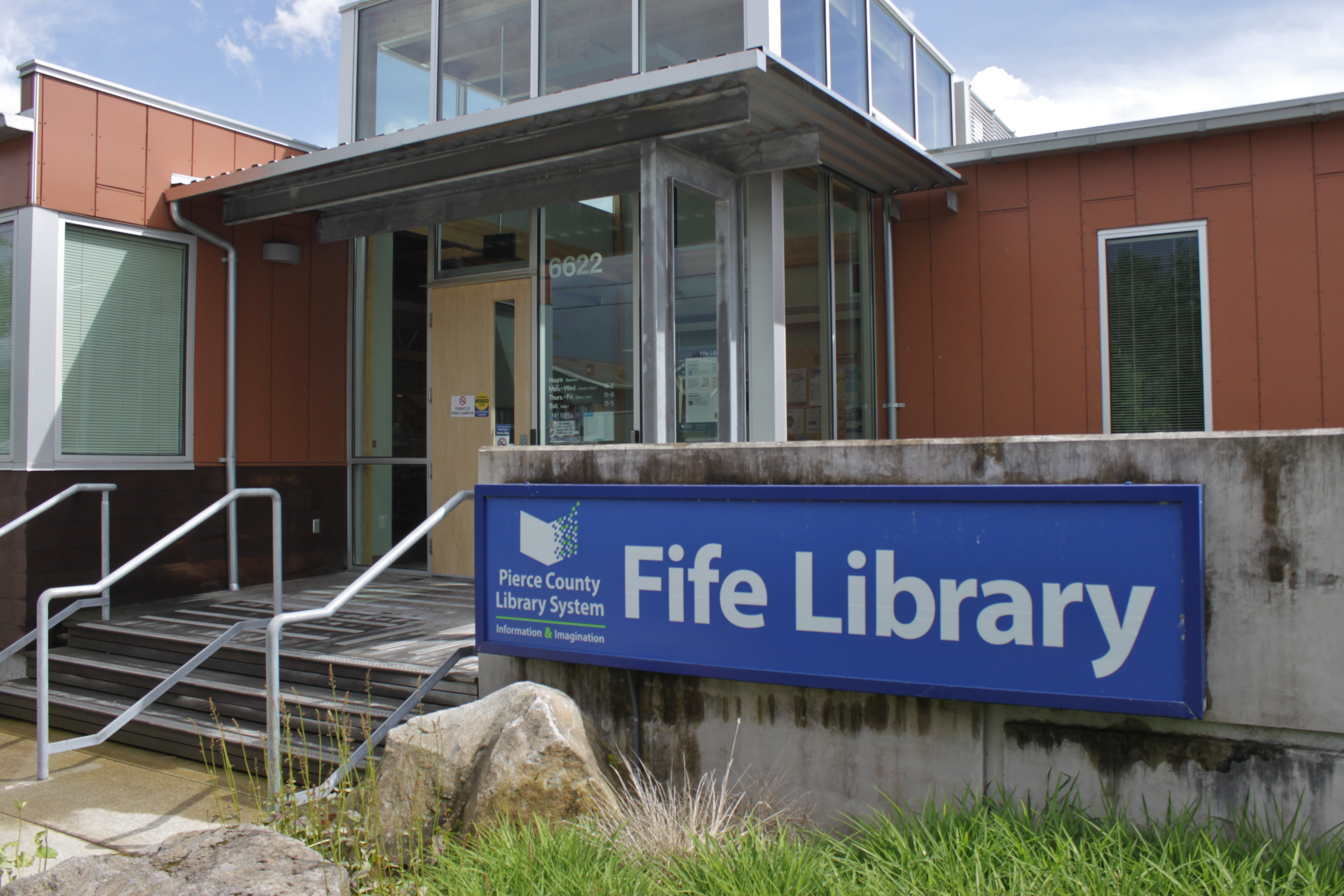
- Fife branch of the Pierce County Library system

- Location of Fife, Washington
- Coordinates: 47°14′22″N 122°21′55″W
- Country: United States
- State: Washington
- County: Pierce
- Founded: 1899
- Incorporated: February 11, 1957
- Named for: William J. Fife

Government
  - Type: Council–manager
  - Mayor: Kim Roscoe

Area
  - Total: 5.97 sq mi (15.45 km^{2})
  - Land: 5.83 sq mi (15.11 km^{2})
  - Water: 0.13 sq mi (0.34 km^{2})
- Elevation: 20 ft (6.1 m)

Population (2020)
  - Total: 10,999
  - Estimate (2023): 10,723
  - Density: 1,838.1/sq mi (709.69/km^{2})
- Time zone: UTC–8 (Pacific (PST))
  - Summer (DST): UTC–7 (PDT)
- ZIP Code: 98424
- Area code: 253
- FIPS code: 53-23795
- GNIS feature ID: 2410502
- Website: fifewa.gov

Fife (Lushootseed: stəx̌ugʷiɬ) is a city in Pierce County, Washington, United States and a suburb of Tacoma. The population was 10,999 at the 2020 census. Fife is contained within the Puyallup Indian Reservation and bisected by Interstate 5. It is east of Tacoma and south of the Port of Tacoma.

== History ==
The lower Puyallup basin is the ancestral home of the Puyallup people, who were relocated after the signing of the Medicine Creek Treaty in 1854. The treaty ceded Puyallup lands and created the Puyallup Indian Reservation, which was expanded to include modern-day Fife. The land on which the city sits was lost after the signing of the General Allotment Act in 1887 and other land transfers that were later resolved in a 1990 claims settlement.

The first white settlers arrived in the late 1890s. Fife may have been named for William J. Fife, a prominent Tacoma lawyer, Yukon prospector, once head of the Washington National Guard, and a lieutenant colonel in the field during the Philippine–American War. There is also a historic county of Scotland and former Pictish kingdom called Fife, which could also be a source of the city's name.

In 1940, Fife was described as "at a valley crossroads in the midst of a thickly settled berry growing and truck-gardening district is represented by a string of markets, taverns, shops, and a large, balloon-roofed dance hall along the highway." The 1940 population was 135. It had a large Japanese American population until Executive Order 9066 forced residents into internment camps.

Fife was officially incorporated on February 11, 1957, with approximately 850 residents. The city had been created to prevent the annexation of its business district by Tacoma and to give the area a distinct identity. Joe Vraves was elected as Fife's first mayor and served in that position until becoming a Pierce County councilmember in 1981. The Pacific Highway (U.S. Route 99) was replaced by Interstate 5 (I-5), which opened through Fife on October 10, 1962. The freeway's opening led to new commercial development in Fife, including those catering towards motorists, that brought high sales tax revenue to the city.

== Economy ==
Fife, an eastern suburb of Tacoma, consists primarily of businesses such as car dealerships, warehousing and industrial facilities, motels, drive through smoke shops, quick-dining restaurants as well as a Native American casino and various other highway-side businesses. Its proximity to the Port of Tacoma, Interstate 5, and Highway 167 has contributed to the large number of freight forwarding companies. Fife's tax base is made up of sales tax, utility tax, and property tax. Fife Heights, located on a hill beyond the incorporated bounds of the city, is a primarily residential area. Milton is located immediately to the east and Edgewood to the southeast.

== Geography ==
Fife is entirely within the Puyallup Indian Reservation created in 1854, but title is held almost entirely by non-Native Americans. According to the United States Census Bureau, the city has a total area of 5.964 square miles (15.45 km^{2}), of which 5.834 square miles (15.11 km^{2}) is land and 0.130 square miles (0.34 km^{2}) is water.

Fife is also a tideflat community, residing in the low, flat area extending from the Port of Tacoma. This means the water table occurs only 10–15 feet (3.0–4.6 m) below ground in some parts. Consequently, during the day, as the tide rises and falls in the Puget Sound, so do parts of land slightly rise and fall. The southern portions of the city are in the floodplain of the Puyallup River. Much of the city would be damaged or destroyed in the event of a lahar due to an eruption of Mount Rainier.

== Demographics ==
Historical population
Census	Pop.	Note	%±
1960	1,463		—
1970	1,458		−0.3%
1980	1,823		25.0%
1990	3,864		112.0%
2000	4,784		23.8%
2010	9,173		91.7%
2020	10,999		19.9%
2023 (est.)	10,723		−2.5%
U.S. Decennial Census; 2020 Census

As of the 2022 American Community Survey, there are 4,011 estimated households in Fife with an average of 2.70 persons per household. The city has a median household income of $84,538 and the per capita income was $36,226. Approximately 11.7% of the city's population lives at or below the poverty line. Fife has an estimated 73.4% employment rate, with 25.6% of the population holding a bachelor's degree or higher and 88.2% holding a high school diploma.

The top five reported ancestries (people were allowed to report up to two ancestries, thus the figures will generally add to more than 100%) were English (69.0%), Spanish (11.2%), Indo-European (5.4%), Asian and Pacific Islander (12.8%), and Other (1.6%).

=== Racial and ethnic composition ===
Fife, Washington – racial and ethnic composition Note: the US Census treats Hispanic/Latino as an ethnic category. This table excludes Latinos from the racial categories and assigns them to a separate category. Hispanics/Latinos may be of any race.
Race / ethnicity (NH = non-Hispanic)	Pop. 2000	Pop. 2010	Pop. 2020	% 2000	% 2010	% 2020
White alone (NH)	3,049	4,406	4,341	63.73%	48.03%	39.47%
Black or African American alone (NH)	312	726	1,106	6.52%	7.91%	10.06%
Native American or Alaska Native alone (NH)	182	221	236	3.80%	2.41%	2.15%
Asian alone (NH)	302	1,400	1,707	6.31%	15.26%	15.52%
Pacific Islander alone (NH)	58	248	852	1.21%	2.70%	7.75%
Other race alone (NH)	7	15	55	0.15%	0.16%	0.50%
Mixed race or multiracial (NH)	226	562	1,025	4.72%	6.13%	9.32%
Hispanic or Latino (any race)	648	1,595	1,677	13.55%	17.39%	15.25%
Total	4,784	9,173	10,999	100.00%	100.00%	100.00%

=== 2020 census ===
As of the 2020 census, there were 10,999 people, 4,130 households, and 2,572 families residing in the city, and the median age was 32.5 years.

26.3% of residents were under the age of 18 and 7.4% of residents were 65 years of age or older.

For every 100 females there were 97.6 males, and for every 100 females age 18 and over there were 95.9 males.

Of the 4,130 households in Fife, 38.0% had children under the age of 18 living in them. Of all households, 40.9% were married-couple households, 21.4% were households with a male householder and no spouse or partner present, and 27.1% were households with a female householder and no spouse or partner present. About 27.4% of all households were made up of individuals and 5.8% had someone living alone who was 65 years of age or older.

The population density was 1,910.2 inhabitants per square mile (737.5/km^{2}). There were 4,326 housing units at an average density of 751.3 per square mile (290.1/km^{2}).

Of the 4,326 housing units, 4.5% were vacant. The homeowner vacancy rate was 1.1% and the rental vacancy rate was 4.3%.

100.0% of residents lived in urban areas, while 0.0% lived in rural areas.

=== 2010 census ===
As of the 2010 census, there were 9,173 people, 3,642 households, and 2,192 families living in the city. The population density was 1,613.6 inhabitants per square mile (623.0/km^{2}). There were 3,895 housing units at an average density of 684.5 per square mile (264.3/km^{2}). The racial makeup of the city was 55.17% White, 8.17% African American, 3.00% Native American, 15.53% Asian, 2.75% Pacific Islander, 7.62% from some other races and 7.76% from two or more races. Hispanic or Latino people of any race were 17.39% of the population.

Of the 3,642 households 35.4% had children under the age of 18 living with them, 39.8% were married couples living together, 13.7% had a female householder with no husband present, 6.6% had a male householder with no wife present, and 39.8% were non-families. 29.7% of households were one person and 4.2% were one person aged 65 or older. The average household size was 2.50 and the average family size was 3.12.

The median age was 30.9 years. 25.7% of residents were under the age of 18; 10.5% were between the ages of 18 and 24; 36.9% were from 25 to 44; 20.4% were from 45 to 64; and 6.5% were 65 or older. The gender makeup of the city was 50.4% male and 49.6% female.

=== 2000 census ===
As of the 2000 census, there were 4,784 people, 2,111 households, and 1,123 families living in the city. The population density was 859.7 inhabitants per square mile (331.9/km^{2}). There were 2,232 housing units at an average density of 401.1 per square mile (154.9/km^{2}). The racial makeup of the city was 68.62% White, 6.81% African American, 4.14% Native American, 6.50% Asian, 1.23% Pacific Islander, 6.94% from some other races and 5.75% from two or more races. Hispanic or Latino people of any race were 13.55% of the population.

Of the 2,111 households 30.4% had children under the age of 18 living with them, 32.4% were married couples living together, 14.4% had a female householder with no husband present, and 46.8% were non-families. 37.5% of households were one person and 6.6% were one person aged 65 or older. The average household size was 2.24 and the average family size was 3.00.

The age distribution was 25.8% under the age of 18, 14.4% from 18 to 24, 34.9% from 25 to 44, 17.3% from 45 to 64, and 7.5% 65 or older. The median age was 29 years. For every 100 females, there were 106.7 males. For every 100 females age 18 and over, there were 106.3 males.

The median household income was $31,806 and the median family income was $36,250. Males had a median income of $30,963 versus $25,101 for females. The per capita income for the city was $16,723. About 12.6% of families and 14.9% of the population were below the poverty line, including 19.8% of those under age 18 and 7.9% of those age 65 or over.

== Crime ==
Fife
- Crime rates* (2023)

Violent crimes
- Homicide: 7
- Rape: 48
- Robbery: 254
- Aggravated assault: 440
- Total violent crime: 749

Property crimes
- Burglary: 585
- Larceny-theft: 2,716
- Motor vehicle theft: 1,580
- Arson: 48
- Total property crime: 4,929
- Note: Reported crimes per 100,000 population Source: 2023 FBI UCR Data

According to the Uniform Crime Report statistics compiled by the Federal Bureau of Investigation (FBI) in 2023, there were 749 violent crimes and 4,929 property crimes per 100,000 residents. Of these, the violent crimes consisted of 7 murders, 48 forcible rapes, 254 robberies and 440 aggravated assaults, while 585 burglaries, 2,716 larceny-thefts, 1,580 motor vehicle thefts and 48 acts of arson defined the property offenses.

== Education ==
The majority of the city limits is in the Fife Public Schools district, which also includes Milton and parts of Edgewood. The district has one high school, Fife High School.

Other parts of Fife are in the Puyallup School District.

== Notable people ==
- Dr. Mark Emmert, former president of the University of Washington and president of the National Collegiate Athletic Association
- Frank Herbert, author known for the Dune series
- Kaleb McGary, American football offensive tackle for the Atlanta Falcons
