= Milton, Washington =

City in Washington, United States

- City
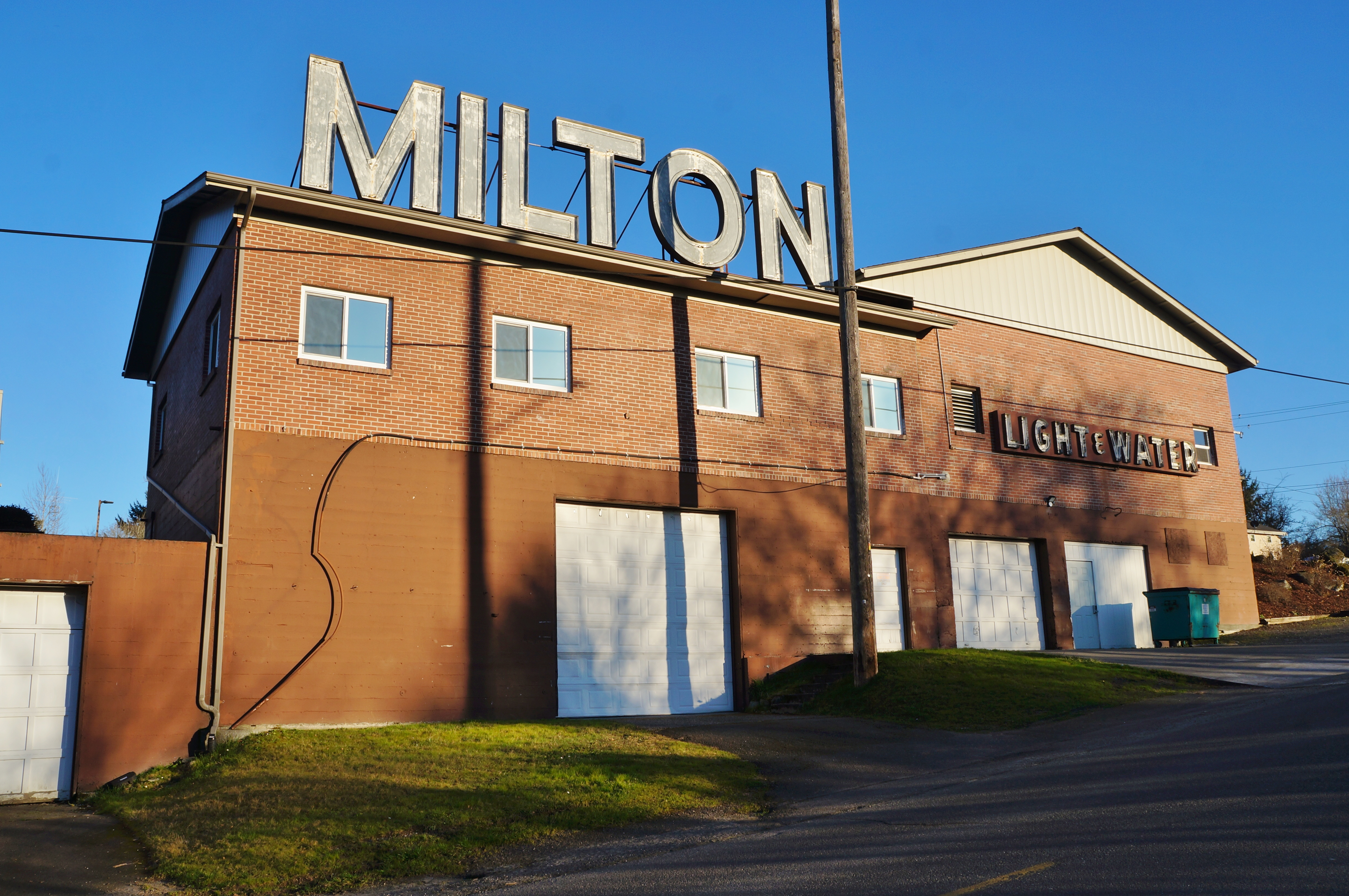
- City hall
- Nickname: Mill Town
- Location of Milton, Washington
- Coordinates: 47°14′54″N 122°18′52″W
- Country: United States
- State: Washington
- Counties: Pierce, King

Government
  - Type: Mayor–council
  - Mayor: Shanna Styron Sherrell

Area
  - Total: 2.82 sq mi (7.30 km^{2})
  - Land: 2.78 sq mi (7.20 km^{2})
  - Water: 0.039 sq mi (0.10 km^{2})
- Elevation: 223 ft (68 m)

Population (2020)
  - Total: 8,697
  - Density: 2,985.6/sq mi (1,152.76/km^{2})
- Time zone: UTC-8 (Pacific (PST))
  - Summer (DST): UTC-7 (PDT)
- ZIP Code: 98354
- Area code: 253
- FIPS code: 53-46020
- GNIS feature ID: 2411114
- Website: www.miltonwa.gov

Milton is a city in King and Pierce counties in the U.S. state of Washington. The population was 8,697 at the time of the 2020 census. Milton borders the larger but newer town of Edgewood.

== Geography ==
Milton is located in northern Pierce County and southern King County.

The Milton and Edgewood areas are known informally as North Hill. This contrasts with the South Hill area on the opposite side of the Puyallup River valley.

According to the United States Census Bureau, the city has a total area of 2.55 square miles (6.60 km^{2}), of which 2.51 square miles (6.50 km^{2}) are land and 0.04 square miles (0.10 km^{2}) are water.

=== Climate ===
This region experiences warm (but not hot) and dry summers, with no average monthly temperatures above 71.6 °F (22 °C). According to the Köppen Climate Classification system, Milton has a warm-summer Mediterranean climate, abbreviated "Csb" on climate maps.

== Demographics ==
Historical population
Census	Pop.	Note	%±
1910	448		—
1920	484		8.0%
1930	559		15.5%
1940	671		20.0%
1950	1,374		104.8%
1960	2,218		61.4%
1970	2,607		17.5%
1980	3,162		21.3%
1990	4,995		58.0%
2000	5,795		16.0%
2010	6,968		20.2%
2020	8,697		24.8%
U.S. Decennial Census; 2020 Census

=== 2020 census ===
As of the 2020 census, Milton had a population of 8,697 and 3,288 families living in the city. The median age was 39.8 years; 20.9% of residents were under the age of 18 and 17.8% of residents were 65 years of age or older, with 93.6 males for every 100 females and 90.7 males for every 100 females age 18 and over. The population density was 3,128.4 inhabitants per square mile.

One hundred percent of residents lived in urban areas, while none lived in rural areas.

There were 3,525 households in Milton, of which 30.6% had children under the age of 18 living in them. Of all households, 44.8% were married-couple households, 18.6% were households with a male householder and no spouse or partner present, and 28.1% were households with a female householder and no spouse or partner present. About 28.5% of all households were made up of individuals and 12.8% had someone living alone who was 65 years of age or older.

There were 3,650 housing units, of which 3.4% were vacant. The homeowner vacancy rate was 0.8% and the rental vacancy rate was 3.4%.

Racial composition as of the 2020 census
Race	Number	Percent
White	6,086	70.0%
Black or African American	352	4.0%
American Indian and Alaska Native	112	1.3%
Asian	575	6.6%
Native Hawaiian and Other Pacific Islander	187	2.2%
Some other race	391	4.5%
Two or more races	994	11.4%
Hispanic or Latino (of any race)	995	11.4%

The ancestry of Milton was 15.6% German, 9.5% English, 8.2% Irish, 6.4% Norwegian, 4.2% Scottish, 2.0% French, 1.9% Polish, and 0.2% Sub-Saharan African.

=== 2010 census ===
As of the 2010 census, there were 6,968 people, 2,901 households, and 1,834 families living in the city. The population density was 2,776.1 inhabitants per square mile (1,071.9/km^{2}). There were 3,081 housing units at an average density of 1,227.5 per square mile (473.9/km^{2}). The racial makeup of the city was 82.9% White, 3.1% African American, 1.2% Native American, 5.1% Asian, 0.8% Pacific Islander, 1.7% from other races, and 5.2% from two or more races. Hispanic or Latino of any race were 5.4% of the population.

There were 2,901 households, of which 33.1% had children under the age of 18 living with them, 44.5% were married couples living together, 13.5% had a female householder with no husband present, 5.2% had a male householder with no wife present, and 36.8% were non-families. 28.3% of all households were made up of individuals, and 10.3% had someone living alone who was 65 years of age or older. The average household size was 2.40 and the average family size was 2.95.

The median age in the city was 36.7 years. 23.4% of residents were under the age of 18; 9.3% were between the ages of 18 and 24; 28.9% were from 25 to 44; 26.5% were from 45 to 64; and 12% were 65 years of age or older. The gender makeup of the city was 47.7% male and 52.3% female.

=== 2000 census ===
As of the 2000 census, there were 5,795 people, 2,390 households, and 1,563 families living in the city. The population density was 2,291.3 people per square mile (884.4/km^{2}). There were 2,503 housing units at an average density of 989.7 per square mile (382.0/km^{2}). The racial makeup of the city was 90.34% White, 1.14% African American, 1.17% Native American, 2.83% Asian, 0.28% Pacific Islander, 0.79% from other races, and 3.45% from two or more races. Hispanic or Latino of any race were 3.55% of the population.

There were 2,390 households, out of which 31.2% had children under the age of 18 living with them, 49.7% were married couples living together, 11.3% had a female householder with no husband present, and 34.6% were non-families. 28.0% of all households were made up of individuals, and 10.1% had someone living alone who was 65 years of age or older. The average household size was 2.39 and the average family size was 2.92.

In the city, the population was spread out, with 24.8% under the age of 18, 7.3% from 18 to 24, 31.7% from 25 to 44, 22.3% from 45 to 64, and 13.9% who were 65 years of age or older. The median age was 38 years. For every 100 females, there were 93.6 males. For every 100 women age 18 and over, there were 91.5 men.

The median income for a household in the city was $48,166, and the median income for a family was $64,105. Males had a median income of $41,508 versus $30,111 for females. The per capita income for the city was $22,400. About 4.8% of families and 8.0% of the population were below the poverty line, including 12.2% of those under age 18 and 7.4% of those age 65 or over.

== Education ==
Most of Milton, including all of the Pierce County portion, is served by Fife Public Schools. Other parts of the King County portion are in the Federal Way School District.

== Notable people ==
- Katrina Asay, state legislator
- Kenneth Simmons, state legislator and local politician

== See also ==
- Surprise Lake (Washington)
