= Puyallup Public Library =

Public library system in Washington

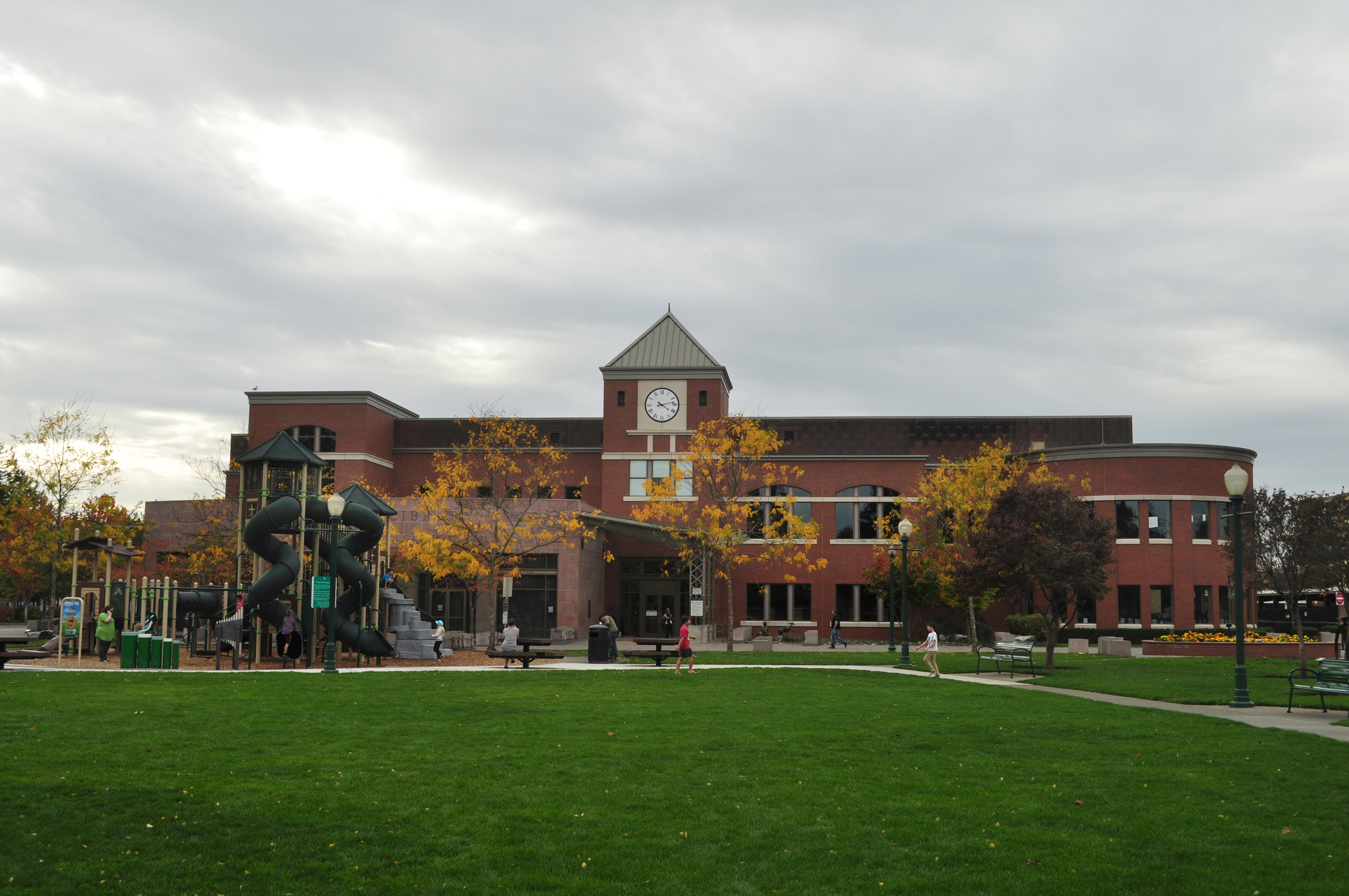
- 47.189588°N 122.295169°W
- Location: 324 South Meridian, Puyallup, Washington
- Established: 1913

Collection
- Size: 222,383 (2019)

Access and use
- Circulation: 278,740 (2019)
- Population served: 41,570 (2019)
- Members: 26,785 (2019)

Other information
- Budget: 2,966,940 (2021)
- Director: Nicole Erickson
- Employees: 16,725 FTE (2021)
- Website: puyalluplibrary.org

Puyallup Public Library is the public library system serving the residents of Puyallup, Washington. The current Puyallup Public Library, the third in the city's history, opened August 30, 2002 on the west side of Pioneer Park. The 39,500-square-foot (3,670 m^{2}) library contains two floors of materials including books, DVDs, audio books, periodicals, public computers, reading areas, study rooms, and several meeting rooms available to community groups. The library is governed by a 5-member board appointed by the City Manager. It is not affiliated with either the Tacoma Public Library or the Pierce County Library System.

== History ==
The first library in Puyallup was created in 1877 before the town formally existed. The library was run by Eliza Jane Meeker, wife of Puyallup founder Ezra Meeker, who lent books from their home in what is currently Pioneer Park. In 1880 the Puyallup Library Association was created to expand the community service. The association raised $5,000 by local businesses to rent a small room and hire its first librarian.

=== Carnegie Library ===
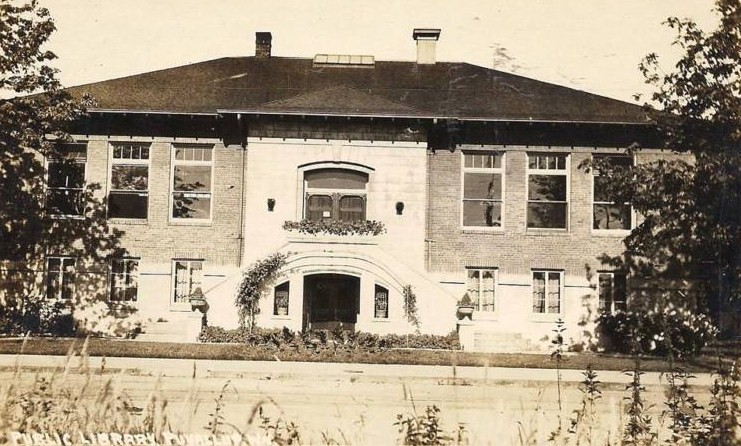
The original Puyallup Carnegie Library

Towards the turn of the century the library required repairs and upgrades, and the town of Puyallup requested funding from Andrew Carnegie for the creation of a new library. On February 15, 1912 Carnegie offered the town $12,500 on the condition they pay an annual 10% upkeep and maintenance fee. The town accepted the grant and the new Carnegie library, designed by Roland E. Borhek in the Georgian style, officially opened on February 11, 1913.

The Carnegie library was in operation until the 1950s when it was deemed by the county to be unsafe due to the bowing of the second floor from the weight of the books. Despite the razing of the building the library system hosted a 100-year celebration of the original library in 2013 and attempted to raise $12,000 to match the original grant for library use.

=== Modern library ===
After 50 years, the Carnegie Library was replaced by new 11,622-square-foot (1,079.7 m^{2}) replacement library building paid for by a voter-approved $210,000 bond. Another bond was approved by voters on September 14, 1999 to again reconstruct the library facility, expanding its total size to 39,500 square feet (3,670 m^{2}). This current library opened in 2002. Along with the new renovation the library constructed a local history room, which is opened to the public once a month. The room contains local history back to the founding of the town in the late 1800s, copies of the newspaper from 1903, and other genealogical records from the town's first settlers.
