= Pierce County Library System =

Public library system in Washington

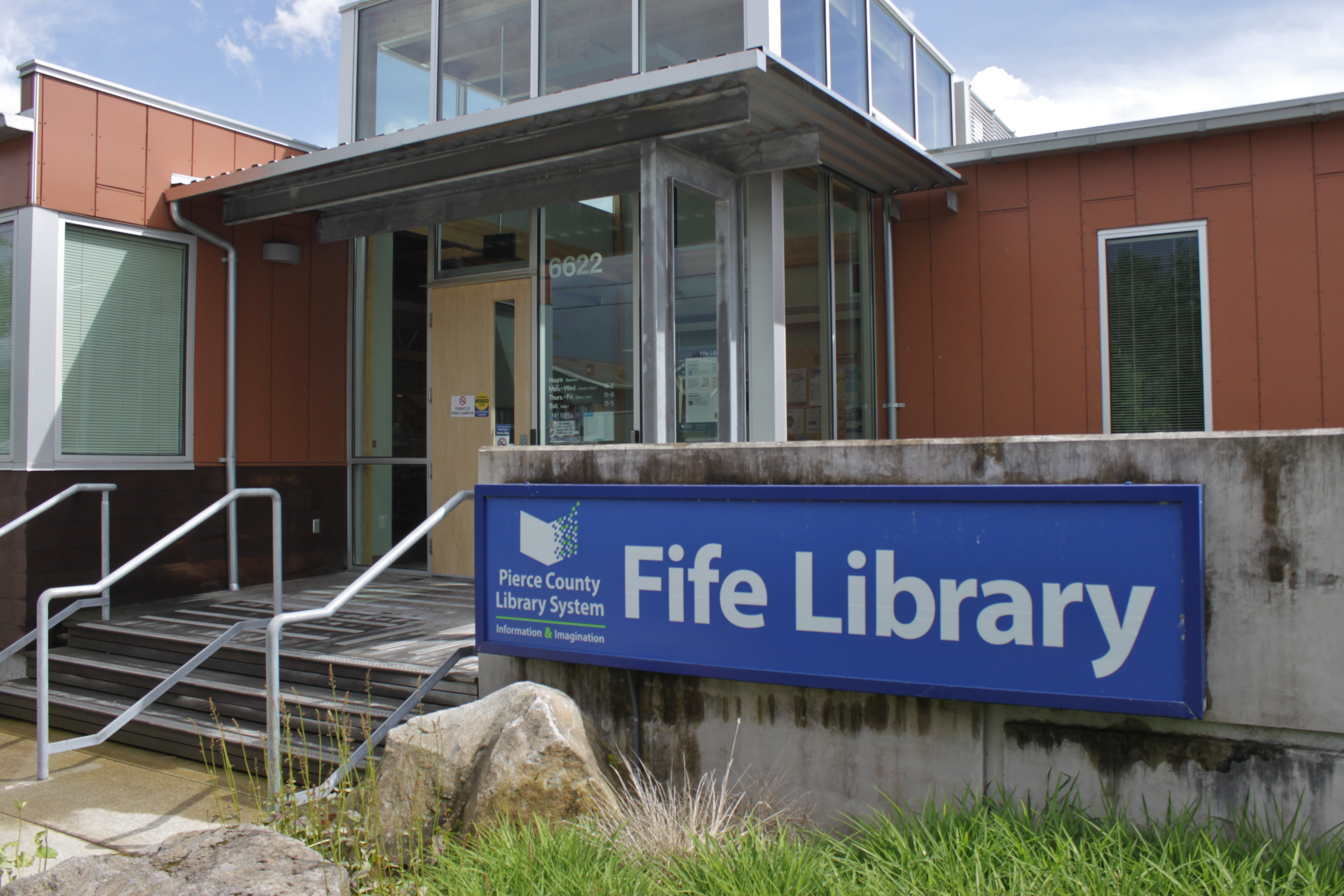
- Fife branch
- 47°09′20″N 122°23′13″W
- Location: Pierce County, Washington, US
- Type: Public library
- Established: 1946
- Branches: 20 locations

Collection
- Size: 1.2 million items

Access and use
- Circulation: 7.4 million
- Population served: 580,835
- Members: 334,362

Other information
- Budget: $31.9 million
- Director: Gretchen Caserotti
- Website: piercecountylibrary.org
- References: Washington Public Library Statistical Report, 2016

The Pierce County Library System (PCLS) is a library system serving the residents of Pierce County, Washington. The Pierce County Library System has 20 library locations serving 580,000 people in unincorporated Pierce County and 15 cities and towns which have annexed to the system for library service. It circulates 6.9 million items annually, hosts seasonal youth story times, teen clubs, events for youth and adults, classes for skills development and technology, an active summer reading program, and connects with social media. In 2016, there were 334,362 library cardholders, PCLS locations had more than 2.2 million visitors, and the website had more than 3.5 million visitors.

== History ==
The Pierce County Library System was formed by a ballot measure passed by voters in unincorporated Pierce County on November 7, 1944. The library began operating on January 2, 1946, and opened seven station branches in its first year. The system served unincorporated areas of the county as well as towns and cities that annex or contract with PCLS. When the system began in 1946, seven libraries served 55,000 people and offered 6,385 books from the Tacoma library, and the following milestones occurred throughout the system's history:

- In 1947, the first bookmobile was put into service.
- In 1984, audiobooks on cassette, library services for children in childcare centers, and a computer checkout system started.
- In 1997, the Library System website was created.
- In 1988, audiobooks on CD became available for patrons.
- In 2005, Express Checkout began, allowing customers to check out books on their own.
- In 2008, computers with high-speed internet were added to libraries.
- In 2012, the system created a website for military personnel and their families.

Over its 75+ years, it has had five directors: Marion Cromwell, Carolyn Else, Neel Parikh, Georgia Lomax, and Gretchen Caserotti.

== Locations ==
=== Current Locations ===
- Administrative Center & Library (Tacoma, Washington)
- Anderson Island
- Bonney Lake
- Buckley
- DuPont
- Eatonville
- Fife
- Gig Harbor/Peninsula
- Graham
- Key Center (Key Peninsula)
- Lakewood
- Milton/Edgewood
- Orting
- Parkland/Spanaway
- South Hill
- Steilacoom
- Summit (Tacoma)
- Sumner
- Tillicum (Lakewood)
- University Place

The library's headquarters, Administrative Center & Library, is in the Summit-Waller area, southeast of Tacoma, Washington. The busiest locations are Gig Harbor, South Hill, Lakewood, University Place, and Parkland/Spanaway.

=== Former locations ===
The library system has added and closed many other library locations over its history. Defunct branches include: American Lake Gardens, Browns Point, Longmire, McNeil Island, National, and Wilkeson.

== Service area ==
The Pierce County Library System serves all of rural Pierce County and any of the cities that have annexed into its service area. This includes all of the cities listed above, but does not include Carbonado, Fircrest, and Ruston.

== See also ==
- King County Library System
- Puyallup Public Library
- Tacoma Public Library
- Timberland Regional Library (Southwest Washington)
