= Northwest Seaport Alliance =

Port authority of Seattle and Tacoma

The Northwest Seaport Alliance
- Formation: August 4, 2015
- Type: Port authority
- Headquarters: Tacoma, Washington
- Coordinates: 47°15′54.7″N 122°24′45.8″W
- Region served: Puget Sound region
- Services: Maritime trade
- CEO: John Wolfe
- Parent organization: Port of Seattle, Port of Tacoma
- Revenue: $195 million (2017)
- Expenses: $109.1 million (2017)
- Website: nwseaportalliance.com

The Northwest Seaport Alliance is a port authority based in the Puget Sound region of the United States, comprising the seaports of Seattle and Tacoma in Washington state. The combined port authority is the sixth busiest cargo port in the United States by container volume.

The two seaports, which had been rivals for most of the 20th century but lost ground to nearby ports in British Columbia, proposed a merger of marine cargo operations in 2014. A public development authority was created in 2015 and approved by the Federal Maritime Commission, resulting in the formation of The Northwest Seaport Alliance on August 4, 2015.

== History ==
=== Background ===
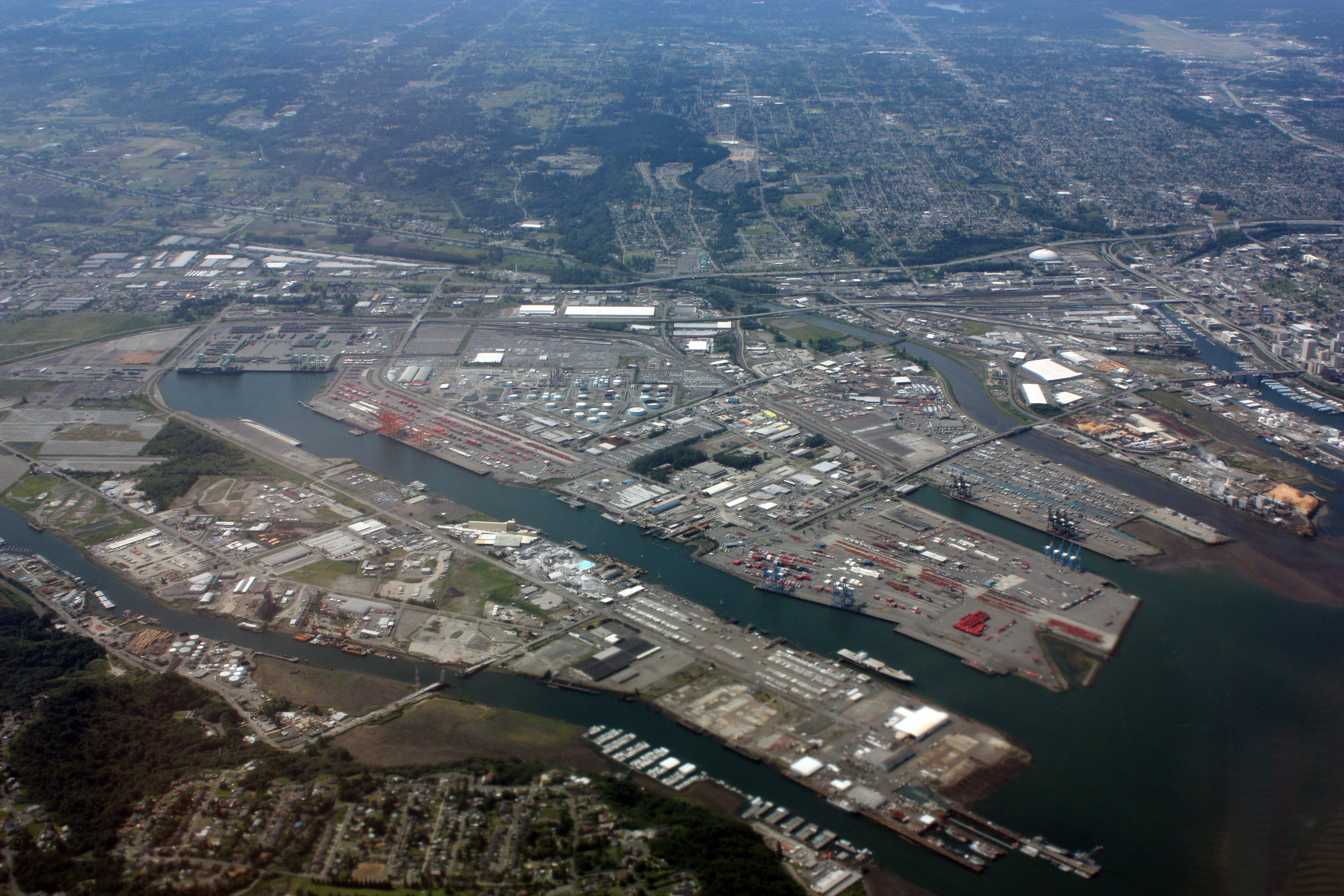
The Port of Tacoma, formed in 1918 on Commencement Bay in Tacoma

In 1911, the Washington State Legislature authorized the creation of port districts through public referendums. The ports of Seattle and Tacoma were formed separately in 1911 and 1918, respectively, to establish public control of municipal waterfronts. The two ports, located 32 miles (51 km) apart, facilitated exports of the state's natural resources and imports from Asia, which intensified during World War I at the end of the decade. During World War II, the ports were used for military shipyards and other wartime uses, reverting to civilian trade afterwards.

The rise of cargo containerization in the 1960s helped offset declining traffic to the Port of Seattle, leading to an $80 million modernization and expansion program begun in 1968. The Port of Tacoma debuted its own cargo container-ready facilities in 1970, and gradually lured away several large shipping lines from Seattle through the 1990s, including Alaska-based Totem Ocean Trailer Express (1976), SeaLand (1983), Maersk (1985), K Line (1988), and Evergreen Marine (1991). The Port of Seattle's largest line, Hyundai Merchant Marine, moved to a new, $65 million terminal in Tacoma in 1996.

By the turn of the 21st century, Tacoma eclipsed Seattle to become the largest port in the state and 7th largest in the nation, but fell behind ports in Los Angeles and nearby Vancouver. In 2009, Seattle regained its title as the larger of the ports, but both suffered losses in overall cargo volume and revenue. Tacoma lost Maersk to Seattle after Maersk signed a vessel sharing agreement with CMA CGM in 2009, but three years later attracted an alliance of three major international shippers from Seattle who had comprised 20 percent of cargo for the port.

=== Merger proposals ===
At a 1985 meeting of the Port Development Task Force of the Greater Seattle Chamber of Commerce, visiting Port Authority of New York and New Jersey executive director Peter C. Goldmark suggested that the merger of the ports of Seattle and Tacoma would give the region "decades of advantage" over competitors in Southern California. The Port of Tacoma called a merger unnecessary and costly to their city, citing lower costs to expand in Tacoma and scaring off possible operators with higher fees; the Port of Seattle stated they were uninterested in a merger unless they could guarantee an equal partnership with Tacoma.

The two ports met in the late 1990s to discuss collaboration or a potential merger, amid the consolidating of shipping lines (favoring centralized distribution centers in fewer ports) and the merging of the state's railroad system into BNSF Railway. In 2012, Port of Seattle staff estimated that rate competition with Tacoma had reduced cargo revenue by $35 million annually (approximately $70,000 per acre), based on comparisons with the Port of Oakland, which has no competing port in the region. Both ports were supported by taxpayer subsidies by their respective counties and lost revenue as shipping and terminal operators used their rivalry to negotiate lower rates. Both factors led to the Washington State Legislature proposing a merger of the ports of Seattle, Tacoma and Everett in 2008, which stalled after the Port of Tacoma opposed.

Competition for the two ports intensified in the late 2000s and early 2010s, coming primarily from the new Vancouver Fraser Port Authority, an amalgamation of three Vancouver-area ports, as well as Los Angeles and the East Coast (as a result of the Panama Canal expansion project). In 2014, the market share of ports in British Columbia tripled and overtook the combined traffic of Seattle and Tacoma for the first time. The port commissions began talks of a merger in early 2014, including an agreement to share rates and other information under federal oversight and an "unusual" joint announcement for the transfer of a local shipping line to Tacoma.

=== Formation of alliance ===
On October 7, 2014, the ports of Seattle and Tacoma formally announced their intention to move management of their marine cargo businesses to a joint alliance in March, ending decades of competition, because of increased threats from British Columbia and other ports. A full merger, including the two port commissions, was opposed by Tacoma, who feared that the more populous King County would have more votes on the combined commission than Pierce County, who were more dependent on the cargo port. In March 2015, the plan was pushed back to August while working on specifics of the alliance, including a decision on which legal entity it would fall under. The Washington State Legislature and Governor Jay Inslee approved the creation of a port development authority, similar to Washington's existing public development authority designation, in late April.

On June 5, 2015, the two port commissions voted unanimously to merge their marine cargo operations into the alliance, christened "The Northwest Seaport Alliance", pending approval from the Federal Maritime Commission (FMC). The FMC approved the planned alliance on July 23, 2015. On August 4, 2015, at the Federal Way city hall, the two port commissions unanimously approved a formal agreement creating The Northwest Seaport Alliance. Under the agreement, properties from both ports would be placed in a common pool and the operations would be overseen by both elected port commissions. Port of Tacoma CEO John Wolfe was selected to be the alliance's first chief executive while remaining with Tacoma. The combined port authority became the third largest cargo port in the United States and by container volume.

=== Early years ===
On February 29, 2016, the Northwest Seaport Alliance invited the CMA CGM Benjamin Franklin, the largest cargo ship to visit the United States, to dock at the Port of Seattle's Terminal 18. The move was used to test the terminal's capabilities in handling a ship of that size (in the range of 18,000 twenty-foot equivalent units, or TEUs) and promote expansion of Terminal 5 into a facility to handle larger ships. In April 2016, the alliance approved $141 million in funding to upgrade piers and cranes at the Port of Tacoma's Husky Terminal.

The alliance celebrated its first anniversary in August 2016 with a new joint operations center and continued growth in traffic, despite a drop in shipping caused by slower growth in Asia. Later that month, Hanjin Shipping, a major operator in Seattle, filed for bankruptcy and was barred from the Port of Seattle over fears of unpaid terminal fees. The bankruptcy sent the global shipping industry into a panic, with several Hanjin ships anchored off the Pacific coast awaiting approval to unload cargo. In December, Hanjin's Terminal 46 in Seattle was sold to an affiliate of Mediterranean Shipping Company for $78 million; the move was opposed by the Port of Seattle, who filed a request to block the sale over a lack of correspondence about the new lease and security deposit.

== Governance ==
The Northwest Seaport Alliance is a port development authority created by chapter 53.57 of the Revised Code of Washington. It is governed by the port commissions of Seattle and Tacoma, whose members are elected by the citizens of King and Pierce counties, respectively, to four-year terms. The alliance is a separate legal entity from the Port of Seattle and Port of Tacoma, for contracting, auditing and reporting purposes.

The Northwest Seaport Alliance budget for 2017 consists of $96.8 million in operating expenses, $93.4 million in revenue, and a separate capital expenses fund of $270.4 million.

== Economy ==
The ports of Seattle and Tacoma funded a joint economic impact study in 2013 and found that the ports' marine cargo divisions support a combined $138.1 billion in economic activity, equivalent to a third of Washington state's gross state product. The ports support more than 48,000 jobs, including 18,900 direct jobs, and produced $379 million in state and local taxes.

== Cargo ==
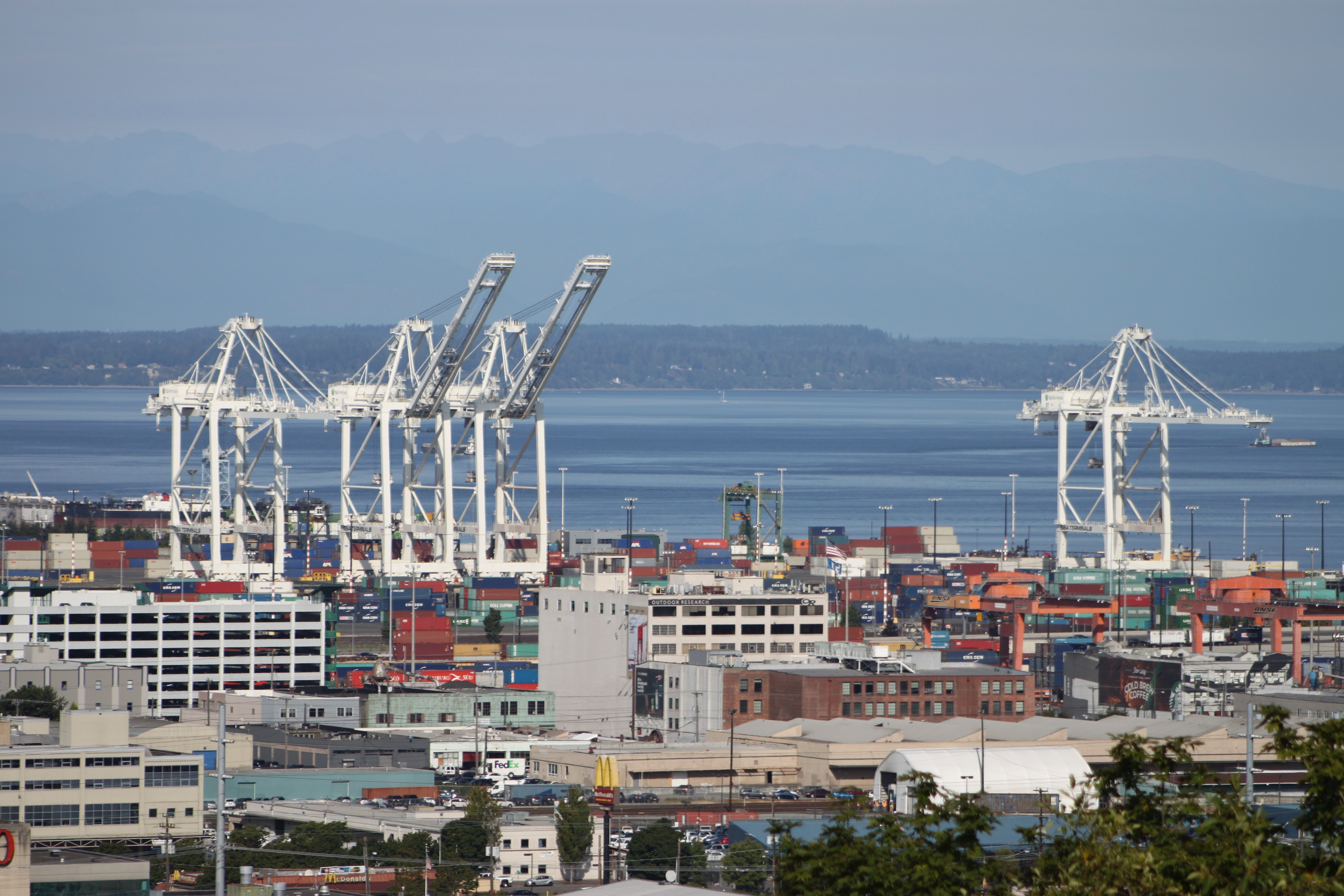
Cargo cranes at Terminal 46 of North Harbor (Port of Seattle)

For the year of 2016, the Northwest Seaport Alliance reported its container traffic totaled 3.6 million TEUs, an increase of 2 percent from 2015, and 28 million metric tons. As of 2023, it is the seventh-busiest container port in the United States according to Lloyd's List.

The two ports serve 22 international container carriers, as well as 30 other carriers, providing regular service to seaports in East Asia, Alaska, Hawaii, Central America, Europe, Australia, New Zealand, and Morocco. The alliance's top imports include industrial machinery, electronics, vehicles, toys, and furniture; its top exports include oil seeds and grains, industrial machinery, prepared vegetables and fruits, fish and seafood, edible fruits, and metals.

== Connections ==
The Northwest Seaport Alliance has direct rail connections to the Pacific Northwest and Midwest regions of the United States, provided by BNSF Railway and Union Pacific Railroad. The Port of Seattle owns Seattle–Tacoma International Airport, the region's primary airport for passengers and cargo, located 13 miles (21 km) from Seattle and 18 miles (29 km) from Tacoma. The two ports of Seattle and Tacoma are also connected to the state highway system, including Interstate 5 between both ports and Interstate 90 in Seattle. The Washington State Department of Transportation plans to enhance road connections between the two ports and Seattle–Tacoma International Airport through the Puget Sound Gateway Program. Approved in 2015 by the state legislature, the $1.6 billion program will extend State Route 167 to the Port of Tacoma and State Route 509 to Interstate 5, creating a direct freeway connection between the three areas.

== Facilities ==
The Northwest Seaport Alliance owns a total of 1,754 acres (710 ha) of property in King and Pierce counties, including 993 acres (402 ha) from the Port of Tacoma (South Harbor) and 760 acres (310 ha) from the Port of Seattle (North Harbor). The two harbors have 10 total container terminals with 23 berths and 47 cranes; there are also 7 non-container terminals used primarily for breakbulk cargo and automobiles via roll-on/roll-off ships.
