= Tacoma Public Library =

Library system in Tacoma, Washington

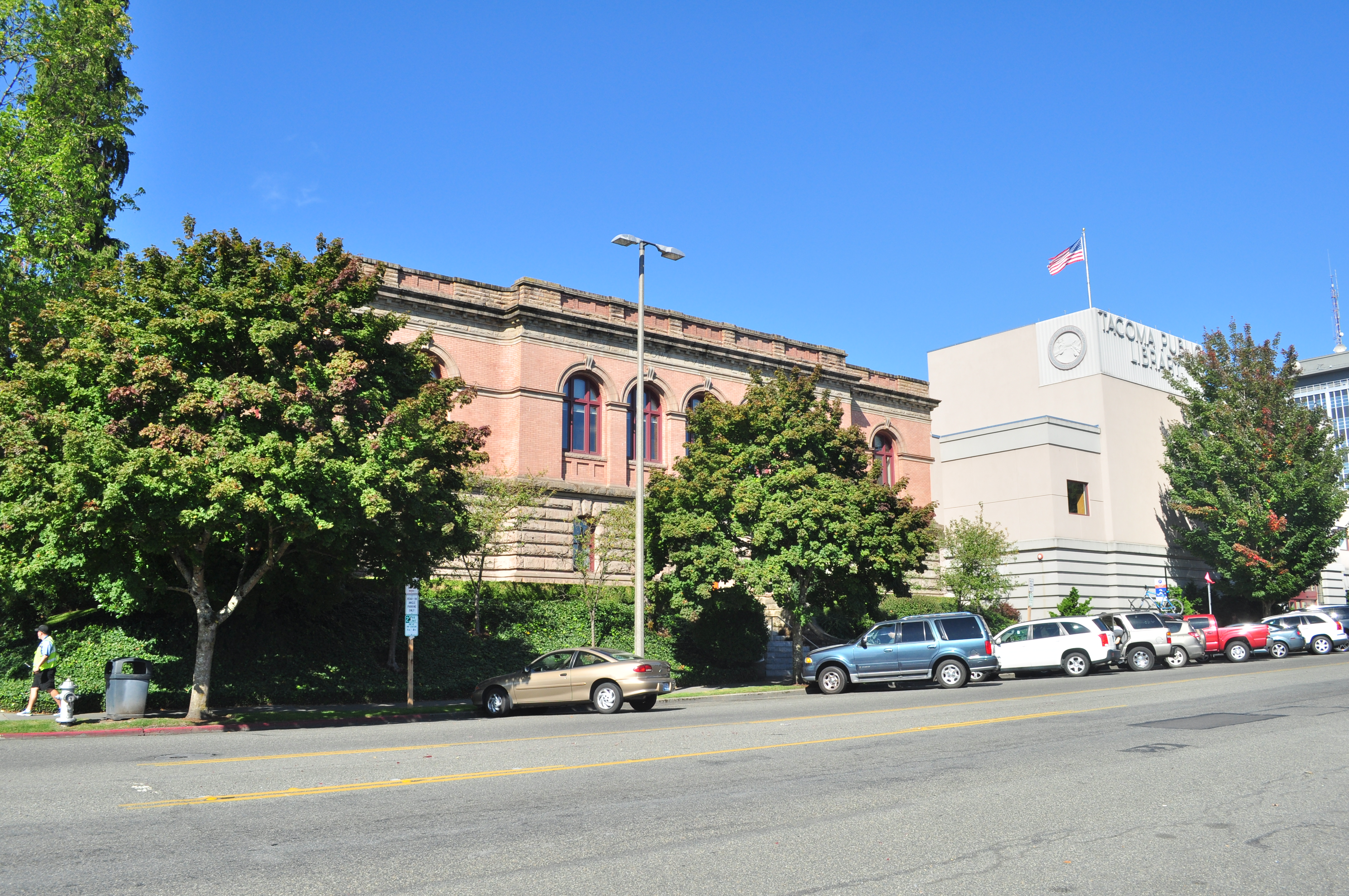
- Main Branch in Tacoma
- 47°15′09″N 122°26′41″W
- Type: Public
- Established: 1894
- Service area: Tacoma, Washington, U.S.
- Branches: 8

Collection
- Items collected: 406,524

Access and use
- Circulation: 1,774,005 (2024)
- Population served: 225,100
- Members: 183,992

Other information
- Director: Amita Lonial
- Employees: 109
- Parent organization: City of Tacoma
- Website: tacomalibrary.org
- References: Washington Public Library Statistical Report (2024)

The Tacoma Public Library (TPL) system serves the city of Tacoma, Washington, United States. It is a public library operated by the city government that has eight locations—a central library and seven branches. The Tacoma Public Library has over 180,000 registered users and serves a population of 225,100 residents; it had a circulation of 1.77 million items in 2024.

The system offers the use of computers, books, DVDs, and music at its branches and through mail services, as well as electronic databases, e-books, and audiobooks through its website. Libraries are also home to programming and community events. TPL is separate from the Pierce County Library System, which operates 19 libraries across most of the county. The Tacoma Public Library was established in 1894 after the city government funded the creation of a small public library on the fifth floor of the city hall. An earlier library had been donated to the city in 1898 but only operated for one year.

The Main Library of Tacoma was opened on June 4, 1903, and was the first Carnegie library built in Washington state. The original two-story building had a dome that was damaged in a 1949 earthquake and mostly removed at a later date. The Main Library was expanded by the construction of a new section in 1952 that spanned 67,000 square feet (6,200 m^{2}) and the original section underwent major renovations from 1988 to 1990. The addition was renovated from 2023 to 2025. The Main Library houses the Northwest Room, a special collection for Tacoma and Pacific Northwest history, and the Handforth Gallery.

A second location, the South Tacoma Branch, opened in May 1911. In 2011, the Tacoma Public Library closed two of its branches, the Martin Luther King Jr. Library near Hilltop and the Swan Creek Library in Salishan. Both branches had opened in the late 1980s as part of an expansion of the system but were closed during budget cuts due to their low circulation and other factors. A "microlibrary" kiosk stocked with books and other items opened near the former Swan Creek branch in 2019. A new logo and branding for the system was unveiled in 2025.

== Branches ==
Tacoma Public Library locations
Branch	Neighborhood	Opened	Notes
Fern Hill	Fern Hill	1950	
Kobetich	Northeast Tacoma	1980	Named for Mary Rose Kobetich
Main Branch	Central Tacoma	1903	Carnegie library; expanded in 1950
Moore	East Tacoma	1950	Named for Grace R. Moore
Mottet	McKinley Hill	1930	Named for Charlotte White Mottet
South Tacoma	South Tacoma	1911	
Swasey	West Tacoma	1950	Named for George O. Swasey
Wheelock	Proctor District	1927	Named for Anna Lemon Wheelock
