= Emerald Ridge High School =

Public secondary school in Puyallup, Washington, United States

Coordinates: 47°05′22″N 122°15′46″W

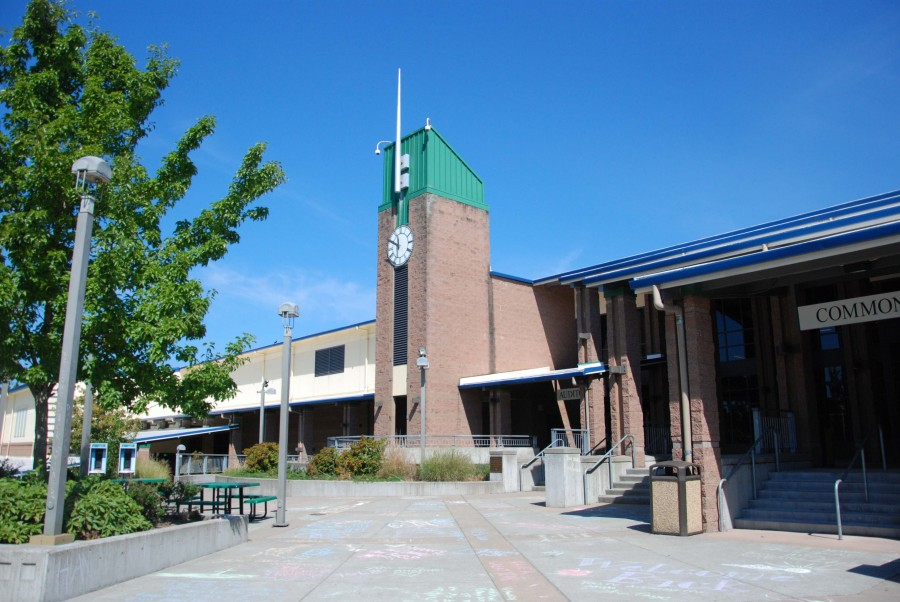
- The clock tower and Commons entrance

Location
- 12405 184th Street East; Puyallup, (Pierce County), Washington 98374; United States

Information
- Type: Public secondary
- Established: 2000
- School district: Puyallup School District
- Principal: Ed Crow
- Teaching staff: 65.40 (FTE)
- Grades: 10–12
- Enrollment: 1,599 (2024-2025)
- Student to teacher ratio: 24.45
- Campus: Suburban
- Colors: Green, Black & Silver
- Fight song: "Hail to the Victors"
- Mascot: Jaguars
- Newspaper: {JagWire
- Yearbook: Jostens
- Website: erhs.puyallupsd.org

Emerald Ridge High School is a high school in the Puyallup School District of Washington, United States and is commonly referred to as ERHS or simply ER. Emerald Ridge opened in September 2000. It features green, black and silver as its primary colors and has a jaguar as its official mascot. As of the 2023-2024 school year, the school had an enrollment of 1,574 students. Of these students, 71.9% met English standards, 30.5% met Math standards, and 38.6% met Science standards in state assessments.

== Inaugural Class of 2002 ==
This first class to graduate from ERHS was in 2002, and had their 10-year class reunion in July 2012.

== Commencement ==
Commencement, or graduation, is held every year at the Puyallup Fairgrounds in June.

== Notable alumni ==
- Denzel Boston, professional football wide receiver for the Cleveland Browns
- Megan Jendrick, née Quann, is a swimmer and double Olympic Gold medalist from the 2000 Summer Olympics in Sydney, a silver medalist at the 2008 Summer Olympics in Beijing, and author of the book Get Wet, Get Fit. Class of 2002.
- Tim Peterson, MLB pitcher for the New York Mets. Class of 2009.
- Quinn Wolcott, MLB umpire. Class of 2005.
- Melanie Stambaugh, elected to the Washington state House of Representatives in November 2014. Class of 2009.
- Tommy Snider writer producer, Class of 2002.
- Gavin Maher, a performer known professionally as "GAVN." Class of 2015.

== Mascot ==
Jake the Jaguar, sometimes known as Jake the Jag or simply Jake, is the costumed mascot of Emerald Ridge. The character is commonly portrayed by members of the school's leadership class and appears at football, volleyball, and basketball games. Jake is known for engaging with students at events and on social media platforms such as his TikTok and Instagram pages, where he has gained a notable following.

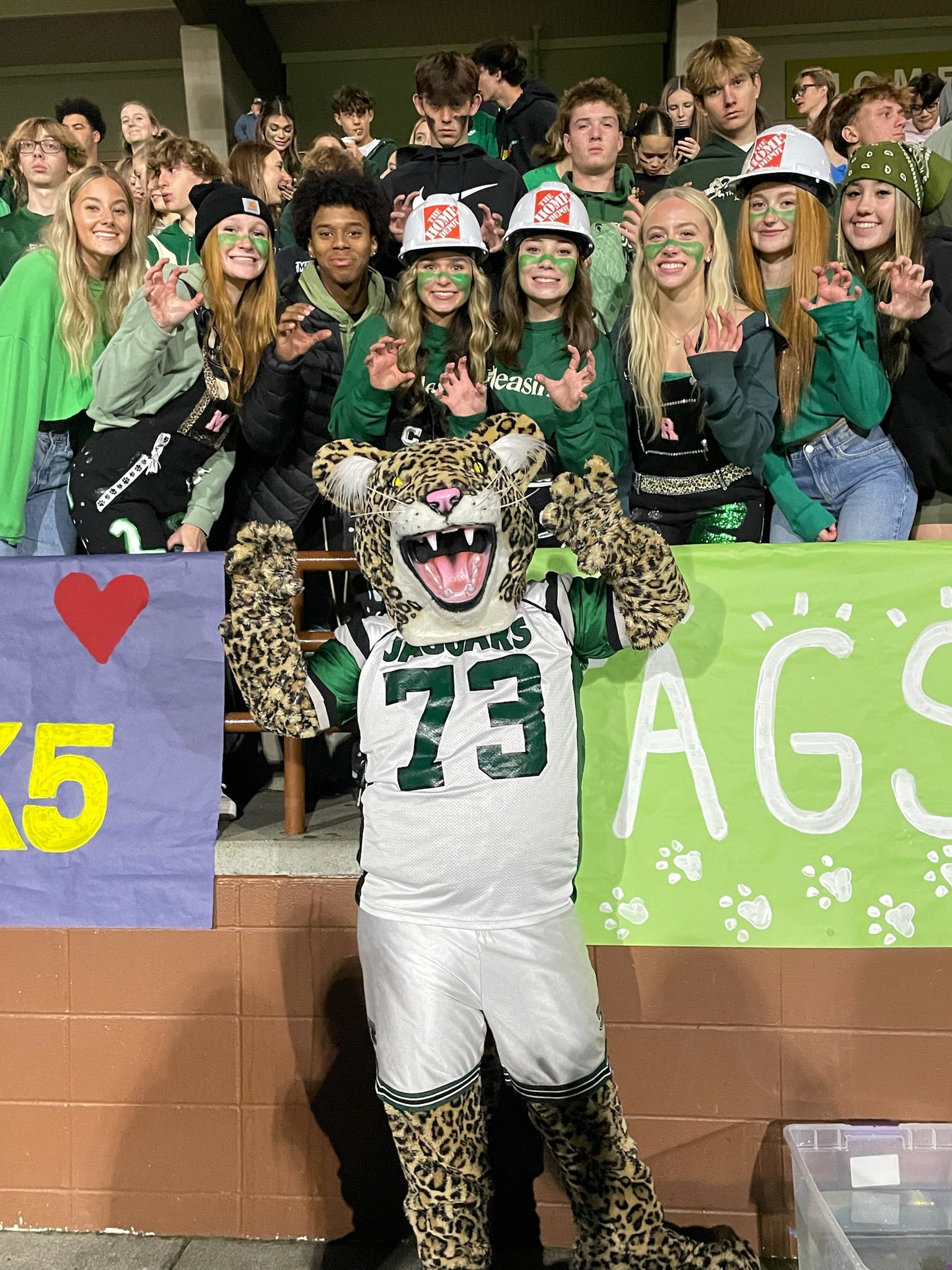
Jake the Jaguar poses with students at a Football Game

== Athletics and activities ==
- Football:
  - 2014 SPSL South league title
  - Emerald Ridge won the SPSL South league title during the 2014–2015 school year, their first ever league title. The Jags also picked up the All-City Championship by defeating both Puyallup High School and Rogers High School. They beat Rogers High School during the 2014 King of the Hill game. They've had three winning seasons at 6 wins 4 losses in the '04-'05 & '05-'06 season, and 7 wins 3 losses in the '14 - '15 season. The Jaguars won arguably their biggest game ever when they defeated their cross town rivals, Governor John R. Rogers High School (a.k.a. the Rams), on September 14, 2007, by a score of 20–19. On the Rams final drive with sixteen seconds to play, the Rams scored a touchdown. In an effort to avoid a tie, they attempted a two-point conversion the following play; they ran a sweep play towards the sideline, and just short of the goal line their running back was stopped when he tried to cut back to the middle. On the following kickoff, the game expired making Emerald Ridge the victors. The Jaguars went on to win their game the following week, and achieving the school's longest winning streak of five games.

On October 8, 2010, the Jags defeated their crosstown rivals, the Puyallup Vikings, by a score of 20–17, earning their first victory since the 2008 season. The win snapped a 19-game losing streak for the team, and was the first time they had beaten the Vikings in the school's history.

- Boys Baseball
  - 2009 2nd in SPSL South Division
- Girl Fastpitch
  - 2009 SPSL Tournament Champions (Undefeated)
- Girls Bowling:
  - 2015 4A State Fourth Place
  - 2010 4A State Champions (Undefeated)
  - 2010 4A State Individual Champion - Shannon Dexter
  - 2010 West Central District Champions
  - 2010 SPSL Tournament Champions
  - 2010 SPSL League Champions (Undefeated)
  - 2009 4A State Champions (Undefeated)
  - 2009 West Central District Champions
  - 2009 SPSL Tournament Champions
  - 2009 SPSL League Champions (Undefeated)
  - 2008 SPSL Tournament Champions
- Girls Golf:
  - 2014 SPSL South league Champions (9-1)
  - 2005 SPSL Undefeated Champions
  - 2004 SPSL Champions (9-1)
- Boys Golf:
  - 2014 SPSL South league Champions (10-0)
  - 2008 SPSL Champions (9-1)
  - 2005 SPSL Undefeated Champions
- Volleyball:
  - 2nd Place 2014 4A State
  - 3rd Place 2013 4A State
  - 3rd Place 2005 4A State
  - League Champions 2005 SPSL South
  - District Champions 2005 SPSL
  - 4th Place 2004 4A State
  - 4th Place 2003 4A State
  - 6th Place 2002 4A State
  - 5th Place 2001 4A State
- Girls Tennis:
  - 2005 SPSL South Champions
  - 4th Place 2004 4A State
  - 2004 SPSL South Champions
  - 2004 SPSL District Champions
  - 5th Place 2003 4A State
  - 6th Place 2002 4B State
- Girls Wrestling:
- Boys Wrestling:
  - 2006 SPSL South Dual Meet Champions
  - 2006 SPSL South Tournament Champions
  - 2005 SPSL South Dual Meet Champions (Undefeated)
  - 2005 Regional Champions
  - 6th Place 2005 4A State
- Boys Cross Country
  - 2016 State Championship 15th Place
  - 2014 SPSL South Champions (6-0)
  - 2014 State Championship 16th Place
  - 2008 Co-SPSL South Champions (7-1)
  - 2008 State Championship 15th Place
  - 2009 SPSL South Champions (5-0)
- Girls Cross Country
  - 2014 SPSL South Champions
  - 2009 SPSL South Champions (5-0)
- Speech and Debate (Forensics)
  - The Emerald Ridge Speech and Debate Team is currently inactive. It was headed by Coach Julie Hillend-Jones. The team did remarkably well in both regional and state competitions (Washington Interscholastic Activities Association State Forensics Tournament), receiving many awards and recognition. It also sent representatives for Student Congress to the national competition of the National Speech and Debate Association in both 2009 and 2010. In 2011, it sent a representative to Nationals for Dramatic Interpretation for the first time. The team competed at tournaments all over Western Washington and even at the Annual Tom Foley Tournament, hosted by University High School
- Dance Team
  - Achieved Excellent and Superior Ratings at the state level in the WIAA Dance/Drill Competitions every year except 2007
- Gymnastics
  - 2015 State qualifying team
  - 2015 West Central District III Meet Second Place
  - 2011–2012, 2012–2013, and 2013–2014 SPSL South Champions
  - 2012–2013 West Central Districts Champions
  - 2012–2013 Team State Champions
  - 2012–2013 Sportsmanship Award
  - 2012–2013 Undefeated season (10-0)

== Daffodil Festival ==
Every year, Emerald Ridge participates in the Pierce County Daffodil Festival. A competition is held in house to select the Puyallup Princess, who goes on to compete against other regional schools, for the Daffodil Festival Queen title. The Queen title is considered the highest honor of the regional festival. The Emerald Ridge band accompanies the float of Emerald Ridge's princesses every year in the parade, held annually in April. The Queen and runners-up receive scholarships for post-high school education, and 2009 was the first year that one of ERHS's princesses was selected as Queen (Melanie Stambaugh). In the 2013–2014 school year ERHS selected two Daffodil princesses. One of them went on to become the Daffodil Queen (Marissa Modestowicz).

== JagWire newsmagazine ==
Emerald Ridge's official newspaper is {JagWire} newsmagazine. The paper was named by a Puyallup High School teacher and the adviser of the Viking Vanguard.

{JagWire} published a 28-page monthly newspaper for many years until it was dropped to a 16-page newsmagazine in 2010. During that time the print publication followed mostly the same design, until a redesign in 2010 led by then Editor-in-Chief Allie Rickard, the 2010–2011 WJEA Journalist of the Year.

During the 2014–2015 school year, {JagWire} dropped down to six 16-page publications that year instead of the usual eight. That same year {JagWire} started its online addition to the print publication, erhsjagwire.com, and set up social media accounts for Twitter (@GetJagWired) and Instagram (@erjagwire). The print publication also featured a new design, the first since 2010.

For the 2018–2019 school year the school district dropped the newspaper class at Emerald Ridge due to low student interest, marking the first year JagWire did not publish an issue. However, despite the continued absence of a newspaper class to run it, {JagWire} now exists as an exclusively online publication, with articles by volunteer students and staff. This online publication is found on jagwire.org, which replaced the old, now unavailable website.

{JagWire} has won various state and national awards for its print publication, as well as numerous individual write-off awards from its staff members.

- National Awards
  - 2002 NSPA National Online Pacemaker Award for Jagwired.com (Phoenix, Arizona)
  - 2002 6th place NSPA Best of Show: Newspaper Special Issue (Phoenix, Arizona)
  - 2002 2nd place NSPA Best of Show: Newsmagazine (Phoenix, Arizona)
  - 2002 10th place NSPA Best of Show: Newsmagazine (Dallas, Texas)
  - 2002 Columbia Scholastic Press Association: Gold Medal Certificate (New York, New York)
  - 2003 6th place NSPA Best of Show: Newspaper Special Issue (Portland, Oregon)
  - 2003 6th place NSPA Best of Show: Newsmagazine (Portland, Oregon)
  - 2003 Columbia Scholastic Press Association: Silver Crown Certificate (New York, New York)
  - 2004 5th place NSPA Best of Show: Newsmagazine (San Diego, California)
  - 2005 NSPA Newspaper Pacemaker Award finalist (Seattle, Washington)
  - 2005 3rd place NSPA Best of Show: Newsmagazine (Seattle, Washington)
  - 2005 2nd Place NSPA Best of Show: Newsmagazine (Chicago, Illinois)
  - 2006 3rd place NSPA Best of Show: Newsmagazine (San Francisco, California)
  - 2006 7th Place NSPA Best of Show: Newsmagazine (Nashville, Tennessee)
  - 2006 NSPA National Newspaper Pacemaker Award winner (Nashville, Tennessee)
  - 2006 NSPA Best Cover Design - Best of the High School Press
  - 2011 NSPA Best Special Coverage - Best of the High School Press
  - 2015 SNO Excellence in Writing badge for erhsjagwire.com
  - 2015 10th Place NSPA Best of Show: Newspaper Tabloid 16 or Fewer Pages (Denver, Colorado)

2015 National Scholastic Press Association Best of Show Award for JagWire

- State Awards
  - 2002 WJEA Best of Show Award
  - 2004 WJEA Best of Show Award
  - 2005 Edward R. Murrow Symposium Award: 1st place Best Edition (WSU: Pullman, Washington)
  - 2006 WJEA Best of Show Award
  - 2008 WJEA Best of Show Award

== See also ==
- Puyallup School District
