= Dawn Morrell =

American politician (born 1949)

Member of the Washington House of Representatives from the 25th district
- In office January 14, 2013 – January 12, 2015
- Preceded by: Bruce Dammeier
- Succeeded by: Melanie Stambaugh
- In office January 13, 2003 – January 10, 2011
- Preceded by: Dave Morell
- Succeeded by: Hans Zeiger

Personal details
- Born: July 30, 1949 (age 77) Blackfoot, Idaho, U.S.
- Party: Democratic
- Spouse: James Morrell
- Education: Solano Community College (AA, ASN); University of Washington (BSN)
- Website: Official

Lavonna Dawn Morrell (born July 30, 1949) is an American politician and nurse who served as a member of the Washington House of Representatives from the 25th Legislative District. She works as a critical care nurse at MultiCare Good Samaritan Hospital in Puyallup.

== Career ==
Morrell was first elected to the Washington House of Representatives in November 2002 and was subsequently re-elected in 2004, 2006 and 2008. Morrell's district included the cities of Puyallup and Fife and the unincorporated Pierce County communities of South Hill, Summit, and Waller.

She was defeated by Hans Zeiger in 2010 by a 47-vote margin, but returned to the House after her election in 2012. She lost re-election in 2014 to Melanie Stambaugh.

Morrell was the chair of the Appropriations Subcommittee on Health and Human Services in the House. She was also on the Appropriations, Health Care & Wellness, and Technology & Economic Development Committees. During her tenure, Morrell also served as both Majority Caucus Chair and Deputy Majority Whip in the State House.
