= E.B. Walker High School =

Location
- 5715 Milwaukee Ave E Puyallup, Washington; United States; 47.2051°N 122.2824°W

Information
- Type: Public, Alternative
- Established: 1975
- School district: Puyallup School District
- Principal: Michael Sanchez
- Teaching staff: 10.20 (2023-24)
- Grades: 9–12
- Enrollment: 120 (2024-25)
- Student to teacher ratio: 12.35 (2023-24)
- Mascot: Wolves
- Website: whs.puyallupsd.org/

E.B. Walker High School, also known as Walker High, is a public alternative high school located in Puyallup, Washington, serving students in grades 9 through 12. It is part of the Puyallup School District 3. The school offers a non-traditional learning environment designed to support students who may benefit from a different approach than comprehensive high schools. Its mission is "Creating Hope, Inspiring Potential, and Changing Lives".

The school was originally established in 1975 as the Puyallup Continuation School and has undergone several name changes, adopting its current name in honor of former Puyallup School District Superintendent Edmund B. Walker. E.B. Walker High School provides various academic programs, including credit retrieval and Career and Technical Education (CTE) pathways, alongside robust student support services.

== History ==
E.B. Walker High School has a history rooted in providing alternative educational pathways within the Puyallup School District. The site of the current school was originally home to the North Puyallup School, a two-level brick schoolhouse built in 1909 that served elementary students. This original building featured a large, 300-pound cast iron bell used to signal the start of the school day.

In 1975, the brick schoolhouse was repurposed and reopened as the Puyallup Continuation School (PCS), designed to serve secondary students. Judith Billings, who later became a Washington State Superintendent of Public Instruction, served as the first Coordinator of this program. Earlene Bogrand became principal in 1980 and is credited with significantly shaping the future of alternative education in the Puyallup School District over her two-decade tenure, laying the groundwork for the school as it exists today.

The original North Puyallup School building was demolished by the local fire department in 1986 to make way for a new facility for the continuation school. This new building, constructed on the south side of the site, was funded as a state-matched project with local funding from the 1984 Bond Issue. Erickson McGovern Architects of Tacoma designed the new structure, and Robert Smith Builders, also from Tacoma, served as the general contractor. Upon the opening of this new building in 1986, the school was renamed the Puyallup Alternative School (PAS).

The property on which the school stands was reportedly given to the Puyallup School District with the stipulation that the land would remain with the district as long as a school continued to operate on it. Since its inception in 1975, the school has maintained its focus on supporting students who may have found challenges in traditional settings, aiming to be a "beacon of light".

The concept of "continuation schools" and alternative education was part of broader educational movements. In Washington State, alternative schools are designed to offer choices in teaching and learning styles and program operations, often developed through cooperation between teachers, students, administrators, and parents. These movements, particularly prominent in the 1960s and 1970s, sought to provide options for students for whom traditional schooling was not a good fit.

=== Namesake - Edmund B. Walker ===
E.B. Walker High School is named in honor of Edmund B. Walker (1861–1921). Born in New Albany, Indiana, in 1861, Mr. Walker began his career in public education there. After relocating to the west, he served as principal of Spinning School in Puyallup. His career progressed to superintendent roles, first for the Auburn School District and subsequently for the Puyallup School District.

During his twelve-year tenure as Superintendent of the Puyallup School District, Edmund B. Walker was known for his active involvement in civic affairs. He was recognized for his progressive and supportive approach to educational policies. His contributions to the development of education in Puyallup led to the decision to name the alternative high school in his honor. E.B. Walker died in 1921.

== Academics and programs ==
E.B. Walker High School operates as an alternative learning environment within the Puyallup School District, catering to students who may benefit from a more individualized or flexible approach to education. The Puyallup School District defines an Alternative Learning Experience (ALE) as a program that offers flexibility in a non-traditional setting, requiring students to demonstrate engagement and make weekly contact. While the specific application of ALE principles to E.B. Walker's model is not fully detailed in all public documents, its structure aligns with the goals of providing personalized support and varied educational opportunities.

=== Specific programs ===
E.B. Walker High School offers several key programs and service:

- Counseling & Career Center: Provides guidance for academic and career planning, including access to the PSD Scholarship Directory.
- Edgenuity Credit Retrieval: An option for students needing to recover academic credits.
- GESA High School Credit Union Program: Offers financial education and services.
- Open Doors: A youth re-engagement program.
- Title I/LAP (Learning Assistance Program): Provides additional support for eligible students.
- Varsity Letter in Volunteer Service: Recognizes student commitment to community service.
- Career and Technical Education (CTE): The staff directory lists a High School CTE Teacher, and the SIP mentions that two full-time teachers are CTE teachers. The district offers CTE courses in areas like Business and Marketing, Health Sciences, Human Services, Science and Natural Resources, and Skilled and Technical Sciences.

== Student life ==
Student life at E.B. Walker High School is characterized by a supportive environment with opportunities for engagement in various activities and access to comprehensive support services. The school aims to foster strong relationships and a positive community, as evidenced by Panorama data cited in the School Improvement Plan, which shows 81% of students feel supported by the Walker community.

=== Extracurricular activities ===
E.B. Walker High School offers a range of clubs and activities, often held during the school day to encourage participation. Examples derived from the "2025 Outstanding Seniors" profiles and school resources include a Gardening Club, Dungeons & Dragons with the Gaming Guild, POD (Program of Choice) Associated Student Body (ASB), Sewing Club, the W.O.L.F. Ambassador program, Creative Writing Club, Wolf Tech Robotics (Team 8896), Frisbee Golf Club, and a Photography Club. The W.O.L.F. Ambassadors program focuses on advocacy, leadership development, supporting new students, and enhancing the school's community presence. The general Associated Student Body (ASB) is also listed as a resource for student involvement.

=== Athletics policy ===
Students attending E.B. Walker High School are eligible to participate in athletics and activities at their resident comprehensive high school within the Puyallup School District (namely Emerald Ridge, Rogers, or Puyallup High Schools). This policy allows Walker students to access a full range of traditional WIAA-sanctioned sports and activities. To be eligible, students must maintain a 2.0 GPA and pass a minimum of five classes, in accordance with Puyallup School District and Washington Interscholastic Activities Association (WIAA) standards. This arrangement allows E.B. Walker to focus its resources on its core alternative academic mission and specialized in-house clubs, while ensuring its students are not disadvantaged in terms of athletic opportunities.

The Puyallup School District also offers alternative pathways for students to meet physical education credit requirements, including participation in directed athletics, which can be either school-based or community-based programs.

=== Student support services ===
E.B. Walker High School provides student support services. These services include:

- Academic and Personal Counseling: Multiple counselors are on staff, including school counselors, a PODS counselor, and a Heidi's Promise Counselor. A Licensed Mental Health Therapist is also part of the staff.
- Health Services: A school nurse and a Licensed Practical Nurse are available to students.
- Nutritional Support: Child Nutrition services are provided.
- Logistical Support: Transportation services and assistance with online payments are available.
- Language Access: Interpretation and translation services are offered to support multilingual families.
- Learning Environment Support: The school utilizes Schoology as a learning management system and provides a Rights & Responsibilities Handbook. Integrated Student Support Engagement Coordinators and Campus Security staff contribute to a safe and supportive campus environment.
- Community Resources: The school connects students and families with broader community resources.

== Demographics ==
In the 2024-2025 school year, 40.0% of the students at E.B. WHS were male, 57.5% were female, and 2.5% were Gender X. 1.7% were Native American, 1.7% were Native Hawaiian/Other Pacific Islander, 22.5% were Hispanic/Latino, 0.8% were Black/African American, 62.5% were White, and 10.8% were Two or More Races.

== See also ==
- Puyallup School District
- Alternative education
- Continuation school
- Washington Office of Superintendent of Public Instruction
