= Logan Ice =

American baseball player (born 1995)

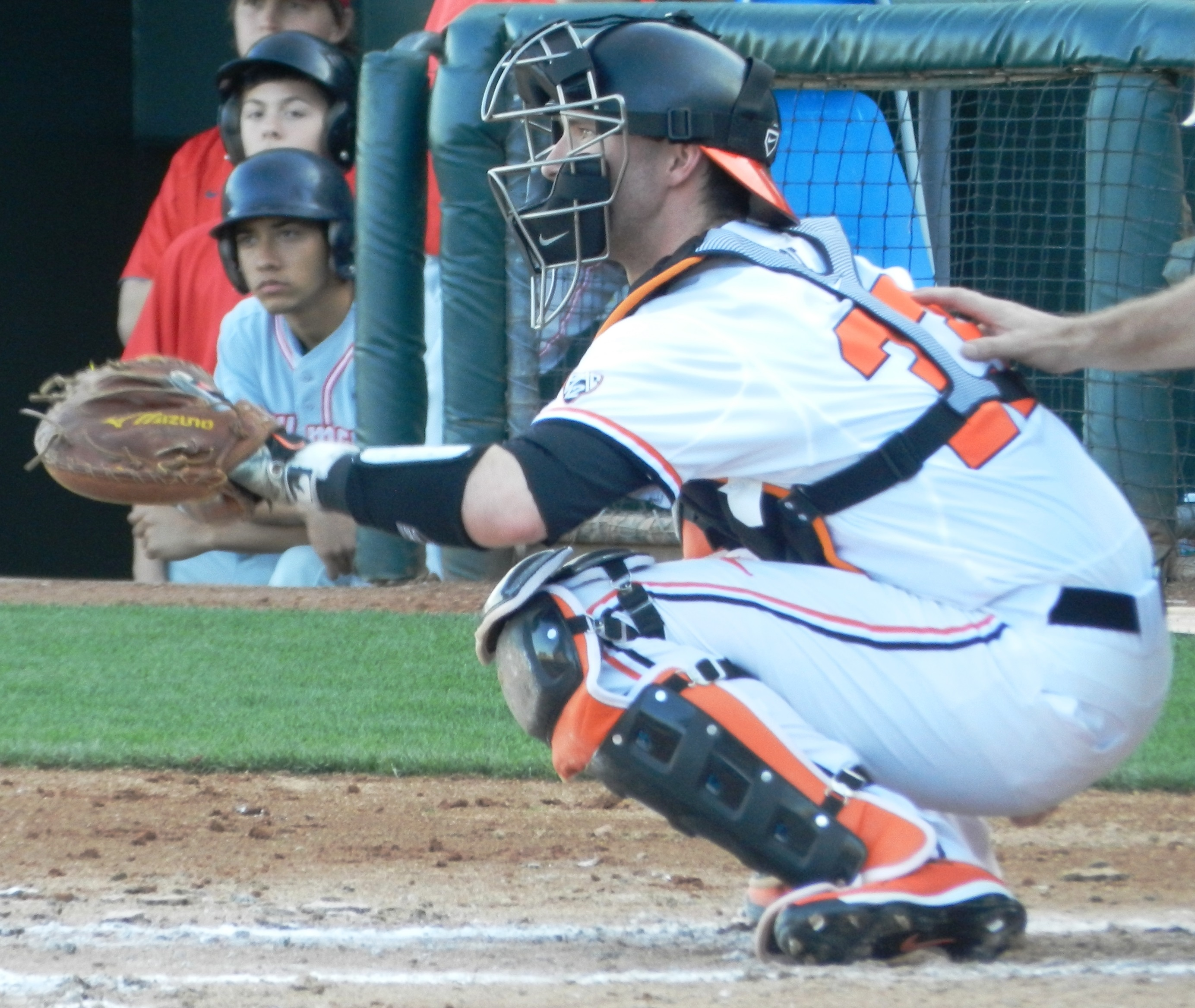
- Ice in 2015 with Oregon State
- Catcher
- Born: May 27, 1995 (age 31); Puyallup, Washington, U.S.
- Bats: Switch Throws: Right
- Stats at Baseball Reference

Logan Durrell Ice (born May 27, 1995) is an American former professional baseball catcher.

== Career ==
Ice attended Governor John R. Rogers High School in Puyallup, Washington. In his freshman year, he became the starting catcher for the school's varsity baseball team.

Not selected in the 2013 MLB draft, Ice enrolled at Oregon State University and played college baseball for the Oregon State Beavers. He became the team's starting catcher as a freshman, starting in 53 of the team's 59 games that year. Known for his defensive abilities, Ice only batted .250. His batting average improved to .276 in his sophomore year. After the 2015 season, he played collegiate summer baseball with the Falmouth Commodores of the Cape Cod Baseball League. In his junior year, Ice batted .310 with seven home runs and 39 RBIs in 54 games, and threw out 44% of attempted base stealers. Ice was named to the Pac-12 Conference's First Team and was named the Pac-12 Defensive Player of the Year and a finalist for the Johnny Bench Award.

The Cleveland Indians selected Ice with the 72nd overall selection of the 2016 MLB draft. Ice signed with the Indians, receiving an $850,000 signing bonus. He spent his first professional season with the Mahoning Valley Scrappers where he batted .198 with two home runs and eight RBIs in 39 games. In 2017, he played for the Lake County Captains, posting a .228 batting average with 11 home runs and 42 RBIs in 93 games, and in 2018, he played with both the Lynchburg Hillcats and the Akron RubberDucks, batting .208 with one home run and 29 RBIs in sixty games between both teams. In 2019, with the Akron RubberDucks, he batted .180 with four home runs and 22 RBIs in 79 games.

In October 2019, Ice appeared on the NPR podcast Planet Money.

In January 2020, Ice announced his retirement as an active player, and per his LinkedIn was working as a baseball instructor in Vancouver, Washington.
