= Melanie Stambaugh =

American politician (born 1990)

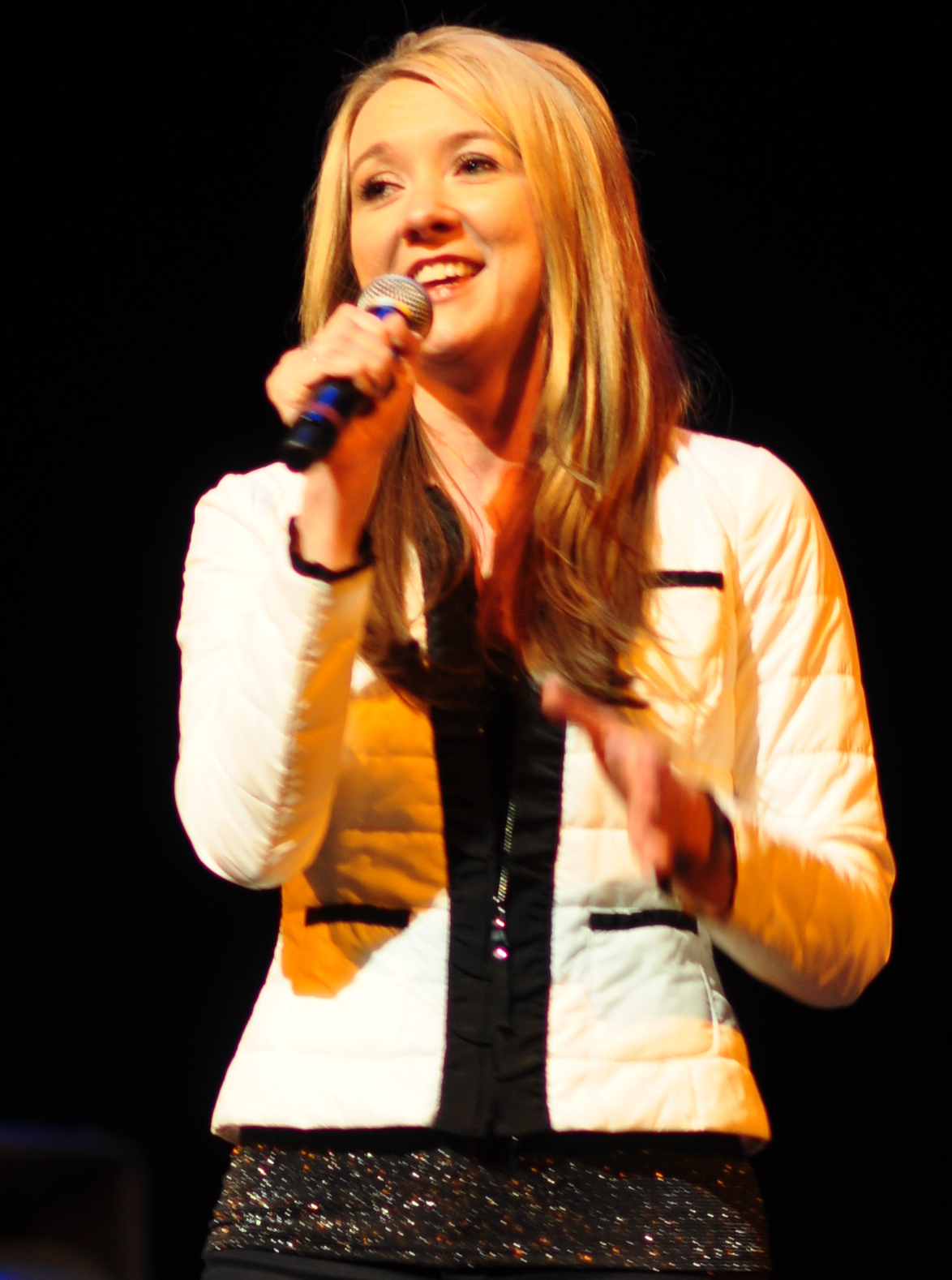

Member of the Washington House of Representatives from the 25th district
- In office January 12, 2015 – January 14, 2019
- Preceded by: Dawn Morrell
- Succeeded by: Kelly Chambers

Personal details
- Born: September 25, 1990 (age 36) Puyallup, Washington
- Party: Republican
- Education: University of Washington (BA); Pepperdine Graziadio Business School (MBA)
- Website: Legislative website

Melanie A. Stambaugh (born September 25, 1990) is an American businesswoman and politician of the Republican party. At 24 years old, she became the youngest woman elected to the Washington State Legislature since 1936, when she defeated Democratic Representative Dawn Morrell for a seat in the Washington House of Representatives in 2014. She gave the Washington State Republican Party one of gains in the House in the 2014 election. She was the youngest member of the legislative chamber upon being sworn in.

== Career ==
Stambaugh was re-elected to the Washington House of Representatives in 2016. Stambaugh was charged with 44 ethics violations for posting publicly-available multimedia content paid for by taxpayers to her campaign Facebook page. Ultimately, the Legislative Ethics Board fined her $5,000.

On February 17, 2018, Stambaugh announced her retirement from the Washington State Legislature, stating that she would not run for re-election later that year.

== Personal life ==
Stambaugh was the 2009 Daffodil Queen in Pierce County, Washington, which became a point of contention during her 2014 campaign. At the time, she was a senior at Emerald Ridge High School in South Hill.
