= Bradley Lake Park =

Park in Washington, United States

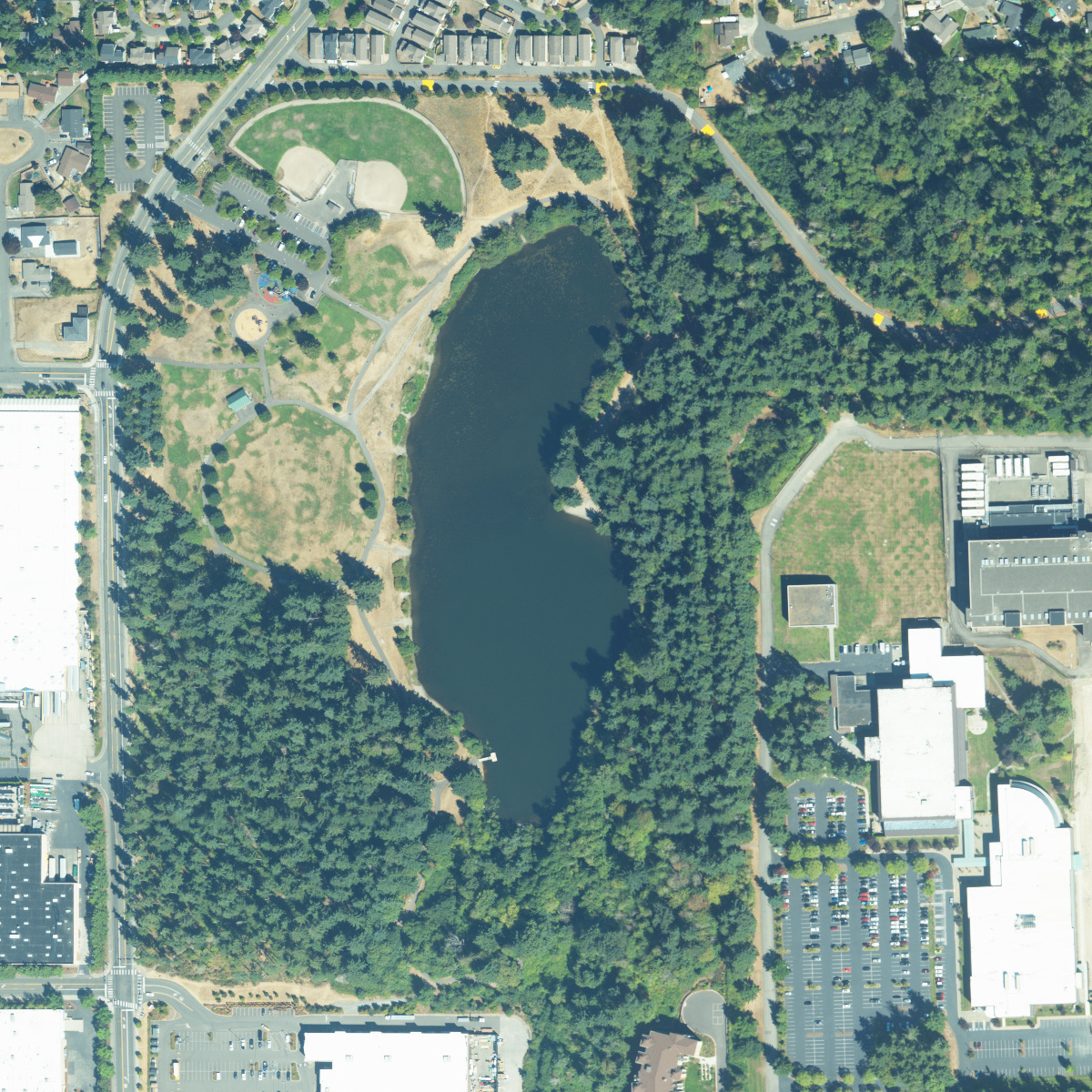
- Aerial view of Park in August 2023
- Interactive map of Park location
- Type: public
- Location: South Hill
- Coordinates: 47°09′41″N 122°17′01″W
- Area: 59 acres (23.88 ha)
- Created: 1997
- Website: cityofpuyallup.org

Bradley Lake Park is a public park located in Puyallup, Washington. The park was developed and opened shortly after being acquired by the city via voter approved bond in 1997. Bradley Lake Park consists of 59-acres park site, including a 12-acre lake.

== Overview ==
The park is named after the land's former owner, Mr. Ward Bradley. The lake was originally a peat bog, and was created after 30 years of peat farming. It is estimated that three to four hundred thousand yards of peat were removed during this time span. The lake was formed after the peat was removed and a dam was constructed on the north end of the former bog.
