= Puyallup Herald =

Weekly newspaper in Puyallup, Washington

- Type: Weekly newspaper
- Owner: McClatchy
- Founded: 1886
- Language: English
- City: Puyallup, Washington
- Circulation: 27,000 (as of 2022)
- Sister newspapers: The News Tribune
- ISSN: 0192-1401
- OCLC number: 5019614
- Website: thenewstribune.com/news/local/community/puyallup-herald/

The Puyallup Herald is a weekly newspaper in Puyallup, Washington, covering local news, sports, business and community events. Published once a week on Thursday, The Herald provides news to Puyallup, South Hill, Bonney Lake, Sumner, and Edgewood. The newspaper is owned by McClatchy, and is published through The News Tribune.

== History ==
The paper was founded as the Commerce in Tacoma, Washington, in 1886 and soon moved to Puyallup. It was renamed The Puyallup Independent in 1898 and merged with The Sumner Herald in 1903, resulting in the Puyallup Valley Tribune. Editor and publisher Robert L. Montgomery was courted to run for governor of Washington in the 1920 Washington gubernatorial election, but declined. He continued to run the Tribune until his death in 1936. At that time the paper was inherited by his son Tom Montgomery.

In May 1965, a group of 10 businessmen formed the Puyallup Publishing Co. and founded the Pierce County Herald. The company was headed by Frank Franich. In September 1965, they acquired the Parkland Times-Journal from Jack Brown and absorbed it into the Herald. In July 1966, the company acquired the Puyallup Valley Tribune from Tom Montgomery and also merged it into the Herald.

In 1983, Puyallup Publishing Co., under the direction of remaining owners Frank Franich and Denny Elvins, sold the Pierce County Herald to the Baker family owned Tribune Publishing Co., publisher of The News Tribune in Tacoma. The Herald was managed by a subsidiary called Herald Publishing Co., operated by Frank's brother Paul Franich and Norm Schieke. In 1986, the Baker family sold their two newspapers to McClatchy Newspapers. On August 5, 1999, the paper was renamed to The Puyallup Herald. Another unrelated paper published under the same name from 1911 to 1930.
