= Karshner Museum =

Museum in Puyallup, Washington, United States

- Location of Karshner Museum
- Location: 309 4th Street NE, Puyallup, Washington
- Coordinates: 47.193478°N 122.289626°W
- Type: Natural history museum, Children's museum, Native American museum
- Founder: Paul H. Karshner
- Coordinator: Karen Higgins
- Owner: Puyallup School District
- Website: karctr.puyallupsd.org

The Karshner Museum, also known as Paul H. Karshner Memorial Museum and the Karshner Museum Center for Culture & Arts, is a natural history museum located at 309 4th Street NE, Puyallup, Washington. It is one of the only museums owned by a local school district.

== History ==
The museum was founded in 1930 by Dr Warner M. Karshner and his wife in honor of their son, Paul Hibbert Karshner, who died of polio. Paul was only 17 years of age, just beginning his senior year at Puyallup High School. It initially consisted of Karshner's private collection of 10,000 items including Native American artifacts. It has grown to include items from South Pacific islands as well as a Dale Chihuly glass exhibit.

The museum is managed by the Puyallup School District and is an active part of the curriculum through fifth grade. It is open during school hours and during monthly "Family Days" on weekends.

== Repatriation ==
In 2009, the museum helped repatriate funerary items from its collections to the Yakama Nation, Confederated Tribes of the Colville Reservation, Washington and the Wanapum Band.
