= Killian Larson =

American basketball player (born 1991)

Personal information
- Born: February 21, 1991 (age 35) Puyallup, Washington, U.S.
- Listed height: 6 ft 9 in (2.06 m)
- Listed weight: 250 lb (113 kg)

Career information
- High school: Puyallup (Puyallup, Washington)
- College: Dominican (2009–2011); Grand Canyon (2012–2014)
- NBA draft: 2014: undrafted
- Playing career: 2014–2017
- Position: Center
- Number: 12

Career history
- 2014: Lukoil Academic
- 2014–2015: Wilki Morskie Szczecin
- 2015: Salon Vilpas
- 2015–2016: Liège
- 2016–2017: Saint-Chamond

Career highlights
- First-team All-WAC (2014)

Killian Larson (born February 21, 1991) is an American retired basketball player. He competed at the collegiate level with the Grand Canyon Antelopes men's basketball team and finished his senior season averaging the most rebounds per game in all of NCAA Division I and was tied for third nationally with 21 double-doubles. Larson also attended Dominican University of California, where he played for the basketball team and achieved prolific status.

== High school career ==
Larson attended Puyallup High School in Pierce County, Washington. While playing with the school's team, he was named South Puget Sound League (SPSL) Most Valuable Player in 2009, and was also named First Team All-Area. Upon the completion of his high school career, Larson was given a composite grade of two stars. He was offered a spot on the Dominican University basketball team roster, and finally enrolled with the program. Shortly before April 2009, Larson was invited to participate in the Northwest Shootout, an event featuring the top high school senior talent from Oregon and Washington.

== Collegiate career ==
=== Freshman ===
Larson debuted with the Dominican men's basketball team at the collegiate level with 10 points, a team-high 9 rebounds and 2 blocks, and 1 assist in an exhibition contest vs. Pacific Union College. Larson also helped the team finish with a 25-point victory. Following the game, head coach Bret Tovani commented on Larson's debut, "I really liked the way the young guys stepped up tonight to the level of [collegiate] play. We have a lot to look forward to. Now that this is behind us it's time to focus on our next challenge."

GCU

Larson made his first official appearance in a regular season game against San Francisco, a Division I program. He added 4 points, 2 rebounds, and 5 personal fouls. Larson was given a third straight start by Bret Tovani, along with several other incoming freshmen on the team.

On November 21, 2009, Larson scored double-digits for his third straight game against Western Washington, with 10 points and 6 rebounds. Larson entered the game in place of Austin Bryan, who led the game with 28 points before being fouled out. Larson contributed to the team's first regular season victory against Western Oregon with 9 points, 5 rebounds, and 1 block.

Larson finally broke the 10-point barrier on December 11, 2009, recording 12 points, 5 rebounds, and 3 turnovers against the Division I's Santa Clara. He scored a season-low zero points on December 19, 2009 against Holy Names University, with 0-for-6 shooting and five personal fouls.

On January 18, 2010, Larson posted a career-high 10 rebounds against Dixie State University and scored nine more points. During the game, he converted on a three-point play with under one minute remaining in the final quarter, widely considered his most impactful offensive display in his first year. More than one month later, Larson led the team in scoring for the first time in his career against Notre Dame de Namur, with 13 total points through the four quarters. Larson again broke his season-high scoring value vs. Dixie State with 17 points and 7 rebounds. This would become his highest scoring game in his freshman season with Dominican.

NCAA Awards & Honors

WAC All-Conference First Team 2014

Dr. Pepper Classic All-Tournament Team 2014

NCAA DII Awards & Honors Award
