= South Hill, Washington =

- Census-designated place
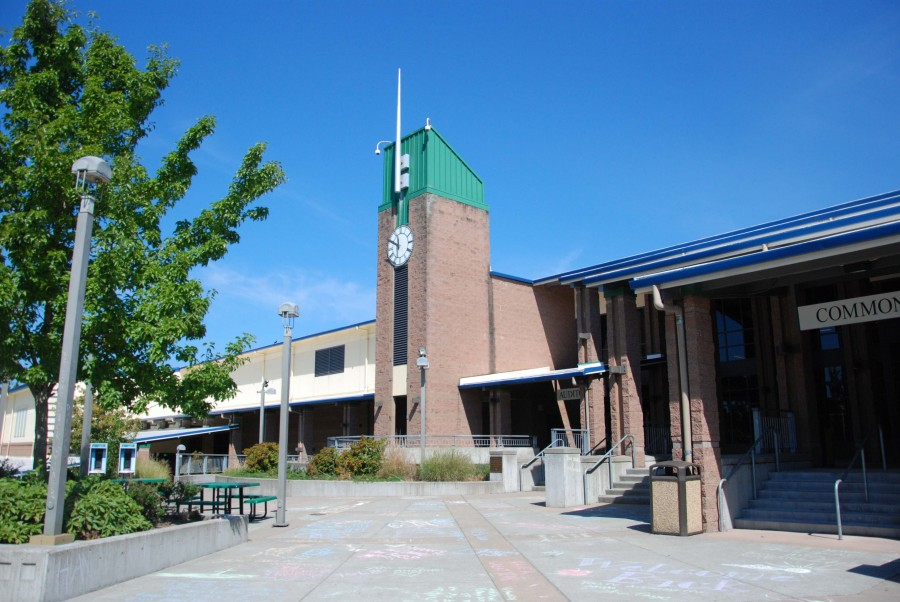
- Emerald Ridge High School
- Interactive map of South Hill, Washington
- Location within Washington (state) Location within the United States
- Coordinates: 47°7′16″N 122°16′20″W
- Country: United States
- State: Washington
- County: Pierce

Area
  - Total: 18.1 sq mi (46.8 km^{2})
  - Land: 18.0 sq mi (46.6 km^{2})
  - Water: 0.077 sq mi (0.2 km^{2})
- Elevation: 541 ft (165 m)

Population (2020)
  - Total: 64,708
  - Density: 3,600/sq mi (1,390/km^{2})
- Time zone: UTC-8 (Pacific (PST))
  - Summer (DST): UTC-7 (PDT)
- ZIP Codes: 98373-98375
- Area code: 253, 360, 564
- FIPS code: 53-65922
- GNIS feature ID: 2408766

South Hill is a census-designated place (CDP) in Pierce County, Washington, United States. The population was 64,708 at the 2020 census. Located immediately south of Puyallup, the area primarily consists of suburban housing and shopping with several retail shopping centers, residential neighborhoods, and apartment complexes throughout. Because South Hill is unincorporated, its addresses are part of the Puyallup "postal city" or ZCTA.

The area was first settled in the 1880s after a military road was built through the area in the 1850s. Several logging camps, farms, and hunting grounds sprouted up as the area was settled. It also was the main route to the towns of Kapowsin and Eatonville. Population growth was slow until after World War II, when roads improved and people could commute to nearby Tacoma, Fort Lewis, and Seattle.

Most commercial areas are located along the main thoroughfare, Meridian Avenue (State Route 161). Major neighborhoods include Manorwood, Sunrise (Sunrise Master Association), Lipoma Firs, Silvercreek, and Gem Heights. There are also a few popular public parks: Bradley Lake Park, South Hill Community Park/Nathan Chapman Memorial Trail and Wildwood Park.

== History ==
Major events:

- 1853- Longmire-Biles wagon train crosses South Hill
- 1870- South Hill inhabited
- 1895- Firgrove School District is established
- 1905- Main route through South Hill named Ball-Wood Road
- 1909- Tacoma-Puyallup Interurban Line rail operates through South Hill
- 1930- SagMiller Airstrip opens
- 1944- Thun Field opens (Pierce County Airport today), although John Thun doesn't buy it until 1949
- 1945- Japan uses balloon bomb system to bomb mainland USA in World War II, and two of the bombs landed in South Hill
- 1950- Firgrove School District consolidates with Puyallup School District
- 1972- State Route 512 is completed
- 1986- EPA places Pierce County Landfill in South Hill on the National Priorities List
- 1998- Proposal for South Hill's incorporation into Southview is defeated by voters

== Geography ==
The community's name describes its location above the south side of the Puyallup River valley. This also contrasts with the nearby Edgewood and Milton areas, which are known informally as North Hill.

According to the United States Census Bureau, the CDP has a total area of 18.1 square miles (46.8 km^{2}), of which, 18.0 square miles (46.6 km^{2}) of it is land and 0.1 square miles (0.2 km^{2}) of it (0.39%) is water.

=== Climate ===
Climate data for McMillin Reservoir, Washington, 1991–2020 normals, extremes 1941–present
Month	Jan	Feb	Mar	Apr	May	Jun	Jul	Aug	Sep	Oct	Nov	Dec	Year
Record high °F (°C)	66 (19)	67 (19)	79 (26)	84 (29)	92 (33)	99 (37)	102 (39)	100 (38)	95 (35)	86 (30)	73 (23)	66 (19)	102 (39)
Mean maximum °F (°C)	57.5 (14.2)	58.3 (14.6)	65.3 (18.5)	72.8 (22.7)	81.0 (27.2)	84.3 (29.1)	89.8 (32.1)	88.8 (31.6)	81.8 (27.7)	71.6 (22.0)	61.5 (16.4)	57.1 (13.9)	92.1 (33.4)
Mean daily maximum °F (°C)	46.1 (7.8)	48.0 (8.9)	52.4 (11.3)	57.3 (14.1)	64.3 (17.9)	69.0 (20.6)	75.7 (24.3)	76.5 (24.7)	69.6 (20.9)	59.1 (15.1)	50.3 (10.2)	45.0 (7.2)	59.4 (15.2)
Daily mean °F (°C)	39.7 (4.3)	40.6 (4.8)	44.0 (6.7)	48.0 (8.9)	54.4 (12.4)	59.0 (15.0)	64.0 (17.8)	64.5 (18.1)	58.9 (14.9)	50.4 (10.2)	43.2 (6.2)	39.0 (3.9)	50.5 (10.3)
Mean daily minimum °F (°C)	33.3 (0.7)	33.1 (0.6)	35.7 (2.1)	38.7 (3.7)	44.5 (6.9)	49.0 (9.4)	52.4 (11.3)	52.6 (11.4)	48.2 (9.0)	41.7 (5.4)	36.1 (2.3)	32.9 (0.5)	41.5 (5.3)
Mean minimum °F (°C)	22.5 (−5.3)	22.9 (−5.1)	27.2 (−2.7)	30.7 (−0.7)	36.0 (2.2)	42.5 (5.8)	45.9 (7.7)	46.0 (7.8)	39.7 (4.3)	31.2 (−0.4)	24.7 (−4.1)	21.7 (−5.7)	17.3 (−8.2)
Record low °F (°C)	0 (−18)	3 (−16)	9 (−13)	23 (−5)	26 (−3)	32 (0)	36 (2)	37 (3)	29 (−2)	21 (−6)	0 (−18)	−1 (−18)	−1 (−18)
Average precipitation inches (mm)	6.12 (155)	4.33 (110)	4.80 (122)	3.90 (99)	2.97 (75)	2.28 (58)	0.92 (23)	0.90 (23)	1.78 (45)	4.08 (104)	7.06 (179)	5.99 (152)	45.13 (1,146)
Average snowfall inches (cm)	1.5 (3.8)	0.5 (1.3)	0.6 (1.5)	0.0 (0.0)	0.0 (0.0)	0.0 (0.0)	0.0 (0.0)	0.0 (0.0)	0.0 (0.0)	0.0 (0.0)	1.5 (3.8)	1.5 (3.8)	5.6 (14)
Average precipitation days (≥ 0.01 in)	20.0	15.2	19.6	16.3	13.1	10.5	5.0	4.5	7.9	14.6	19.4	20.2	166.3
Average snowy days (≥ 0.1 in)	1.0	0.4	0.5	0.0	0.0	0.0	0.0	0.0	0.0	0.0	0.5	1.1	3.5
Source: NOAA

== Demographics ==
Historical population
Census	Pop.	Note	%±
1980	7,035		—
1990	12,963		84.3%
2000	31,623		143.9%
2010	52,431		65.8%
2020	64,708		23.4%
U.S. Decennial Census

=== 2020 census ===
As of the 2020 census, South Hill had a population of 64,708. The median age was 35.5 years. 26.7% of residents were under the age of 18 and 11.6% of residents were 65 years of age or older. For every 100 females there were 97.6 males, and for every 100 females age 18 and over there were 94.5 males age 18 and over.

99.9% of residents lived in urban areas, while 0.1% lived in rural areas.

There were 21,981 households in South Hill, of which 40.3% had children under the age of 18 living in them. Of all households, 57.8% were married-couple households, 13.6% were households with a male householder and no spouse or partner present, and 20.7% were households with a female householder and no spouse or partner present. About 16.7% of all households were made up of individuals and 6.4% had someone living alone who was 65 years of age or older.

There were 22,634 housing units, of which 2.9% were vacant. The homeowner vacancy rate was 0.6% and the rental vacancy rate was 4.3%.

Racial composition as of the 2020 census
Race	Number	Percent
White	42,556	65.8%
Black or African American	3,562	5.5%
American Indian and Alaska Native	752	1.2%
Asian	4,537	7.0%
Native Hawaiian and Other Pacific Islander	1,289	2.0%
Some other race	3,397	5.2%
Two or more races	8,615	13.3%
Hispanic or Latino (of any race)	8,041	12.4%

=== 2010 census ===
As of the census of 2010, there were 52,431 people, 17,962 households, and 13,990 families residing in the CDP. There were 19,081 housing. The racial makeup of the CDP was 78.2% White, 4.3% African American, 1.0% Native American, 6.0% Asian, 1.1% Pacific Islander, 3.1% from other races, and 6.5% from two or more races. Hispanic or Latino of any race were 8.5% of the population.

There were 17,962 households, out of which 45.7% had children under the age of 18 living with them, 60.6% were married couples living together, 11.7% had a female householder with no husband present, and 22.1% were non-families. 16.1% of all households were made up of individuals, and 4.9% had someone living alone who was 65 years of age or older. The average household size was 2.92 and the average family size was 3.25.

In the CDP, the age distribution of the population shows 29.7% under the age of 18, 70.3% over the age of 18, and 7.7% who were 65 years of age or older. The median age was 33.6 years.

=== 2000 census ===
As of the census of 2000, there were 31,623 people, 10,929 households, and 8,721 families residing in the CDP. The population density was 1,756.3 people per square mile (677.9/km^{2}). There were 11,398 housing units at an average density of 633.0/sq mi (244.4/km^{2}). The racial makeup of the CDP was 87.41% White, 2.42% African American, 0.94% Native American, 3.36% Asian, 0.49% Pacific Islander, 1.45% from other races, and 3.94% from two or more races. Hispanic or Latino of any race were 4.13% of the population.

There were 10,929 households, out of which 45.7% had children under the age of 18 living with them, 65.3% were married couples living together, 9.8% had a female householder with no husband present, and 20.2% were non-families. 15.1% of all households were made up of individuals, and 4.4% had someone living alone who was 65 years of age or older. The average household size was 2.89 and the average family size was 3.20.

In the CDP, the age distribution of the population shows 31.3% under the age of 18, 7.6% from 18 to 24, 33.9% from 25 to 44, 20.4% from 45 to 64, and 6.9% who were 65 years of age or older. The median age was 33 years. For every 100 females, there were 97.4 males. For every 100 females age 18 and over, there were 93.8 males.

The median income for a household in the CDP was $60,524, and the median income for a family was $64,544. Males had a median income of $45,637 versus $30,306 for females. The per capita income for the CDP was $22,700. About 2.6% of families and 4.2% of the population were below the poverty line, including 4.6% of those under age 18 and 3.2% of those age 65 or over.

== Education ==
The Puyallup School District is the public school district for South Hill. Governor John R. Rogers High School and Emerald Ridge High School are both located in South Hill, as well as three junior high schools: Glacier View Junior High, Stahl Junior High, and Ballou Junior High, and several elementary schools. Elementary schools include Hunt Elementary, Edgerton Elementary, Carson Elementary, Pope Elementary, Brouillet Elementary, Firgrove Elementary, Zeiger Elementary, Ridgecrest Elementary, and Dessie F. Evans Elementary.

== Parks and recreation ==
South Hill is home to three major parks owned and operated by Pierce County. Heritage Recreation Center is a 40-acre sports complex with baseball fields, soccer fields, and multi-purpose fields located between Rogers High School and Zeiger Elementary School.

South Hill Community Park is a 40-acre park with a playground, two soccer fields, and both the South Hill Loop Trail and the Nathan Chapman Memorial Trail, a 1.6 mile paved pathway through forest and wetlands that connects the park to the Heritage Recreation Center. According to the Pierce County website, the Nathan Chapman Memorial Trail was named after Sgt. Nathan Chapman, a South Hill resident and the first American soldier to die in the war in Afghanistan.

Meridian Habitat Park & Community Center is a 36-acre park located on State Route 161. The site was previously an amphitheatre owned by Champion Center Church and home to the annual Jesus of Nazareth passion play from 1982 to 2006. The church sold the amphitheatre to Pierce County for $6.9 million in 2006, but the stage caught fire and was destroyed by an electric fire in 2007.

== Notable people ==
- Nathan Chapman, first American soldier to die in the war in Afghanistan
- Brandon Gibson, football and basketball player at Washington State University.
- Megan Jendrick, two-time Olympic gold medalist swimmer
- Melanie Stambaugh, elected to the Washington state House of Representatives in November 2014
