= Gail Bruce =

American football player (1923–1998)

- Bruce in 1949

No. 54
- Positions: Defensive end, end

Personal information
- Born: September 29, 1923; Puyallup, Washington, U.S.
- Died: August 23, 1998 (aged 74); Santa Maria, California, U.S.
- Listed height: 6 ft 1 in (1.85 m)
- Listed weight: 206 lb (93 kg)

Career information
- High school: Puyallup
- College: Washington (1942, 1945–1947)
- NFL draft: 1946: 30th round, 283rd overall pick

Career history
- San Francisco 49ers (1948–1951)

Career NFL/AAFC statistics
- Receptions: 7
- Receiving yards: 68
- Interceptions: 2
- Stats at Pro Football Reference

Gail Robert Bruce (September 29, 1923 – August 23, 1998) was an American professional football defensive end who played four seasons with the San Francisco 49ers of the All-America Football Conference (AAFC) and National Football League (NFL). He was selected by the Pittsburgh Steelers in the 30th round of the 1946 NFL draft. He played college football at the University of Washington.

== Early life and college ==
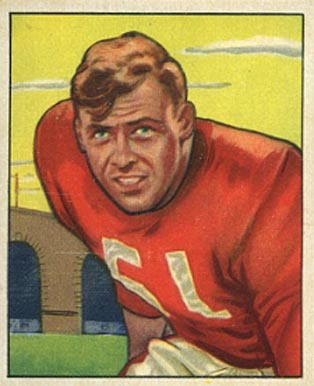
Bruce on a 1950 Bowman football card.

Gail Robert Bruce was born on September 29, 1923, in Puyallup, Washington. He attended Puyallup High School in Puyallup.

Bruce was a member of the Washington Huskies of the University of Washington in 1942. He then served in the United States Marine Corps during World War II. After his stint in the Marines, he was a three-year letterman for the Huskies from 1945 to 1947.

== Professional career ==
Bruce was selected by the Pittsburgh Steelers in the 30th round, with the 283rd overall pick, of the 1946 NFL draft.

He signed with the San Francisco 49ers of the All-America Football Conference in 1948. He played in all 14 games for the 49ers in 1948, catching five passes for 49 yards. Bruce appeared in 12 games, starting four, during the 1949 season, totaling one reception for nine yards and one interception. He also played in two playoff games that year, catching one pass for four yards. Bruce started all 12 games for the 49ers during their first season in the NFL in 1950, recording one reception for ten yards and one interception. The 49ers finished the year with a 3–9 record. He started all 12 games for the second straight year in 1951, recovering two fumbles and scoring one extra point. The team finished the season with a 7–4–1 record. Bruce suffered a career-ending ankle injury in September 1952 before the start of the 1952 season.

== Personal life ==
In 1953, Bruce started working for Lucky Lager. He later started his own company called the All-American Beverage Co. He also spent time as the director of the Santa Maria Valley YMCA. He died on August 23, 1998, in Santa Maria, California.
