= Puyallup School District =

School district in Washington, United States

Location
- Puyallup, Pierce County, Washington; United States

District information
- Type: Public
- Motto: A Tradition of Excellence
- Grades: Kindergarten through 12th grade
- Superintendent: Dr. John Polm
- Asst. superintendent(s): Dr. Vince Pecchia (Assistant Superintendent for Equity and Instructional Leadership) Corine Pennington (Assistant Superintendent for Business and Support Services) Amie Brandmire (Assistant Superintendent for Human Resources and Employee Relations) Mario Casello (Assistant Superintendent for Operations)
- School board: Puyallup School Board (elected)
- NCES District ID: 5306960

Students and staff
- Students: 22,534
- Faculty: 1,560 certificated staff, 1,450 classified staff, 570 substitute personnel

Other information
- Website: www.puyallupsd.org

Puyallup School District No. 3 is a school district that supports the city of Puyallup, Washington, United States, and its surrounding areas. It was the third school district formed in the state of Washington. It is the 8th largest school district in Washington. The district has 22 elementary schools, seven junior high schools, three senior high schools and an alternative school, which together serve over 22,534 students. The district employs more than 1,560 certificated, 1,450 classified staff, and 570 substitute personnel.

The current superintendent of the Puyallup School District is Dr. John Polm, who became the superintendent in July 2020 after the retirement of his predecessor, Dr. Tim Yeomans.

== History ==
The first school in the district was Fort Maloney. It was originally used by soldiers as a storehouse, but later became known as the "Blockhouse" School, where one of its occupants from the John Carson family, Emma Carson, began teaching in 1861.

Soon, as more settlers came west, more small, makeshift schools were built for the children who fared poorly in winter months. After teaching and learning in these makeshift schools, it came to the people's attention that others were less inclined to settle in Puyallup because of the lack of proper schooling facilities. They built Central School in response to a vote in 1885. Because of the new school, in addition to other benefits the Puyallup area had to offer, more settlers began to come to Puyallup.

The school district has closed down two elementary schools so far, Hilltop and Riverside. Hilltop Elementary was acquired during the consolidation of Edgemont SD with Puyallup in 1967. It was closed due to decreasing enrollment numbers and unsustainability. The remaining Hilltop students were transferred to Mountain View and Northwood. Riverside Elementary was acquired during the consolidation of Riverside SD with Puyallup in 1962. It was closed due to its position on a floodplain, decreasing enrollment numbers, and unsustainability. The remaining Riverside students were transferred to Waller Road and Karshner. Both schools were closed together right before the 2007-2008 school year. Riverside was later leased to the Puget Sound Educational Service District for its ReLife program; of which the lease was considered successful interim. The Puyallup school board later declared the property to be a "surplus" and authorized the district to seek a buyer. The former school was sold to the Washington Premier Football Club in 2018.

In 2015, the district was sued for alleged negligence in a sexual abuse case by a student at Ridgecrest Elementary during the 2013 school year. The district settled the suit, paying $3.75 million to the plaintiffs.

In 2018, the beginning of school was delayed due to all teachers in the district striking for several days in response to neighboring districts receiving much higher raises than those in Puyallup. In preparation for the strike, the regular school board meeting prior to the start of school was packed with teachers looking for answers and good news from district leadership. After days of delayed school and teachers on the picket lines, the strike came to an end and school resumed when the Puyallup Education Association passed an average 11% raise, making the pay range for teachers $52,000-100,000 annually.

In 2019, several victims of abuse by a former Kalles Junior High teacher and coach stepped forward about what they experienced as students between 1991 and 2004. The abuser, Tim Paulsen, had a great relationship with school administrators and colleagues, making him unassuming to them as someone who could be a child predator. He had inappropriate relations with his students and athletes. The lawsuit resulted in a $7.5 million settlement to be paid by the district. Paulsen could not be criminally charged for the incidents because of the statute of limitations.

== Geography ==
The school district includes the majority of Puyallup as well as most of Edgewood, North Puyallup, South Hill, and Waller. It also includes portions of Alderton, Fife, Graham, Summit, Summit View, and Sumner.

== Demographics ==
The following is based on the 2017-2018 and 2018-2019 school years:

By diversity:

- 13.2% of students were learning English.
- 29.3% of students were on free or reduced lunch.

By race/ethnicity:

- 56.3% White
- 17.4% Hispanic/Latino
- 12.7% two or more races
- 5.8% Asian
- 5% Black
- 1.9% Native Hawaiian or other Pacific Islander
- 1% American Indian or Alaska Native

By gender:

- 48% female
- 52% male

== Schools ==
The Puyallup School District in addition to its four high schools, seven junior high schools, and 22 elementary schools has a unified Puyallup Digital Learning (PDL) school which facilitates the Puyallup Online Academy (POA) and Puyallup Parent Partnership (P4) programs.

=== High schools ===
Puyallup has four high schools:

Name	Type	Region	Established	2021-22 Enrollment	Mascot	WIAA Classification
Puyallup High School	Comprehensive	III	1910	1,711	Vikings	4A
E.B. Walker High School	Alternative	III	1975	83	Wolves	N/A
Rogers High School	Comprehensive	II	1968	1,724	Rams	4A
Emerald Ridge High School	Comprehensive	I	2000	1,434	Jaguars	4A

High schools in Puyallup cover grades 10-12.

=== Junior high schools ===
Puyallup has seven junior high schools with all serving grades 7-9 except Edgemont, which serves grades 6-9.

Name	Region	Established	2021-22 Enrollment	Mascot	Notes
Charles H. Aylen	III	1962	692	Falcons	Formerly "West Junior High School" in reference to its western location in the original bounds of the City of Puyallup. Renamed to Charles H. Aylen JH in 1970 after Ballou JH opened. Rebuilt in 2004.
Frank H. Ballou	II	1970	875	Bruins	Opened adjacent to Firgrove Elementary. Classroom addition completed in 2021.
Edgemont	III	1938	506	Eagles	Acquired when Edgemont School District consolidated with Puyallup School District in 1967.
Dr. Vitt P. Ferrucci	I	1982	814	Cougars	PAGE host school for Region I starting 2019-2020. Opened adjacent to Pierce College Puyallup. Currently being expanded in a $25.7 million project.
Glacier View	I	2008	823	Avalanche	Opened adjacent to Emerald Ridge HS.
Eileen B. Kalles	III	1956	817	Tyees	Formerly "East Junior High School" in reference to its eastern location in the original bounds of the City of Puyallup. Renamed to Eileen B. Kalles JH in 1970 after Ballou JH opened. Rebuilt in 2004. Originally the only Puyallup Accelerated and Gifted Education (PAGE) host school in the district, serving all regions, until 2019-2020 when it became host to only Region III.
Doris M. Stahl	II	1993	897	Storm	PAGE host school for Region II starting 2019-2020. Classroom addition completed in 2021.

Junior high schools in Puyallup serve grades 7-9.

=== Elementary schools ===
Puyallup has 22 elementary schools:

Name	Region	Established	2021-22 Enrollment	Mascot	Notes
Frank B. Brouillet	II	1990	552	Bobcats	
Emma L. Carson	II	2007	686	Coyotes	
Dessie F. Evans	II	2019	899	Owls	Newest school in the district. Named after longtime Puyallup schoolteacher Dessie Evans. Built as relief school for Firgrove and Zeiger elementary schools after the area experienced tremendous growth, with both of these schools holding close to 800 students each.
G.W. Edgerton	I	2007	680	Wolves	
Firgrove	II	1930	580	Hawks	Acquired when Firgrove School consolidated with Puyallup School District in the 1950s. The original brick building of the 1930s school was a part of the expanded campus before it was torn down in 2021 alongside the predecessor buildings. The replacement was completed in 2019.
Fruitland	III	1965	558	Rams	
Warren D. Hunt	I	1990	709	Highlanders	Classroom addition completed in 2017.
Paul H. Karshner	III	1953	375	Tigers	Shares namesake with the Karshner Museum for Arts & Culture.
Maplewood	III	1891	367	Mustangs	
Ezra M. Meeker	III	1890	355	Eagles	Named after famed pioneer Ezra Meeker who founded the City of Puyallup.
Mountain View	III	1966	291	Mustangs	Acquired when Edgemont School District consolidated with Puyallup School District in 1967.
Northwood	III	1974	589	Knights	Acquired when Edgemont School District consolidated with Puyallup School District in 1967. Building replaced in 2019.
Florence L. Pope	I	1981	625	Thunderbirds	Classroom addition and remodel completed in 2020.
Ridgecrest	I	1981	445	Raiders	
Shaw Road	I	1992	622	Trailblazers	Classroom addition completed in 2019.
F.R. Spinning	III	1891	287	Vikings	
J.P. Stewart	III	1923	309	Stars	
Sunrise	I	1973	651	Superstars	Building replaced in 2019.
Waller Road	III	1913	311	Roadrunners	
Wildwood Park	I	1966	379	Wildcats	
Woodland	II	1884	554	Eagles	Oldest continuing school in the Puyallup School District.
Edward Zeiger	II	1996	502	Explorers	

Elementary schools in Puyallup serve grades K-6.

== See also ==
- Karshner Museum
