= Chris Egan (tennis) =

American tennis player and sports anchor

Chris Egan was one of the top men's tennis players in the Northwest Conference, playing all four years at Pacific Lutheran Universityin Parkland, Washington. He was the 1995 PLU Man of the Year in sports. He is the 2012 PLU Alumnus of the Year in Sports. Coming to PLU from Puyallup High School in Puyallup, he helped lead the Lutes to four consecutive Northwest Conference titles from 1992 to 1995. During the three years, he played No. 1 or No. 2 singles and represented the school at the 1994 and 1995 NAIA national tournaments.

After beginning his career in the mid 1990s in several small Pacific Northwest media markets, Egan returned to the Seattle area to work for Northwest Cable News as a sports anchor and producer on NorthWest Sports Tonight. He joined the KING 5 sports department as a reporter and anchor in June 2007. Chris Egan has won nine Emmy awards. In 2009 he won an Emmy for Sports Anchoring; in 2010, he received the Edward R. Murrow Award for Sports Story of the Year. In 2016, the Washington state football coaches association presented him with the Silver Helmet Award for his coverage of high school sports. He and his wife, Melanie Egan have three children; he helps coach many of their sports teams.
