= Jamie Reid (swimmer) =

American swimmer (born 1983)

Personal information
- Born: August 10, 1983 (age 43)

Sport
- Sport: Swimming
- College team: Florida
Medal record
Women's swimming
Representing the United States
World Championships (SC)
| Bronze medal – third place | 2000 Athens | 4x100m Medley |
Pan American Games
| Gold medal – first place | 2003 S Domingo | 200m Backstroke |

Jamie Reid (born August 10, 1983) is a female backstroke swimmer from the United States, who won the gold medal in the women's 100m backstroke event at the 2003 Pan American Games. She is a native of Balboa, Panama and competed for Puyallup Aquatic Club in Puyallup, Washington and Highlander Aquatic Club in Orlando, Florida.

== Early life and education ==
Born in Panama, Reid's family moved to Seattle, Washington when she was seven due to unrest in the country. A graduate of Puyallup High School, Reid attended the University of Florida where she was a member of the swimming and diving team.
