= Governor John R. Rogers High School =

Rogers High School
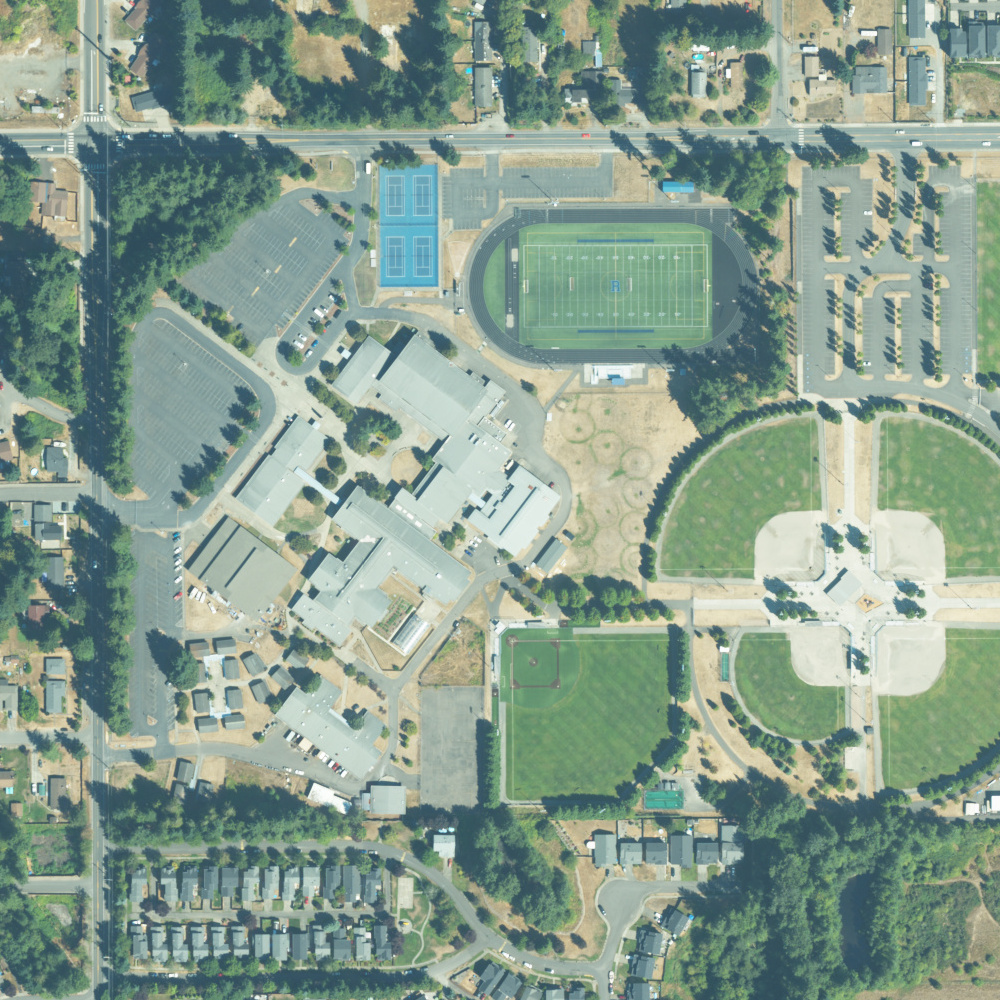
- Aerial view of School in August 2023

Location
- Interactive map of School location
- 12801 86th Avenue East; Puyallup, Washington 98373; United States; 47°08′18″N 122°18′45″W

Information
- Type: Public secondary
- Motto: Non scholae, sed vitae
- Established: 1968; 58 years ago
- School district: Puyallup School District
- NCES School ID: 530696001028
- Teaching staff: 73.90 (FTE)
- Grades: 10–12
- Enrollment: 1,750 (2023-2024)
- Student to teacher ratio: 23.68
- Campus: Suburban
- Colors: Columbia blue and navy
- Mascot: Ram
- Website: rhs.puyallupsd.org

Governor John R. Rogers High School is a high school in the Puyallup School District of Washington, United States. Commonly referred to as "Rogers" or "RHS," the high school is named after former Washington State governor John Rankin Rogers. It was first opened in 1968.

== Academics ==
Between the three comprehensive high schools in the district, Rogers ranks second in test scores. In the 2009–2010 school year, 10th graders showed 84.1% competency in Reading, 45.7% in Math, 93.4% in Writing and 43.0% in Science on the High School Proficiency Exam (HSPE).

== Awards ==
RHS students have won many state awards from the Washington Journalism Education Association and the Washington State Music Teachers Association, and national awards from the Journalism Education Association.

== Notable alumni ==
- John Albert – professional Mixed Martial Artist, formerly competing in the UFC
- Davey Armstrong – Olympic boxer
- Brent Barnes – Washington State Wrestling Coaches Hall of Fame with Lake Stevens High School
- Sarah Butler – actress
- Nick Harmer – Bass player, Death Cab for Cutie
- Logan Ice – baseball player
- Ronald J. Shurer - recipient of the Medal of Honor
