= The News Tribune =

Main daily newspaper of Tacoma, Washington

- Front page of July 1, 2017
- Type: Daily newspaper
- Format: Broadsheet
- Owner: The McClatchy Company
- Founder(s): R. F. Radebaugh; H.C. Patrick
- Editor: Stephanie Pedersen
- Founded: 1880 (as The Ledger)
- Headquarters: 1950 South State Street; Tacoma, Washington; 98405
- Circulation: 5,000 Digital Subscribers; 30,945 Daily; 37,255 Sunday (as of 2020)
- ISSN: 1073-5860
- Website: thenewstribune.com

The News Tribune is an American newspaper based in Tacoma, Washington. It is the second-largest daily newspaper in the state of Washington with a weekday circulation of 30,945 in 2020. With origins dating back to 1883, the newspaper was established under its current form in 1918. Locally owned for 73 years by the Baker family, the newspaper was purchased by McClatchy in 1986.

== History ==
In April 1880, Randolph Foster Radebaugh and H.C. Patrick founded the weekly Tacoma Ledger. Their firm was named Radebaugh & Company. Radebaugh previously worked as a reporter at the San Francisco Chronicle and a correspondent for the Cincinnati Commercial. Patrick previously published the San Jose Republican and then the Santa Cruz Courier in California. The two relocated the Courier printing plant to Tacoma and used it to launch The Ledger. In May 1882, Patrick sold out to Radebaugh, who then expanded the paper into a daily.

On August 10, 1881, George W. Mattice first published the Pierce County News. In April 1882, Mattice sold the paper to Mrs. M.L. Money. In May 1882, Patrick sold his stake in the Ledger to Radebaugh. In June 1882, Money sold the News to Patrick, who then renamed the latter to The Weekly Tacoma News and doubled its size. Both papers became dailies in 1883; The Ledger started daily publication on April 7, with the News following on September 25.

Patrick sold the News to George R. Epperson for $5,500 in September 1885, who sold it to a ownership group in February 1886. The principal owners of the News Publishing Co., Richard Roediger and William McIntyre. Thomas E. Scantlin bought an interest in fall 1888 and assumed editorial management.

Radebaugh remained as Ledger editor until 1892, when he sold a half-interest to Nelson Bennett, and then the rest a few months later. Clinton A. Snowden was named general manager. In 1896, Snowden formed a company and bought The Ledger from Nelson. On May 15, 1897, the paper was $70,000 in debt fell into receivership under Major O.B. Hayden, who sold it a month later to C.M. Shultz.

In 1898, McIntyre sold the News to Sidney "Sam" A. Perkins for $18,000. Albert C. Johnson, a writer at The Washington Post, was named editor. A month later Shultz named Perkins business manager of the Ledger. A year later Perkins left the Ledger and Shultz publisher a letter accusing him of corporate sabotage. Shultz sold the paper in December 1899 to ownership group including C. J. Lord, and banker Mark E. Reed acquired it in May 1900. Perkins acquired the Ledger from Reed a month later.

In 1907, the first phase of construction of the Perkins Building was completed and The Ledger and The News moved in. On June 12, 1908, Radebaugh re-entered the market with the debut of The Tacoma Daily Tribune. He underestimated the capital needed to run the newspaper successfully and sold it in 1909 to A.J. Blethen, owner of The Seattle Times. By early 1912, its insolvency had reached $250,000, with John S. Baker as a principal creditor. Coincidentally, a group including Elbert H. Baker, a cousin of John, and his son Frank S. Baker had just sold the Boston Traveler to the Boston Herald; John traveled to his birthplace of Cleveland and convinced Elbert and Frank to explore a purchase of The Tribune, with Frank supporting the idea when he conducted an investigation in Tacoma. The Bakers purchased the paper and its debts, with Frank first appearing as its publisher on October 26.

The Tribune became successful at the expense of The News and the Tacoma Ledger, with Perkins facing about $400,000 in debt by early 1918. Perkins consulted his creditor, who stated that Tacoma's newspaper market was too saturated and suggested a merger with The Tribune, which Perkins discussed with Frank S. Baker when they coincidentally found each other on a train to Cleveland. Subsequent negotiations resulted in Baker acquiring the two papers from Perkins, with Baker merging The News and The Tribune together to form The Tacoma News Tribune, its first issue appearing on June 17, 1918. The Ledger remained a separate Sunday morning paper until 1937.

In 1948, the paper began operating the radio stations KTNT-AM and KTNT-FM, and in 1953 began operating a television station with the same call letters. In 1979, the newspaper adopted the name Tacoma News Tribune. In 1983, its parent company bought the Pierce County Herald in Puyallup. In October 1985, McClatchy Newspapers reached an agreement with the Baker family to purchase the Tribune Publishing Company's newspaper assets from them for an estimated $112 million, with the transaction completed on August 1, 1986; Viacom purchased the remaining assets, including a television franchise and a radio station, at the same time.

As of 2001, the News Tribune was the third largest newspaper in Washington, with a daily circulation of 130,000. The newspaper, alongside sister publication The Olympian, were printed at a plant in Tacoma until February 3, 2019. Since that time, the newspapers have been printed at the facilities of The Columbian in Vancouver, Washington. In March 2024, the newspaper announced it will decrease the number of print editions to three a week.

== Criticism ==
Harriet Hall criticized the News Tribune in Skeptical Inquirer in 2019 for its acceptance of advertisements for health-related products that imitated the presentation of real articles with only a small disclaimer.

== Bibliography ==
- Harvey, Paul W. (1962). Tacoma Headlines: An Account of Tacoma News and Newspapers from 1873 to 1962. Tacoma, Washington: The Tacoma News Tribune. OCLC 2720728.
