= Puyallup High School =

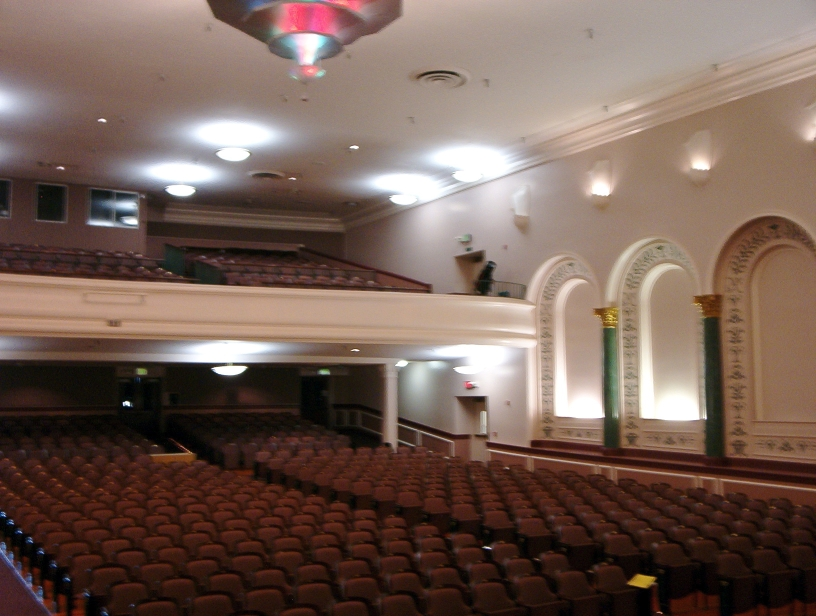
- The Auditorium of the historic Puyallup Senior High School. The school itself was constructed in 1910 as a horseshoe-shaped building until the late 1930s when the auditorium was constructed in the center.

Location
- 105 7th St NW; Puyallup, Washington 98371; United States; 47°11′28″N 122°18′07″W

Information
- Type: Public secondary
- Established: 1890; 136 years ago
- School district: Puyallup School District
- NCES School ID: 530696001038
- Principal: Dave Sunich
- Teaching staff: 74.09 (FTE)
- Grades: 10–12
- Enrollment: 1,815 (2024–2025)
- Student to teacher ratio: 24.50
- Campus: Suburban
- Colors: Purple & gold
- Mascot: Vikings
- Website: phs.puyallupsd.org

Puyallup High School, commonly referred to as PHS, is a high school in the Puyallup School District in Pierce County, Washington.

== History ==
Founded in 1890 as Central High School, the first nine students graduated from the school in 1893. In 1902, the first class to complete four years of high school graduated. In 1928 the new high school building was completed at an approximate cost of $30,000-$35,000. The name of the school then changed from Central High to Puyallup High School. In 1919, the school was expanded, adding a junior high along with the gym and auditorium. In 1926, a total of 112 students graduated.

=== Fire ===
The next year (1927), fire hit PHS and the graduation ceremony was held at the Liberty Theater. A new and larger auditorium was added in 1935.

=== Earthquakes ===
The 1949 Olympia earthquake on 13 April 1949 was the first major earthquake to hit Puyallup High School. PHS was not spared as there was serious damage to the building and auditorium. In 1965 the school suffered from the effects of yet another earthquake and again damage was done to the school—Puyallup High School was the only school closed in Pierce County. The band was recording that day, and there are still records in circulation with the sounds of the earthquake. The Nisqually earthquake on 28 February 2001 was the next earthquake to cause damage at the school.

=== Renovations ===
The first of the major remodeling projects occurred with the main classroom building in 1971. The gym was remodeled in 1984 and the Library Science Building in 1986. The entire campus was closed during the 1993–1994 school year during a major renovation. The 1,600 students were housed in portable buildings, spare rooms in churches, and other facilities around the city of Puyallup. Walls, beams, and structures were altered or removed to improve the structure and enhance the teaching and learning methods of the day. Every effort was made to retain the original design of the structure. The old gym was lost, but a new commons area was added. Part of the front steps were removed, but the auditorium was improved while maintaining the architecture and elegance of the facility. The architectural firm of Burr, Rising, Lawrence and Bates was awarded a Historic Renovation - Citation Award in 1996 for their work on the renovation.

== Academics ==
Academically, for the 2005–2006 school year, between the four comprehensive high schools in the Puyallup School District, Puyallup ranked 2nd, having beaten Rogers and Walker with an 87% in the reading WASL, 47% in the math WASL, 86% in the writing WASL, and 37% in the science WASL.

== Alumni association ==
The Puyallup High School Alumni Association provides scholarships to qualifying seniors. Students can apply in September directly through PHS. These scholarships are funded with proceeds from the annual dinner and auction held each December. Generous community members, alumni and philanthropists donate items for the live auction. Items are also available by raffle and silent auction. The event draws graduates and friends of PHS and is held at the Puyallup each year. Details are posted on their website linked below.

== Alumni reunions ==
Puyallup High School reunion activities are managed by the Viking Booster Club with the help of many alumni volunteers.

== Notable alumni ==
- Frank Brouillet – state legislator (1957–1973) and Washington State Superintendent of Public Instruction (1973–1989)
- Gail Bruce – AAFC and former NFL player
- Loren Carpenter – Computer graphics researcher and developer
- Adam Cimber – MLB pitcher for the San Diego Padres
- George Dahlberg - head basketball and football coach, 1931-1935
- Chris Egan – 7-time Emmy award winning television sports anchor/reporter for KING-TV
- Joshua Garnett – NFL offensive lineman, first round pick in 2016 NFL draft
- Luke Heimlich – baseball player
- Billy Joe Hobert – former NFL quarterback
- Brock Huard – former NFL quarterback; radio host for 710 ESPN Seattle
- Damon Huard – former NFL quarterback
- Luke Huard – college football coach
- George Hunt – member of the University of Washington rowing team; Gold Medalist, 1936 Olympic Games, Berlin
- Victor L. Kandle – World War II soldier, Congressional Medal of Honor recipient; Class of 1939
- Jim Kastama – 25th Legislative District, Washington state; Class of 1978
- Killian Larson – college and professional basketball player
- Chad Lindberg – actor, starred as Jesse in Fast and Furious
- Dane Looker – former NFL wide receiver, member of Puyallup school board
- Darren McGavin – actor, "The Old Man" in the classic holiday film A Christmas Story
- Ryan Moore – professional golfer, lettered four years on Viking golf team while attending Class 1A Cascade Christian High School
- Simeon Moses – winner of VH1's "The Pick-Up Artist 2"; Class of 1998
- Jamie Reid – Pan American Games gold medalist
- Leonard A. Sawyer – former Speaker of the House, Washington State House of Representatives
- Gertrude Wilhelmsen – Olympic athlete, 1936 Berlin Olympics, javelin and discus
