= Puyallup, Washington =

Puyallup, Washington st̕iləqʷac (Lushootseed)
- City
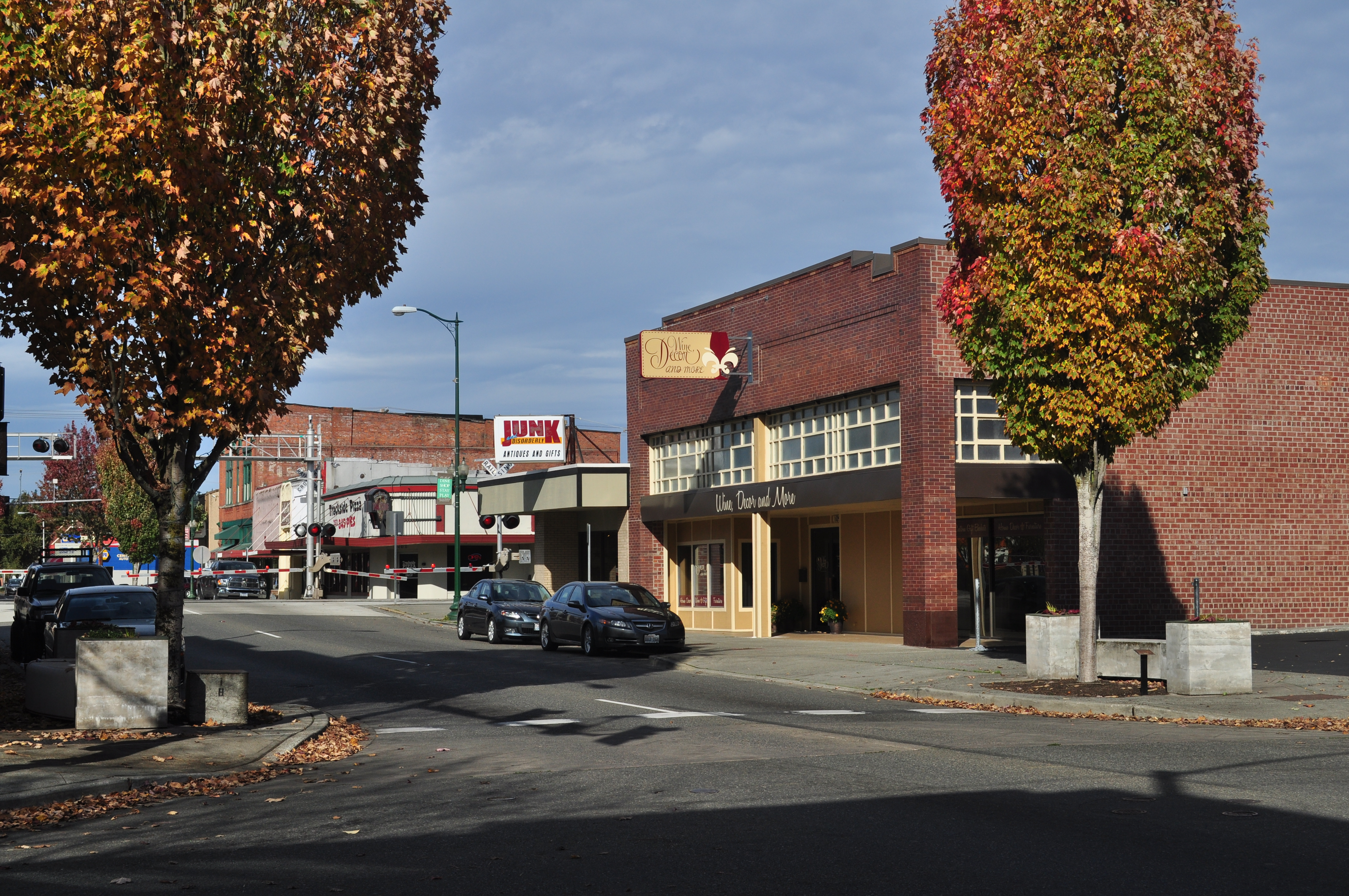
- Looking up North Meridian

- Flag Seal
- Nickname: P-Town
- Motto: "Working to Be Your Community of Choice"
- Interactive map of Puyallup, Washington
- Location within Washington (state) Location within the United States
- Coordinates: 47°10′32″N 122°16′20″W
- Country: United States
- State: Washington
- County: Pierce
- Incorporated: 1890
- Named for: Puyallup tribe

Government
  - Type: Council–manager
  - Mayor: Ned Witting

Area
  - Total: 14.24 sq mi (36.89 km^{2})
  - Land: 14.14 sq mi (36.61 km^{2})
  - Water: 0.11 sq mi (0.28 km^{2})
- Elevation: 52 ft (16 m)

Population (2020)
  - Total: 42,973
  - Estimate (2024): 42,552
  - Density: 2,996.8/sq mi (1,157.07/km^{2})
- Time zone: UTC−8 (Pacific (PST))
  - Summer (DST): UTC−7 (PDT)
- ZIP codes: 98371-98375
- Area code: 253
- FIPS code: 53-56695
- GNIS feature ID: 2411504
- Website: www.puyallupwa.gov

Puyallup (/pjuːˈæləp/ pew-AL-əp; Lushootseed: st̕iləqʷac lit. "strawberry plant") is a city in Pierce County, Washington, United States. It is on the Puyallup River about 10 miles (16 km) southeast of Tacoma and 35 miles (56 km) south of Seattle. The city had a population of 42,973 at the 2020 census.

The city's name comes from the Puyallup tribe of Native Americans and means "the generous people" in Lushootseed. Puyallup is home to the Washington State Fair, the state's largest annual fair. The name of the city is also used in mailing addresses for adjacent unincorporated areas, such as the larger-populated South Hill.

== History ==
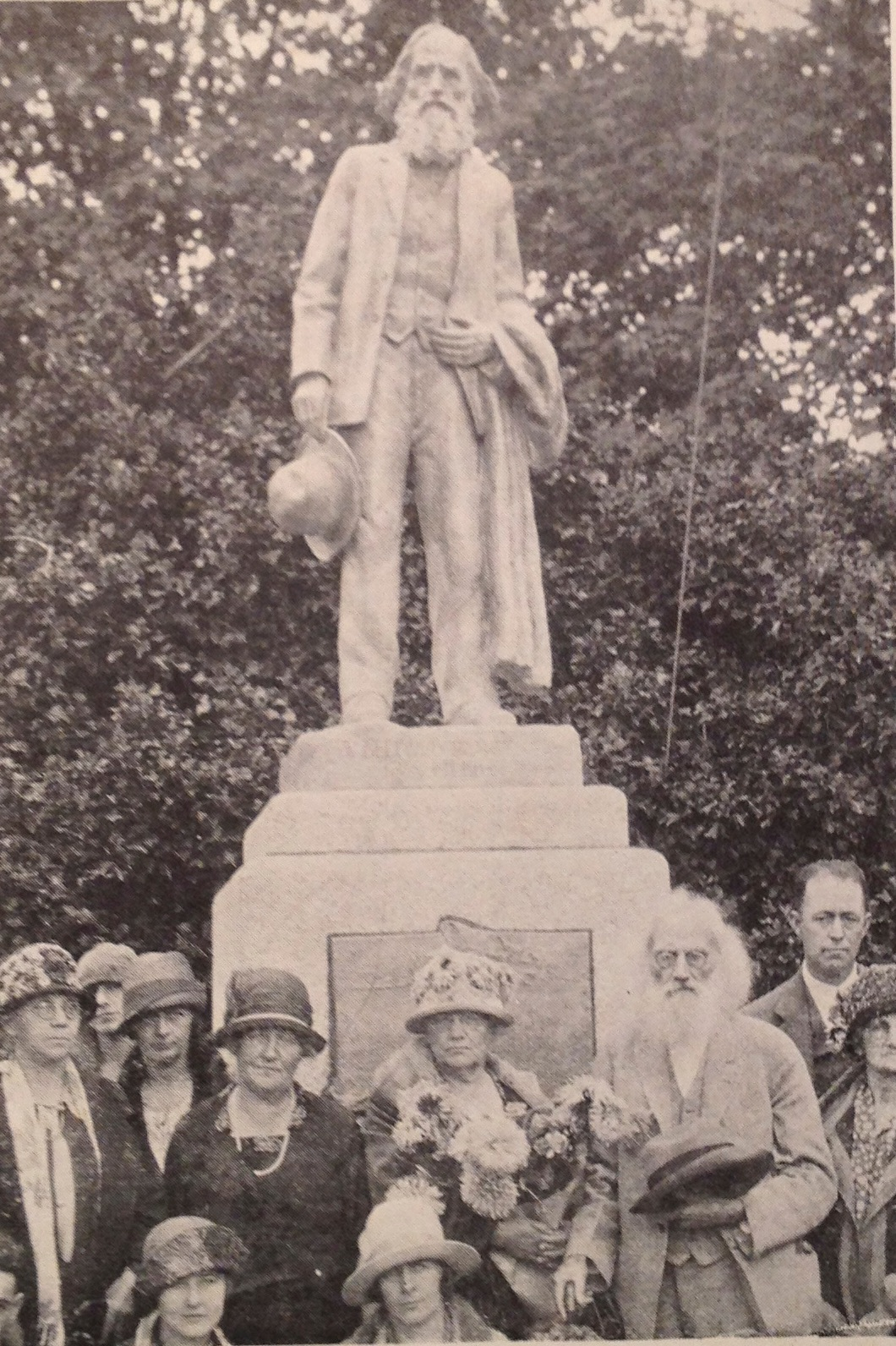
Ezra Meeker (near lower right) at the 1926 dedication of his own statue by Alonzo Victor Lewis in Puyallup's Pioneer Park, on the site of his original cabin

The Puyallup Valley was originally inhabited by the Puyallup people, known in their language as the spuyaləpabš, meaning "generous and welcoming behavior to all people (friends and strangers) who enter our lands." The first white settlers in the region were part of the first wagon train to cross the Cascade Range at Naches Pass in 1853.

Native Americans numbered about 2,000 in what is now the Puyallup Valley in the 1830s and 1840s. The first European settlers arrived in the 1850s. In 1877, Ezra Meeker platted a townsite and named it Puyallup after the local Puyallup Indian tribes, 11 years after departing from Indiana. The town grew rapidly throughout the 1880s, in large part thanks to Meeker's hop farm, which brought in millions of dollars to Puyallup, leading to it eventually being incorporated in 1890, with Ezra Meeker as its first mayor. The turn of the 20th century brought change to the valley with the growth of nearby Tacoma and the interurban rail lines. The Western Washington Fairgrounds were developed giving local farmers a place to exhibit their crops and livestock. During the early part of World War II due to Executive Order 9066, the fairgrounds were part of Camp Harmony, a temporary Japanese American internment camp for more than 7,000 detainees, most of whom were American citizens. Subsequently, they were moved to the Minidoka relocation center near Twin Falls, Idaho.

== Geography ==
Puyallup is approximately 10 miles (16 km) southeast of Tacoma and 35 miles (56 km) south of Seattle. It is situated along the Puyallup River, which flows for 45 miles (72 km) from the Puyallup and Tahoma glaciers on Mount Rainier to Commencement Bay in Tacoma. The river drains an area of 948 square miles (2,460 km^{2}) and was formed approximately 5,600 years before present. The city lies within the Puyallup Valley, an agricultural region that produces berries and daffodils, for which the annual local festival is named.

According to the United States Census Bureau, the city has a total area of 14.04 square miles (36.36 km^{2}), of which 13.93 square miles (36.08 km^{2}) is land and 0.11 square miles (0.28 km^{2}) is water, mainly consisting of the Puyallup River estuary. Puyallup is surrounded by unincorporated areas; its closest municipalities include the city of Sumner to the northeast, Fife and Edgewood to the north, Tacoma to the northwest, Summit and Midland to the west, South Hill, Graham and Frederickson to the south, McMillin and Orting to the southeast, and Alderton to the east.

The city includes wildlife habitats for urbanized bird species and small mammals, reptiles, and amphibians. The riparian areas near streams and the Puyallup River host coho salmon, chinook salmon, chum salmon, birds, salamanders, frogs, osprey, ducks, river otters, and beavers.

=== Volcanic risk ===
Downtown Puyallup and nearby neighborhoods lie within the hazard zone for lahars that could be produced in a moderate or large eruption of nearby Mount Rainier. The city's position on the Puyallup River is downstream of the western flank of Mount Rainier, which has the highest potential for producing far-traveled lahars due to the abundance of weakened clay-rich rock at high altitudes. The entire Puyallup Valley is built on deposits of the 5,600-year-old Osceola Mudflow, which deposited as much as 98 feet (30 m) of material and was similar to largest lahars Mount Rainier could produce. A 2009 study by the United States Geological Survey (USGS) determined that Puyallup has the highest number of dependent-population facilities, public venues, and overall community assets within lahar hazard zones. The Washington State Department of Natural Resources estimates that the Puyallup Valley could experience $6–12 billion in damage from a major lahar.

To combat lahar danger, Pierce County maintains the Mount Rainier Volcano Lahar Warning System, implemented in 1998 by the USGS. The system includes lahar warning sirens and volcano evacuation route signs. The Puyallup city government and Puyallup School District have also taken part in annual lahar exercises to prepare the community and test warning systems. The 2014 drill included 5,000 students at all schools in the district; Puyallup High School was fully evacuated within four minutes and the first group of students reached a designated high-ground area in nineteen minutes. The March 2024 drill included 45,000 participants across the region and was the largest lahar evacuation drill that the USGS described as the "world's largest".

=== Climate ===
Puyallup experiences an oceanic climate (Köppen classification: Csb; Trewartha classification: Do). Winters are cool and wet, with high temperatures averaging in the mid to upper 40s and lows near freezing. The surrounding hills (averaging 500 feet (150 m) above sea level) often experience the extremes of winter, with more frequent lows below freezing and greater snowfall. Snowfall is rare, and often only occurs on a few days a year, sometimes as early as November, and as late as April. Spring brings less rain and milder temperatures, with highs regularly in the mid 50s (12–14 °C), to around 60 (15 °C). Spring often records the first 70 °F (21 °C) temperature. Summers are warm and dry, with highs in the 70s most days. The mean temperatures in Puyallup range from a low of 33 °F (1 °C) in January to a high of 73 °F (23 °C) in August. The highest recorded temperature is 105 °F (41 °C). Summer is warmest in July and August, and occasionally September. By October and the fall season, temperatures start to drop and precipitation increases. The majority of the area's precipitation falls between October and March.

== Demographics ==
Historical population
Census	Pop.	Note	%±
1870	312		—
1880	297		−4.8%
1890	1,732		483.2%
1900	1,884		8.8%
1910	4,544		141.2%
1920	6,323		39.2%
1930	7,094		12.2%
1940	7,889		11.2%
1950	10,010		26.9%
1960	12,063		20.5%
1970	14,742		22.2%
1980	18,251		23.8%
1990	23,875		30.8%
2000	33,011		38.3%
2010	37,022		12.2%
2020	42,973		16.1%
2024 (est.)	42,552		−1.0%
U.S. Decennial Census; 2020 Census

=== 2020 census ===
As of the 2020 census, Puyallup had a population of 42,973 and a median age of 38.1 years. 21.6% of residents were under the age of 18 and 16.3% were 65 years of age or older. For every 100 females there were 95.0 males, and for every 100 females age 18 and over there were 92.1 males age 18 and over.

All residents lived in urban areas while none lived in rural areas.

There were 17,012 households in Puyallup, of which 30.2% had children under the age of 18 living in them. Of all households, 46.4% were married-couple households, 17.6% were households with a male householder and no spouse or partner present, and 27.1% were households with a female householder and no spouse or partner present. About 27.7% of all households were made up of individuals and 11.4% had someone living alone who was 65 years of age or older.

There were 18,106 housing units, of which 6.0% were vacant. The homeowner vacancy rate was 0.9% and the rental vacancy rate was 6.3%.

Racial composition as of the 2020 census
Race	Number	Percent
White	31,187	72.6%
Black or African American	1,716	4.0%
American Indian and Alaska Native	570	1.3%
Asian	2,434	5.7%
Native Hawaiian and Other Pacific Islander	597	1.4%
Some other race	1,722	4.0%
Two or more races	4,747	11.0%
Hispanic or Latino (of any race)	4,216	9.8%

=== 2010 census ===
As of the 2010 census, there were 37,022 people, 14,950 households, and 9,528 families residing in the city. The population density was 2,657.7 inhabitants per square mile (1,026.1/km^{2}). There were 16,171 housing units at an average density of 1,160.9 per square mile (448.2/km^{2}). The racial makeup of the city was 84.4% White, 2.1% African American, 1.4% Native American, 3.8% Asian, 0.7% Pacific Islander, 2.1% from other races, and 5.5% from two or more races. Hispanic or Latino of any race were 6.9% of the population.

There were 14,950 households, of which 32.8% had children under age 18 living with them, 45.8% were married couples living together, 12.8% had a female householder with no husband present, 5.1% had a male householder with no wife present, and 36.3% were non-families. 28.5% of all households were made up of individuals, and 10.7% had someone living alone who was aged 65 years or older. The average household size was 2.43 persons and the average family size was 2.98.

The median age in the city was 36.8 years. 23.6% of residents were under age 18; 10.2% were between ages 18 and 24; 27% were from 25 to 44; 26.8% were from 45 to 64; and 12.4% were 65 years of age or older. The gender makeup of the city was 48.0% male and 52.0% female.

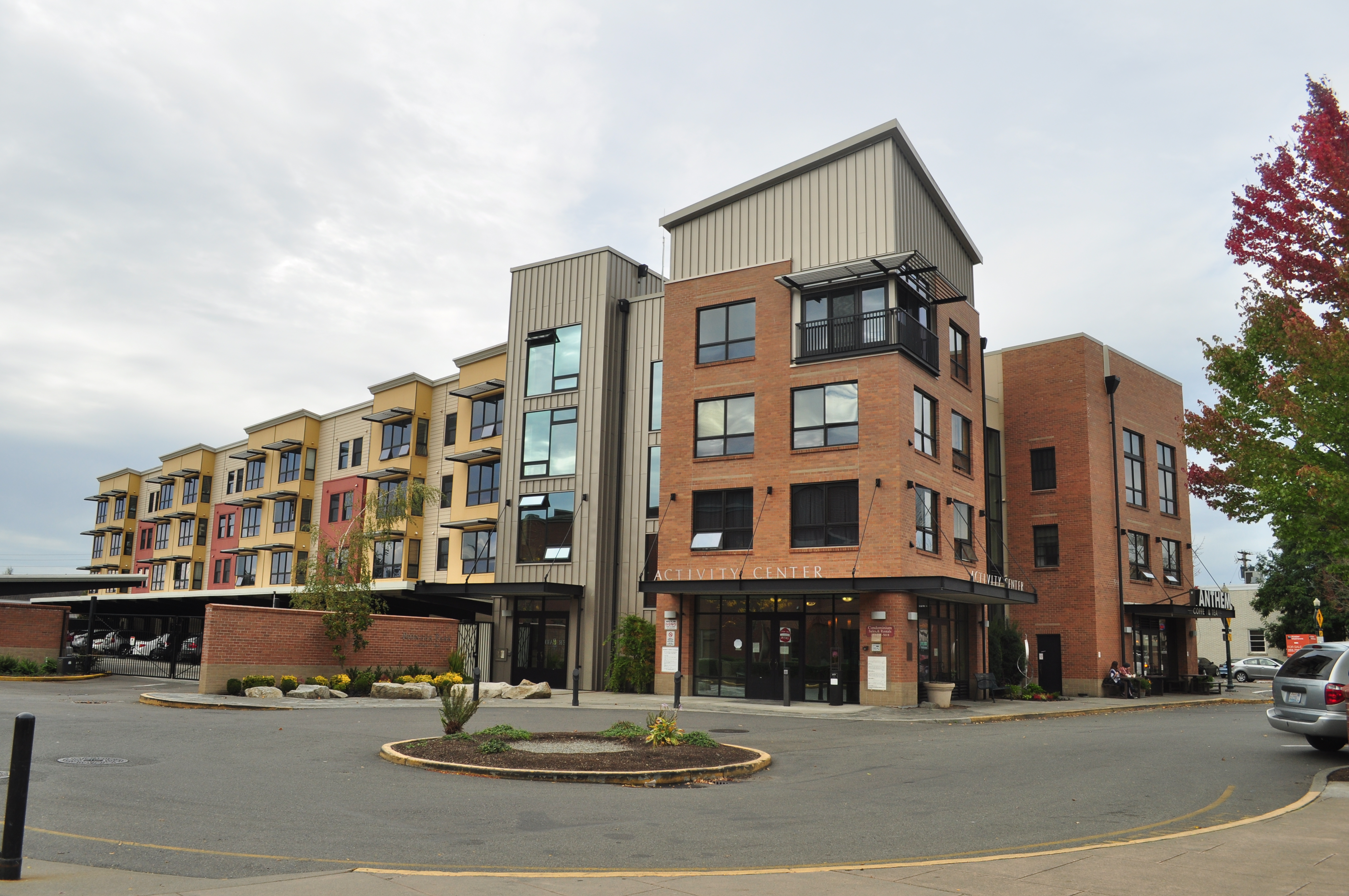
A modern condominium project near Pioneer Park

=== 2000 census ===
As of the 2000 census, there were 33,011 people, 12,870 households, and 8,519 families residing in the city. The population density was 2,719.2 people per square mile (1,049.9/km^{2}). There were 13,467 housing units at an average density of 1,109.3 people per square mile (428.3/km^{2}). The racial makeup of the city was 87.88% White, 1.50% African American, 1.01% Native American, 3.27% Asian, 0.34% Pacific Islander, 1.94% from other races, and 4.06% from two or more races. Hispanic or Latino of any race were 4.67% of the population.

There were 12,870 households, out of which 36.0% had children under the age of 18 living with them, 49.7% were married couples living together, 11.7% had a female householder with no husband present, and 33.8% were non-families. 26.9% of all households were made up of individuals, 9.5% of which were 65 years of age or older. The average household size was 2.53 and the average family size was 3.08.

In the city, the age distribution of the population shows 27.3% under the age of 18, 10.2% from 18 to 24, 30.8% from 25 to 44, 20.8% from 45 to 64, and 10.9% who were 65 years of age or older. The median age was 34 years. For every 100 females, there were 93.5 males. For every 100 females age 18 and over, there were 90.9 males.

The median income for a household in the city was $47,269, and the median income for a family was $57,322. Males had a median income of $43,562 versus $27,281 for females. The per capita income for the city was $22,401. About 4.7% of families and 6.7% of the population were below the poverty line, including 7.2% of those under age 18 and 6.5% of those age 65 or over.

== Culture ==
=== Art ===
Starting in 1995, the regional nonprofit organization Valley Arts United began working with local volunteers to support a rotating selection of outdoor public artwork. Consisting mostly of statuary dispersed about the downtown core, this collection has grown to a collection of about 32 permanent pieces. New works are added regularly.

=== Events ===
Puyallup also hosts part of the annual Daffodil Parade alongside Tacoma, Sumner, and Orting. The parade includes floats that are covered in daffodils or are themed to reflect the spring season.

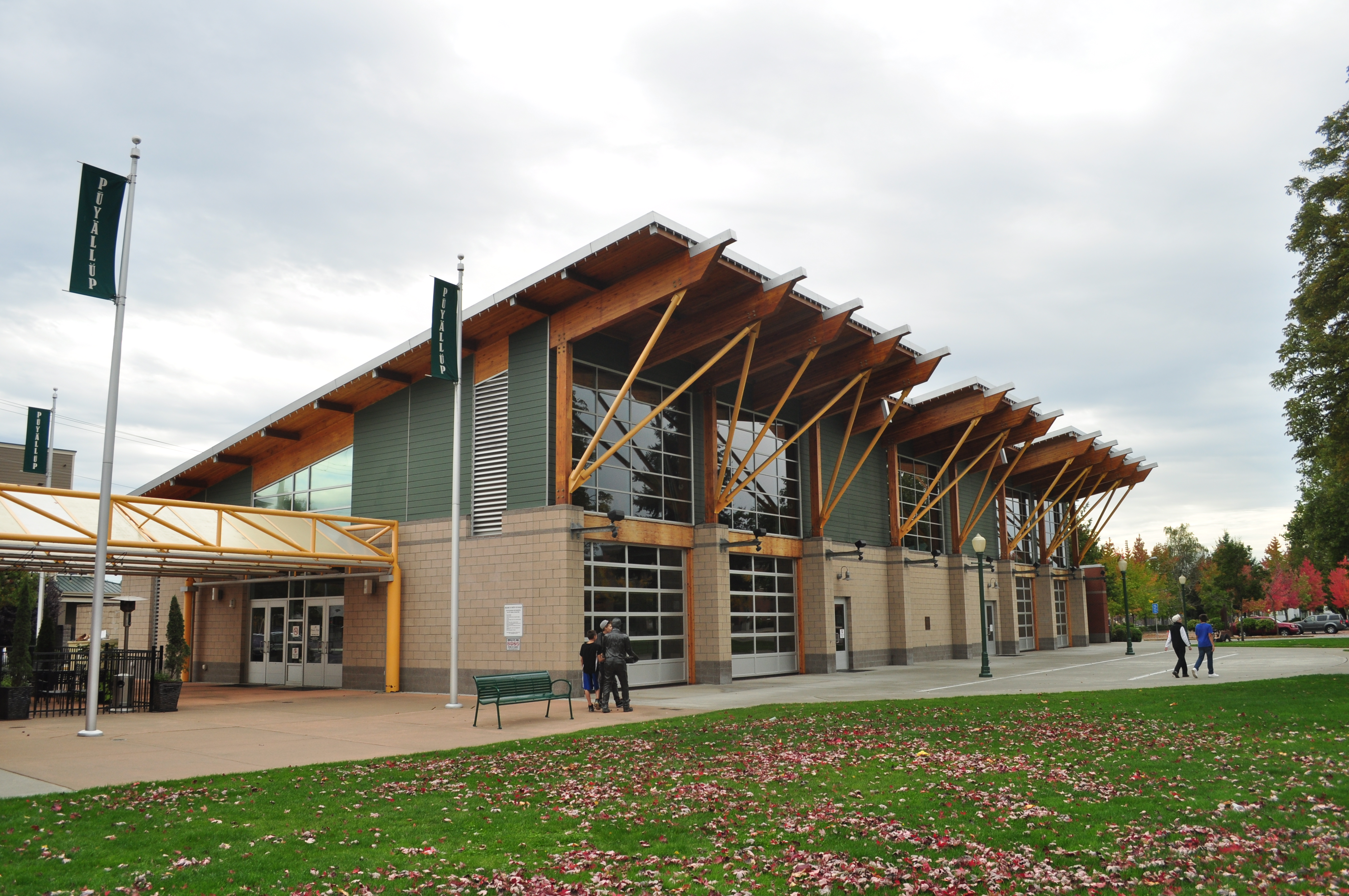
Pioneer Park Pavilion

The Puyallup Main Street Association produces a local farmers' market that is open on Saturdays from April to October. It is held at Pioneer Park and along nearby streets and includes live entertainment. An associated holiday market opens in December. The Puyallup Farmers' Market is one of the largest farmers' markets in the state.

=== Washington State Fair ===
Puyallup is home to the Washington State Fair. It is one of the largest U.S. state fairs, attracting over one million people each year. The fair traditionally runs for several weeks in September; there is also a "Spring Fair" which takes place for four days in April. The Puyallup Fairgrounds is used for other events during the offseason. The Washington State Fair was originally the "Puyallup Fair" until it was renamed in 2013; "Do the Puyallup" has been its long-standing promotional slogan.

During World War II, the Puyallup Fairgrounds became the Puyallup Assembly Area (euphemistically referred to as "Camp Harmony") and were used as an internment camp for United States citizens or residents of Japanese descent or origin.

=== Historic buildings and sites ===
==== Antique district ====
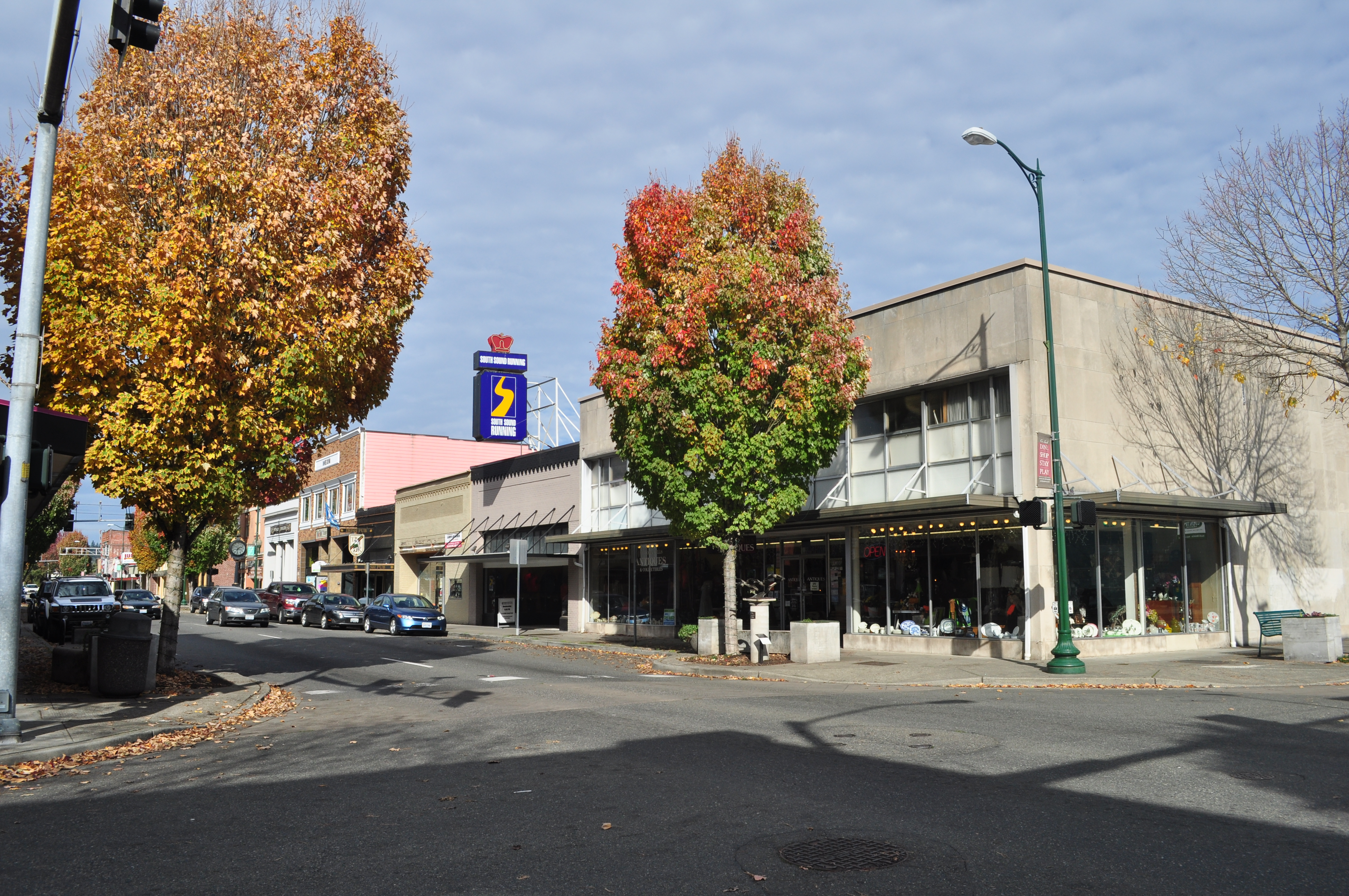
East side of 100 block of S. Meridian; in foreground, an antique shop in a former J.C. Penney

Puyallup is known for its antiques stores, many of which are located next to each other on the main north–south street of Meridian.

==== Ezra Meeker's mansion ====
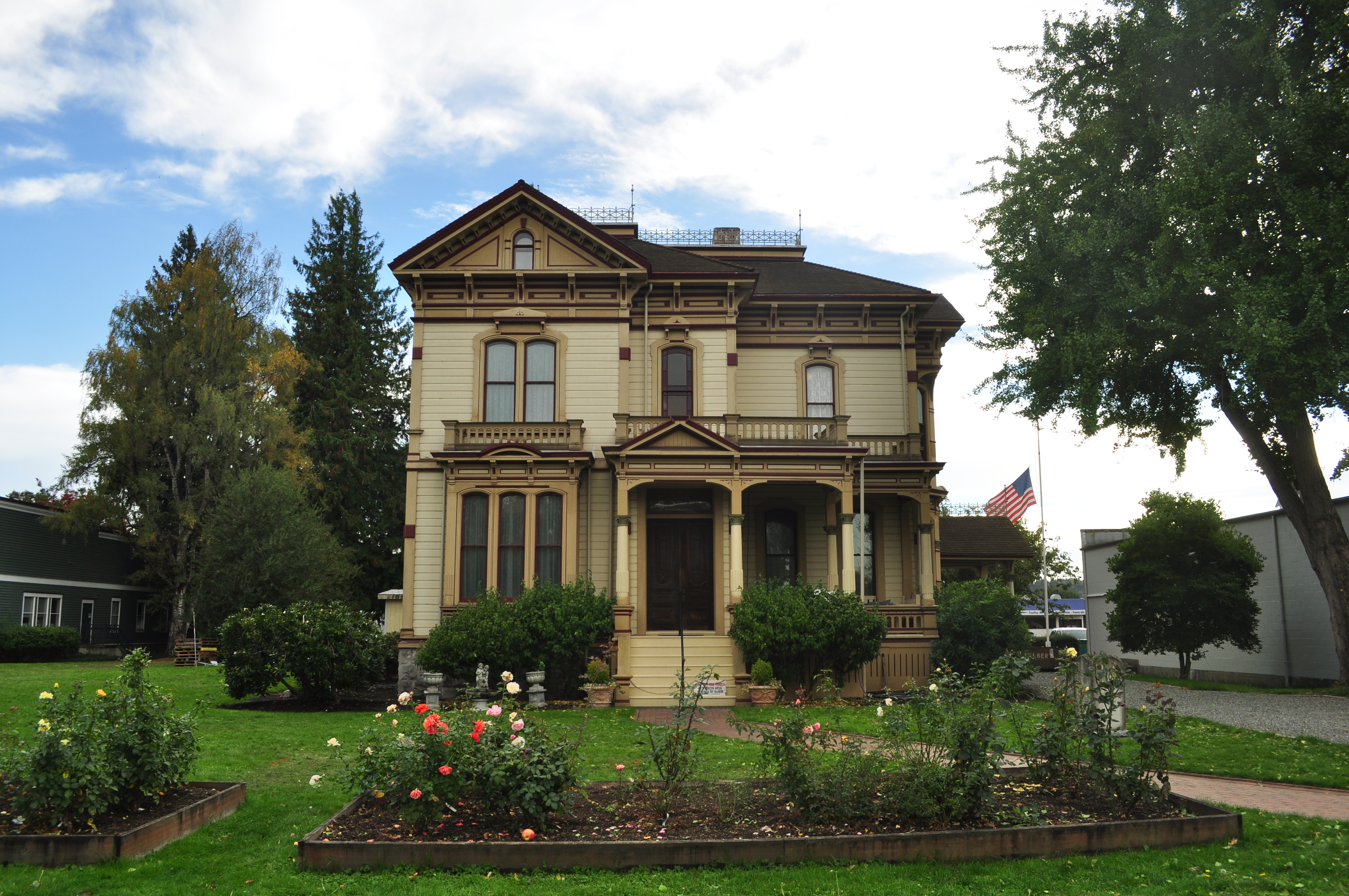
Ezra Meeker Mansion in 2015

The Ezra Meeker Mansion, an Italianate Victorian structure completed around 1890, was the residence of Oregon Trail pioneer Ezra Meeker and his wife, Eliza Jane. Meeker, known as the "Hop King," lost his wealth due to a disease that affected the hops industry. Despite this, he gained fame for retracing the Oregon Trail and erecting monuments along its route to preserve its history. Today, the mansion operates as a small house museum, managed by the Puyallup Historical Society at Meeker Mansion. The venue is also available for weddings, teas, and other social gatherings.

==== House of Tomorrow ====
The House of Tomorrow was built in 1941 by Bert Allen Smyser and followed the Streamline Moderne architectural style. The home, listed at 1,012 square feet (94.0 m^{2}), was situated at Clarks Creek and the George Milroy truss bridge. Due to repeated damages from flooding of the nearby creek, the home was demolished in April 2024. The land is planned to be converted into a protected wetland.

==== Paul H. Karshner Memorial Museum ====
The Karshner Museum is a natural history museum operated by the Puyallup School District. It opened in the 1930s from the donated collections of its namesakes and was renovated in 2014 to incorporate artifacts from the Puyallup Tribe and other indigenous communities. The museum has more than 10,000 artifacts and is part of regular field trips for students in the Puyallup School District.

== Parks and recreation ==
Pioneer Park is a community focal point, which boasts a public library, a park with a playground, and walking paths. As the focal point of the park, there is a bronze statue honoring Ezra Meeker. A new element is the public stage by the public library. At the public stage local musicians put on free shows for the public. The beginning trailhead for the Pierce County Foothills Trail is located in southeast Puyallup.

== Education ==
The Puyallup School District has 35 schools and serves more than 22,534 students. The district is the ninth-largest in the state, extending to neighboring South Hill, parts of Tacoma, and the Edgewood area.

Puyallup is also home to Pierce College Puyallup, a community college that opened in 1990. It is one of the two main campuses belonging to the college, the other being Pierce College Fort Steilacoom in Lakewood.

== Media ==
The Puyallup Herald is the local newspaper for eastern Pierce County. It is published once a week on Wednesdays. The paper is distributed by The News Tribune.

The city is served by the Puyallup Public Library, which was established in 1913 and has been housed in its current building in Pioneer Park since 2002. It is not affiliated with either the Tacoma Public Library or the Pierce County Library System.

== Transportation ==
Puyallup is located at the intersection of State Route 167 and State Route 512, with freeway access to Lakewood and the Green River Valley. The city is also served by Pierce Transit buses and a microtransit zone that launched in 2023. Sounder commuter trains stop at Puyallup station on weekdays.

The city is located near the Pierce County Airport (KPLU), a small municipal airport in South Hill.

== Notable people ==
- John Albert, mixed martial artist
- Mathias Anderle, singer, songwriter and actor.
- Davey Armstrong, Olympic boxer
- Zach Banner, American football player
- Frank Brouillet, politician and former Washington State Superintendent of Public Instruction
- Gail Bruce, former American football player
- Sarah Butler, actress
- Army Sergeant First Class Nathan Chapman, First US combat casualty of Operation Enduring Freedom
- Casey Carrigan, track and field athlete
- Chester Victor Clifton Jr. Army Major General
- Amber Cope, NASCAR driver
- Natasha Curry, news anchor
- Zach Davies, Major League Baseball player
- Chris Egan, sports reporter and news anchor
- Joshua Garnett, former professional football player
- Brandon Gibson, American football player
- Chris Gildon, state legislator
- Harriet A. Hall, medical columnist and Alternative medicine critic
- Nick Harmer, bassist for Death Cab for Cutie
- Luke Heimlich, former professional baseball pitcher
- Teri Hickel, state representative
- Billy Joe Hobert, former professional football player
- Brock Huard, sports talk show host and former American football player
- Damon Huard, former professional football quarterback
- George Hunt, was an American rower who won Olympic gold at the 1936 Summer Olympics
- Megan Jendrick, Olympic swimmer
- Demetrious Johnson, UFC fighter
- Levi Jordan, Major League Baseball player
- Killian Larson, retired basketball player
- Chloe Kitts, college basketball player
- Dustin-Leigh Konzelman, Miss California (2005) and Amazing Race contestant
- Jon Lester, Major League Baseball player
- Chad Lindberg, actor
- Dane Looker, former professional football player
- Ryan Moore, professional golfer
- Jim Mosolf, outfielder in Major League Baseball
- Lora Ottenad, professional bodybuilder
- Susie A. Parks, switchboard operator
- Lyndsey Patterson, professional soccer midfielder and forward
- Tim Peterson, former professional baseball pitcher
- Angela Rasmussen, virologist
- Drew Rasmussen, Major League Baseball player
- Jamie Reid, backstroke swimmer
- Angela Ruch, professional stockcar driver
- Leonard A. Sawyer, state legislator
- Kelly Sullivan, actress
- Randy Tate, former United States congressman
- Justin Veltung, former American football wide receiver
- Courtney Wetzel, soccer midfielder
- Gertrude Wilhelmsen, Olympic athlete
- Jonah Williams, professional football defensive end
- Quinn Wolcott, American umpire in Major League Baseball
- Soyeon Yi, South Korean astronaut
- Michelle Harrison, actress
