= Athletes for Kids =

U.S. nonprofit organization

- Formation: 2002
- Founder: Ken and Liz Moscaret
- Type: Non-Profit Organization
- Headquarters: Sammamish/Issaquah, WA
- Location: Eastside of Seattle
- Website: http://athletesforkids.org/

Athletes for Kids is a nonprofit organization founded in 2002. The organization works to enhance the lives of children with special needs by partnering them with a high school athlete to form an encouraging friendship. AFK's mission is to create communities where children of all abilities are celebrated.

== History ==
Ken and Liz Moscaret became co-founders of AFK in 2002 while brainstorming at their kitchen table with two other friends. The organization began with six high school athletes, now each year over 200 youth are benefiting from these special mentorships.

Since beginning the organization in 2002, at Skyline High School, it has grown to support Eastlake High School, Liberty High School, Issaquah High School, Eastside Catholic, Redmond High School, The Overlake School, Newport High School, Mercer Island High School, Bellevue High School, Woodinville High School, Mount Si High School, and Renton High School.

== Mentorships ==
Most commonly, children in the program are struggling with ADHD, autism, depression, and/or a wide range of physical, emotional, and developmental disabilities. The "Kids" in Athletes for Kids range from grades 1st through 8th, ages 5–14. These kids are elementary and middle school students mentored by high school athletes.

To become a mentor, candidates must go through an application process. Generally mentors are referred to the program through a sports Coach, Athletic Directors, Teachers, members of the Community, and other mentors. After being referred, candidates must complete the screening and background check to guarantee safety for their "buddy". Once the application process is complete, new mentors must attend a training session in order to learn the appropriate behaviors of being a mentor. All mentors meet monthly to evaluate how the mentorship is going, ways to improve, creative ideas, and helpful guidance from others.

== Benefits ==
Mentors and their buddy meet two to four times a month for two hours or so. Mentorships range from 1–3 years, but in most cases, carry on after the mentor graduates from High School. Each mentorship looks different, but the goal of the relationship is to create a special friendship. Some activities mentorships participate in are board games, arts and crafts, playing at parks, or practicing a sport.
