= Kingco Athletic Conference =

The KingCo Athletic Conference is a high school athletics conference in King County, Washington, part of the Washington Interscholastic Activities Association (WIAA). Its 25 members are in SeaKing District II, which includes Seattle and east King County, and includes schools in the four highest classification levels: 4A, 3A, 2A, and 1A.

== Members ==
=== 4A members ===
| High School | Location | Founded | Joined | Affiliation | 2022-23 Enrollment | Nickname |
|---|---|---|---|---|---|---|
| Bothell | Bothell | 1953 | 1953 | Public (Northshore S.D.) | 1,788 | Cougars |
| Eastlake | Sammamish | 1993 | 1993 | Public (Lake Washington S.D.) | 2,357 | Wolves |
| Hazen | Renton | 1968 | 2020 | Public (Renton S.D.) | 1,870 | Highlanders |
| Issaquah | Issaquah | 1905 | 1953 | Public (Issaquah S.D.) | 2,468 | Eagles |
| Juanita | Kirkland | 1971 | 1972 | Public (Lake Washington S.D.) | 1,692 | Ravens |
| Lake Washington | Kirkland | 1922 | 1953 | Public (Lake Washington S.D.) | 2,015 | Kangaroos |
| Mount Si | Snoqualmie | 1953 | 1953; 1997 | Public (Snoqualmie Valley S.D.) | 2,089 | Wildcats |
| Newport | Bellevue | 1964 | 1965 | Public (Bellevue S.D.) | 1,789 | Knights |
| North Creek | Bothell | 2017 | 2017 | Public (Northshore S.D.) | 1,797 | Jaguars |
| Redmond | Redmond | 1965 | 1965 | Public (Lake Washington S.D.) | 2,220 | Mustangs |
| Skyline | Sammamish | 1997 | 1997 | Public (Issaquah S.D.) | 2,199 | Spartans |
| Woodinville | Woodinville | 1983 | 1984 | Public (Northshore S.D.) | 1,659 | Falcons |

=== 3A members ===
| High School | Location | Founded | Joined | Affiliation | 2022-23 Enrollment | Nickname |
|---|---|---|---|---|---|---|
| Bellevue | Bellevue | 1923 | 1953 | Public (Bellevue S.D.) | 1,530 | Wolverines |
| Highline | Burien | 1924 | 2020 | Public (Highline Public Schools) | 1,326 | Pirates |
| Inglemoor | Kenmore | 1964 | 1966 | Public (Northshore S.D.) | 1,561 | Vikings |
| Interlake | Bellevue | 1968 | 1968 | Public (Bellevue S.D.) | 1,566 | Saints |
| Liberty | Renton | 1977 | 1997 | Public (Issaquah S.D.) | 1,492 | Patriots |
| Mercer Island | Mercer Island | 1957 | 1956 | Public (Mercer Island S.D.) | 1,526 | Islanders |
| Sammamish | Bellevue | 1959 | 1960 | Public (Bellevue S.D.) | 1,320 | Redhawks |

=== 2A members ===
| High School | Location | Founded | Joined | Affiliation | Enrollment | Nickname |
|---|---|---|---|---|---|---|
| Cedarcrest | Duvall | 1993 | 1997; 2024 | Public (Riverview School District (Washington)) | 931 | Red Wolves |
| Evergreen | White Center | 1955 | 2020 | Public (Highline Public Schools) | 1,043 | Wolverines |
| Foster | Tukwila | 1915 | 1953; 2020 | Public (Tukwila S.D.) | 867 | Bulldogs |
| Lindbergh | Renton | 1972 | 2020 | Public (Renton S.D.) | 1,274 | Eagles |
| Renton | Renton | 1911 | 2020 | Public (Renton S.D.) | 1,229 | Redhawks |

=== 1A members ===
| High School | Location | Founded | Joined | Affiliation | Enrollment | Nickname |
|---|---|---|---|---|---|---|
| Tyee | Seatac | 1962 | 2020 | Public (Highline Public Schools) | 678 | Totems |

=== Former members ===
| High School | Location | Founded | Joined | Left | Affiliation | Enrollment | Nickname |
|---|---|---|---|---|---|---|---|
| Ballard | Seattle, WA | 1903 | 2003 | 2013 | Public (Seattle Public Schools) | 1,648 | Beavers |
| Eastside Catholic | Sammamish, WA | 1980 | 1985 | 1988 | Private | 602 | Crusaders |
| Federal Way | Federal Way, WA | 1938 | 1956 | 1965 | Public (Federal Way Public Schools) | 1,640 | Eagles |
| Franklin | Seattle, WA | 1912 | 1997 | 2007 | Public (Seattle Public Schools) | 1,241 | Quakers |
| Garfield | Seattle, WA | 1920 | 1997 | 2013 | Public (Seattle Public Schools) | 1,643 | Bulldogs |
| Roosevelt | Seattle, WA | 1922 | 1997 | 2013 | Public (Seattle Public Schools) | 1,533 | Rough Riders |

=== Membership Timeline ===
As of 2024–25 school year

Public School Private School

== Sports ==
- Baseball (boys)
- Basketball (boys)
- Basketball (girls)
- Badminton (girls)
- Cheer (girls)
- Cross Country (boys)
- Cross Country (girls)
- Dance/Drill (coed)
- Fastpitch Softball (girls)
- Football (boys)
- Lacrosse (boys)
- Lacrosse (girls)
- Golf (boys)
- Golf (girls)
- Gymnastics (girls)
- Soccer (boys)
- Soccer (girls)
- Swim & Dive (boys)
- Swim & Dive (girls)
- Tennis (boys)
- Tennis (girls)
- Track & Field (boys)
- Track & Field (girls)
- Volleyball (girls)
- Water Polo (boys)
- Wrestling (boys)
- Wrestling (girls)
