= Max Browne =

American football player (born 1995)

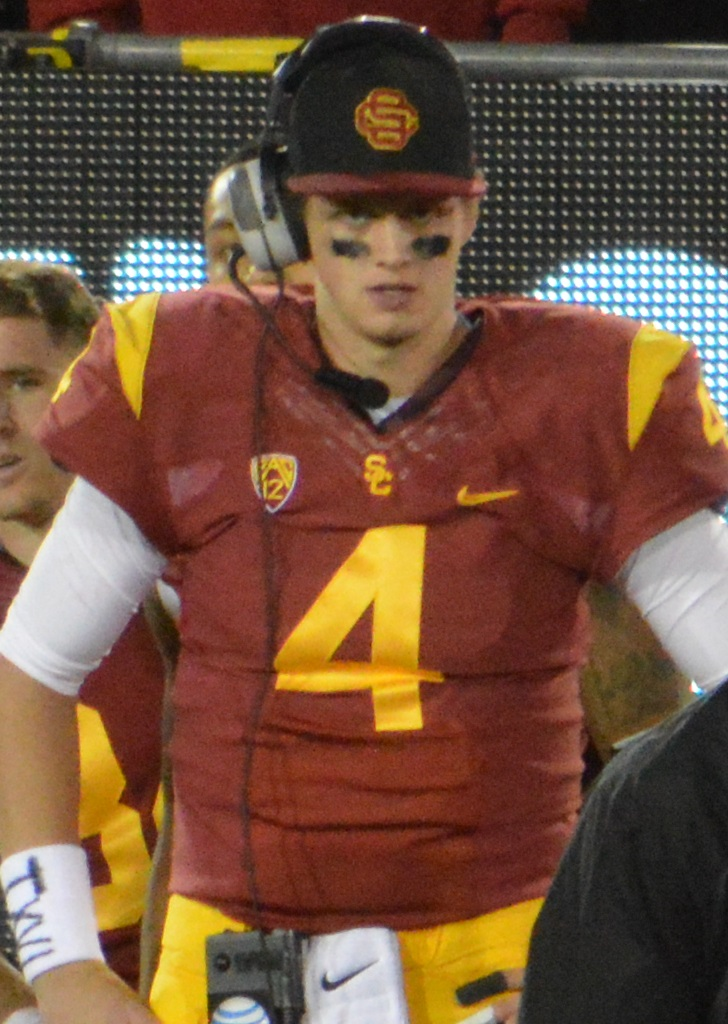
- Browne with the USC Trojans in 2013

Profile
- Position: Quarterback

Personal information
- Born: February 2, 1995 (age 31); Sammamish, Washington, U.S.
- Listed height: 6 ft 5 in (1.96 m)
- Listed weight: 230 lb (104 kg)

Career information
- High school: Skyline (Sammamish)
- College: USC (2013–2016); Pittsburgh (2017)

Awards and highlights
- Hall Trophy (2012); National Gatorade Player of the Year (2013); 2× WA Gatorade Player of the Year (2011, 2012); USA Today HS Football Player of the Year (2012); USA Today HS First-team All-USA (2012); Max Preps HS First-team All-American (2012)

Max Austin Browne (born February 2, 1995) is an American football analyst and former quarterback. He played college football for the USC Trojans (2013–2016) and Pittsburgh Panthers (2017).

Browne committed to USC on April 4, 2012, during his junior year, and was considered the best quarterback recruit of his class by Rivals.com and Scout.com. He transferred to Pitt on December 15, 2016, as a graduate transfer.

== Early life ==
Born and raised in Sammamish, Washington, a suburb east of Seattle, Browne attended Beaver Lake Middle School and Skyline High School in Sammamish. During his high school career, he completed 73.5 percent of his passes for 12,951 yards and 146 touchdowns. He was the Gatorade Player of the Year for Washington in 2011 and 2012, and led the Spartans to three straight Class 4A state finals, winning the final two.

Following his senior season, Browne participated in the 2013 U.S. Army All-American Bowl and was awarded the prestigious Hall Trophy as U.S. Army Player of the Year.

=== High school statistics ===
| Season | G | Passing | | | | | | | Rushing | | | Season | |
| Season | G | Cmp | Att | Pct | Yds | TD | Int | Rtg | Att | Yds | TD | Win | Loss |
|---|---|---|---|---|---|---|---|---|---|---|---|---|---|
| 2009 | 9 | 23 | 35 | 65.7 | 205 | 2 | 0 | – | 13 | 43 | 0 | — | — |
| 2010 | 14 | 294 | 432 | 68.1 | 4,182 | 50 | 13 | – | 32 | −48 | 2 | 12 | 2 |
| 2011 | 14 | 288 | 409 | 70.4 | 4,034 | 45 | 7 | – | 42 | 221 | 2 | 11 | 3 |
| 2012 | 14 | 277 | 377 | 73.5 | 4,526 | 49 | 5 | – | 67 | 15 | 6 | 14 | 0 |
| Career | 51 | 882 | 1,253 | 70.4 | 12,947 | 146 | 25 | – | 154 | 231 | 10 | 37 | 5 |

== College career ==
=== USC ===
==== 2013 season ====
On April 4, 2012, Browne committed to play football at the University of Southern California. He selected USC as his college destination over Oklahoma, Washington, and Alabama. In 2013, Browne was redshirted as a true freshman, after failing to beat out Cody Kessler and Max Wittek for the starting quarterback job. Head coach Lane Kiffin eventually named Kessler the starting quarterback in the fall.

==== 2014 season ====
In 2014, after Steve Sarkisian took over as head coach, Browne again lost the starting quarterback battle to Kessler, who was named the starting quarterback during spring practice.

==== 2015 season ====
In 2015, Browne was once again the backup to Kessler.

==== 2016 season ====
With Kessler's departure to the NFL Draft after the 2015 season, Browne was the presumptive starter going into spring practice in 2016. Instead, he faced a stiff challenge from redshirt freshman Sam Darnold. On August 20, 2016, Browne was officially named the starting quarterback by head coach Clay Helton.

Browne started his first game as a Trojan quarterback in a 52–6 loss to Alabama on September 3. On September 19, Browne was replaced by Sam Darnold as starting quarterback, a move that prompted speculation that the redshirt junior would transfer at the end of the season to take advantage of his status as a graduate student to start immediately with a new team.

=== Pittsburgh ===
==== 2017 season ====
Browne eventually transferred to the University of Pittsburgh. At Pitt, Browne had a successful spring, being voted Captain and earning the starting quarterback job. However, after starting the first three games of the season and going 1–2 (beating Youngstown State but losing to both Penn State and Oklahoma State), Browne was replaced by redshirt sophomore Ben DiNucci. DiNucci went 12–19 with 1 touchdown in the Panthers next game, but the Panthers lost their third game of the season to Georgia Tech, 35–17. Browne was then given another shot to spark this offense for their game versus Rice and he did just that. Throwing for 410 yards, 28–32 (88% completion/attempts), and four touchdowns, the Panthers won 42–10.

On October 7, 2017, Browne suffered a shoulder injury on a sack during the game against Syracuse. It was later revealed that the injury required surgery and Browne would miss the rest of the season.

=== College statistics ===
| Year | Team | Games | | | Passing | | | | | | | | Rushing | | | |
| Year | Team | GP | GS | Record | Cmp | Att | Pct | Yds | Avg | TD | Int | Rtg | Att | Yds | Avg | TD |
|---|---|---|---|---|---|---|---|---|---|---|---|---|---|---|---|---|
| 2013 | USC | 0 | 0 | — | Redshirt | | | | | | | | | | | |
| 2014 | USC | 6 | 0 | — | 3 | 7 | 42.9 | 30 | 4.3 | 0 | 0 | 78.9 | 4 | 13 | 3.3 | 0 |
| 2015 | USC | 3 | 0 | — | 8 | 12 | 66.7 | 113 | 9.4 | 0 | 0 | 145.8 | 0 | 0 | 0.0 | 0 |
| 2016 | USC | 8 | 3 | 1–2 | 58 | 93 | 62.4 | 507 | 5.5 | 2 | 2 | 111.0 | 9 | −23 | −2.6 | 0 |
| 2017 | Pittsburgh | 6 | 5 | 2–3 | 96 | 135 | 71.1 | 997 | 7.4 | 5 | 2 | 142.4 | 19 | −74 | −3.9 | 0 |
| Career | | 26 | 8 | 3–5 | 165 | 247 | 66.8 | 1,647 | 6.7 | 7 | 4 | 128.9 | 32 | –84 | –2.6 | 0 |

== Professional career ==
Browne was not signed by a National Football League team after his college career ended. In December 2018, he attended a tryout with the Pittsburgh Steelers but was not offered a contract.

== Broadcasting career ==
During the 2018 college football season, he began analyzing Pac-12 Conference teams on YouTube with hopes of becoming a television color commentator.

In 2019, he became a pre- and post-game analyst for USC on KABC (AM), while also working as a contributor for TrojanSports.com. Browne later began calling games for CW Sports before joining ESPN in 2025.

== Personal life ==
Browne married former USC volleyball player and mental health & body image advocate Victoria Garrick on August 13, 2022.
