= Liberty High School (Washington) =

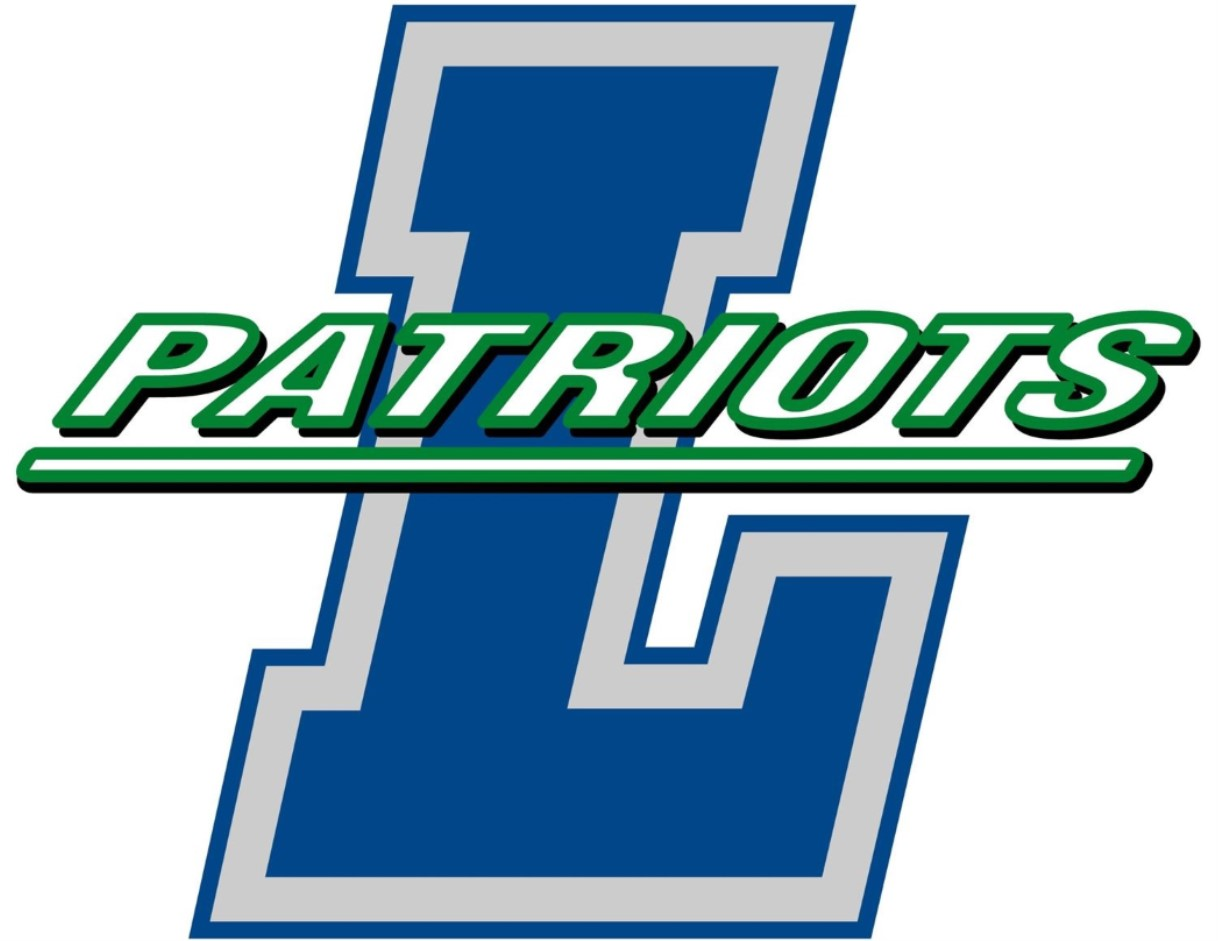

Location
- 16655 SE 136th St; Renton, WA 98059; United States; 47°28′47″N 122°07′06″W

Information
- Type: Public
- Established: 1977
- School district: Issaquah S.D.
- NCES School ID: 530375000576
- Principal: Andrew Brownson
- Teaching staff: 67.39 (on an FTE basis)
- Enrollment: 1,530 (2023-2024)
- Student to teacher ratio: 22.70
- Campus: Suburban
- Colors: Silver, Green, and Royal Blue
- Mascot: Patriot
- Rivals: Issaquah, Skyline, Hazen, Lake Washington
- Newspaper: The Patriot Press
- Awards: National Blue Ribbon School Award (1999-2000)
- Website: liberty.isd411.org

Liberty High School is a secondary school located in the East Renton Highlands in King County, Washington, United States. Founded in 1977, Liberty anchors the southern region of the Issaquah School District in the areas of Mirrormont, Issaquah, Four Lakes, May Valley, East Renton Highlands, Lakemont area of Bellevue, and the city of Newcastle. The school was named Liberty in celebration of the U.S. bicentennial celebration in 1976. After its naming, the bell from the research ship USS Liberty was acquired and is currently on display in the NJROTC (Navy Junior Reserve Officers' Training Corps) room and is used for NJROTC ceremonies.

Liberty works congruently with the Bellevue College's "College in the High School" program in Spanish and Pre-calculus which allows students to earn both high school and college credits through a different means than AP courses.

== National Blue Ribbon School ==
In the 1999–2000 school year, Liberty received the National Blue Ribbon School award of Excellence, the highest award an American school can achieve. Liberty was recognized at the national level in Washington DC on April 21, 1999. Representatives Edmonds, Kagi, Dickerson, Wensman, Ballasiotes, Pflug, Kenney, McIntire, Thomas, Hankins, Esser and Fortunato proclaimed,

"Whereas, Liberty High School encapsulates the ideals and beliefs that lie at the heart of the community it serves, and embraces core beliefs honoring personal dignity, quality and excellence in performance, moral and ethical courage, and individual capacity for flexibility and growth. BE IT FURTHER RESOLVED, That the House of Representatives encourage every student, parent, teacher, school, and community throughout the State of Washington to emulate the outstanding example and national recognition achieved by our National Blue Ribbon School."

== School achievements ==
Technology: Liberty is home to the Technology Information Project (T.I.P.), a nationally recognized educational program promoting the use of computers in the high school setting. Due to the work of Michael Booky and Donald Robertson, this program promoted the teaching of computer science and information technology by having students run the district's network. See The Issaquah Miracle for more information.

Performing Arts: The Patriot Players Drama Club is very active at Liberty High, typically performing four major productions per year: two plays, a musical, and Liberty's own Student-Directed One Acts Festival.

Liberty's Drama Department received top honors in 2006, as one of the best schools for theater productions in the state. The Patriot Players received numerous accolades at the 5th Avenue High School Musical Theatre Awards for their production of "Seussical." Designed as a high school version of the Tony Awards, the 5th Avenue Awards program honors high school students throughout Washington who put on quality musical theater entertainment. All nominees are invited to the annual awards show at the 5th Avenue Theatre in Seattle. In addition to being asked to perform on stage during the ceremony, the Patriot Players won Best Chorus and Best Costume Design. Teacher Katherine Klekas took home Best Director. Seussical was also nominated in eight other categories: Outstanding Overall Musical Production, Outstanding Performance by an Ensemble Group, Outstanding Choreography, Outstanding Music Direction, Outstanding Orchestra, Outstanding Lighting Design, Outstanding Hair and Makeup Design, and Outstanding Stage Crew.

- More recently, the Patriot Players received ten nominations and two honorable mentions for their Spring 2010 production of "Into the Woods.".
- In 2012, the Liberty drama program was recognized as the best musical program in the state by the 5th Avenue Awards Program. Liberty High School won for Outstanding Overall Musical Performance, Outstanding Music Direction (Robin Wood), Outstanding Performance by an Actor in a Supporting Role (Jeremy Dodd), and Outstanding Scenic Design for their production of Little Shop of Horrors.
- In 2013 the Patriot Players received 9 nominations, winning Outstanding Scenic Design for their production if The Wizard Of Oz at the 5th Aves.

Culinary Arts: Liberty was also named the top culinary art school in the State of Washington during the 2004–2005, 2005–2006, 2006–2007 and 2009–2010 school year. Liberty's culinary program went on to compete at the national level in North Carolina and became a well-known program around the nation. The team defended their title in March during this year's state championship. The Culinary Arts Program follows the ProStart curriculum designed by the National Restaurant Education Foundation. Students are eligible to earn 15 college credits through the Tech Prep program as they learn culinary techniques and business skills, then practice those skills by running a restaurant in the school. Students have earned top honors and scholarships at local, state, and national competitions.

Patriot Press: Liberty's newspaper, "The Patriot Press", has been ranked as the best high school newspaper in the state of Washington during the 02–03, 03–04, 04–05, 05–06, 06-07 and 07-08 school years. The Patriot Press Staff recently won two scholastic journalism awards: Honorable mention in the overall excellence category of the Edward R. Murrow journalism contest at Washington State University and first place for overall newspaper excellence in the Washington Chapter of the Society of Professional Journalists contest.

Liberty Band: In February 2009 the Liberty High School Marching Band competed in the KZOK and Rock Wood Fired Pizza sponsored Battle of the High School Bands, featured on the Bob Rivers Show. With over 40 other schools in the puget sound area competing, their music video entry won the Grand Prize of $10,000. Bob Rivers referred to the Liberty Band as "One of the top, elite band programs in the state".

Robotics Club: Liberty's robotics club is a member of FIRST Robotics Competition as team 4131. The team was started in 2010 and has been to multiple competitions, including the PNW Autodesk Portland regional competition in 2013.

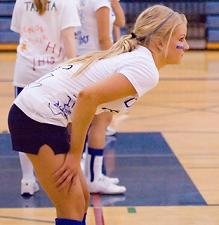
Volleyball

== Academics and rankings ==
Test Scores:

2012-13 MSP/HSPE Results
	Reading	Math	Writing	Science
10th Grade Meeting Standard	94%	94%	96%	94%

U.S. News & World Report:

- In 2020, the U.S. News & World Report ranked Liberty in the silver category as the #1,290 best high school in the United States (17,792 total ranked) and #20 best in Washington.
- In 2016, the U.S. News & World Report ranked Liberty in the silver category as the #904 best high school in the United States (21,000 total ranked) and #11 best in Washington.
- In 2014, the U.S. News & World Report ranked Liberty in the silver category as the #768 best high school in the United States and #15 best in Washington.

Niche.com:

- In the 2022 Niche (company) rankings of best high schools in Washington State, Liberty was ranked #16 out of 419 schools to be scored. Liberty also ranked #841 in the US out of 19,984 schools, and #630 for college prep.
- In the 2021, Niche recognized Liberty as the #16 best high school in the state, out of 419 schools to be scored. Liberty also ranked #705 in the US out of 19,532 schools.
- In 2019 and 2020, Niche recognized Liberty as the #15 best high school in the state of Washington out of 422 schools to be ranked.
- In 2019, Niche also ranked Liberty as the 612th best high school in America. Rankings were based on a total of 19,314 schools.

School Digger:

- Rated in the top 2% of Washington high schools, Liberty is ranked the 13th out of 433 schools in 2012 by Schooldigger.com. Rankings are based on public and private school test scores.

Business Week:

- In 2009, Businessweek and Greatschools.org recognized Liberty as the #1 "parents choice" high school in the state of Washington.

Evergreen Foundation:

- According to the Evergreen Freedom Foundation, Liberty ranks 20th of 346 public and private high schools in the State of Washington. Rankings are published by the Fraser Institute, which compares test scores, curriculum, and graduation rates.

== Athletics ==
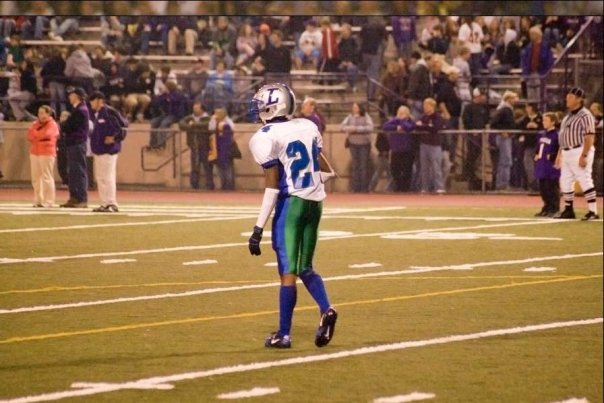
Liberty Football Player

Liberty High School is a member of the 2A / 3A Kingco Athletic Conference and Washington Interscholastic Activities Association. Liberty's sports teams have a combined 22 state titles and one national title in drill.

Competitive Cheer

Liberty won the 2025 2A/3A large gameday routine state title, their first team championship for cheer.

Track and Field

Liberty won the 2025 boys' track and field state title.

Drill Team

In 2016, the Liberty drill team was awarded National Champion in the military category. Liberty's most recent state title came in 2019 when Liberty's Drill team took home the first-place trophy in Military. They won a state title every year from 2015 through 2019.

=== Football ===
The football team won the 2A state title in 1988 and came in second place to Bellevue in 2009 and Archbishop Murphy in 2016. KingCo 2A/3A Conference Champion 2018.

=== Men's Golf ===
Liberty won the 2016 and 2017 2A Men's Golf State Title.

=== Women's cross-country ===
Liberty won the 2015 2A Cross-Country state title.

=== Baseball ===
Liberty's Baseball won the state title in 200 3. The team's most recognized alumnus, Tim Lincecum, was the 2008 and 2009 Cy Young Award recipient as the top Major League pitcher in the National League. He most-notably played for the San Francisco Giants.

=== Women's soccer ===
Liberty's Women's Soccer team won the 3A State Title in 2013, and the 2A title in 2017 and 2018.

=== Women's Swim and Dive ===
Liberty's Women's Swim and Dive team won the 2A State Title in 2015, 2016 and 2017.

=== Softball ===
The softball team holds a record for state championship appearances at 12 years in a row (1996–2007), the most out of any sport of any school in the states history. Liberty has won two state titles, one in 2025 and the other in 1993.

=== Men's soccer ===
In 1999, the Liberty men's soccer team was ranked 12th in the nation by CBS Sports. They won the state title in 1986.

== Notable alumni ==
- Cody Baker — (class of 2022) Professional soccer player for the Seattle Sounders FC and Tacoma Defiance.
- Arlene Baxter — (class of 1980) American model for Victoria's Secret, Saks Fifth Avenue and was a Playmate of the Month, December, 1993. She was one of only 13 women over the age of 30 to become a Playmate.
- Mkristo Bruce — (class of 2002) Football defensive end for the Jacksonville Jaguars and graduate from Washington State University. He was an assistant coach for Liberty's 2010–2011 football team.
- Chad Gardner — Lead singer and songwriter for the band Kings Kaleidoscope.
- Sean Kinney — (class of 1984) Drummer for the grunge band, Alice in Chains.
- Tim Lincecum — (class of 2003) Most recently played for the Los Angeles Angels and member of the Giants for their 2010, 2012, and 2014 World Series Championship teams. Cy Young Award recipient.

== History and facilities ==
Liberty opened in 1977 as a senior high school (grades 10–12, although without a senior class the first year), and became a four-year high school (gr. 9–12) in 1984. The school was completely renovated in 1999 and was rebuilt in 2015. The school colors of silver, green, and blue were chosen to replicate those used by the Seattle Seahawks, whose first season was in 1976. The colors were selected over red, white, and blue by a vote from the student body. The school is home to the Ray Reeves Gymnasium.

=== 2011–2015 renovation ===
Liberty opened a new school in the Fall of 2015 at a total cost of $86 million-dollars. The new facility, which was completed in 2015, is one of the most eco-friendly schools in the state of Washington. Green features include refillable water fountains, recycled building materials, and two live green walls. Phase I construction began in 2011, which included a $20 million addition and modernization project which passed the February 7, 2006 ballot measure for the Issaquah School District. The master plan for the campus is a series of buildings set around four exterior courts. By the fall of 2015, Liberty opened two new classroom wings, a library, two science classrooms, an additional auxiliary gym, weight room, tennis courts, expansion of the core facilities, an expanded cafeteria with a kitchen, administration and counseling wings, an entry courtyard/lobby, and a 600-seat state-of-the-art performing arts center that includes a 100-seat black box, music, band and orchestra rooms. The gym area of the school was the only portion of the original campus left intact. See Phase I, II, and III of the Schematic Plans as of April 2010 prepared by the architects for the expansion Bassetti Architects.

=== 2015-2021 Athletic facilities renovations ===
In addition to the complete school remodel, the football stadium has a new home-side facility that includes 2,000 seats for spectators, a new press box, a covered roof, and new artificial turf that was completed in 2015. At a cost of $5 million, the new stadium capacity has doubled to 3,100 spectators. In 2020, a horseshoe building will be built at the south end of the track that will contain team meeting rooms, restrooms, a new video board, coaches offices, support facilities, and concessions. See the football Stadium Plans as of May 2011. Total cost for the 2020 stadium improvements will be $3 million.

The Liberty baseball and softball fields also underwent renovations. The existing infield sand was replaced with artificial turf and the surrounding stadium also received renovations.

As part of the school renovation project, the sports teams also gained a new auxiliary gym, weight room, tennis courts and Athletic Training Room that overlooks the football field.

=== Green Technology School ===
On May 4, 2010, science teacher Mark Buchli introduced Liberty High's new solar panel to an audience that included state legislators, Puget Sound Energy and Issaquah Schools Foundation officials, and school board members. In addition to providing the school clean energy, the solar panel will allow classrooms to conduct hands-on experiments and demonstrations—and perhaps inspire a new generation of scientists to better harness the vast energy potential of the sun. The grants to Liberty will provide an opportunity for students to compare the efficiency of tracking solar arrays, which have the ability to turn and follow the sun. The panel was funded by a grant from Puget Sound Energy with additional funding for the revolving pedestal from the Issaquah Schools Foundation.

As part of the completed renovation, Liberty's new facilities will include features like reusable water from green/planted roofs, geothermal heating, usable fans in all classrooms, composting, and light shelves on the building's exterior windows.

== Feeder schools ==
Secondary schools:

- Maywood Middle School
- Cougar Mountain Middle School

Elementary schools:

- Apollo Elementary School
- Briarwood Elementary School
- Maple Hills Elementary School
- Newcastle Elementary School
