= Joe Tryon-Shoyinka =

American football player (born 1999)

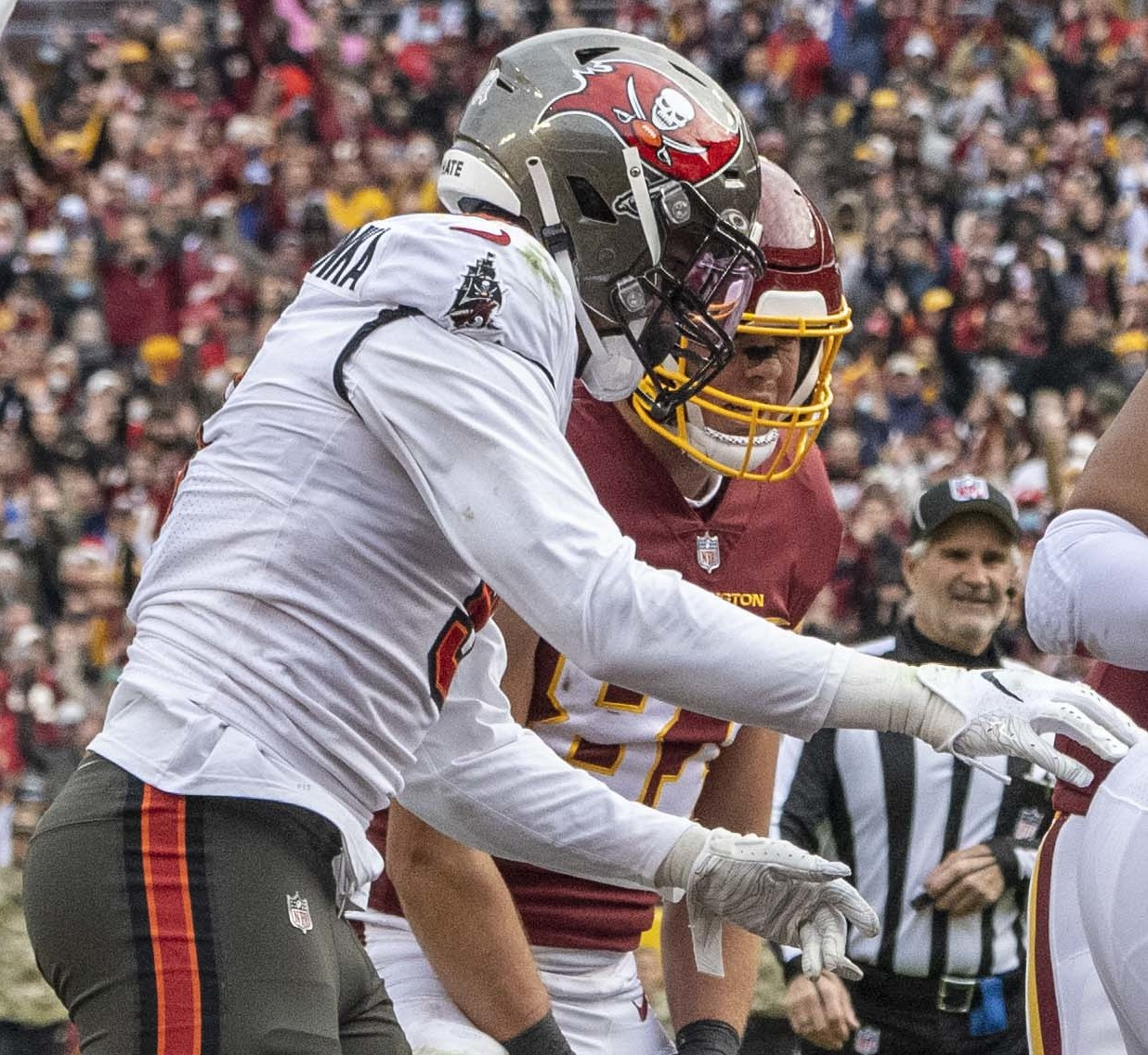
- Tryon-Shoyinka with the Tampa Bay Buccaneers in 2021

No. 9, 90, 93
- Position: Linebacker

Personal information
- Born: April 30, 1999 (age 27); Seattle, Washington, U.S.
- Listed height: 6 ft 5 in (1.96 m)
- Listed weight: 259 lb (117 kg)

Career information
- High school: Hazen (Renton, Washington)
- College: Washington (2017–2020)
- NFL draft: 2021: 1st round, 32nd overall pick

Career history
- Tampa Bay Buccaneers (2021–2024); Cleveland Browns (2025); Chicago Bears (2025); Philadelphia Eagles (2026)*
- * Offseason or practice squad member only

Awards and highlights
- Second-team All-Pac-12 (2019)

Career NFL statistics
- Total tackles: 160
- Sacks: 15.0
- Forced fumbles: 2
- Fumble recoveries: 1
- Pass deflections: 8
- Stats at Pro Football Reference

Joe Tryon-Shoyinka (born April 30, 1999) is an American former professional football player who was a linebacker in the National Football League (NFL) for five seasons. He played college football for the Washington Huskies and was selected by the Tampa Bay Buccaneers in the first round of the 2021 NFL draft. He has also played in the NFL for the Cleveland Browns and Chicago Bears.

== Early life ==
Tryon-Shoyinka was born in Seattle and grew up in nearby Renton, Washington, and attended Hazen High School, where he played baseball, basketball and football. As a senior, he was named regional defensive lineman of the year by The Seattle Times. A 3-star defensive end recruit, Tryon-Shoyinka originally committed to play college football for the Washington State Cougars but changed it to attend the University of Washington over offers from Eastern Washington, Oregon, and Utah.

== College career ==
Tryon-Shoyinka redshirted his true freshman season at the University of Washington. As a redshirt freshman, he played in 12 games with 20 tackles, two tackles for loss and one sack. Tryon-Shoyinka made 41 tackles with 12.5 tackles for loss and eight sacks in his redshirt sophomore season and was named second-team All-Pac-12 Conference. Following the Pac-12's original announcement that they would postpone the 2020 season due to the COVID-19 pandemic, Tryon-Shoyinka announced that he would prepare for the 2021 NFL draft.

== Professional career ==
Pre-draft measurables
Height	Weight	Arm length	Hand span	Wingspan	40-yard dash	10-yard split	20-yard split	20-yard shuttle	Three-cone drill	Vertical jump	Broad jump	Bench press
6 ft 5 in (1.96 m)	259 lb (117 kg)	34 in (0.86 m)	10 1/4 in (0.26 m)	6 ft 10 3/4 in (2.10 m)	4.68 s	1.64 s	2.69 s	4.36 s	7.18 s	35.0 in (0.89 m)	9 ft 8 in (2.95 m)	22 reps
All values from Pro Day

=== Tampa Bay Buccaneers ===
Tryon-Shoyinka was selected in the first round (32nd overall) of the 2021 NFL draft by the defending Super Bowl champion Tampa Bay Buccaneers. He signed his four-year rookie contract, worth $11 million, on June 22, 2021.

On April 30, 2024, the Buccaneers declined the fifth-year option on Tryon-Shoyinka's contract, making him a free agent after the 2024 season.

=== Cleveland Browns ===
On March 12, 2025, Tryon-Shoyinka agreed to terms with the Cleveland Browns on a one-year, $4.75 million contract. He made eight appearances for Cleveland, recording nine combined tackles.

=== Chicago Bears ===
On November 4, 2025, Tryon-Shoyinka was traded along with a seventh-round pick in 2026 to the Chicago Bears in exchange for a sixth-round pick in 2026.

=== Philadelphia Eagles ===
On March 30, 2026, Tryon-Shoyinka signed a one-year contract with the Philadelphia Eagles. On June 16, Tryon-Shoyinka retired from professional football.

== NFL career statistics ==
Season	Team	Games		Tackles				Interceptions						Fumbles		
Season	Team	Total	Starter	Total	Solo	Assist	Sacks	PD	Int	Yards	Average	Long	TD	FF	FR	TD
2021	TB	17	6	29	21	8	4.0	3	0	0	0.0	0	0	0	0	0
2022	TB	17	16	40	23	17	4.0	2	0	0	0.0	0	0	0	0	0
2023	TB	17	12	45	28	17	5.0	1	0	0	0.0	0	0	1	1	0
2024	TB	15	11	24	15	9	2.0	2	0	0	0.0	0	0	1	0	0
2025	CLE	8	0	9	5	4	0.0	0	0	0	0.0	0	0	0	0	0
2025	CHI	8	0	13	5	8	0.0	0	0	0	0.0	0	0	0	0	0
Career		82	45	160	97	63	15.0	8	0	0	0.0	0	0	2	1	0
