= Carson Bruener =

American football player (born 2001)

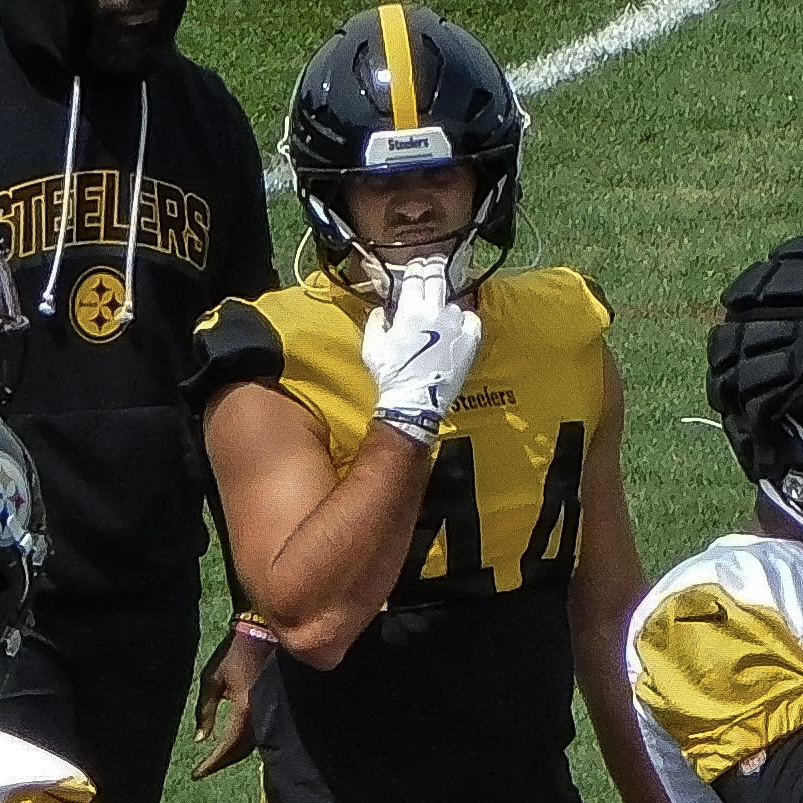
- Bruener with the Pittsburgh Steelers in 2025

No. 44 – Pittsburgh Steelers
- Position: Linebacker
- Roster status: Active

Personal information
- Born: June 5, 2001 (age 25); Woodinville, Washington, U.S.
- Listed height: 6 ft 1 in (1.85 m)
- Listed weight: 227 lb (103 kg)

Career information
- High school: Redmond (Redmond, Washington)
- College: Washington (2020–2024)
- NFL draft: 2025: 7th round, 226th overall pick

Career history
- Pittsburgh Steelers (2025–present)

Awards and highlights
- PFWA All-Rookie Team (2025); Third-team All-Big Ten (2024)

Career NFL statistics as of Week 7, 2026
- Tackles: 26
- Stats at Pro Football Reference

Carson Bruener (born June 5, 2001) is an American professional football linebacker for the Pittsburgh Steelers of the National Football League (NFL). He played college football for the Washington Huskies and was selected by the Steelers in the seventh round of the 2025 NFL draft.

== Early life ==
Bruener attended Redmond High School. He was rated as a three-star recruit and committed to play college football for the Washington Huskies.

== College career ==
In his first career game in week 3 of the 2021 season, Bruener made eight tackles and forced a fumble in a win over Arkansas State. In week 9, he earned his first career start versus Stanford, where he finished with 16 tackles with one and a half being for a loss, a sack and a half, and a forced fumble en route to being named the Pac-12 Conference freshman of the week and the Pac-12 defensive player of the week. In his first collegiate season in 2021, Bruener totaled 70 tackles with two and a half being for a loss, a sack and a half, two forced fumbles, and an interception.

In the 2022 season, he tallied 45 tackles with three and a half being for a loss, and a pass deflections. In week 12 of the 2023 season, Bruener recorded 14 tackles, a forced fumble, and a pass deflection in a win over Oregon State.

During the 2023 season, he notched 86 tackles with two and a half being for a loss, three pass deflections, an interception, and a forced fumble, earning honorable mention all-Pac-12 accolades.

In 2024 Bruener was voted a team captain and started all 13 games. He led the UW defense with 103 tackles and three interceptions. Bruener's outstanding play was recognized with third-team All-Big Ten by the coaches and media. He also was named to the Academic All-Big Ten team.

== Professional career ==
Pre-draft measurables
Height	Weight	Arm length	Hand span	Wingspan	40-yard dash	10-yard split	20-yard split	20-yard shuttle	Three-cone drill	Vertical jump	Broad jump
6 ft 1 1/4 in (1.86 m)	227 lb (103 kg)	31 3/4 in (0.81 m)	9 1/4 in (0.23 m)	6 ft 6 1/4 in (1.99 m)	4.58 s	1.57 s	2.68 s	4.24 s	6.77 s	33.5 in (0.85 m)	9 ft 11 in (3.02 m)
All values from NFL Combine/Pro Day

Bruener was selected by the Pittsburgh Steelers with the 226th pick in the seventh round of the 2025 NFL draft. He made his professional debut in a 34–32 Week 1 victory over the New York Jets. During the win, he recorded his first professional tackle.

== Personal life ==
Bruener is the son of former NFL first round pick and Steelers tight end Mark Bruener.
