= Eastlake High School (Washington) =

Coordinates: 47°36′49″N 122°01′52″W

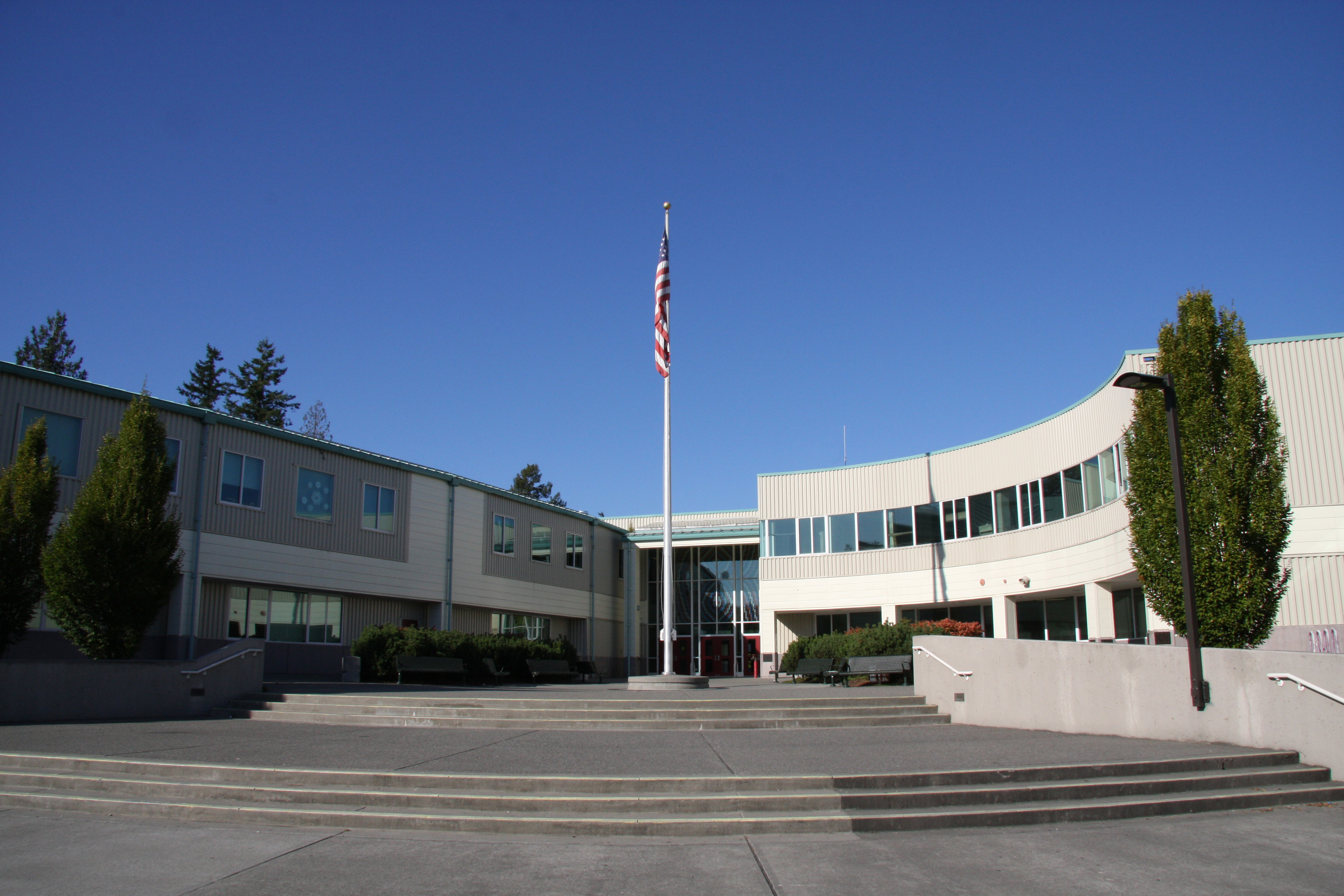
- Main entrance in 2005
- 400 228th Avenue Northeast; Sammamish, Washington; U.S.

Information
- Type: Public, four-year
- Motto: Wolf Strong Pack Strong
- Established: 1993
- School district: Lake Washington S.D.
- Principal: Todd Apple
- Teaching staff: 111.32 (on an FTE basis)
- Grades: 9–12 (10–12 until Sep 2012)
- Enrollment: 2,367 (2023–2024)
- Student to teacher ratio: 21.26
- Campus: Small Town
- Colors: Crimson, gray and white
- Athletics: WIAA Class 4A
- Athletics conference: KingCo 4A, Crown Division
- Mascot: Wolf
- Newspaper: Wolves Weekly Update
- Feeder schools: Evergreen Middle School; Inglewood Middle School; Timberline Middle School
- Website: ehs.lwsd.org

Eastlake High School is a four-year public high school in Sammamish, Washington, a suburb east of Seattle. It shares its campus with the Renaissance School of Art and Reasoning.

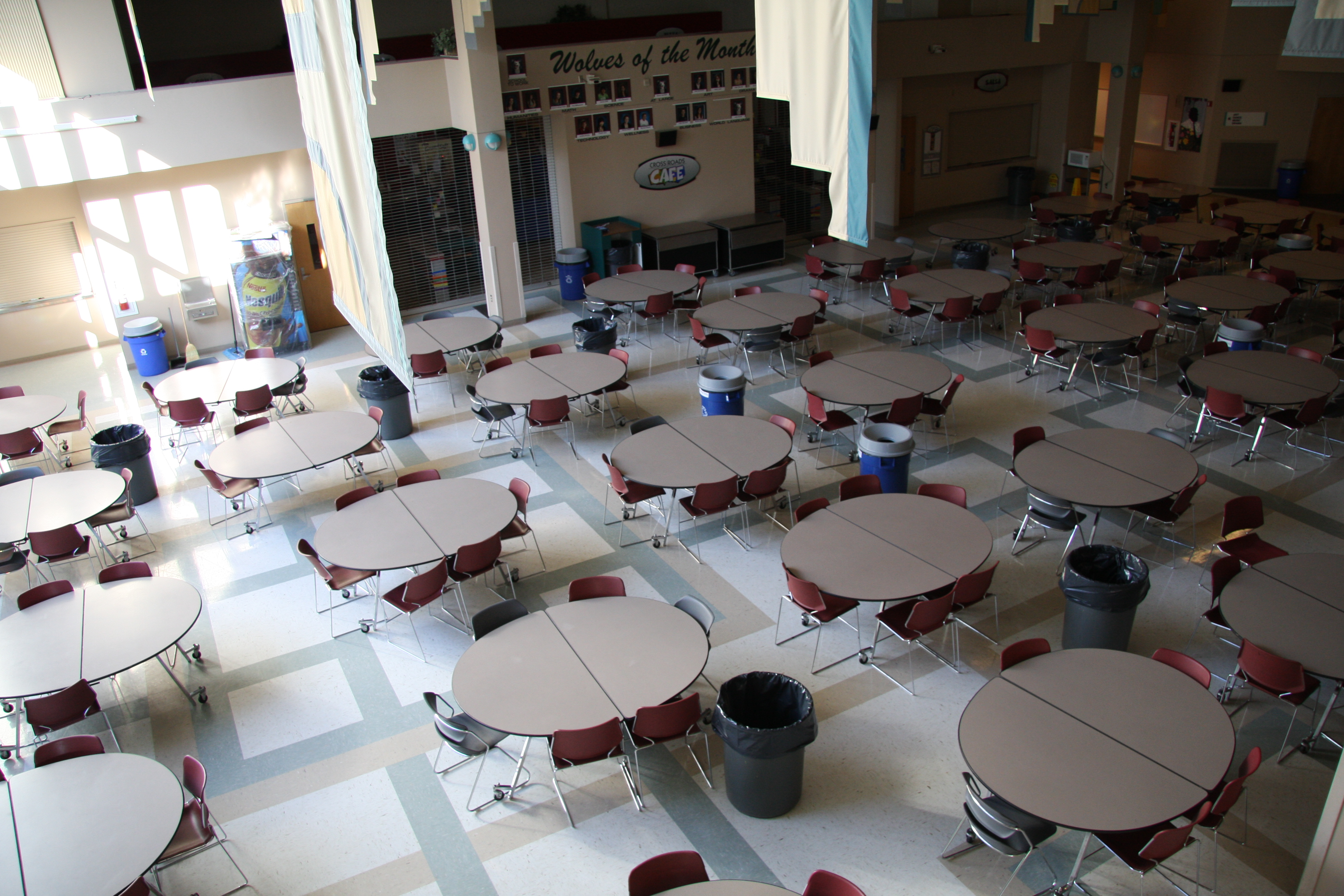
Cafeteria, Eastlake High School, Sammamish, Washington

Eastlake is one of three high schools on the Sammamish Plateau, all close in proximity along 228th Avenue. Skyline High School, in the Issaquah School District, opened in 1997 and is about 1-mile (1.6 km) south of Eastlake. Between the two public high schools is Eastside Catholic, a private secondary school that relocated to Sammamish in 2008.

In the fall of 2012, Lake Washington School District converted its four senior high schools (grades 10–12) to four-year schools (grades 9–12), moving the freshman class for the first time from the Jr. High to the district's High School.

== Academics ==
Eastlake offers honors and Advanced Placement (AP) academic programs to prepare students for upper-division and college-level courses. Foreign languages offered at Eastlake High School include Spanish, French, Japanese, and American Sign Language.

Eastlake participates in the Running Start program. Eastlake students in the 11th or 12th grade can enroll in college-level courses at Bellevue College, CWU Sammamish, Cascadia College, or Lake Washington Institute of Technology and earn high school and college credit concurrently. The Lake Washington School District pays the college tuition for a specified number of credits taken; students are usually responsible for fees, books, and transportation.

== Extracurricular ==
=== Athletics ===
Completed in January 2006, the school has a multi-purpose sports facility. It features two lighted synthetic surface fields operated by the city of Sammamish in cooperation with the school district. The 400-ft by 350-ft field accommodates baseball, softball, Frisbee, lacrosse, and soccer activities for adults and students year-round.

=== Academics ===
Eastlake students received Presidential Scholar awards in 2003, 2008, and 2010.

Eastlake High School has a number of clubs and student organizations. These include a number of honor societies such as Computer Science Honor Society, Physics Honor Society, National Honor Society, Math Honor Society, French Honor Society, Spanish Honor Society and Science National Honor Society, as well as career and technical organizations (CTSOs) like TSA, DECA and HOSA, whose chapters send a number of competitors to internationals every year. During the 2018-19 school year, 29 students competed at DECA's ICDC, while 25 students competed at HOSA's ILC. In 2020, Eastlake High School students were elected to represent Washington state at TSA and HOSA.

Eastlake was the only school in the district to have a FIRST Robotics Competition robotics team (in 2016 a team at Lake Washington High School was founded). The team, formerly known as Top Gun and rebranded in 2020 as Pack of Parts (1294), started in 2004. They qualified for the first time to go to the World Championship in 2014. Again, they qualified and competed in the quarterfinals of the Newton division in 2017.

In 2018, the orchestra was nominated for Outstanding Performance by an Orchestra by the 5th Avenue Theatre for Mary Poppins.

== Notable alumni ==
- Curtis Borchardt, professional basketball player
- Nick Downing, retired professional soccer player
- Blake Hawksworth, professional baseball player
- Ryan Lewis, professional football player
- Rian Lindell, former NFL kicker, is a physical education teacher and football coach in Eastlake.
- Surf Mesa, singer Powell Aguirre
- Marin Morrison, an American para-swimmer who competed at the 2008 Summer Paralympics in Beijing
- Chad Orvella, former MLB player (Tampa Bay Rays)
