= Gibson Ek High School =

High school in Washington, United States

Coordinates: 47.5267°N 122.0343°W

Gibson Ek High School is a four-year public secondary school in Issaquah, Washington, United States, a suburb east of Seattle. It is one of five high schools in the Issaquah School District. It opened in the fall of 2016 at the previous location of Issaquah Middle School. Gibson Ek is a choice high school that places emphasis on real-world learning. Gibson Ek students are allowed to explore career options with the help of volunteer mentors and are required to go to internships on Tuesdays and Thursdays.
