= Bellevue College =

Community college in Bellevue, Washington, US

Coordinates: 47°35′06″N 122°08′57″W

- Type: Public college
- Established: 1966
- President: David May
- Faculty: 918
- Administrative staff: 591
- Students: 19,749
- Location: Bellevue, Washington, United States
- Campus: Main campus - 100 acres North Campus - 2 acres
- Mascot: Bulldogs
- Website: www.bellevuecollege.edu

Bellevue College (BC) is a public college in Bellevue, Washington. Created in 1966, the school is the largest of the 34 institutions that make up the Washington Community and Technical Colleges (SBCTC) system and the third-largest institution of higher education in the state (behind the University of Washington and Washington State University).

== History ==
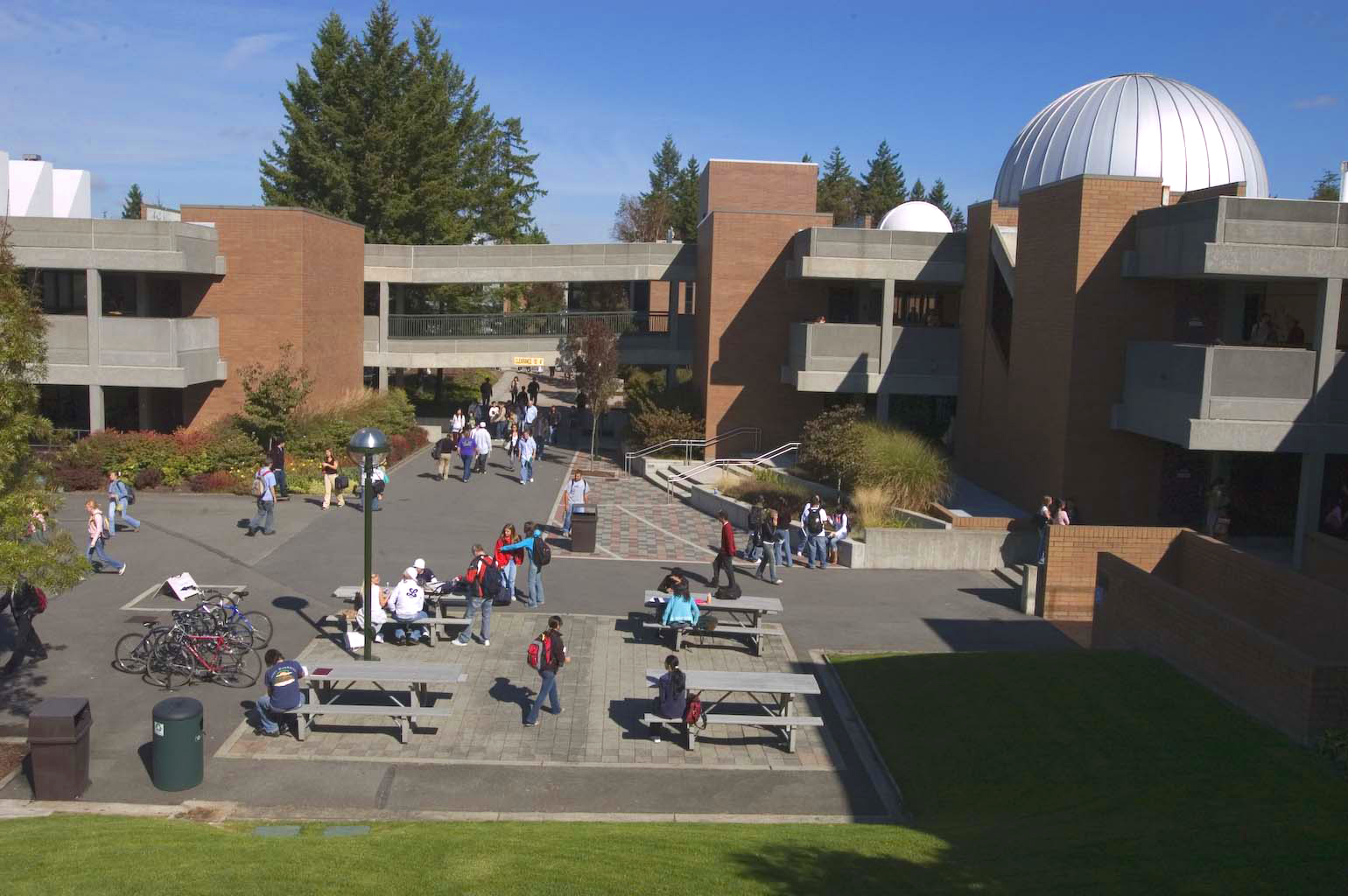
Main campus (2005)

Residents of several school districts on the east side of the Seattle metropolitan area created a planning committee in 1957 to explore starting a community college. In 1962, a $575,000 levy was passed by voters to start the college, with the state providing $30,000 in grant money for the project in 1965. Bellevue Community College then opened on January 3, 1966, with classes originally held at what was then Newport Senior High School. What was later re-named as the main campus, opened in 1968. The school added a bachelor's of applied science in radiation and imaging sciences in 2006. In 2009, the school changed its name to Bellevue College.

In February 2020, BC unveiled "Never Again Is Now", a mural by artist Erin Shigaki that depicts two Japanese American children who were sent to internment camps during World War II. The mural's caption included a reference to Bellevue businessman Miller Freeman, a prominent anti-Japanese activist, which was removed by Vice President of Institutional Advancement Gayle Colston Barge. The change in caption sparked outcry from students and the Asian American community, resulting in Barge being placed on administrative leave. Barge and BC President Jerry Weber, who defended her actions, announced their resignations on March 2.

Former Washington governor Gary Locke was named the college's interim president on May 28, 2020. Locke was the 21st governor of Washington and later served in the Obama Administration as U.S. Secretary of Commerce and as the tenth ambassador to China. He served as BC president until July 2023. In 2023, Dr. David May was selected president. He has decades of experience in higher education.

== Academics ==
The institution offers transfer associate degree programs, bachelor's degree programs, professional-technical degrees and certifications, a continuing education program, pre-college programs for high school students, basic education for adults, parent education, and workforce development. The main campus sits on 100 acres (40 ha) just north of Interstate 90 at about 148th Avenue SE, while the north campus is 2 acres (0.81 ha) near Washington State Route 520 at 148th Avenue NE.

Most classes at BC have a 22:1 students to faculty ratio. BC is ranked No. 13 for best online learning in the U.S. and is ranked No. 1 for best community college in Washington by Academic Influence. BC also offers specialized education degrees and support programs for students with disabilities and accessibility needs.

BC's service district includes the public school districts of Bellevue, Issaquah, Mercer Island, Skykomish and Snoqualmie Valley. The current president of BC is David May, who previously served as interim president of Eastern Washington University.

== Campus life ==
Many student organizations and clubs operate on campus and organize events, including theatrical performances and outdoor wellness center classes.

BC Residence Hall hosts up to 400 students to live on campus. It provides suites and apartments style and amenities such as community space, laundry facility, Wi-fi access, food services as well as free cultural and academic activities to help students build communities. Living on campus can help students further enrich their college experience.

== Campus media ==
BC operates an FM radio station, KBCS, from its campus. The station was founded by students and began broadcasting in 1973 with a 10-watt system. The station upgraded to a 100-watt system after receiving an equipment donation from KING-FM; it now broadcasts from Cougar Mountain. KBCS is primarily listener-supported, with two-thirds of its budget coming from listener donations; the balance comes from the Corporation for Public Broadcasting and sponsorships from local businesses and organizations. KBCS has since grown to comprise a full-time staff and a large roster of community volunteers; it transitioned from solely broadcasting music to adding news and public affairs beginning in 2009. BC broadcasts select classes, lectures, games involving BC athletic teams, and other programming via its television station, called the College Channel.

The Watchdog is the student newspaper for BC. It has been published weekly since 1967 and covers local news, college issues, and campus life and events The newspaper receives its funding from the BC Services and Activities committee in addition to print and digital advertisements.

== Notable people ==
- Duane Davidson, politician
- Jaime Herrera Beutler, politician
- Chris Cole, professional soccer player
- Danny Faundez, professional soccer player
- Miranda Granger, mixed martial artist
- Hawa Hassan, author and chef
- Keana Hunter, artistic swimmer
- Evan Meek, professional baseball player
- Ian Parmley, professional baseball player
- Amin Shaykho, businessman
- Austin Shenton, professional baseball player
