= Kasen Williams =

American football player (born 1992)

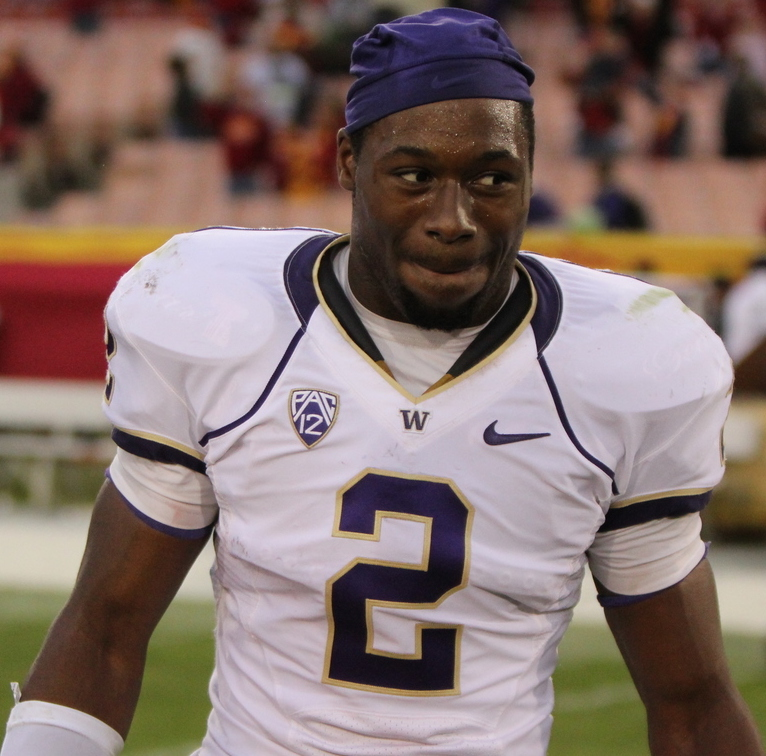
- Williams with Washington in 2011

No. 18, 82
- Position: Wide receiver

Personal information
- Born: December 5, 1992 (age 33); Seattle, Washington, U.S.
- Listed height: 6 ft 1 in (1.85 m)
- Listed weight: 219 lb (99 kg)

Career information
- High school: Skyline (Sammamish, Washington)
- College: Washington (2011–2014)
- NFL draft: 2015: undrafted

Career history
- Cincinnati Bengals (2015)*; Seattle Seahawks (2015–2016); Cleveland Browns (2017); Indianapolis Colts (2018)*; Seattle Dragons (2020)
- * Offseason or practice squad member only

Career NFL statistics
- Receptions: 10
- Receiving yards: 92
- Stats at Pro Football Reference

Kasen Williams (born December 5, 1992) is an American former professional football player who was a wide receiver in the National Football League (NFL). He played college football for the Washington Huskies.

== Early life ==
Williams attended Skyline High School in Sammamish, Washington, east of Seattle, where he lettered in football, track, and basketball. He received numerous awards in high school, including the Parade All-America National Player of the Year, MaxPreps.com's National Player of the Year, and was also named a first-team All-American by USA Today, ESPN, and Maxpreps.com. After receiving multiple offers from other major programs, Williams committed to Washington just prior to his senior year at Skyline on August 27, 2010.

College recruiting
Name	Hometown	School	Height	Weight	40^{‡}	Commit date
Kasen Williams; WR	Sammamish, Washington	Skyline High School	6 ft 1 in (1.85 m)	197 lb (89 kg)	4.60	Aug 28, 2010
Kasen Williams; WR	Recruit ratings: Scout: Rivals: 247Sports:					
Overall recruit ranking: Scout: 2 (WR) Rivals: 13 (WR), 2 (Washington)
‡ Refers to 40-yard dash; Note: In many cases, Scout, Rivals, 247Sports, On3, and ESPN may conflict in their listings of height, weight and 40 time.; In these cases, the average was taken. ESPN grades are on a 100-point scale.; Sources: "2011 Team Ranking". Rivals.com.

== College career ==
As a true freshman at Washington in 2011, Williams appeared in all 13 games as a wide receiver and punt returner. He finished the season with 36 receptions for 427 yards and 6 touchdowns. In 2012, Williams started every game as a sophomore and earned honorable mention All-Pac-12 honors. He totaled 77 catches, earning him third place on the Huskies' all-time single-season reception list, and tallied 878 receiving yards and 6 touchdowns. As a junior in 2013, he started every game until a season-ending broken fibula against California in late October. Head coach Steve Sarkisian departed that December and was succeeded by Chris Petersen. Williams played in every game in his senior season in 2014, starting six; he finished with a career-low 20 receptions for 189 yards and 2 touchdowns.

== Professional career ==
Due to not receiving an invitation to the NFL Combine in 2015, Williams received minimal attention from professional scouts.

Pre-draft measurables
Height	Weight	Arm length	Hand span	Wingspan	40-yard dash	10-yard split	20-yard split	20-yard shuttle	Three-cone drill	Vertical jump	Broad jump	Bench press
6 ft 1 1/2 in (1.87 m)	218 lb (99 kg)	32 5/8 in (0.83 m)	9 1/4 in (0.23 m)	6 ft 5 3/8 in (1.97 m)	4.63 s	1.64 s	2.67 s	4.47 s	7.05 s	35.5 in (0.90 m)	9 ft 11 in (3.02 m)	17 reps
All values from the University of Washington Pro Day

=== Cincinnati Bengals ===
Unselected in the 2015 NFL draft, Williams signed with the Cincinnati Bengals shortly after, but was released in May after a failed physical.

=== Seattle Seahawks ===
The Seattle Seahawks signed Williams to a rookie mini-camp contract, where he impressed coaches with his sure-handed catching ability, and he was signed by the team on June 12, 2015, but released on September 5. The next day, on September 6, he was signed to their practice squad. On December 26, Williams was signed to the Seahawks' 53-man roster, replacing tight end Anthony McCoy who was put on injured reserve.

On September 3, 2016, Williams was released by the Seahawks as part of final roster cuts, and was then signed to their practice squad. On September 13, he was released from the Seahawks' practice squad, then re-signed to the practice squad on September 21. On December 27, he was promoted to the Seahawks' active roster to replace the injured Tyler Lockett.

In 2017, Williams caught four passes for 119 yards in his first preseason game on August 13, and caught a touchdown the next week against the Minnesota Vikings. Despite a strong preseason, Williams was waived by the Seahawks on September 2.

=== Cleveland Browns ===
The following day on September 3, 2017, Williams was claimed off waivers by the Cleveland Browns, but was waived on November 16 and was re-signed to their practice squad. He signed a reserve/future contract with the Browns on January 1, 2018, but was waived on April 30.

=== Indianapolis Colts ===
Williams signed with the Indianapolis Colts on May 11, 2018, but was waived on September 1.

=== Seattle Dragons ===
Williams was selected by the Seattle Dragons in the 7th round of the 2020 XFL draft on October 15, 2019. He missed the first two games of the season with a quadriceps injury. He had his contract terminated when the league suspended operations on April 10, 2020.

== Personal life ==
Williams' father Aaron also played college football at Washington; he was a standout wide receiver for the Huskies from 1979–1982 under head coach Don James. Kasen's sister Kiara played soccer at Arizona State University from 2009–2012.

== See also ==
- Washington Huskies football statistical leaders
