= Hazen High School (Washington) =

High school in Washington, United States

Oliver M. Hazen High School
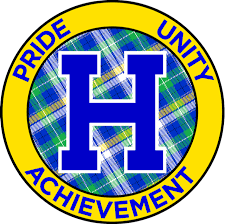
- 1101 Hoquiam Ave NE; Renton, Washington; United States

Information
- Type: High school
- Established: 1967
- School district: Renton School District
- Principal: Craig Cooper
- Teaching staff: 77.50 (FTE)
- Grades: 9-12
- Enrollment: 1,661 (2025-2026)
- Student to teacher ratio: 12.58
- Color
- Song: "Green, Gold and Blue"
- Athletics conference: KingCo 4A
- Mascot: Gordy the Highlander
- Team name: Highlanders
- Rival: Liberty
- Newspaper: The Kilt
- Yearbook: Lonach
- Website: hazen.rentonschools.us

Oliver M. Hazen High School is a public secondary school located in the Renton Highlands of Renton, Washington, United States, in the greater Seattle area. It is a part of the Renton School District.

== History ==
Students first entered the school in the fall of 1968. Oliver M. Hazen, for whom Hazen High School is named, served as the Renton School District Superintendent from 1936-1966. The Hazen Coat of Arms portrays Renton’s coal mining and Boeing Aerospace connections alongside the school’s dedication to excel in pride, unity and achievement.

== Architecture ==
The school was built with a Cold War Institutional exterior with a Brutalist aesthetic. Established in 1967, Hazen High has not seen any major renovations since 2011 when the D-100/200 wings were added.

== Athletics ==
Hazen High School is a member of the KingCo 4A Athletic Conference and Washington Interscholastic Activities Association.

Men's Soccer

The Men's Soccer team won the 3A state title in 2007

Women's Soccer

Hazen's Women's Soccer team won the 4A state title in 1982-83.

2023-2024

- Drill/Dance 3A Military State Champions
- Men's 300 meter hurdles 3A State Champion

2024-2025

- Women's Wrestling 4A State Champion
- Hazen's Vox Lumini Choir placed first in the State Ensemble contest held at Central Washington University
- Men's Soccer 4A State Champion runner up
- Men's 300 meter hurdles 4A State Champion

2025-2026

- Women's 200 meter freestyle 4A State Champion
- Women's Wrestling 4A State Champion
- Men's 300 meter hurdles 4A State Champion

Hazen is home to many athletic programs, including:

- Football
- Golf
- Tennis
- Cross Country
- Competitive Cheer
- Basketball
- Swim
- Wrestling
- Flag Football
- Gymnastics
- Dance/Drill
- Track & Field
- Soccer
- Baseball
- Softball

== Notable alumni ==
- Barbara Madsen (born 1952) — associate justice of the Washington Supreme Court
- Frank Reed (American football) (born 1954) — football player
- Joe Tryon-Shoyinka (born 1999) — football player
