= Redmond High School (Washington) =

Coordinates: 47°41′43″N 122°06′24″W

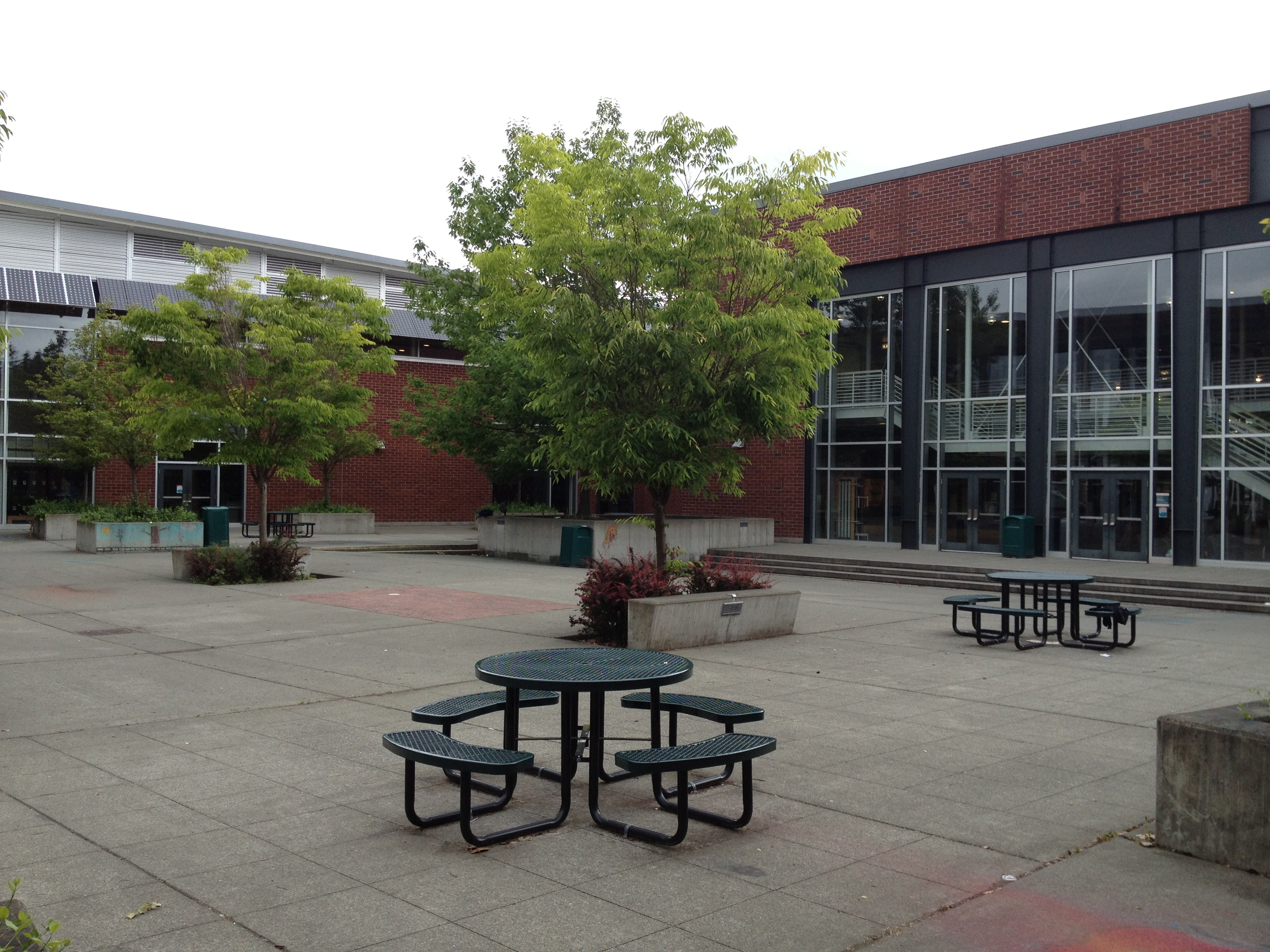
- Central courtyard in 2014

Location
- 17272 Northeast 104th Street; Redmond, Washington 98052; United States

Information
- School type: Public
- Opened: 1964
- School district: Lake Washington School District
- Superintendent: Jon Holmen
- Principal: Jill VanderVeer
- Teaching staff: 107.04 (on an FTE basis)
- Grades: 9–12
- Enrollment: 2,308 (2025–2026)
- Student to teacher ratio: 21.25
- Language: English
- Campus type: Suburban
- Colors: Dark green and gold
- Athletics conference: Kingco 4A
- Mascot: Mustang
- Rivals: Eastlake High School
- Newspaper: The Blaze
- Feeder schools: Redmond Middle School; Evergreen Middle School; Timberline Middle School
- Graduates: 94% (2024–2025)
- Website: rhs.lwsd.org

Redmond High School (RHS) is a four-year public high school located in Redmond, Washington, United States. It is one of four high schools in the Lake Washington School District (LWSD). Opened in 1964, Redmond High School is the second oldest high school in the Lake Washington School District.

Redmond High School sits atop Education Hill in Redmond, in an updated building which opened in 2003 with a two-story structure that features many environmentally friendly energy alternatives including a photovoltaic array and a geothermal heating system. The original building opened in 1964 and underwent extensive remodeling during the 1983–1984 and 2011–2012 school years.

== Academics ==
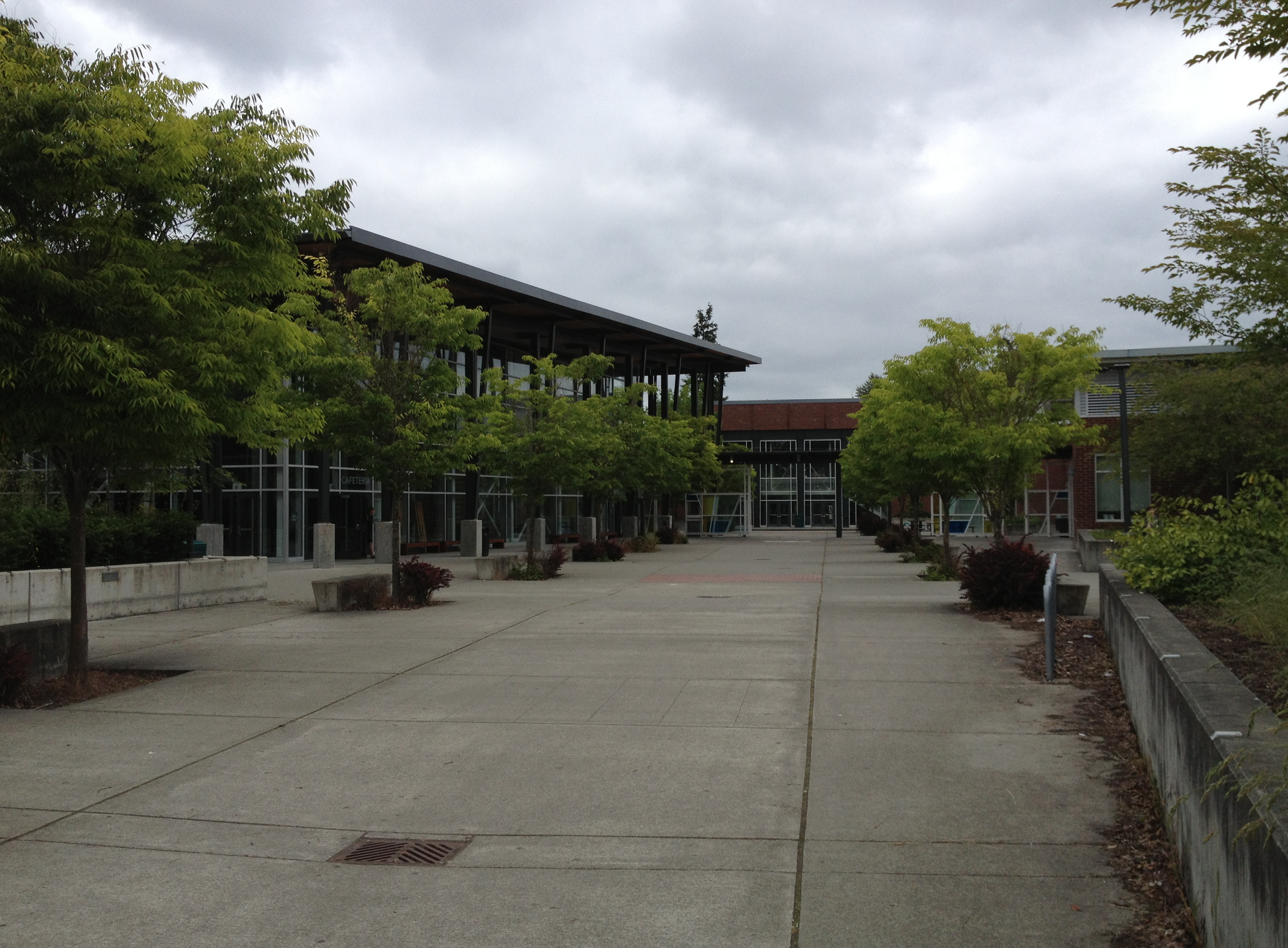
Main walk in front of RHS

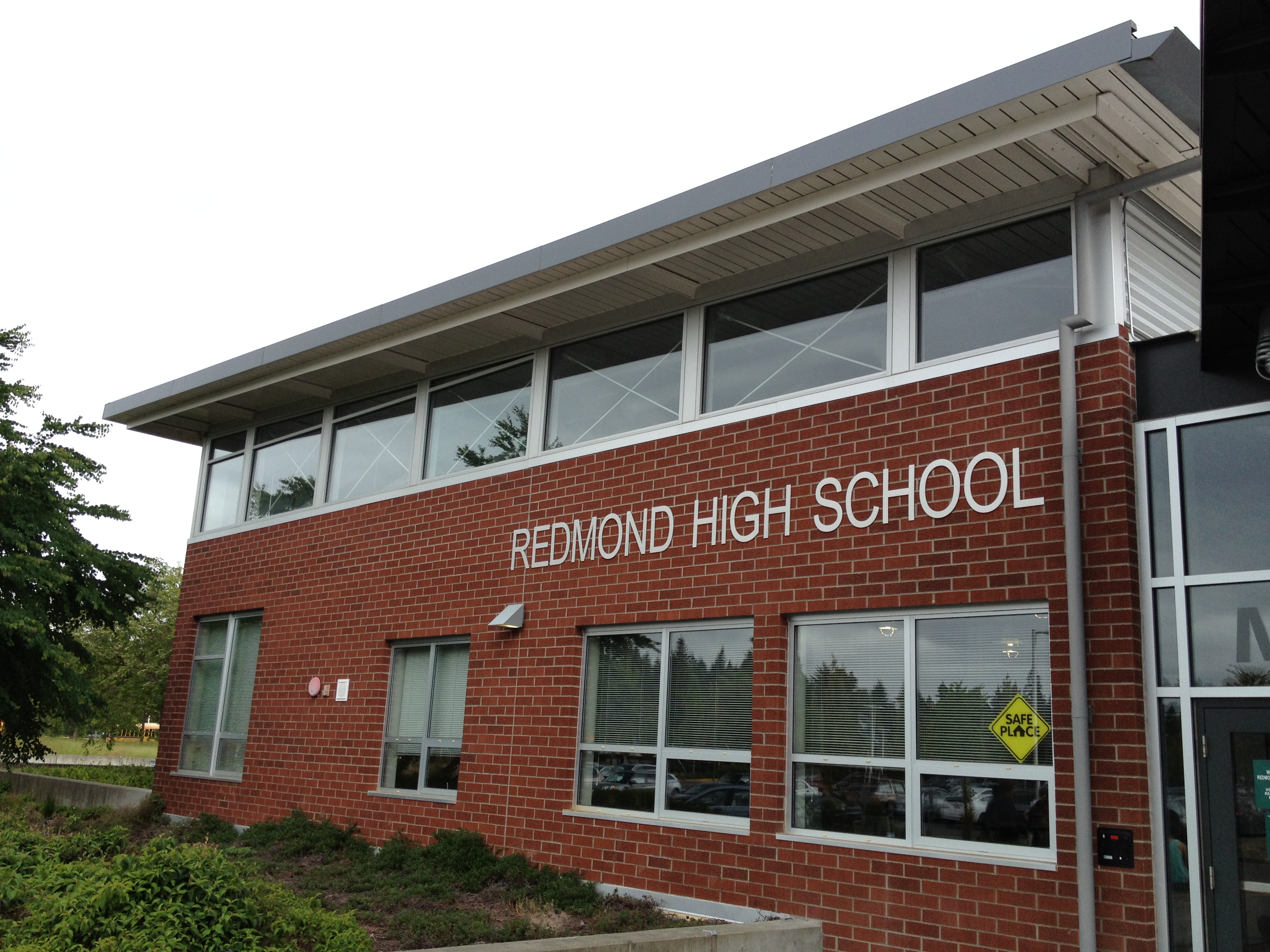
Front of RHS main building

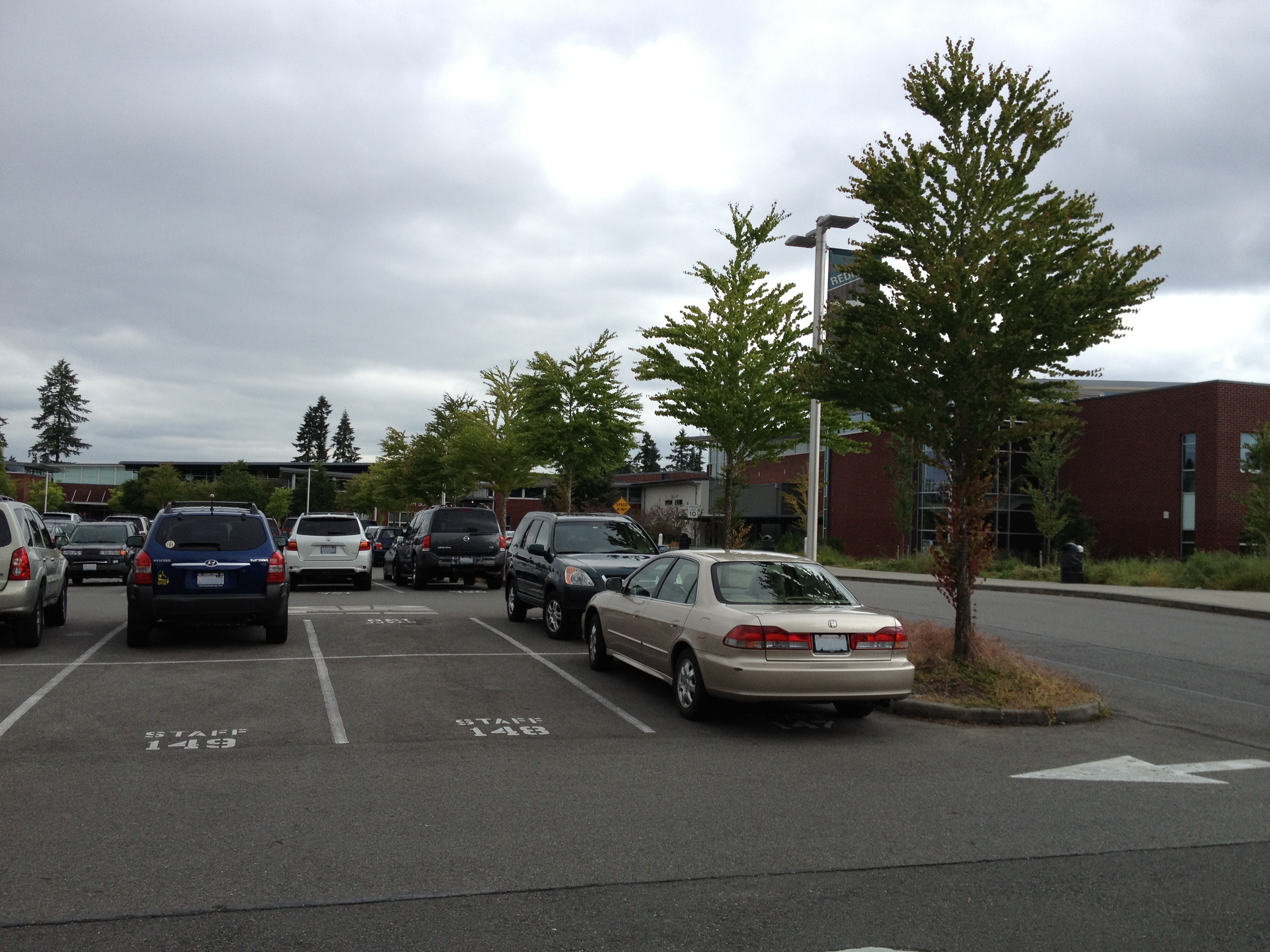
Staff/student front parking lot

Redmond High School offers classes in a diverse range of academic and artistic subjects, including Biology, Chemistry, Physics, Calculus, World History, American History, Physical Education, Photography, Studio Art, and Anatomy & Physiology. Students have the option of taking Regular, Honors, or Advanced Placement (AP) classes in most key subject areas. RHS consistently has strong showings on standardized tests including Measures of Student Progress (MSP) and High School Proficiency Exams (HSPEs). The school consistently has graduation rates over 90%.

In 2013, Redmond High School produced 17 National Merit Semifinalists. The school has also had students become Semifinalists in both the Siemens Competition (2012) and the Intel Science Talent Search (2014).

Paula Ferguson, the orchestra director at RHS, received the Symetra Heroes in the Classroom Award in 2012 for outstanding leadership and instructional skills. Sandy Hargraves, a math teacher, received the Edyth May Sliffe Award for Distinguished High School Mathematics Teaching in 2009. Brian Anderson, an English teacher, received the Golden Apple Award in 2006 for excellence in teaching.

Mike Town, the former AP Environmental Science teacher, and five students were presented with Presidential Environmental Youth Awards by President George W. Bush in 2008 for leading the "Cool Schools Program," which resulted in the reduction of over $550,000 of energy and waste costs for the district, through conservation measures. Town also received the Golden Apple Award in 2008 and the Green Prize in Public Education by the NEA for the program, which has prevented the emission of 1.5 million tons of carbon dioxide, and has since included over 150 schools worldwide.

In June 2019, Redmond High School won several awards in its participation in Microsoft's annual Hunt the Wumpus competition. One team took home the first place trophy for "Most Innovative". Another team won second place for "Best Implementation". These groups worked over a period of several months in preparation for this annual event.

Beginning in the 2025–2026 school year, Redmond High School shifted from a seven-period schedule to a six-period schedule as part of a district-wide budget initiative.

In 2025, Redmond High School had 13 National Merit Finalists. That number increased to 30 in 2026, with five of them receiving the scholarship award.

=== Performing arts ===
The Performing Arts Center (otherwise known as the PAC) showcases performances by the RHS Concert and Jazz Choirs, the Concert and Jazz Bands, Chamber, String, and Symphonic Orchestras, and musicals and plays by Redmond Drama. The drama department participates in the 24/7 Project, which is an improvisation speed-playwright event. Redmond's Music Department attends competitions and festivals throughout the region annually, including the PLU Orchestra Invitational and the "Music in the Parks" festival at Disneyland and Silverwood theme parks. In 2009 and 2013, Redmond High School orchestras performed at Carnegie Hall, and they returned joined with the Jazz Ensemble in 2016. In several years, students in the band program have been selected to march in the Macy's Thanksgiving Day Parade. The PAC is also the performing venue for the Eastside Symphony.

== Organizations ==
Over 44 student organizations exist at Redmond High School, ranging from ethnic groups such as Latinos Unidos and Asian Student Association, to activities such as robotics and bowling.

The school newspaper, The Blaze, was started in the 1960s.

The academic teams at Redmond High School include Knowledge Bowl, Science Olympiad, Math, DECA, Mock Trial, Model UN, Orca Bowl, Programming (or Computer Science), Speech and Debate, and Nuclear Science. RHS Knowledge Bowl teams are known for excellence at the state level and consistently place at state competitions, most recently winning 7th and 8th place at the state tournament. In 2014, the Redmond High School Orca Bowl team also enjoyed great success placing second at the state level. The RHS Model UN debuted at the Washington State Model UN (WASMUN) Conference at Seattle University in 2011. The RHS Feminism club made their debut in 2014, followed by the RHS ACLU club in 2017.

The DECA Class also operates the Student Store, and since 2008, has sent at least 10 participants to the International Career Development Conference per year. The Student Store closed in 2014, and reopened in 2023.

== Athletics ==
Redmond High School's sports department participates in the Washington Interscholastic Activities Association's Kingco Athletic Conference, at the 4A level. Redmond had previously been a member of the Kingco 4A level from 1997 to 2015, was moved to 3A for the 2016-2018 cycle after 22 schools chose to opt up to 4A, and returned to 4A for the 2018-2019 season. Redmond offers 14 varsity sports as well as cheerleading and dance teams.

Sports offered:

- Fall: cross country (coed), football (boys'), tennis (boys'), golf (boys'), slowpitch softball (girls'), soccer (girls'), swimming (girls'), and volleyball (girls')
- Winter: basketball (boys', girls'), wrestling (coed), swimming (boys'), gymnastics (girls'), and flag football (girls')
- Spring: track and field (boys', girls'), soccer (boys'), baseball (boys'), golf (girls'), badminton (girls'), softball (girls'), and tennis (girls')

== School spirit ==
RHS logo

Redmond High School's mascot is the Mustang, and the school colors are predominantly dark green and gold, though in most ceremonies and events black is also included. During events, students participate in the tradition of the "roller coaster," similar to the wave.

Redmond High School Pep Band is organized yearly to play at home football and basketball games. Three students (one for football and two for basketball) are selected as Pep Band Directors, though only the football director is known as Drum Major. The Pep Band was led by Andy Robertson, an inductee of Washington Music Educators Association Hall of Fame and conductor of the Washington Wind Symphony, from 1991 until his death in 2022.

== Campus ==
The Redmond High School campus is centered in one large building containing academic classrooms, a student cafeteria, a central courtyard, three gymnasiums, and a performing arts center. Several portable classrooms are also set up in close proximity to the main building.

In 2012, the B Wing was constructed, adding several additional classrooms. In 2025, construction began on expanding the main office area, including adding a second floor above the main office with additional classrooms. Temporary portables were constructed to house the main office and counseling office. Originally scheduled to finish in Fall 2026, it was delayed to Fall 2027 due to design and permit delays.

For athletics, Redmond High School maintains Walter L. Seabloom field, which accommodates football and track & field events. The campus has two additional open grass fields, baseball and softball fields, and six tennis courts. For aquatic events, Redmond High School utilizes Redmond Pool, across the street from the main campus.

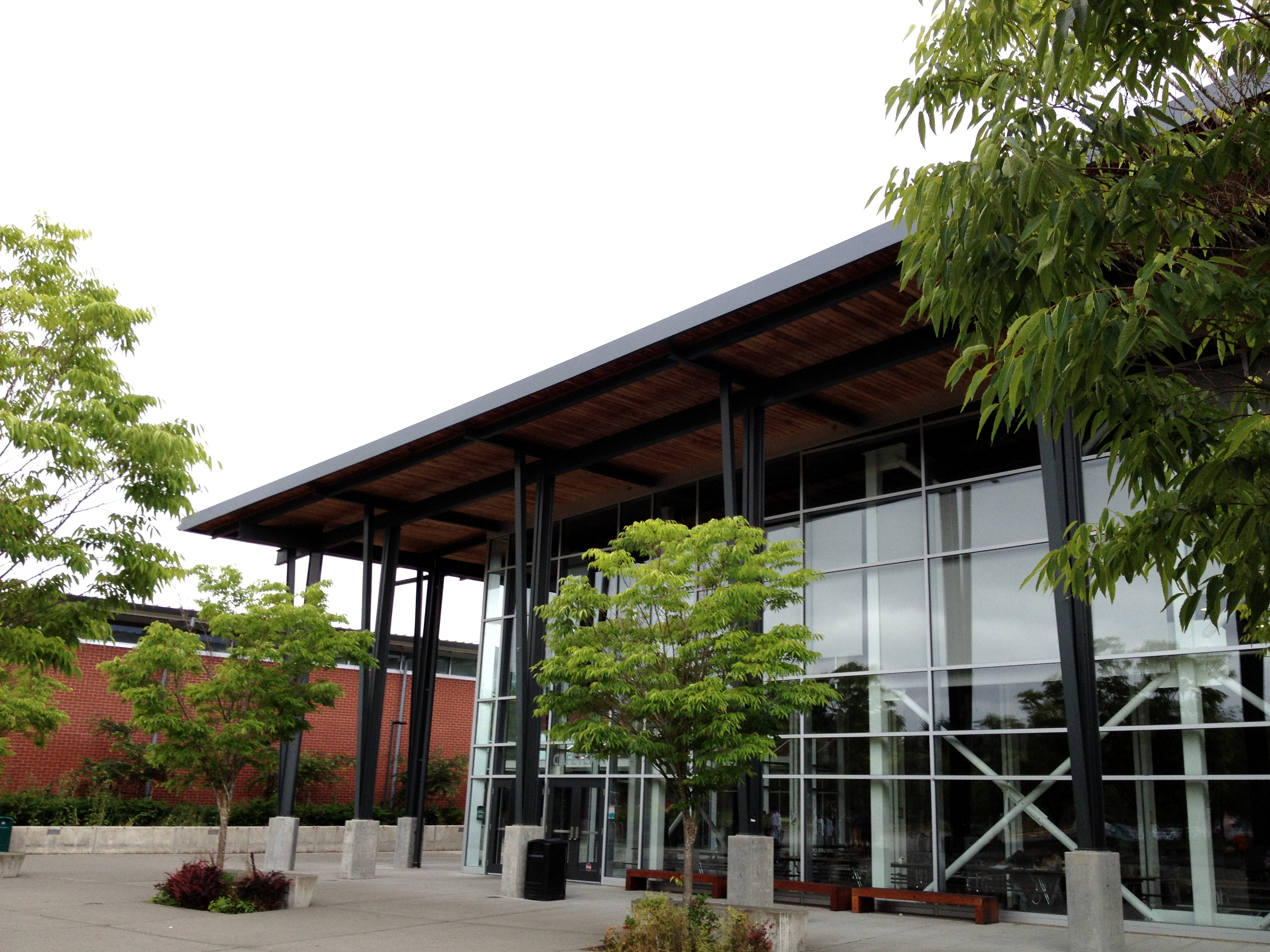
Outside view of student cafeteria

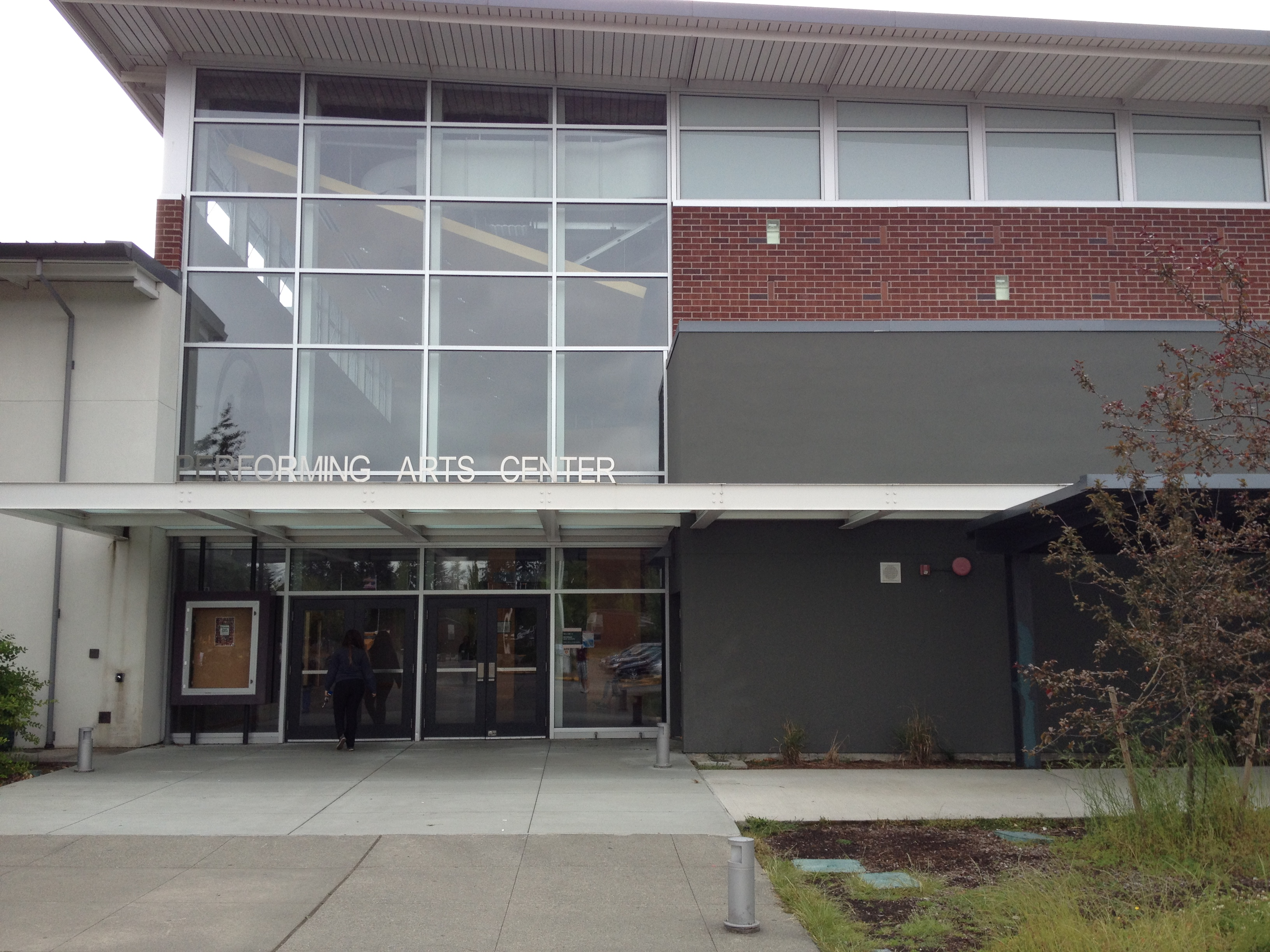
RHS Performing Arts Center

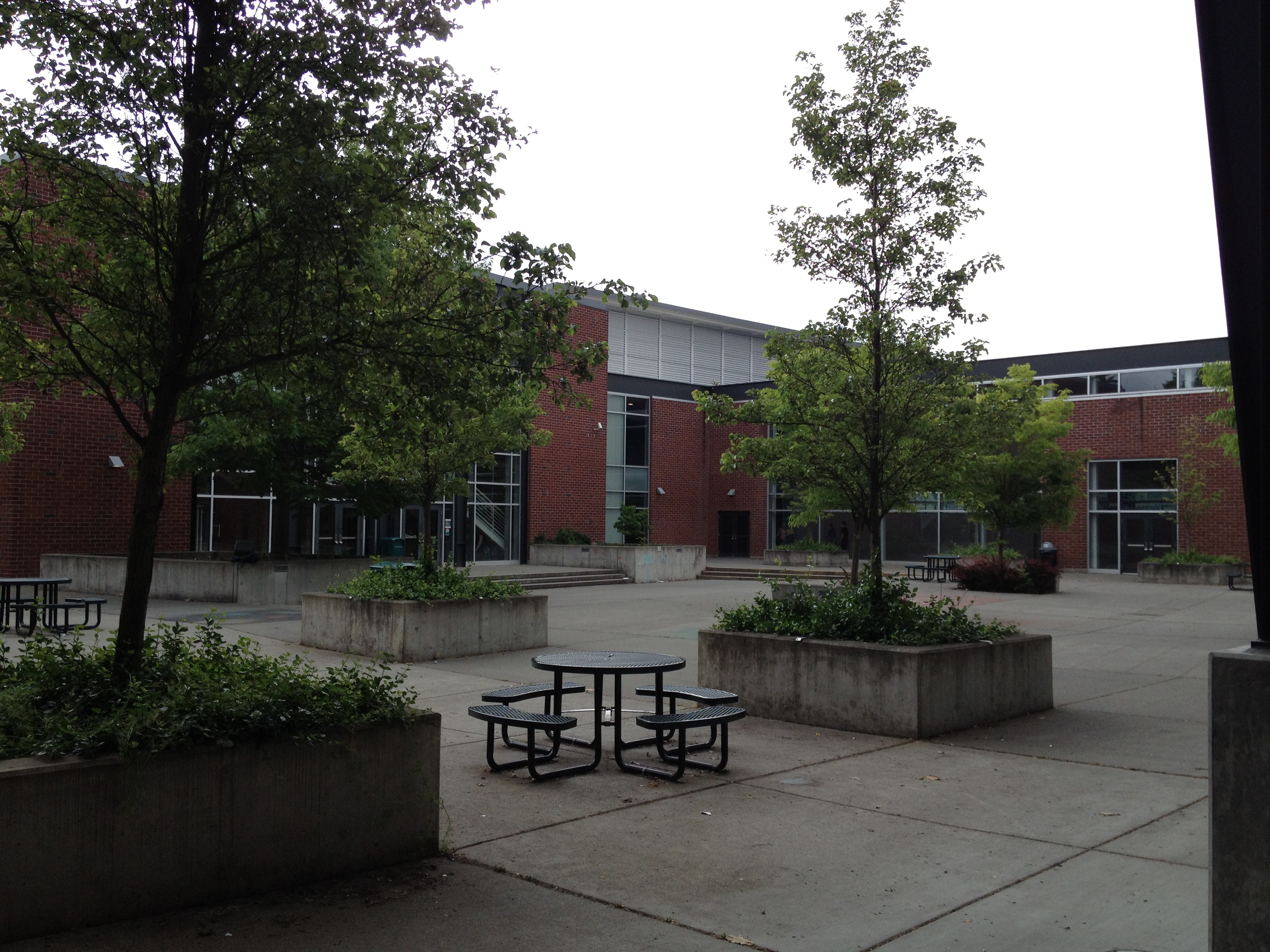
RHS central student courtyard

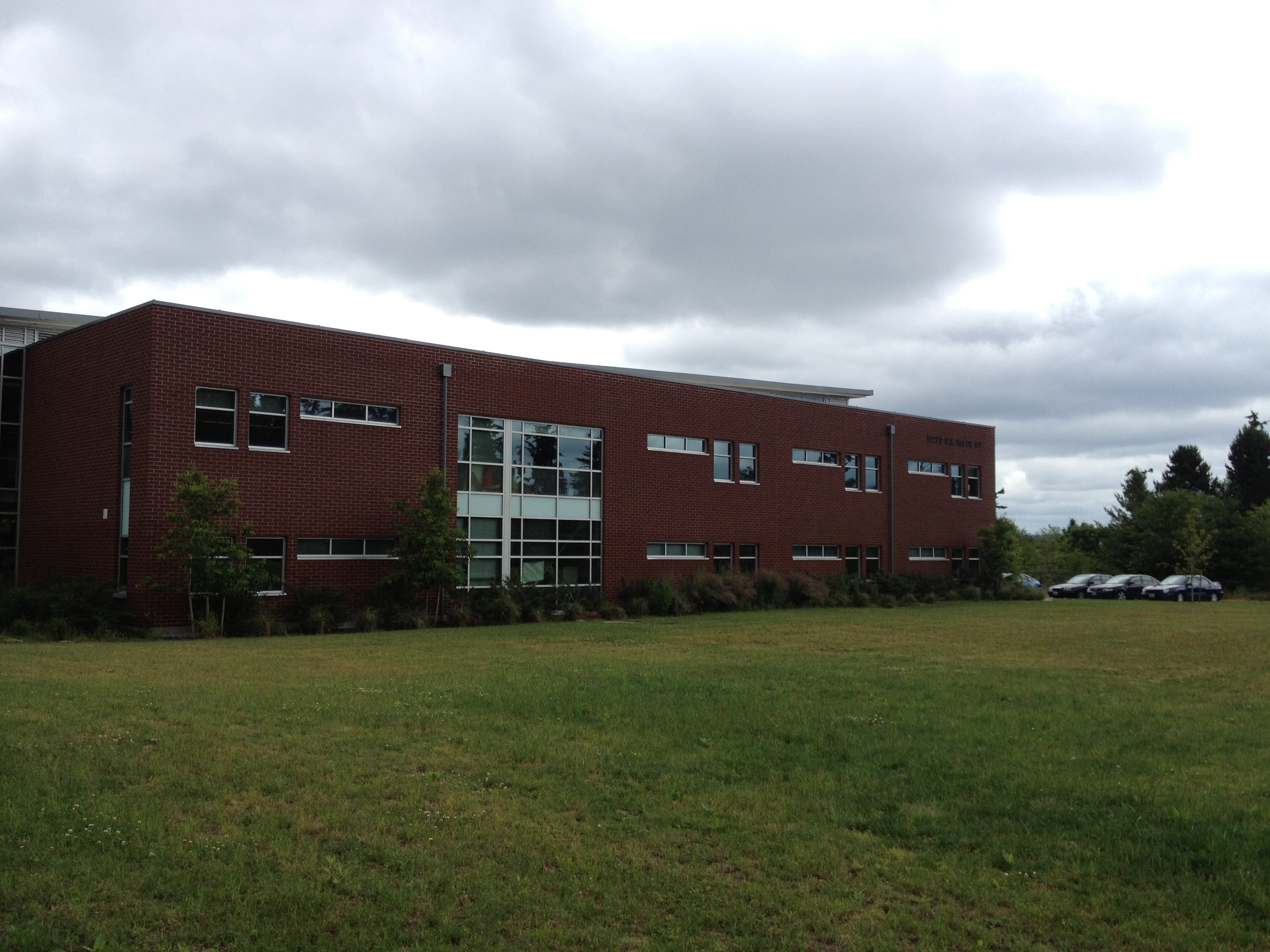
Outside of newly built B Wing

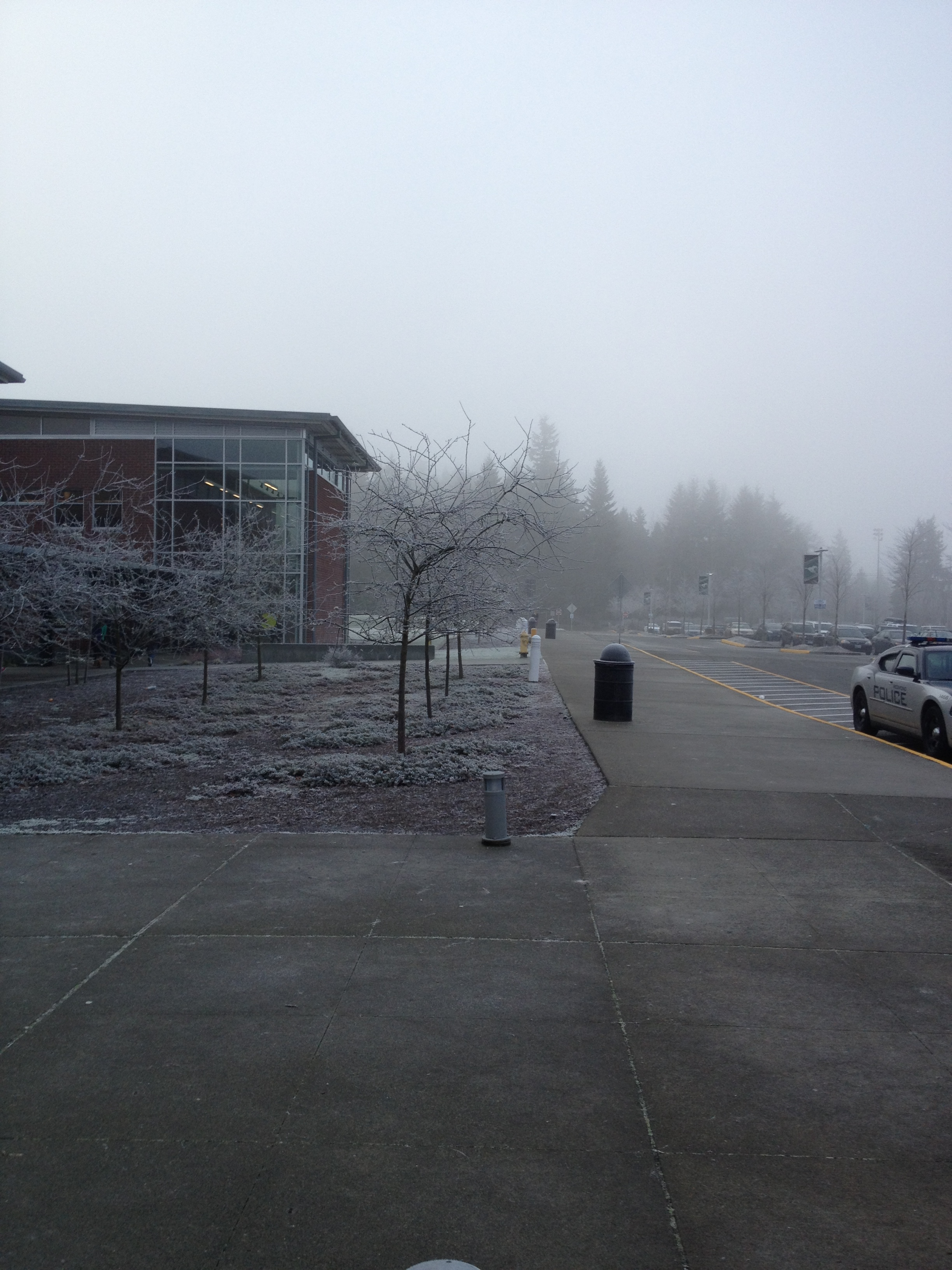
Front of RHS during winter

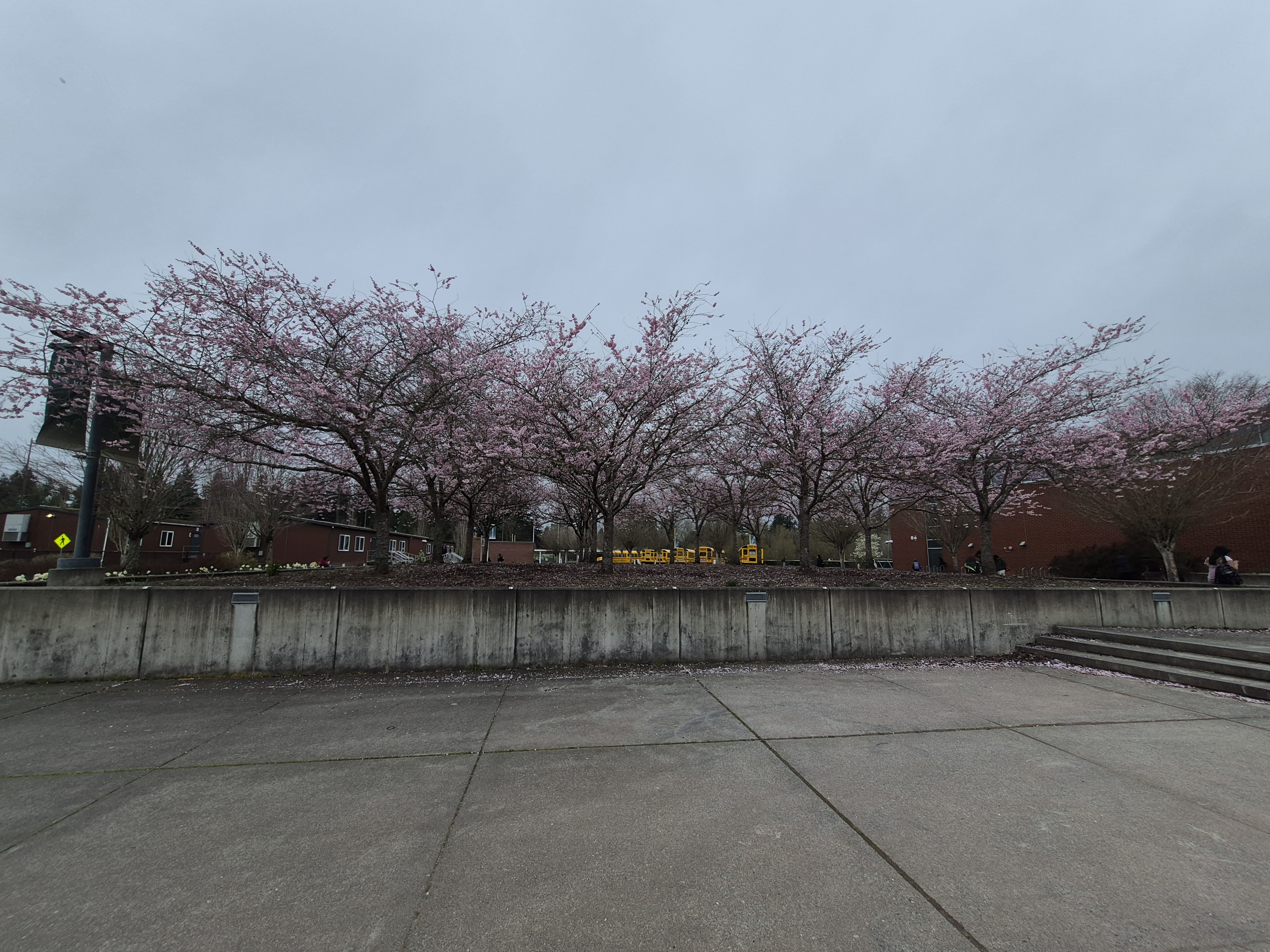
In early Spring, RHS's walkway between the portables and bus lanes.

== Notable alumni ==
- Carson Bruener - college football linebacker for the Washington Huskies, drafted in the 7th round by the Pittsburgh Steelers.
- Michael Conforto - 2013 Pac-12 Baseball Player of the Year, drafted by the New York Mets in the 1st round of the MLB draft
- Jeff D'Amico - former MLB player (Kansas City Royals)
- Brian Falkenborg - former MLB player (Baltimore Orioles, Los Angeles Dodgers, San Diego Padres, St. Louis Cardinals)
- Trevor Guyton - former NFL draft pick (Minnesota Vikings)
- Rick Jacobson - film director
- Jadon Lavik - christian singer-songwriter
- Scott Macartney - Olympic and World Cup alpine ski racer
- Robert Munn - Olympic rower
- Tom Niedenfuer - former MLB pitcher (Los Angeles Dodgers, Baltimore Orioles, Seattle Mariners, St. Louis Cardinals)
- Scott Rockenfield - drummer of Queensrÿche
- Andy Sisco - former MLB player (Kansas City Royals, Chicago White Sox)
- Adora Svitak - child prodigy, activist, and author
- Heather Tarr - former collegiate softball player and softball head coach of the University of Washington
- Nick Thune - comedian
- Cody Votolato - musician, Waxwing, The Blood Brothers, Jaguar Love
