= Skyline High School (Washington) =

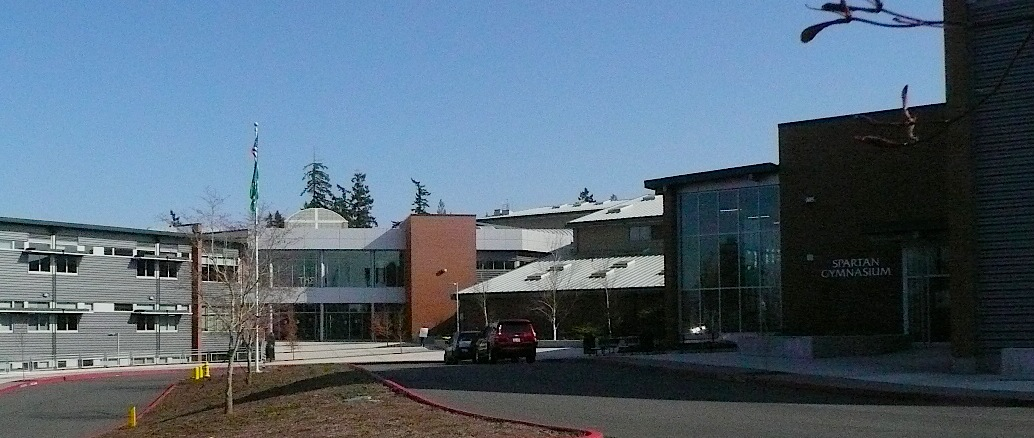
- Main entrance in April 2011

Location
- 1122 228th Ave SE; Sammamish, Washington; United States; 47°36′00″N 122°01′55″W

Information
- Type: Public, four-year
- Established: 1997
- School district: Issaquah S.D. (#411)
- Principal: Keith Hennig
- Faculty: 128
- Teaching staff: 95.38 (FTE)
- Grades: 9-12; 10-12 (2005-2010)
- Enrollment: 2,193 (2023-2024)
- Student to teacher ratio: 22.99
- Campus: Suburban
- Campus size: 50 acres (20 ha)
- Colors: Green & Silver
- Athletics: WIAA Class 4A, SeaKing District Two
- Athletics conference: KingCo 4A
- Mascot: Spartan
- Yearbook: The Horizon
- Feeder schools: Beaver Lake Middle School; Pine Lake Middle School
- Information: 425-837-7700
- Elevation: 550 ft (170 m) AMSL
- Website: skyline.isd411.org

Skyline High School is a four-year public secondary school in Sammamish, Washington, a suburb east of Seattle. The third and newest high school in the Issaquah School District, it opened in the fall of 1997 and serves the district's northern portion. The school colors are green and silver and the mascot is a Spartan.

== Overview ==
The 50-acre (0.20 km^{2}) campus is at the northern boundary of the school district, and straddles the apex of the Sammamish Plateau in the city of Sammamish, at an approximate elevation of 550 feet (170 m) above sea level.

For five academic years (2005–10), Skyline was a three-year senior high school (gr. 10–12). Its students came from the Pacific Cascade Freshman Campus, a 9th-grade-only school which also included the freshman class for Issaquah High School. Prior to 2005, two middle schools directly fed Skyline: Beaver Lake and Pine Lake. Pacific Cascade was reassigned as a middle school (grades 6–8) in the fall of 2010 and the two high schools (Skyline and Issaquah) regained their freshmen classes.

To accommodate the return of the freshman class, Skyline underwent a renovation from 2007 to 2010 that added 24 classrooms and science labs, a black box theater and 3-D art room, and additional athletic facilities.

Skyline is one of three high schools on the Sammamish Plateau, all close in proximity along 228th Avenue. Eastlake High School, in the Lake Washington School District, opened in 1993 and is about a mile (1.6 km) north of Skyline. Between the two public high schools is Eastside Catholic, a private secondary school which relocated to Sammamish in 2008.

== Academics ==
Skyline has the reputation of being a competitive academic school, with an on-time graduation rate of 95.1%. Skyline offers the International Baccalaureate (IB) Diploma and Career-related Program to all juniors and seniors. Skyline offers a range of IB classes, which can be taken alongside standard classes.

Skyline also is part of the Running Start program. Running Start is a program that allows 11th and 12th grade students to take college courses at Washington's 34 community and technical colleges. The added bonus is the cost savings, as students receive both high school and college credit for these classes, thus accelerating their progress through the education system.

== Athletics ==
=== Classification ===
Skyline competes in WIAA Class 4A, with the state's largest schools. SHS competed in 3A for its first seven years, then moved up to 4A for the 2004–05 and 2005–06 academic years. It dropped back to 3A for two years (2006–07 and 2007–08), then returned to 4A for 2008–09. Skyline is one of 9 schools in the KingCo 4A conference, along with Issaquah, Newport, Eastlake, Redmond, Bothell, Inglemoor, Mt. Si, North Creek, and Woodinville. KingCo 4A is the only 4A conference in the state's SeaKing District Two, which includes Seattle and east King County.

=== State titles ===
Skyline's football program has seven state titles ((3A) 2000, (4A) 2005, (3A) 2007; (4A) 2008, 2009, 2011, 2012), and many alumni have played Division I college football. Skyline’s Women’s Cross Country team won the state championship in 2001. Skyline's dance team won a state title in the Dance category in 2019 and 1st overall in the pom category the following year. The girls' soccer team has seven 4A state titles (2008, 2009, 2011, 2012, 2018, 2022, 2023), while the boys' soccer team has one 4A state title (2023). In 2022-2023, Skyline became the first school to win both the boys' and girls' 4A soccer state titles in the same school year. The cheer program has gone on to win 21 State Championships, a UCA National Championship (2017), and a Cheer World Championship silver medal (2013). The girls' swim and dive team won three consecutive 4A state titles (2009, 2010, 2011), beating the competition by over 50 points each time, as well as titles in 2015 and 2016.The boys swim and dive team won their first 4A state title in 2018. In track and field, the girls' team won the 3A state title in 2007. In Ultimate Frisbee, the Spartans went 7-1 during the regular season and won the 2013 Spring B-Division championship. The team later went on to win the Spring Reign B-Division Championship, one of the largest youth Ultimate tournaments in the country.

== Notable alumni ==
- Max Browne - Former collegiate quarterback and sports analyst
- David Cheng - Chinese-American sports car racing driver
- Riley Griffiths - Actor and collegiate defensive lineman
- Jake Heaps - Former NFL quarterback, current coach of Russell Wilson
- Adrian Sampson - Professional baseball and former MLB player
- Matisse Thybulle - NBA player (attended for two years, before transferring to Eastside Catholic School)
- Kasen Williams - Former XFL and NFL wide receiver

== Controversies ==
=== Shooting threats ===
In September 2012, the high school received threats about someone threatening up to shoot their school online.

The message included about how the person who sent the threat wanted to do the shooting at the school's common area with their father's submachine gun. The message talked about targeting specific groups like athletes and students who were rich. The message included details about what gun the poster would use and said they would only stop when the police killed them or when they ran out of bullets.

This threat alerted the Seattle Police Department, so the police went to check the school to make sure everyone in the school was safe.

In response to this, Skyline High School closed down the school on Thursday, September 20. This alerted many students and police officers because they were concerned about gun violence, especially after another threat was made by the suspect a few months before at Meadowdale High School.

Eastside Catholic High School, less than a mile from Skyline, closed the next day due to safety precautions.

It turns out, the shooting didn't happen at the day of when the shooting was going to be set said in the online post.

The authorities arrested the suspect a few weeks later in their home in Edmonds. The suspect was an unidentified 16-year-old former student, according to a King County Sheriff's Office spokesperson. Detectives took away three computers and two cellphones. No weapons were found in the suspect's home.

=== 2014 rape and subsequent victim harassment campaign ===
In 2014, two members of the Skyline football team raped a 16-year-old girl. According to the lawsuit filed in October 2018 by the victim and her younger sister, the Issaquah School District refused to investigate the two players. The two individuals pleaded guilty in a juvenile court, and were forced to transfer out of Skyline.

Many Skyline students responded by starting a targeted harassment campaign of the victim to force her to transfer so the football players could come back. This included cyber-bullying, personal confrontations, firebombing the victims house, and planting drugs on her. In one instance, former Skyline football coach Brad Burmester responded "Preach on Brother" to a tweet saying that the victim should be the one to transfer.

After the victim's graduation the harassment was targeted towards her younger sister who continued to attend the school. In 2018, the sisters filed a lawsuit for bullying and retaliation against the Issaquah School District as well as Superintendent Ron Theile, Skyline High School Principal Donna Hood, and school officer Chris Burton. However, the school district denied all allegations.
