= Issaquah High School =

Public four-year educational institution in Washington (High school), United States

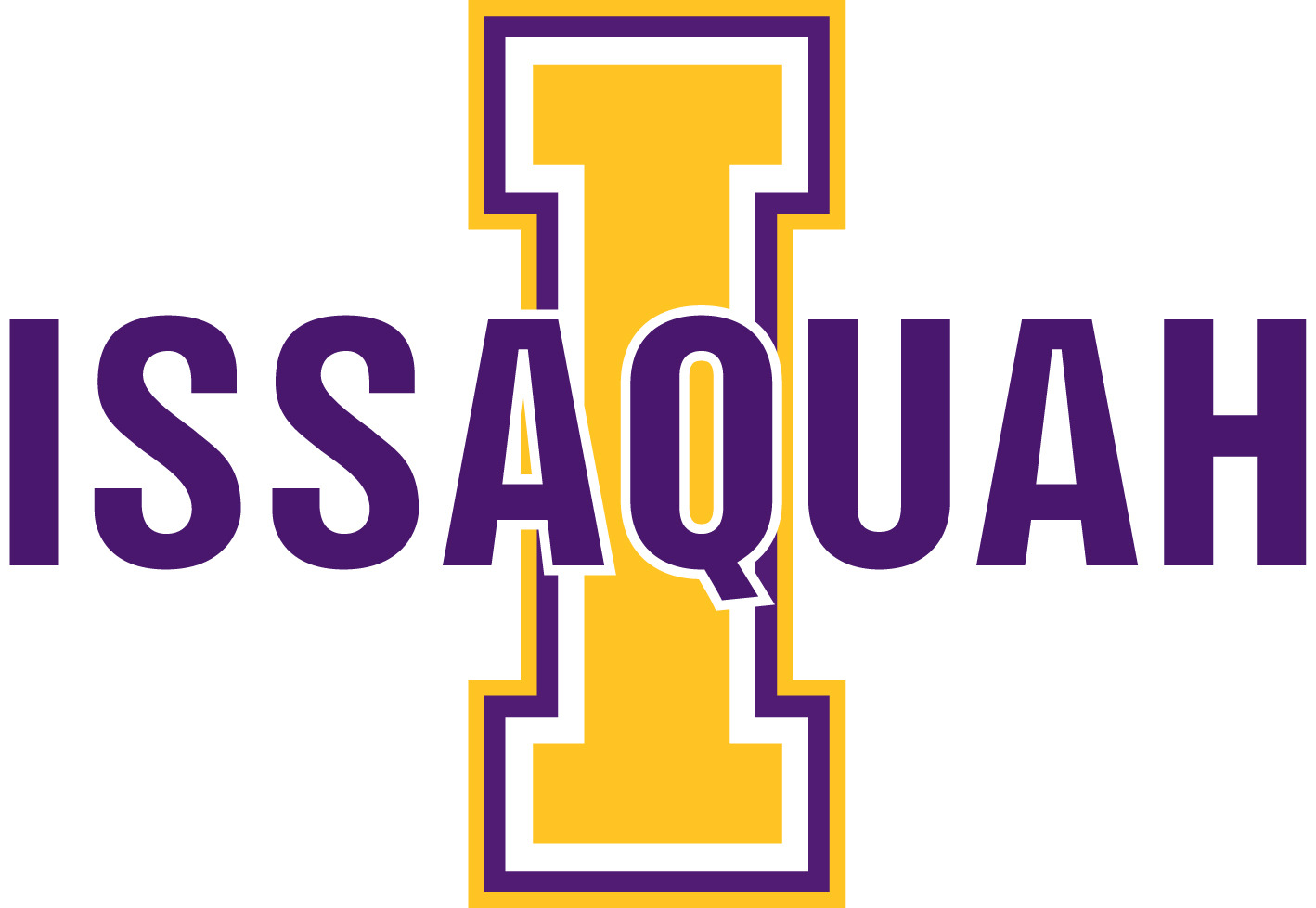

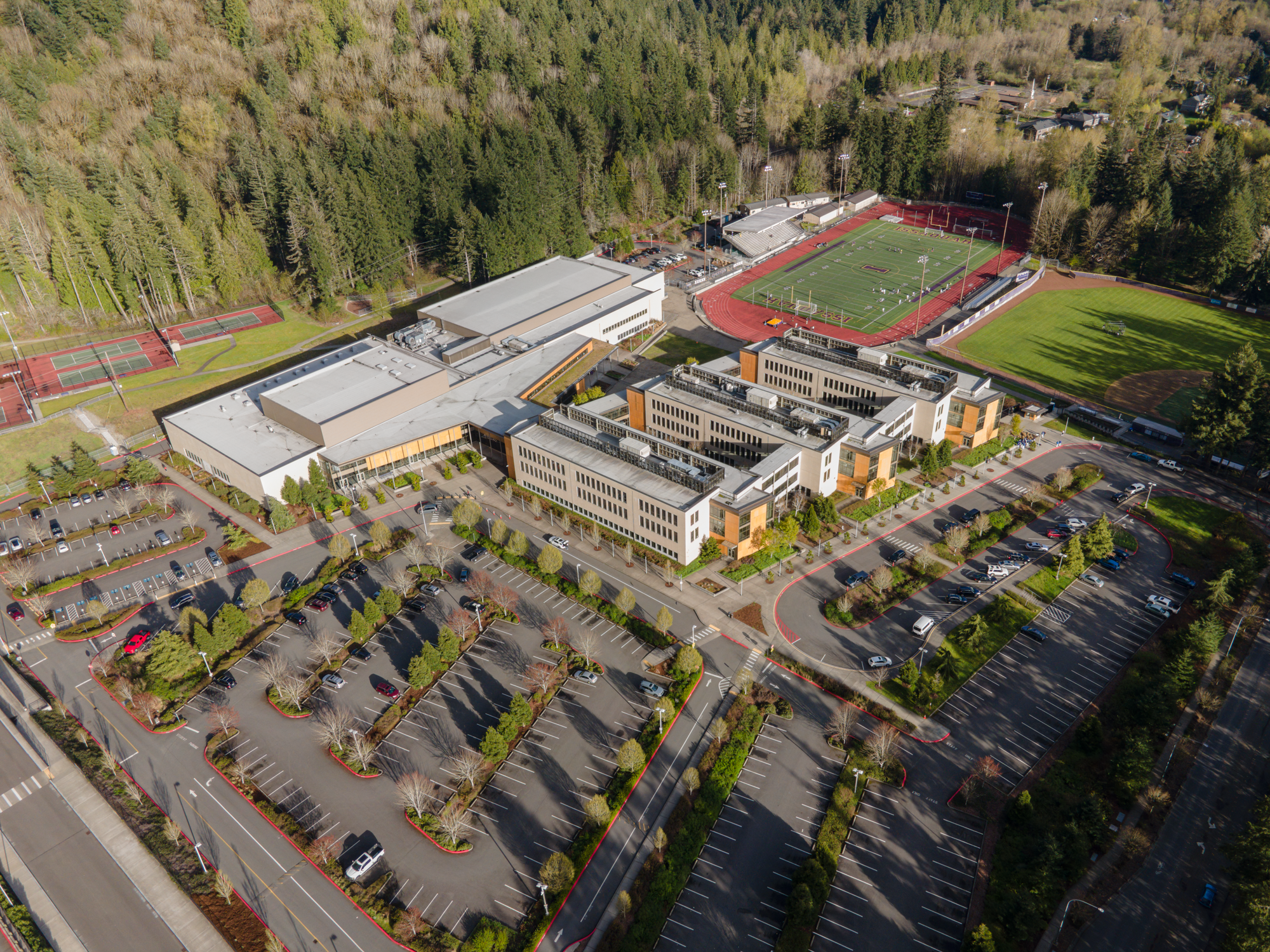
- Aerial view of Issaquah High School

Location
- 700 2nd Ave SE; Issaquah, Washington 98027; United States; 47°31′20″N 122°01′44″W

Information
- Type: Public, four-year
- Established: 1901
- School district: Issaquah School District
- Principal: Erin Connolly
- Teaching staff: 110.22 (on an FTE basis)
- Grades: 9-12; 10-12 (2005-2010)
- Enrollment: 2,419 (2024-2025)
- Student to teacher ratio: 21.95
- Campus: Suburban
- Colors: Purple and gold
- Athletics: WIAA Class 4A, SeaKing District Two
- Athletics conference: KingCo 4A, Crest Division
- Nickname: Eagles
- Yearbook: The Sammamish
- Website: issaquahhigh.isd411.org

Issaquah High School (also known as IHS or Issaquah) is a four-year public secondary school in Issaquah, Washington, United States, a suburb east of Seattle. It is one of three high schools in the Issaquah School District and serves students in grades 9–12 from the central portion of the district. Issaquah High serves the cities of Issaquah, Sammamish, and Bellevue.

== History ==
Founded in 1901, IHS was the only high school in the school district until Liberty High School opened in 1977. Previously located near the Issaquah Middle School campus, IHS moved to its present site in southeast Issaquah in 1962.

Growth of enrollment at IHS has coincided with the growth of the Issaquah community. The Issaquah School District completed the construction of the Pacific Cascade Freshman Campus in 2005, making it the new home to the freshman class of IHS and nearby Skyline High School. IHS enrolled only three school grades (10–12) for five academic years (2005–10) while an extensive remodeling of the school took place. The cost of the remodel totaled $61,500,000. IHS is now the district's largest school. The three stories accommodate 2,400 students. There are three classroom wings, science labs, a main and auxiliary gym, commons, and administrative spaces.

=== Mascot change ===
In 2003, the school changed its team name from "Indians" to "Eagles". The change came after The Church Council of Greater Seattle adopted a resolution calling for an end to all Native American imagery in school mascots in 2002.

=== Controversies ===
In 2013 a bracket entitled "May Madness" was posted anonymously to Facebook. It included photos of 64 girls and invited others to vote for which girl they believed to be the hottest.

In March 2019, a female student held a poster with a reference to black slavery in order to ask out a male classmate to Tolo, an annual school dance, which many deemed offensive. As a response to the resulting media coverage surrounding the incident, IHS students staged a walkout in which they denounced hate and racism.

In October 2023 AI-generated pornographic material of a number of female students and a staff member were circulated.

== Academics ==
Issaquah High offers the Advanced Placement program, with more than 16 college-level courses. In 2013, IHS had 11 National Merit Finalists and 24 National Merit Commended Scholars. More than 90% of IHS students earned a 3 or better in AP exams.

The Advanced Sports Med Class placed 1st at National Competition and were the WCTSMA Team State Champions.

== Staff ==
In 2013–14 IHS staff includes 103 certified and 44 classified staff. Over half of the certificated staff have master's degrees.

== Notable alumni ==
- Isaac Brock - lead singer of Modest Mouse
- Colin Curtis - MLB outfielder for the New York Yankees (class of 2003)
- Kate Deines - Women's Professional Soccer player for the Seattle Sounders Women
- Alec Diaz - professional soccer player for the Tacoma Defiance (class of 2020)
- Zach Hall - member of the Washington House of Representatives (class of 2013)
- Don Hover - NFL linebacker for the Washington Redskins (class of 1973)
- Keana Hunter - synchronized swimmer
- Jennie Reed - world and U.S. national champion track cyclist and Olympian
- Turner Wiley - marathon runner
- Brian Yorkey - Broadway writer and lyricist
- Kamden Na - member of the kpop group Ampers&One
