= Issaquah School District =

School district in Washington state

Address
- 5150 220th Ave SE Issaquah, King County, Washington, 98029; United States
- Coordinates: 47°33′16″N 122°02′49″W

District information
- Grades: Pre-K through 12
- Superintendent: Heather Tow-Yick
- Schools: 29
- NCES District ID: 5303750

Students and staff
- Students: 19,258 (2024-2025)
- Teachers: 1,228 (2024-2025)
- Student–teacher ratio: 15.9 (2023-2024)

Other information
- Website: isd411.org

Issaquah School District No. 411 is a public school district in King County, Washington. It is headquartered in Issaquah, Washington.

As of the 2024-2025 school year, the district has an enrollment of 19,258 students with 29 total schools.

== Attendance boundary ==
The district's attendance boundary includes Issaquah as well as portions of Bellevue, East Renton Highlands, Hobart, Mirrormont, Newcastle, Renton, and Sammamish.

== Schools ==
=== High schools (9-12th grades) ===
- Issaquah High School, is located south of downtown Issaquah, and is expectedly the district's oldest high school. IHS opened in 1905 and moved to its present location in 1962. School colors: purple and gold. Mascot: Eagles.
- Liberty Senior High School, opened in 1977 at the southwest region of the district. LHS was named the National Blue Ribbon school in 1999 and was recognized in Washington, D.C. School colors: Silver, Green, & Blue. Mascot: Patriots.
- Skyline High School is the district's newest high school, opening its doors in 1997. Located in Sammamish on the northern boundary of the district, Skyline serves as a community center for the city of Sammamish. School colors: Green & Silver. Mascot: Spartans.
- Gibson Ek High School, opened in the fall of 2016 at the previous location of Issaquah Middle School. Gibson Ek is a choice high school that places emphasis on real world experience. Students are allowed to explore career options with the help of volunteer mentors and are required to go to internships on Tuesdays and Thursdays. Mascot: Griffins.

=== Middle schools (6-8th grades) ===
- Beaver Lake Middle School – feeder school for Skyline Mascot: Bulldogs
- Cougar Mountain Middle School; district's newest middle school, opened in 2022 - feeder school for Issaquah & Liberty. Mascot: Falcon
- Issaquah Middle School – feeder school for Issaquah High. Mascot: Panthers
- Maywood Middle School – feeder school for Liberty. Mascot: Chargers
- Pine Lake Middle School – feeder school for Skyline. Mascot: Wolverines
- Pacific Cascade Middle School - formerly Pacific Cascade Freshman Campus, feeder school for Issaquah High School. Mascot: Lynx

=== Elementary schools (K-5th grades) ===
- Apollo Elementary School – feeder school for Maywood and Liberty. It is also a host site for the district's Mind Education – Right and Left (brain) Integration (MERLIN) program.
- Briarwood Elementary School – feeder school for Maywood and Liberty
- Cascade Ridge Elementary School – feeder school for Beaver Lake and Skyline
- Cedar Trails Elementary School - feeder for Pacific Cascade Middle and Issaquah High School
- Challenger Elementary School – feeder school for Beaver Lake and Skyline
- Clark Elementary School – feeder school for Issaquah Middle and Issaquah High School
- Cougar Ridge Elementary School – feeder school for Cougar Mountain Middle School, and Liberty & Issaquah High School
- Creekside Elementary School - feeder school for Pine Lake and Skyline
- Discovery Elementary School – feeder school for Pine Lake, Beaver Lake, and Skyline
- Endeavour Elementary School – feeder school for Beaver Lake and Skyline. It is also a host site for the district's Mind Education – Right and Left (brain) Integration (MERLIN) program.
- Grand Ridge Elementary School – feeder school for Pacific Cascade Middle and Issaquah High School
- Issaquah Valley Elementary School – feeder school for Issaquah Middle and Issaquah High School
- Maple Hills Elementary School – feeder school for Maywood and Liberty
- Newcastle Elementary School – feeder school for Cougar Mountain Middle School and Liberty
- Sunny Hills Elementary School – feeder school for Pine Lake Middle, Pacific Cascade Middle, Skyline High and Issaquah High School
- Sunset Elementary School – feeder school for Pacific Cascade Middle and Issaquah High School

=== Closed schools ===
- Tiger Mountain Community High School was a high school serving students throughout the district who seek an alternative to the traditional high school environment. Each student was given personalized lessons and support by the staff which adds to the alternative style of education. Tiger Mountain was also the site for a regional high tech learning center serving students throughout the region. This school closed after the 2015–2016 school year.

== In the news ==
=== 2002 District strike ===
The Issaquah School District teachers' union voted to strike which in turn left Issaquah schools to be closed from the opening day of school, September 4, until September 26 – closing the school for a total of three weeks; fifteen total school days. An agreement was made on September 25 ratified by a 740-45 majority vote cast by the teachers at Issaquah High School, relieving the teachers of the threats of fines that would be put in place because the teachers voted to defy a King County Superior Court injunction calling for the teachers to return to work. Resulting from the strike was a 3.8 percent pay increase over two years; ninety-five percent being covered by state aid. An additional $250 "return to work incentive" was offered to all teachers as well as a $500 bonus the following year. Because of the increased incentive to return to work, more staff was gained in that year than during any previous year.

=== 2006 Bus driver termination ===
An Issaquah School District bus driver now identified as Staci LaManna was fired in September 2006 when she allegedly "flipped off" former United States President George W. Bush in June 2006 while she was transporting a group of students back from a field trip to the Woodland Park Zoo. The 43-year-old driver has filed a union grievance for wrongful termination. The Issaquah School District stated that the termination was a result of a "pattern of behavior" and not for any political reasons.

=== 2014 Rape and subsequent victim harassment campaign ===
In 2014 a 16-year-old girl was raped by two members of the Skyline football team. She reported it, they were convicted and a protective order forced the rapists off the team and out of the school. The community and coaches responded by starting a targeted harassment campaign of the victim and her younger sister that included online bullying, personal confrontations, firebombing the victims house, planting drugs on her, and prominently featuring the rapists during her graduation ceremony attempting to force her to move to another school so the rapists could come back and play for Skyline. After her graduation the harassment continued against her younger sister.

=== 2015 district walkout ===
All schools in the Issaquah School District were closed on May 19, 2015, when the Issaquah School District Teachers' Union voted to go on strike to earn more funding from the state for Washington's schools. Thousands of teachers of the Issaquah School District, Mercer Island School District, and Seattle School District filled the streets of Downtown Seattle and traveled from the Seattle Center to Westlake Park. The commotion caused by this walkout caused some senators in Olympia to propose a bill to decrease teachers' pay while on strike, but this proposal was not accepted by many senators.

=== 2021 sexual abuse settlement ===
In 2021 Issaquah School District settled with a former student for 4.25 million dollars, the biggest sexual abuse settlement in state history.

== Demographics ==
Enrollment by Ethnicity
Ethnicity	2020-21	2021-22	2022-23	2023-24	2024-25
White	9,538 (46.9%)	8,620 (43.7%)	8,276 (42.0%)	7,963 (40.7%)	7,570 (39.3%)
Asian	6,697 (32.9%)	6,704 (34.0%)	6,842 (34.8%)	6,986 (35.7%)	7,042 (36.6%)
Hispanic/Latino	1,861 (9.2%)	2,003 (10.1%)	2,061 (10.5%)	2,115 (10.8%)	2,114 (11.0%)
Two or More Races	1,731 (8.5%)	1,868 (9.5%)	1,924 (9.8%)	1,940 (9.9%)	1,926 (10.0%)
Black/African American	423 (2.1%)	456 (2.3%)	493 (2.5%)	512 (2.6%)	537 (2.8%)
American Indian/Alaskan Native	37 (0.2%)	38 (0.2%)	52 (0.3%)	40 (0.2%)	39 (0.2%)
Total Enrollment	20,325	19,737	19,685	19,585	19,258

Enrollment by Gender
Gender	2020-21	2021-22	2022-23	2023-24	2024-25
Male	10,358 (51.0%)	10,178 (51.6%)	10,225 (51.9%)	10,155 (51.9%)	10,002 (51.9%)
Female	9,967 (49.0%)	9,559 (48.4%)	9,459 (48.1%)	9,428 (48.1%)	9,254 (48.1%)
Gender X	0 (0.0%)	0 (0.0%)	1 (0.0%)	2 (0.0%)	2 (0.0%)
Total Enrollment	20,325	19,737	19,685	19,585	19,258

As of October 31st, 2024, 12.8% of students are on free or reduced-price meal programs.*

== Staff ==
In the district, as of the 2023-24 school year, there are 1,228 classroom teachers. Of these, 936 (76.2%) have at least a master's degree. Teachers have an average of 12.8 years of experience in the district.

== Footnotes ==
*Data can be found under "Area Eligibility Data/Eligibility for Free and Reduced-Price Meals". You can download the "2024-25 Report" Excel file (.xlsx) to view the data for all school districts. Scroll down to the 891st row to view data specific for Issaquah School District, and under the X column, you can find the percentage stated.
