= Mercer Island School District =

School district in Washington, United States

Coordinates: 47°34′18″N 122°13′24″W

Location
- 4160 86th Ave SE Mercer Island, Washington 98040

District information
- Type: Public
- Grades: Pre-K through 12
- Superintendent: Dr. Fred Rundle

Students and staff
- Students: 4,009
- Teachers: 270

Other information
- Website: https://www.mercerislandschools.org/

The Mercer Island School District is a public U.S. school district in Washington. It serves Mercer Island, an affluent bedroom community of Seattle, and has a strong academic reputation. The six schools on Mercer Island provide approximately 4,000 students with primary and secondary education.

Mercer Island High School won the Washington Interscholastic Activities Association (WIAA) Scholastic Cup Championship for the 3A classification from 2007 to 2016.

== Schools ==
The school district is made up of four elementary schools, one middle school, and one high school (with an alternative branch).

- Elementary Schools
  - Lakeridge Elementary
  - Island Park Elementary
  - Northwood Elementary
  - West Mercer Elementary
- Middle School
  - Islander Middle School
- High School
  - Mercer Island High School

== Legal issues ==
In 2016, Gary "Chris" Twombley, a Mercer Island High School teacher was accused of having an inappropriate relationship with a sophomore student. Another person came forward in 2023 with allegations, and this pressure revealed that the school district had kept the issue quiet. Twombley relinquished his Washington State teaching license while resigning from the school district.
