= Tahoma High School =

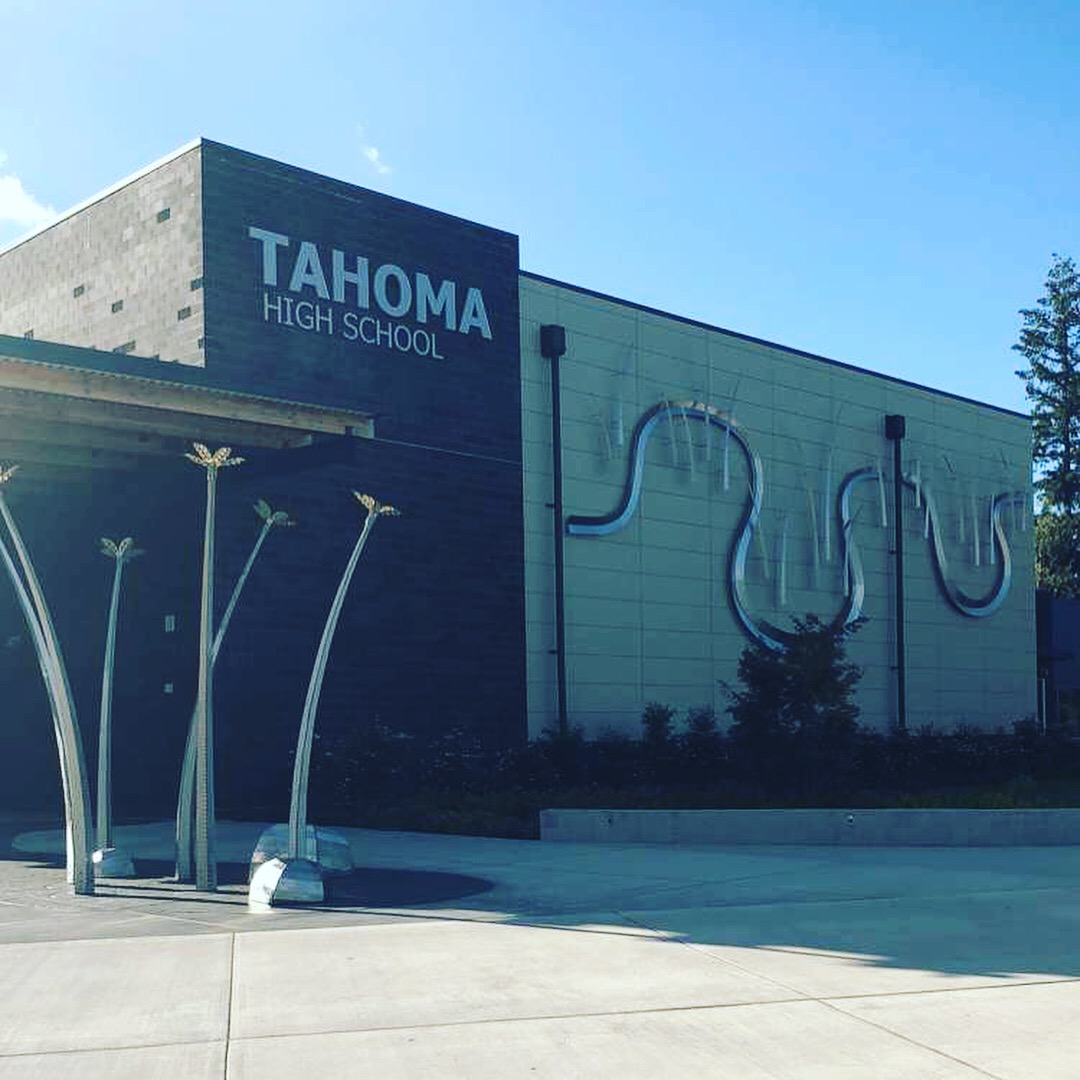

Location
- 23499 Southeast Tahoma Way; Maple Valley, King County, Washington 98038; United States; 47°21′28.531″N 122°01′20.255″W

Information
- Type: public high school
- Motto: Future Ready
- Established: 1927
- School district: Tahoma School District No. 409
- Principal: Judy Beliveau
- Staff: 124.02 (FTE)
- Faculty: 126
- Grades: 9 to 12
- Age range: 14 to 21
- Enrollment: 2,890 (2023–24)
- Student to teacher ratio: 23.10
- Language: 82% English
- Campus: Large Suburb
- Colors: Royal Blue and Gold
- Mascot: Tahoma Bears
- Nickname: Bears
- Accreditation: accredited through the state of Washington
- Publication: Bear Bytes
- Newspaper: Tahoma News
- Affiliation: Tahoma School District
- Website: tahomahighschool.tahomasd.us

Tahoma High School (THS), formerly Tahoma Senior High School (TSHS), is a public high school serving grades nine through twelve and is the only high school in the Tahoma School District. The school provides for citizens in southeast King County, and has been housed in multiple buildings, the current one being a three-story structure in Maple Valley built in 2017.

== Overview ==
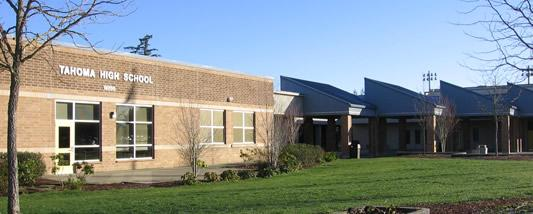
The former Tahoma Senior High School building, since converted to Maple View Middle School.

Tahoma High School is a suburban campus located near the intersection of two major state routes, Maple Valley Highway (SR 169) and Kent-Kangley Road (SR 516). It is close to Maple Valley Town Square, colloquially known as Four Corners, a major retail area of Maple Valley located at the intersection.

Tahoma High School serves the entirety of Maple Valley and Hobart, portions of Renton, Covington, Ravensdale, and Black Diamond, and a significant area of unincorporated King County. The school is bordered by Enumclaw Senior High School to the south, Mt. Si High School to the east, Liberty High School to the north, Hazen High School to the northwest, and Kentlake High School to the west.

== History ==
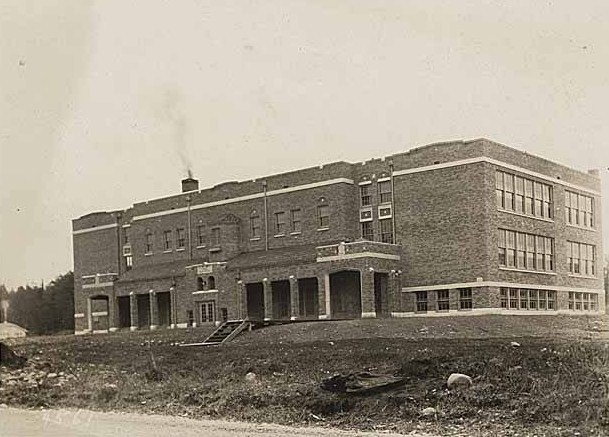
TaHoMa High School, 1926. Now Tahoma Elementary School.

The first large public school building in the Maple Valley area to serve secondary students was the Maple Valley Grade School, which opened in 1920 and housed grades one through twelve. In 1926, the Taylor, Hobart, and Maple Valley school districts merged to create a cooperative high school district and purchased a parcel of property for the construction of a dedicated local secondary school. This school, known as TaHoMa High School, opened in 1927 and held both junior and senior high students of the area for many years. After several remodels, this first TaHoMa High School building became Tahoma Middle School.

A new building opened in 1974 as an open concept high school, while the previous building remained as the district's junior high. The open concept design proved unsatisfactory to the faculty at the time, and temporary walls were constructed early in the school building's life. In 1999, an intensive remodel of the Tahoma Senior High School building commenced. Following voter approval of a $10 million, four-year Instructional Technology Levy in 2006, the Tahoma School District outfitted the campus with wireless internet service, Activboard digital whiteboards, and upgraded computer labs.

The building faced struggles with overcrowding throughout the 21st century as Maple Valley experienced rapid growth. The district installed 17 portable classrooms, many of which were purchased for $1 from the neighboring Kent School District. These dilapidated rooms helped to drive voters to approve a $195 million bond in 2015 to build a new high school for the community. Ground was broken in June 2015, it was completed in July 2017, and it opened for the 2017–2018 school year. The previous Senior High building was converted to Maple View Middle School, while the first district high school building was converted to Tahoma Elementary School.

== Academics ==
The Washington State Office of Superintendent of Public Instruction reported the school's graduation rate as 94.5% for the 2023–24 school year, while the statewide graduation rate was reported as 82.8%.

The school offers a variety of tech prep, honors, Advanced Placement, and "College in the High School" courses from the University of Washington, Central Washington University, and Eastern Washington University, in addition to the district's school board-approved curriculum. A Running Start program is available through the nearby Green River College campus in Auburn. Tahoma High School's Outdoor Academy program, which integrates Health and Fitness, Science, and Language Arts, has received recognition statewide for its work in changing the concept of Physical Education.

Tahoma also participates in the annual We The People civics competition, led by teacher Gretchen Wulfing. The team has won the Washington state championship every year since 2013, subsequently attending competitions in Washington, D.C., and placing in the top 10 teams nationwide in 2013, 2015, 2016, 2018, 2019, and 2022.

Tahoma also houses the FIRST Robotics Competition team, Bear Metal, who has been historically successful since its founding in 2007.

== About the school ==
Tahoma high school is relatively diverse in culture and language among its student population. The enrollment rate of minorities are 34%, which is almost all students that are enrolled and 19% of those students are economically disadvantaged. This school has an average of 2,890 students enrolled every year. Tahoma is also ranked 49th out of 300 in Washington State. As other high schools, Tahoma provides students with Advanced Placement exams for students who want to challenge themselves in preparation for college

== Enrollment ==
| School Years | 2015–16 | 2016–17 | 2017–18 | 2018–19 | 2019–20 | 2020–21 | 2021–22 | 2022–23 | 2023–24 |
| Total Student Enrollment | 1,818 | 1,827 | 2,611 | 2,671 | 2,751 | 2,743 | 2,766 | 2,810 | 2,890 |

=== Race/Ethnicity ===
In 2023–2024, Tahoma's enrollment number is 2,890. In detail, out of the 2,890 students, 11 (0.38%) were American Indian/Alaska Natives, 285 (9.86%) were Asian, 105 (3.63%) were Black/African American, 349 (12.08%) were Hispanic or Latino of any race(s), 16 (0.55%) were Native Hawaiian/Other Pacific Islander, 256 (8.86%) were Two or More Races, and 1,868 (64.64%) were White.

== Athletics ==
Tahoma High School has been a part of the Cascade Division of the North Puget Sound League since the 2016–17 school year. They were previously members of the South Puget Sound League.

Tahoma students participate in the following sports and athletic activities:

- Fall Sports: Boys' Tennis, Cross Country, Football, Girls' Soccer, Girls' Swim and Dive, Golf, and Volleyball.
- Winter Sports: Boys' Basketball, Boys' Swim, Dance, Girls' Basketball, Gymnastics, and Wrestling.
- Spring Sports: Baseball, Boys' Soccer, Fast Pitch, Girls' Tennis, and Track.

== Notable alumni ==
- Lucia Flores-Wiseman – singer/songwriter
- Zan Fiskum – singer/songwriter
- Brandi Carlile – singer/songwriter
- Omare Lowe – NFL football player
- Jens Pulver – mixed martial arts fighter
- Tayler Saucedo – MLB pitcher
- UMI – singer/songwriter
- Iris Scott – Artist
