= Green-to-Cedar Rivers Trail =

Rail trail in Maple Valley, Washington

Coordinates: 47°23′54″N 122°02′36″W

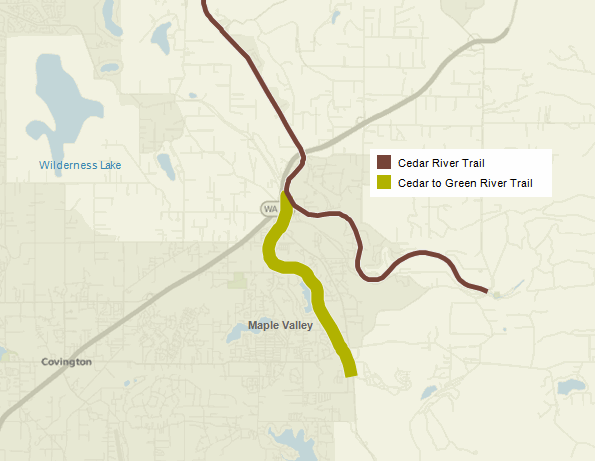
- Green-to-Cedar Rivers Trail route map
- Length: 3 miles (4.8 km)
- Location: King County, Washington
- Use: Non-motorized use
- Surface: Soft

The Green-to-Cedar Rivers Trail, also known as the Lake Wilderness Trail and Cedar to Green River Trail, is a 3-mile (4.8 km) soft surface rail trail in King County, Washington, United States. This trail is designated for non-motorized use and connects Maple Valley to Lake Wilderness. At its northern terminus in Maple Valley, it connects to the Cedar River Trail; the southern terminus is State Route 516. The King County government plans to extend the trail south to the Green River via Lake Sawyer Regional Park and Flaming Geyser State Park.
