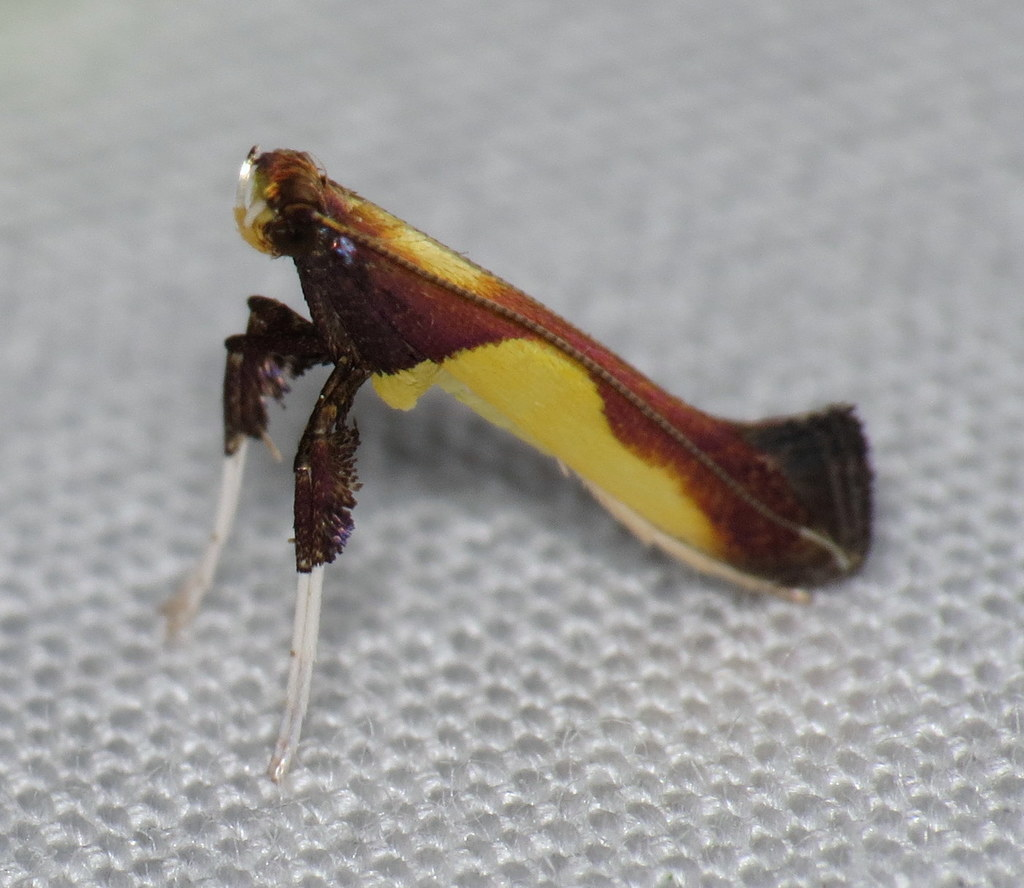

Scientific classification
- Kingdom: Animalia
- Phylum: Arthropoda
- Clade: Pancrustacea
- Class: Insecta
- Order: Lepidoptera
- Family: Gracillariidae
- Genus: Caloptilia
- Species: C. porphyretica

Binomial name
- Caloptilia porphyretica (Braun, 1923)

= Caloptilia porphyretica =

Blueberry leafminer

Species of moth

Caloptilia porphyretica (blueberry leafminer) is a moth of the family Gracillariidae. It is known from North Carolina and New Jersey in the United States.

It is a frequent pest in commercial highbush blueberries in New Jersey. There are at least three generations per year.

The larvae feed on Rhododendron species, including Rhododendron occidentale. They mine the leaves of their host plant.
