= East Renton Highlands, Washington =

- Census-designated place
- Location of East Renton Highlands, Washington
- Coordinates: 47°28′52″N 122°07′24″W
- Country: United States
- State: Washington
- County: King

Area
  - Total: 11.4 sq mi (29.5 km^{2})
  - Land: 11.3 sq mi (29.3 km^{2})
  - Water: 0.077 sq mi (0.2 km^{2})
- Elevation: 545 ft (166 m)

Population (2020)
  - Total: 11,937
  - Density: 980/sq mi (380/km^{2})
- Time zone: UTC-8 (PST)
  - Summer (DST): UTC-7 (PDT)
- FIPS code: 53-19857
- GNIS feature ID: 2408034

East Renton Highlands is a census-designated place (CDP) in King County, Washington, United States, located between Issaquah and Renton. The population was 11,937 at the 2020 census.

== History ==
In 1996, the city of Renton proposed an annexation of the Maplewood Heights area, part of the plateau's western edge, but it was rejected by voters. A competing proposal to create a new city named Briarwood was also rejected by voters in a March 1998 election.

East Renton Highlands is part of the potential annexation area (PAA) of Renton, but in February 2007 voters defeated a 1,475-acre (5.97 km^{2}) annexation proposal 3 to 1. In January 2008, the Renton City Council accepted a petition, using the 60% Direct Method, for the proposed Liberty Annexation: 193 acres (0.78 km^{2}) located in the vicinity of 156th Avenue SE, SE 144th Street, and SE 134th Street.

== Geography ==
East Renton Highlands is bordered to the west by the city of Renton, to the east by the Mirrormont CDP, and to the southeast by the Hobart CDP. To the south is the Cedar River. East Renton Highlands is 17 miles (27 km) southeast of downtown Seattle.

According to the United States Census Bureau, the CDP has a total area of 11.4 square miles (29.5 km^{2}), of which 11.3 square miles (29.3 km^{2}) are land and 0.1 square miles (0.2 km^{2}), or 0.57%, are water.

== Demographics ==
Historical population
Census	Pop.	Note	%±
1980	12,033		—
1990	13,218		9.8%
2000	13,264		0.3%
2010	11,140		−16.0%
2020	11,937		7.2%
U.S. Decennial Census; 1970 1980 1990; 2000 2010

East Renton Highlands first appeared as a census designated place in the 1980 U.S. census.

=== 2020 census ===
As of the 2020 census, East Renton Highlands had a population of 11,937. The median age was 41.9 years. 23.9% of residents were under the age of 18 and 16.9% of residents were 65 years of age or older. For every 100 females there were 100.8 males, and for every 100 females age 18 and over there were 97.8 males age 18 and over.

93.1% of residents lived in urban areas, while 6.9% lived in rural areas.

There were 4,164 households in East Renton Highlands, of which 35.6% had children under the age of 18 living in them. Of all households, 64.4% were married-couple households, 12.8% were households with a male householder and no spouse or partner present, and 17.2% were households with a female householder and no spouse or partner present. About 16.0% of all households were made up of individuals and 8.0% had someone living alone who was 65 years of age or older.

There were 4,265 housing units, of which 2.4% were vacant. The homeowner vacancy rate was 0.5% and the rental vacancy rate was 3.1%.

Racial composition as of the 2020 census
Race	Number	Percent
White	8,644	72.4%
Black or African American	205	1.7%
American Indian and Alaska Native	102	0.9%
Asian	1,079	9.0%
Native Hawaiian and Other Pacific Islander	41	0.3%
Some other race	453	3.8%
Two or more races	1,413	11.8%
Hispanic or Latino (of any race)	1,137	9.5%

=== 2000 census ===
As of the census of 2000, there were 13,264 people, 4,668 households, and 3,743 families residing in the CDP. The population density was 1,055.1 people per square mile (407.4/km^{2}). There were 4,760 housing units at an average density of 378.6/sq mi (146.2/km^{2}). The racial makeup of the CDP was 90.76% White, 1.46% African American, 0.86% Native American, 3.10% Asian, 0.11% Pacific Islander, 1.01% from other races, and 2.71% from two or more races. Hispanic or Latino of any race were 3.43% of the population.

There were 4,668 households, out of which 37.9% had children under the age of 18 living with them, 68.3% were married couples living together, 8.1% had a female householder with no husband present, and 19.8% were non-families. 14.4% of all households were made up of individuals, and 3.7% had someone living alone who was 65 years of age or older. The average household size was 2.83 and the average family size was 3.12.

In the CDP the population was spread out, with 26.7% under the age of 18, 6.5% from 18 to 24, 30.6% from 25 to 44, 28.4% from 45 to 64, and 7.8% who were 65 years of age or older. The median age was 38 years. For every 100 females there were 104.0 males. For every 100 females age 18 and over, there were 101.5 males.

The median income for a household in the CDP was $65,268, and the median income for a family was $65,855. Males had a median income of $50,149 versus $33,917 for females. The per capita income for the CDP was $27,089. About 3.2% of families and 4.5% of the population were below the poverty line, including 3.1% of those under age 18 and 6.1% of those age 65 or over.

== Education ==
Most of the community is in the Issaquah School District. A portion is in the Renton School District, and another portion is in the Tahoma School District.
