= Caloptilia ferruginella =

Scientific classification
- Domain: Eukaryota
- Kingdom: Animalia
- Phylum: Arthropoda
- Class: Insecta
- Order: Lepidoptera
- Family: Gracillariidae
- Genus: Caloptilia
- Species: C. ferruginella

Binomial name
- Caloptilia ferruginella (Braun, 1918)

Species of moth

Caloptilia ferruginella is a moth of the family Gracillariidae. It is known from the United States (California).

The larvae feed on Rhododendron occidentale. They mine the leaves of their host plant. The mine has the form of a tentiform mine on the underside of the leaf, later the larva rolls the leaf from the tip down into a cone.
