= Mirrormont, Washington =

- Census-designated place
- Location of Mirrormont, Washington
- Coordinates: 47°27′33″N 122°00′23″W
- Country: United States
- State: Washington
- County: King

Area
  - Total: 10.41 sq mi (26.97 km^{2})
  - Land: 10.37 sq mi (26.86 km^{2})
  - Water: 0.042 sq mi (0.11 km^{2})
- Elevation: 804 ft (245 m)

Population (2020)
  - Total: 3,858
  - Density: 353/sq mi (136.2/km^{2})
- Time zone: UTC-8 (Pacific (PST))
  - Summer (DST): UTC-7 (PDT)
- FIPS code: 53-46215
- GNIS feature ID: 2408841

Mirrormont is a census-designated place (CDP) in King County, Washington, United States, south of Issaquah. The population was 3,858 at the 2020 census. Within the last decade, the area has seen a shift in development as larger homes have been constructed in Cedar Grove, the Highlands at Tiger Mountain and Mirrormont.

== Geography ==
Mirrormont is located in central King County and is bordered to the west by East Renton Highlands and to the south by Hobart. Part of Tiger Mountain occupies the northeast portion of the CDP. Washington State Route 18 runs along the southeast edge of the CDP, leading northeast 6 miles (10 km) to Interstate 90 near Snoqualmie and southwest 17 miles (27 km) to Auburn.

According to the United States Census Bureau, the Mirrormont CDP has a total area of 10.4 square miles (27.0 km^{2}), of which 10.4 square miles (26.9 km^{2}) are land and 0.04 square miles (0.1 km^{2}), or 0.42%, are water.

== Demographics ==
Historical population
Census	Pop.	Note	%±
1990	2,360		—
2000	3,804		61.2%
2010	3,659		−3.8%
2020	3,858		5.4%
U.S. Decennial Census; 2020 Census

As of the census of 2000, there were 3,804 people, 1,330 households, and 1,110 families residing in the CDP. The population density was 367.3 people per square mile (141.8/km^{2}). There were 1,365 housing units at an average density of 131.8/sq mi (50.9/km^{2}). The racial makeup of the CDP was 94.03% White, 0.45% African American, 0.58% Native American, 1.37% Asian, 0.13% Pacific Islander, 0.81% from other races, and 2.63% from two or more races. Hispanic or Latino of any race were 1.68% of the population.

There were 1,330 households, out of which 39.4% had children under the age of 18 living with them, 76.6% were married couples living together, 4.0% had a female householder with no husband present, and 16.5% were non-families. 12.2% of all households were made up of individuals, and 2.7% had someone living alone who was 65 years of age or older. The average household size was 2.81 and the average family size was 3.05.

In the CDP the population was spread out, with 26.9% under the age of 18, 4.8% from 18 to 24, 27.9% from 25 to 44, 32.5% from 45 to 64, and 7.8% who were 65 years of age or older. The median age was 41 years. For every 100 females there were 103.7 males. For every 100 females age 18 and over, there were 100.8 males.

The median income for a household in the CDP was $87,945, and the median income for a family was $90,413. Males had a median income of $70,365 versus $38,929 for females. The per capita income for the CDP was $35,200. About 3.1% of families and 5.7% of the population were below the poverty line, including 6.3% of those under age 18 and 4.5% of those age 65 or over.

== Schools ==
District: Issaquah School District 411 (which includes the majority of Mirrormont)

Schools: Maple Hills Elementary, Maywood Middle School, Liberty Senior High School

A portion of Mirrormont is in the Tahoma School District.
