= Pipe Lake–Lake Lucerne =

Lake in King County, Washington

Pipe Lake and Lake Lucerne
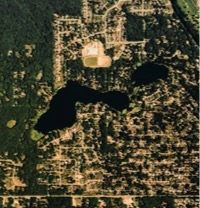
- Pipe Lake (larger, lower left) and Lake Lucerne (smaller, upper right) connected by a natural canal

- Location within Washington (state) Location within the United States
- Location: Covington, Washington and Maple Valley, Washington
- Coordinates: 47°21′58″N 122°03′12″W
- Basin countries: United States
- Surface area: Pipe Lake: 52 acres (21 ha); Lake Lucerne: 16 acres (6.5 ha)
- Max. depth: Pipe Lake: 65 ft (20 m); Lake Lucerne: 37 ft (11 m)

Pipe Lake and Lake Lucerne are two lakes joined by a natural canal in King County, Washington, United States. The larger Pipe Lake is located on the border of Covington and Maple Valley, while the smaller Lake Lucerne is located entirely within Maple Valley. Both lakes are completely surrounded by private property.

== Description ==
The canal between the two lakes was once spanned by a log bridge, which was used when logging was the predominant industry in the area. The bridge has since been destroyed, but it is unclear why. Pipe Lake drains into Lake Lucerne, which has an overall watershed area of 409 acres (166 ha). Both lakes enjoy high water quality. Measurements have been taken consistently since 1996, and indicate that they are oligotrophic. Neither lake has any public access, as they are completely surrounded by private property.

== Incidents ==
In 2012, between 100 and 200 US gallons (380 and 760 L) of raw sewage spilled into Pipe Lake due to a sewage blockage. Seattle Public Utilities determined that the lake was still safe for swimming. The blockage was cleared by flushing the sewer lines, and the resulting odor was expected to end within two days.

The two lakes are the only body of water where Hydrilla (waterthyme), an invasive aquatic weed, has been found in the state of Washington. It is hypothesized that the waterthyme originated from an aquarium dumped in the lake or alongside an exotic water lily. The lake has been intensely monitored to eradicate the weed and stop it from spreading elsewhere. The two lakes are among several in South King County that have suffered from rapid development, causing ecosystem degradation.
