= Enumclaw School District =

School district in Washington, United States

Location
- 2929 McDougall Avenue Enumclaw, Washington, 98022; United States
- Coordinates: 47.1885031°N 122.0087743°W

District information
- Type: Public
- Mottoes: Inspiring students to learn, lead and impact their community and the world.; All students achieving at high levels.; Serving the students of Enumclaw and Black Diamond.
- Grades: K-12
- Established: 1887; 139 years ago
- Superintendent: Dr. Shaun V. Carey
- Deputy superintendent(s): Jill Burnes
- Budget: $64,963,375 (2020 - 2021 School Year)
- NCES District ID: 5300001

Students and staff
- Students: 4,250 (2021-2022)
- Athletic conference: Kingco Athletic Conference

Other information
- Website: www.enumclaw.wednet.edu

Enumclaw School District No. 216 is a public school district located in southern King County, Washington, headquartered in Enumclaw.

== Boundary ==
The district's boundary includes all of Enumclaw, the vast majority of Black Diamond, areas with Ravensdale postal addresses, and several unincorporated areas.

The district is bordered by the Tahoma School District to the north and to its northwest sits the fourth most populous school district in Washington state, the Kent School District. To its west lies the Auburn School District and below it in the south is the White River School District, which is in Pierce County.

== Schools ==
The Enumclaw School District has eight active schools in total, five elementary schools, two middle schools, and one high school.

=== High schools ===
- Enumclaw High School - Students: 1,325 (2021 - 2022) - Teachers: 73 (2020 - 2021) - Mascot: Hornets - School Colors: Maroon + Gold

=== Middle schools ===
- Enumclaw Middle School - Students: 489 (2021 - 2022) - Teachers: 33 (2020 - 2021)
- Thunder Mountain Middle School - Students: 492 (2021 - 2022) - Teachers: 28 (2020 - 2021)

=== Elementary schools ===
- Black Diamond Elementary School - Students: 393 (2021 - 2022) - Teachers: 30 (2020 - 2021)
- Byron Kibler Elementary School - Students: 410 (2021 - 2022) - Teachers: 37 (2020 - 2021)
- Southwood Elementary School - Students: 300 (2021 - 2022) - Teachers: 29 (2020 - 2021)
- Sunrise Elementary School - Students: 392 (2021 - 2022) - Teachers: 32 (2020 - 2021)
- Westwood Elementary School - Students: 288 (2021 - 2022) - Teachers: 32 (2020 - 2021)

== Demographics ==
=== Student demographics ===
Students enrolled per school year
School Year	Number of Students Enrolled in ESD
2009 - 2010	4,772
2010 - 2011	4,654
2011 - 2012	4,272
2012 - 2013	4,554
2013 - 2014	4,461
2014 - 2015	4,106
2015 - 2016	4,103
2016 - 2017	4,077
2017 - 2018	4,145
2018 - 2019	4,155
2019 - 2020	4,301
2020 - 2021	4,145
2021 - 2022	4,250
2022 - 2023	4,452
2023 - 2024	4,562
2024 - 2025	4,559

Enrollment by gender per school year
Gender	2015 - 2016	2016 - 2017	2017 - 2018	2018 - 2019	2019 - 2020	2020 - 2021	2021 - 2022	2022 - 2023	2023 - 2024	2024 - 2025
Male	2146 (52.3%)	2018 (51.7%)	2186 (52.7%)	2176 (52.4%)	2242 (52.1%)	2163 (52.2%)	2242 (52.8%)	2348 (52.7%)	2399 (52.6%)	2421 (53.1%)
Female	1957 (47.7%)	1969 (48.3%)	1959 (47.3%)	1978 (47.6%)	2058 (47.8%)	1981 (47.8%)	2007 (47.2%)	2097 (47.1%)	2156 (47.3%)	2133 (46.8%)
Gender X	0 (0.0%)	0 (0.0%)	0 (0.0%)	1 (0.02%)	1 (0.02%)	2 (0.02%)	6 (0.1%)	7 (0.2%)	7 (0.2%)	5 (0.1%)

Enrollment by ethnicity per school year
Race / Ethnicity	2015 - 2016	2016 - 2017	2017 - 2018	2018 - 2019	2019 - 2020	2020 - 2021	2021 - 2022	2022 - 2023	2023 - 2024	2024 - 2025
White	3213 (78.3%)	3175 (77.9%)	3221 (77.7%)	3197 (76.9%)	3263 (75.9%)	3072 (74.1%)	3087 (72.6%)	3200 (71.9%)	3233 (70.9%)	3184 (69.8%)
Hispanic / Latino of any race(s)	606 (14.8%)	619 (15.2%)	642 (15.5%)	677 (16.3%)	728 (16.9%)	739 (17.8%)	770 (18.1%)	804 (18.1%)	832 (18.2%)	842 (18.5%)
Two or More Races	162 (3.9%)	168 (4.1%)	176 (4.2%)	173 (4.2%)	190 (4.4%)	204 (4.9%)	229 (5.4%)	233 (5.2%)	259 (5.7%)	273 (6.0%)
American Indian / Alaska Native	53 (1.9%)	47 (1.15%)	43 (1.03%)	49 (1.17%)	48 (1.11%)	43 (1.03%)	34 (0.8%)	35 (0.8%)	43 (0.9%)	42 (0.9%)
Asian	23 (0.56%)	24 (0.58%)	27 (0.65%)	22 (0.52%)	28 (0.65%)	39 (0.94%)	75 (1.8%)	120 (2.7%)	143 (3.1%)	166 (3.6%)
Black / African American	30 (0.73%)	29 (0.71%)	22 (0.53%)	28 (0.67%)	33 (0.76%)	34 (0.82%)	42 (1.0%)	46 (1.0%)	43 (0.9%)	39 (0.9%)
Native Hawaiian / Other Pacific Islander	16 (0.38%)	15 (0.36%)	14 (0.33%)	9 (0.21%)	11 (0.25%)	14 (0.33%)	13 (0.3%)	14 (0.3%)	9 (0.2%)	13 (0.3%)
Total Minorities	890 (21.7%)	902 (22.1%)	924 (22.3%)	958 (23.1%)	1038 (24.1%)	1073 (25.9%)	1163 (27.4%)	1252 (28.1%)	1329 (29.0%)	1375 (30.2%)

=== Classroom teacher demographics ===
Number of classroom teachers per school year
School Year	Amount of Classroom Teachers at ESD
2017 - 2018	227
2018 - 2019	234
2019 - 2020	240
2020 - 2021	254
2021 - 2022	285
2022 - 2023	253
2023 - 2024	258

Number of classroom teachers by gender per school year
Gender	2017 - 2018	2018 - 2019	2019 - 2020	2020 - 2021	2021 - 2022	2022 - 2023	2023 - 2024
Female	167 (73.6%)	177 (75.6%)	181 (75.4%)	190 (74.8%)	201 (70.5%)	193 (76.3%)	193 (78.4%)
Male	60 (26.4%)	57 (24.4%)	59 (24.6%)	64 (25.2%)	63 (22.1%)	56 (22.1%)	59 (22.9%)
Gender X	0 (0.0%)	0 (0.0%)	0 (0.0%)	0 (0.0%)	0 (0.0%)	0 (0.0%)	0 (0.0%)
Gender Not Provided	4 (1.8%)	6 (2.6%)	1 (0.4%)	8 (3.1%)	21 (7.4%)	4 (1.6%)	6 (2.3%)

Number of classroom teachers by race / ethnicity per school year
Race / Ethnicity	2017 - 2018	2018 - 2019	2019 - 2020	2020 - 2021	2021 - 2022	2022 - 2023	2023 - 2024
White	220 (96.9%)	228 (97.4%)	233 (97.1%)	246 (96.9%)	248 (87.0%)	237 (93.7%)	241 (93.4%)
Hispanic / Latino of any race(s)	3 (1.3%)	3 (1.3%)	4 (1.7%)	4 (1.6%)	6 (2.1%)	5 (2.0%)	6 (2.3%)
Two or More Races	1 (0.4%)	1 (0.4%)	1 (0.4%)	1 (0.4%)	5 (1.8%)	4 (1.6%)	2 (0.8%)
American Indian / Alaska Native	1 (0.4%)	0 (0.0%)	0 (0.0%)	0 (0.0%)	0 (0.0%)	0 (0.0%)	0 (0.0%)
Asian	0 (0.0%)	1 (0.4%)	1 (0.4%)	1 (0.4%)	3 (1.1%)	1 (0.4%)	1 (0.4%)
Black / African American	0 (0.0%)	0 (0.0%)	0 (0.0%)	0 (0.0%)	2 (0.7%)	2 (0.8%)	2 (0.8%)
Native Hawaiian / Other Pacific Islander	1 (0.4%)	1 (0.4%)	1 (0.4%)	1 (0.4%)	0 (0.0%)	0 (0.0%)	0 (0.0%)
Race/Ethnicity Not Provided	1 (0.4%)	0 (0.0%)	0 (0.0%)	1 (0.4%)	21 (7.4%)	4 (1.6%)	6 (2.3%)
Total Minorities	7 (3.0%)	6 (2.5%)	7 (2.9%)	6 (2.4%)	16 (5.7%)	12 (4.8%)	11 (4.3%)
