= Lake Wilderness Arboretum =

Arboretum in Maple Valley, Washington, United States

Coordinates: 47°22′50″N 122°02′27″W

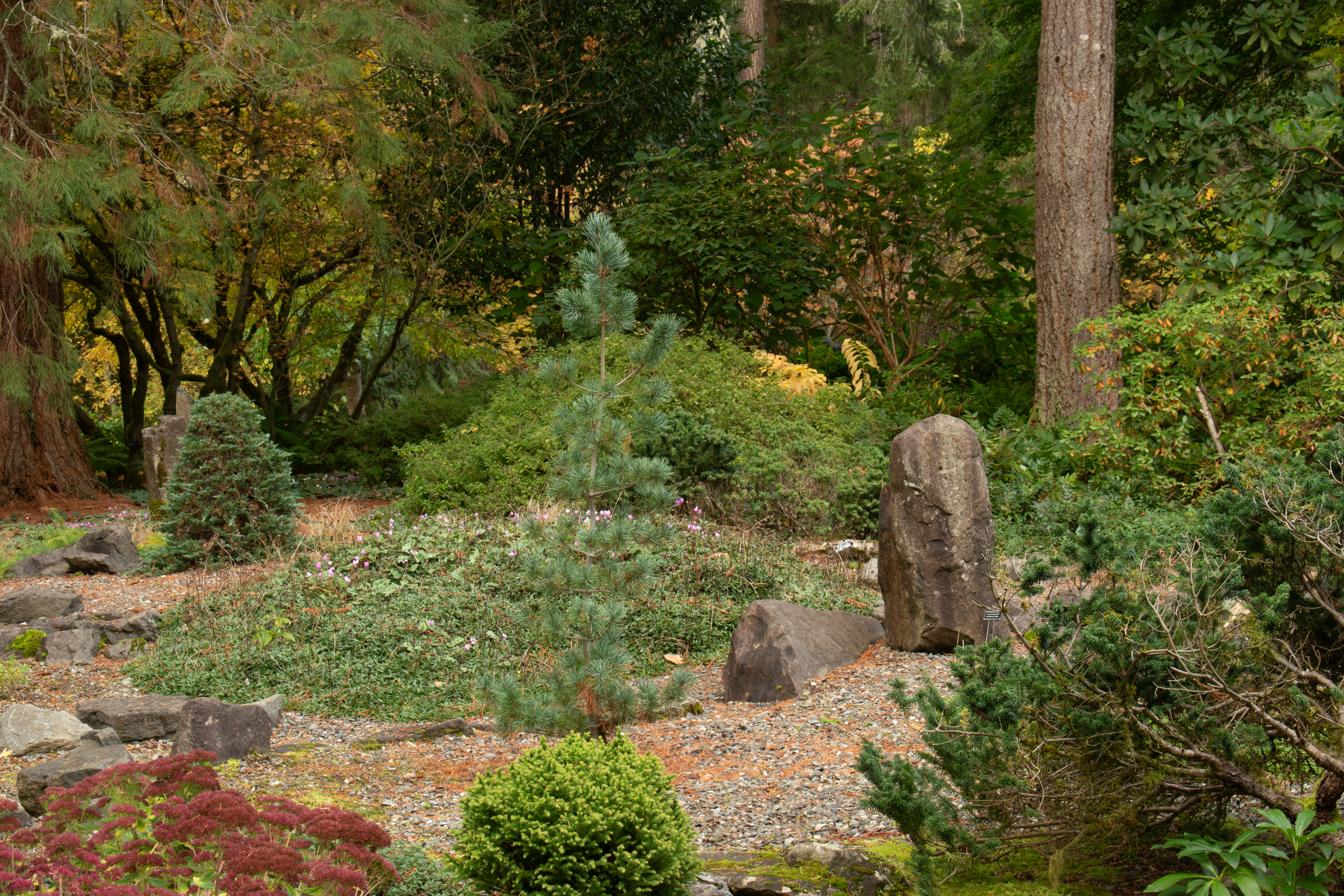
- A section of the arboretum.
- Interactive map of Lake Wilderness Arboretum
- Type: Arboretum
- Location: Maple Valley, Washington
- Area: 40 acres (16 ha)
- Website: www.lakewildernessarboretum.org

Lake Wilderness Arboretum, known for a time as the South King County Arboretum, is a 40-acre (16 ha) arboretum in Maple Valley, Washington. The arboretum is open daily without charge and is located off the Lake Wilderness Trail.

== Collections ==
In addition to a focus on Northwest native plants, the Arboretum has one of the world's largest collections of the Western Azalea (Rhododendron occidentale), with over 200 selections of the species.

== Management ==
The Lake Wilderness Arboretum is managed by the Lake Wilderness Arboretum Foundation, a 501(c)3 non-profit organization. The arboretum was first established as a nonprofit organization in 1965, with its initial design completed and implemented in 1970. The Western Azalea Garden was dedicated in June 2000.

The recently incorporated City of Maple Valley finalized the transfer of Lake Wilderness Park and the Arboretum from King County in January 2003. In April 2003, the name was changed from the original name, South King County Arboretum, to Lake Wilderness Arboretum. The name of the Arboretum Foundation was changed to Lake Wilderness Arboretum Foundation (LWAF) in 2007.

== Gallery ==
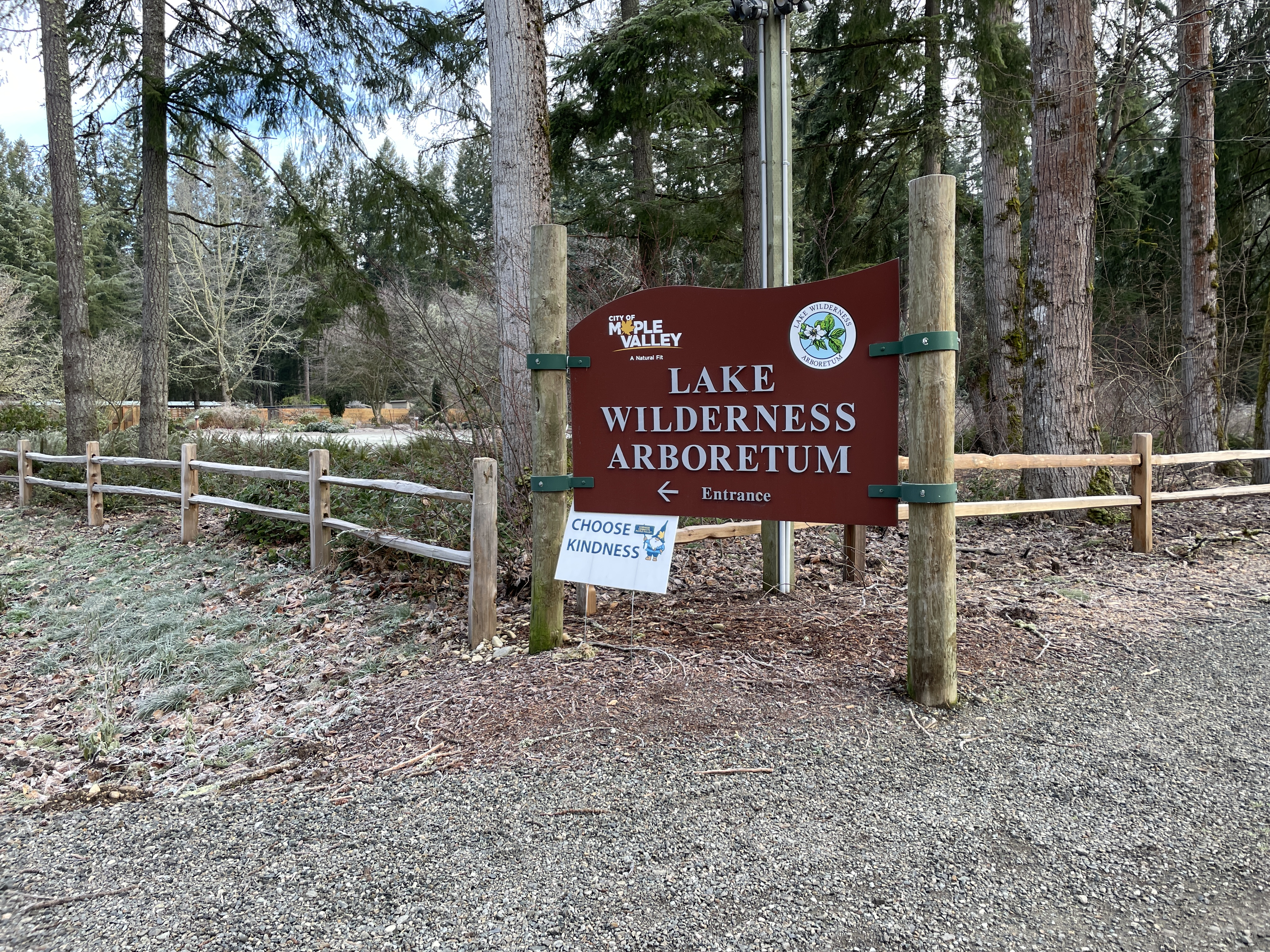

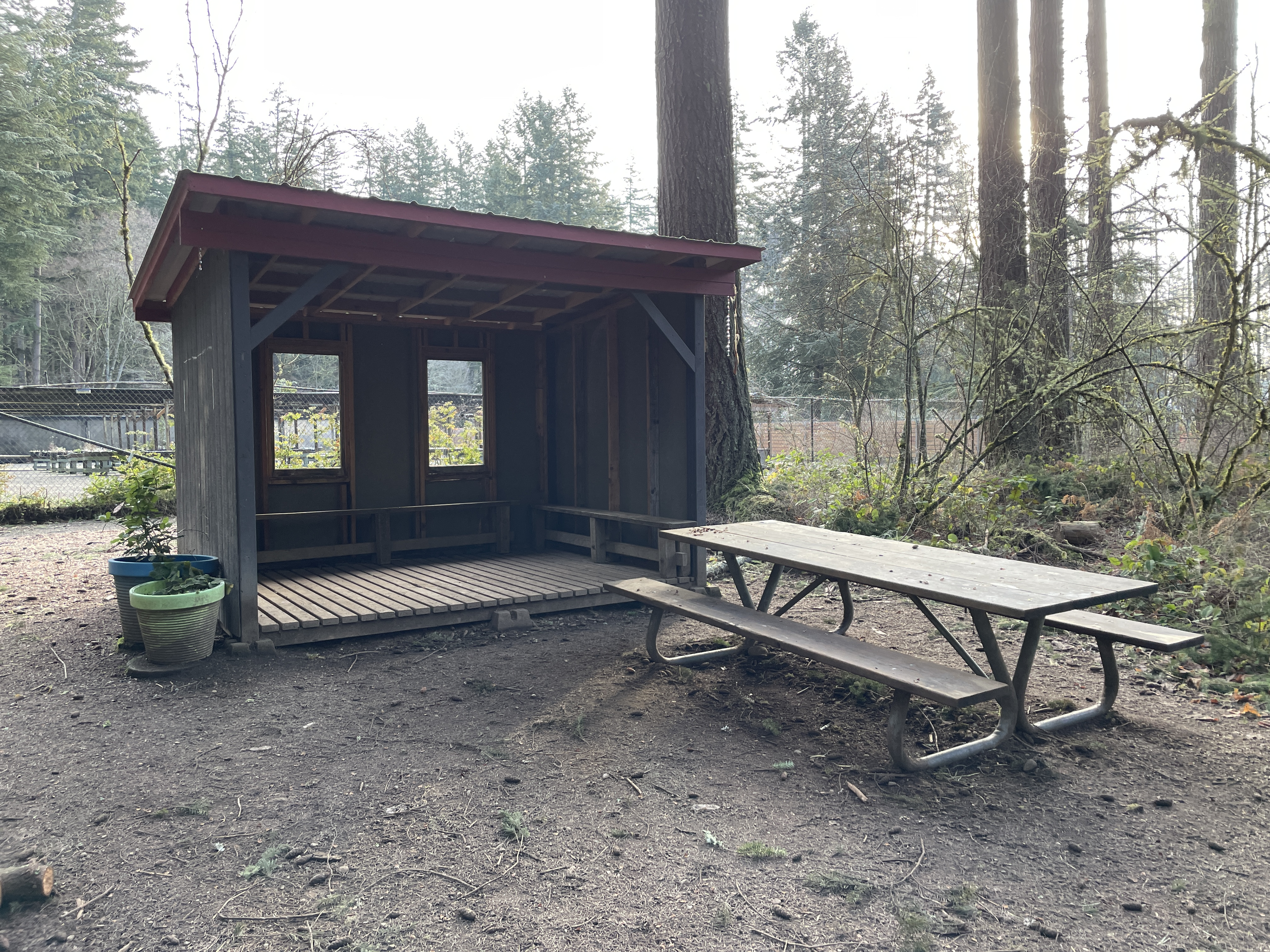

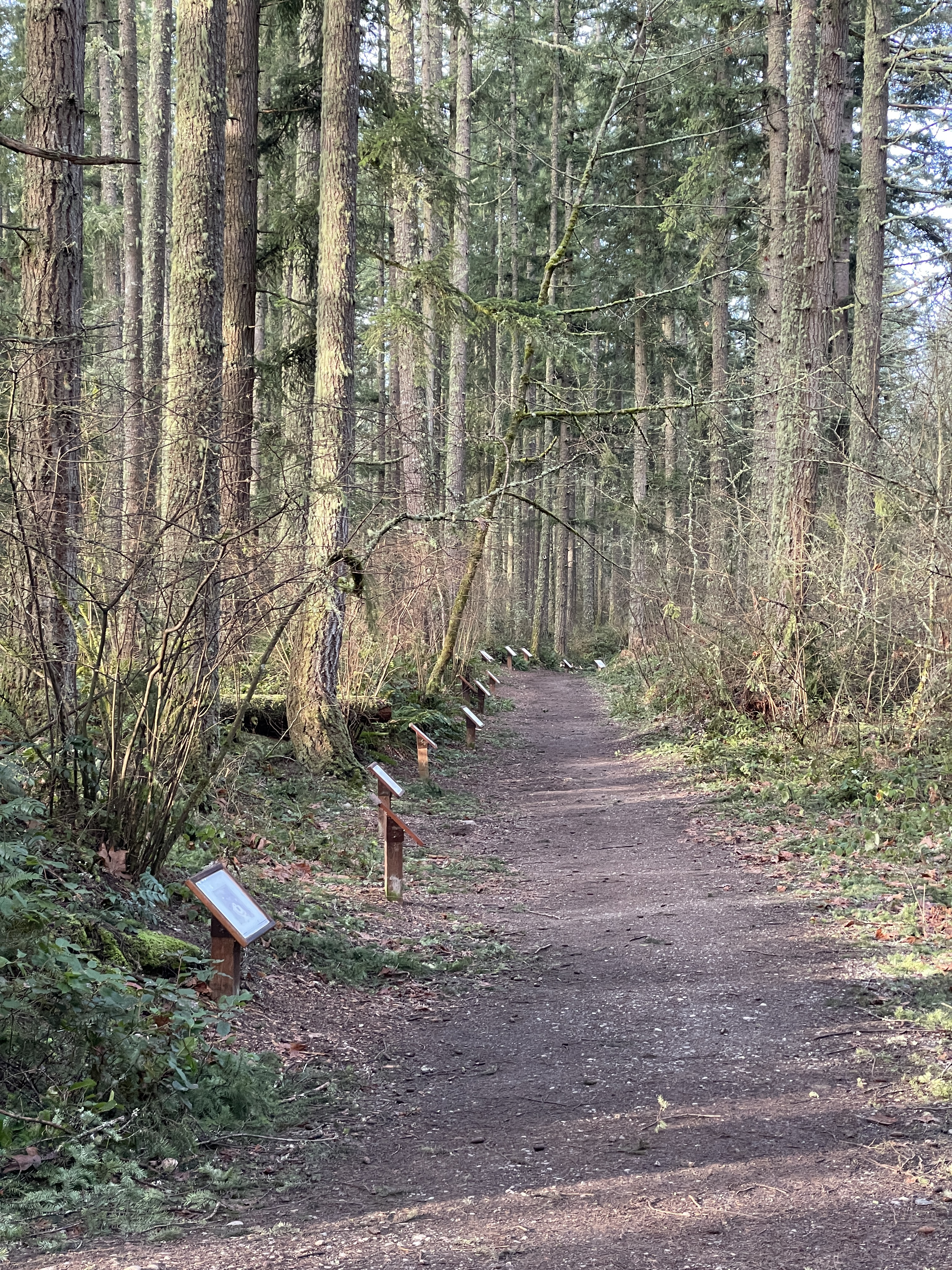

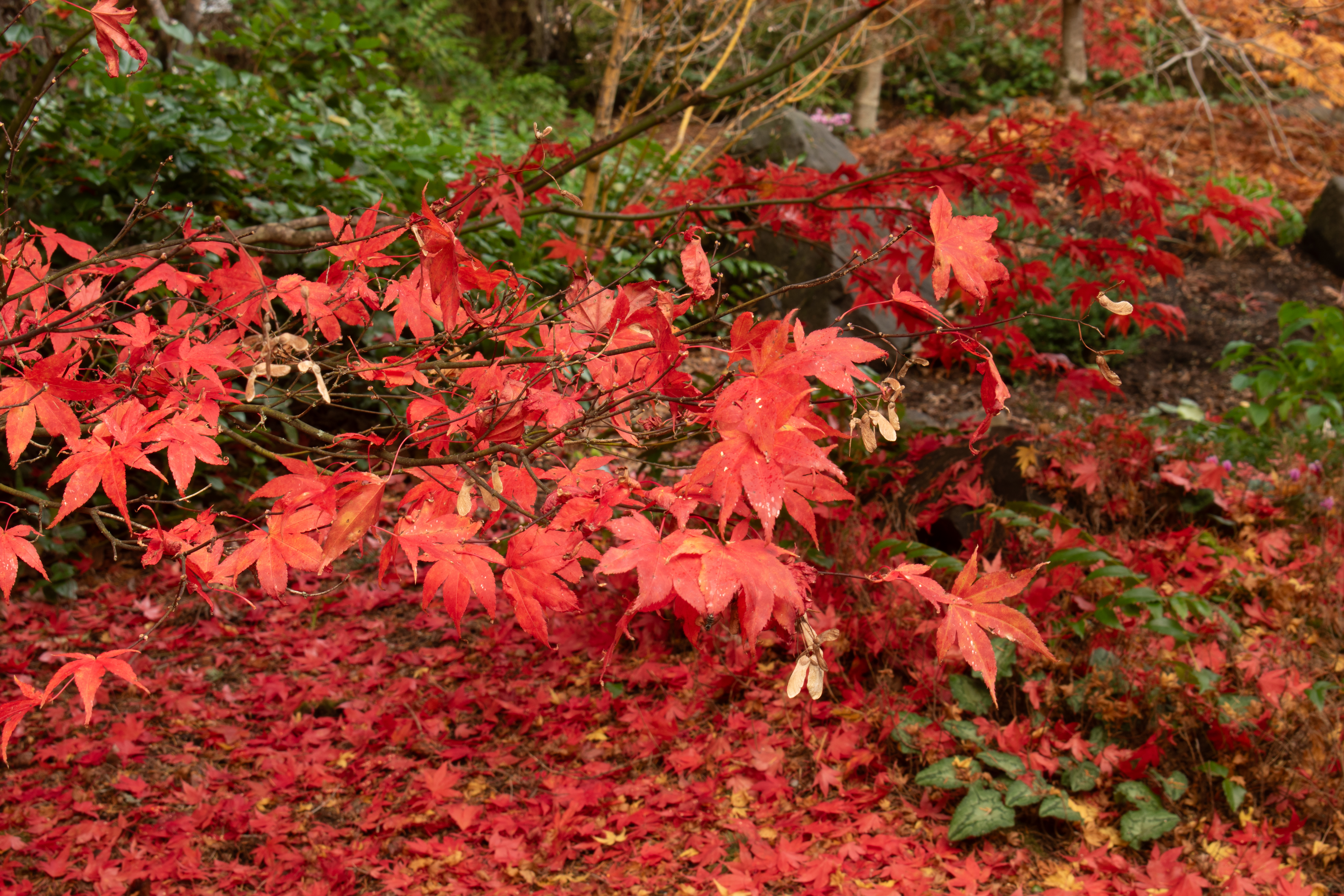

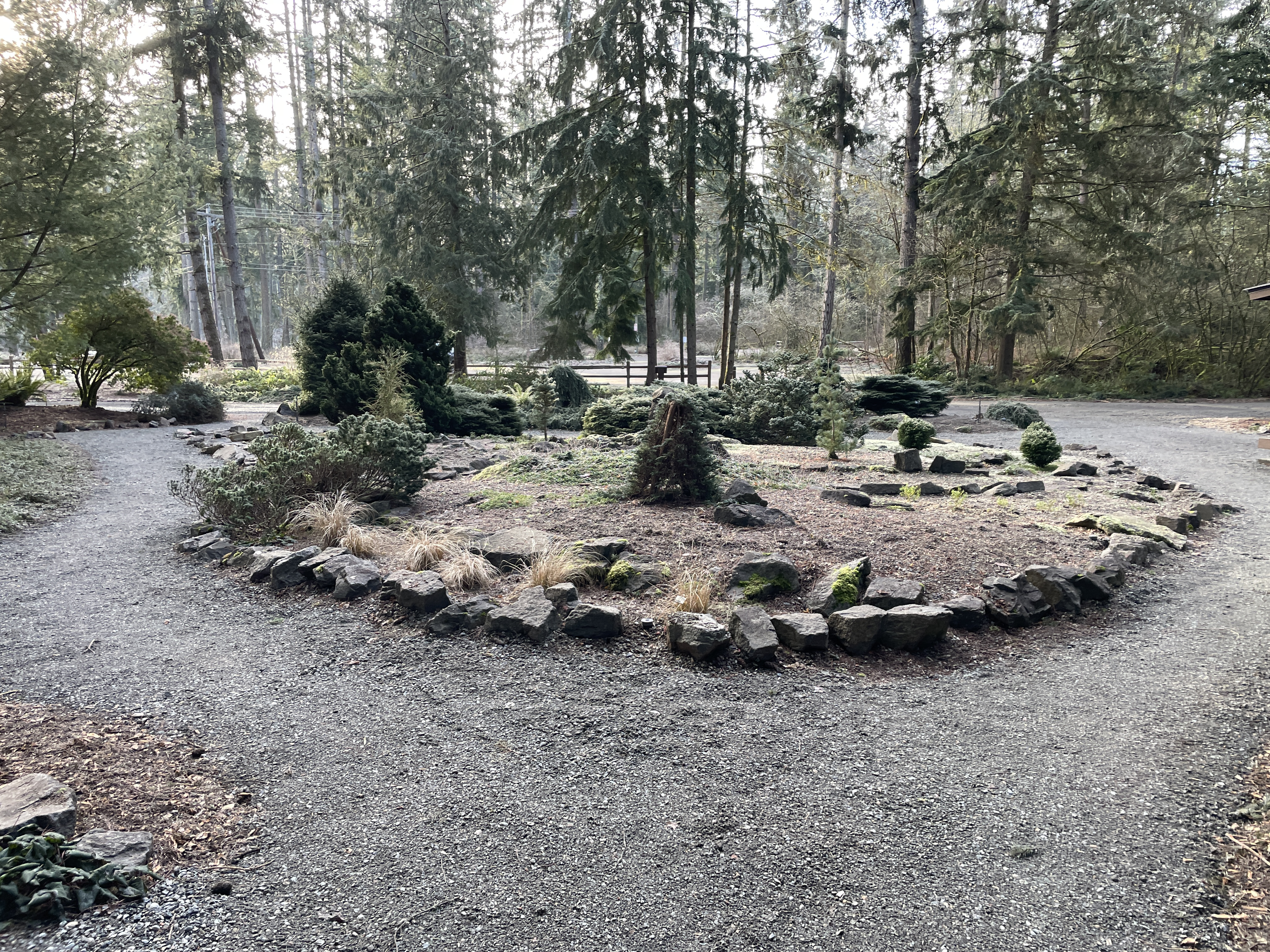

== See also ==
- List of botanical gardens in the United States
