= Hobart, Washington =

- Census-designated place
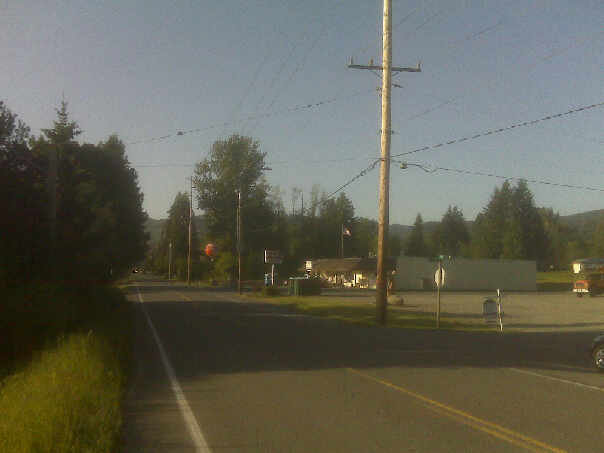
- Hobart post office and general store

- Location of Hobart, Washington
- Coordinates: 47°24′40″N 121°59′50″W
- Country: United States
- State: Washington
- County: King

Area
  - Total: 18.9 sq mi (49.0 km^{2})
  - Land: 18.8 sq mi (48.7 km^{2})
  - Water: 0.12 sq mi (0.3 km^{2})
- Elevation: 600 ft (180 m)

Population (2020)
  - Total: 6,767
  - Density: 331/sq mi (127.8/km^{2})
- Time zone: UTC-8 (PST)
  - Summer (DST): UTC-7 (PDT)
- ZIP code: 98025
- Area code: 425
- FIPS code: 53-31495
- GNIS feature ID: 2408393

Hobart is an unincorporated community and census-designated place (CDP) in King County, Washington, United States. The population was 6,767 at the 2020 census.

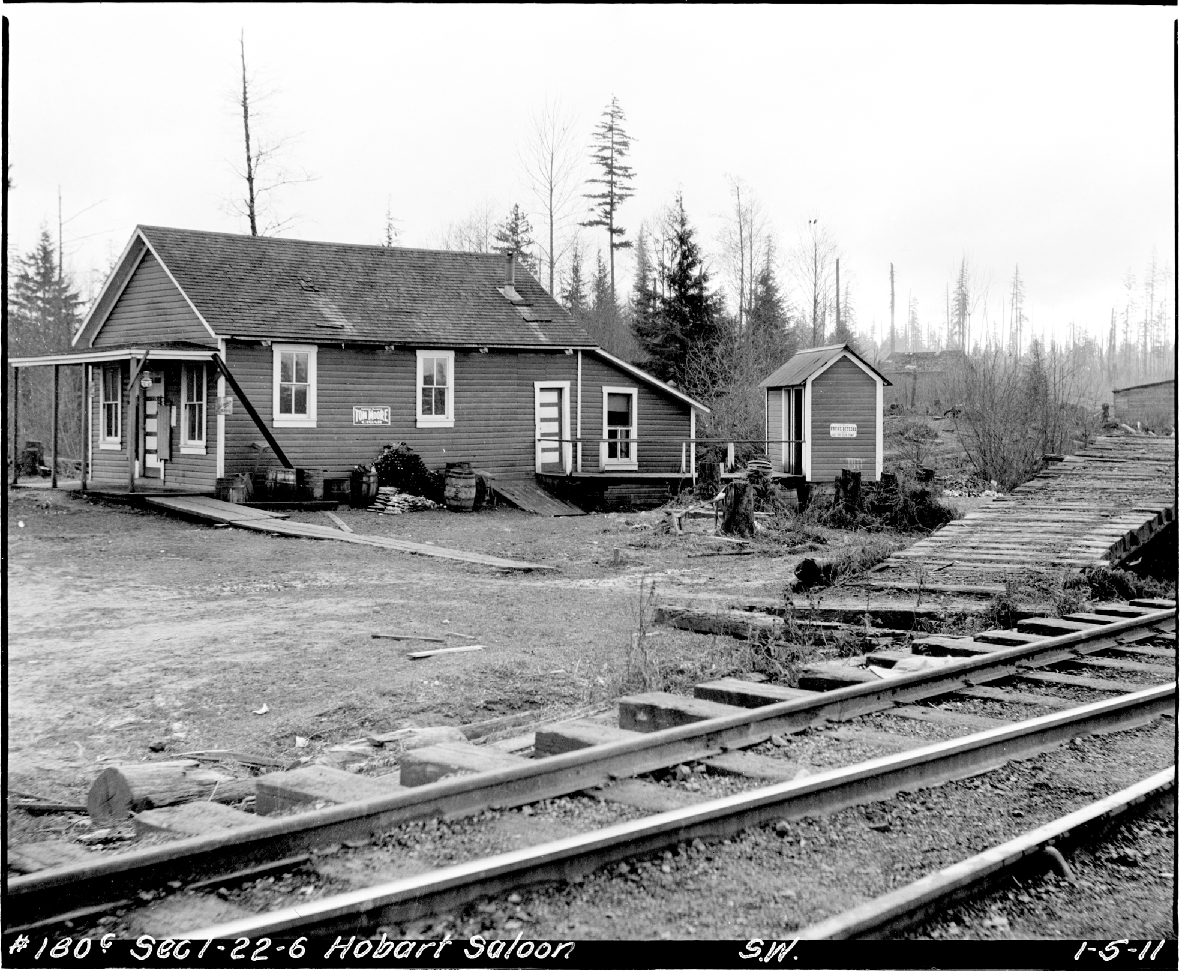
Hobart Saloon, 1911

Based on per capita income, one of the more reliable measures of affluence, Hobart ranks 31st of 522 areas in the state of Washington to be ranked. The Hobart area was first settled by loggers in 1879, and originally known as "Vine Maple Valley". The name was changed when deemed too long by the Post Office. The Hobart Post Office was first opened May 9, 1903 with William Sidebotham as first postmaster. A coal mine also operated in the area as late as 1947.

== Geography ==
Hobart is located in central King County and is bordered to the north by Mirrormont, to the northwest by East Renton Highlands, to the southwest by Maple Valley, and to the south by Ravensdale. 2,600-foot (790 m) Taylor Mountain rises to the northeast.

Washington State Route 18 passes through Hobart, leading northeast 9 miles (14 km) to Interstate 90 near Snoqualmie and southwest 15 miles (24 km) to Auburn. Seattle is 24 miles (39 km) to the northwest.

According to the United States Census Bureau, the Hobart CDP has a total area of 18.9 square miles (48.9 km^{2}), of which 18.8 square miles (48.6 km^{2}) are land and 0.1 square miles (0.3 km^{2}), or 0.60%, are water. The Cedar River runs along the southern and western edges of the community.

The town of Hobart was named in honor of Garret Augustus Hobart (June 3, 1844 – November 21, 1899), the 24th Vice President of the United States.

=== Climate ===
The region experiences warm (but not hot) and dry summers, with no average monthly temperatures above 71.6 °F. According to the Köppen Climate Classification system, Hobart has a warm-summer Mediterranean climate, abbreviated "Csb" on climate maps.

== Demographics ==
Historical population
| Census | Pop. | Note | %± |
|---|---|---|---|
| 2000 | 6,251 | | — |
| 2010 | 6,221 | | −0.5% |
| 2020 | 6,767 | | 8.8% |
U.S. Decennial Census; 1990 2000 2010 2020

Hobart first appeared as a census designated place in the 2000 U.S. census formed out of the portion of the deleted Maple Valley CDP that was not incorporated.

=== Racial and ethnic composition ===
Hobart CDP, Washington – Racial and ethnic composition Note: the US Census treats Hispanic/Latino as an ethnic category. This table excludes Latinos from the racial categories and assigns them to a separate category. Hispanics/Latinos may be of any race.
| Race / Ethnicity (NH = Non-Hispanic) | Pop 2000 | Pop 2010 | Pop 2020 | % 2000 | % 2010 | % 2020 |
|---|---|---|---|---|---|---|
| White alone (NH) | 5,871 | 5,581 | 5,513 | 93.92% | 89.71% | 81.47% |
| Black or African American alone (NH) | 51 | 72 | 73 | 0.82% | 1.16% | 1.08% |
| Native American or Alaska Native alone (NH) | 41 | 34 | 28 | 0.66% | 0.55% | 0.41% |
| Asian alone (NH) | 57 | 126 | 216 | 0.91% | 2.03% | 3.19% |
| Native Hawaiian or Pacific Islander alone (NH) | 6 | 4 | 7 | 0.10% | 0.06% | 0.10% |
| Other race alone (NH) | 12 | 15 | 29 | 0.19% | 0.24% | 0.43% |
| Mixed race or Multiracial (NH) | 112 | 157 | 518 | 1.79% | 2.52% | 7.65% |
| Hispanic or Latino (any race) | 101 | 232 | 383 | 1.62% | 3.73% | 5.66% |
| Total | 6,251 | 6,221 | 6,767 | 100.00% | 100.00% | 100.00% |

=== 2020 census ===
As of the census of 2020, there were 6,767 people, 2,531 households.

=== 2010 census ===
As of the census of 2010, there were 6,221 people.

=== 2000 census ===
As of the census of 2000, there were 6,251 people, 2,200 households, and 1,766 families residing in the CDP. The population density was 335.0 people per square mile (129.3/km^{2}). There were 2,263 housing units at an average density of 121.3/sq mi (46.8/km^{2}). The racial makeup of the CDP was 95.10% White, 0.82% African American, 0.67% Native American, 0.91% Asian, 0.13% Pacific Islander, 0.40% from other races, and 1.97% from two or more races. Hispanic or Latino of any race were 1.62% of the population.

There were 2,200 households, out of which 37.5% had children under the age of 18 living with them, 71.3% were married couples living together, 4.9% had a female householder with no husband present, and 19.7% were non-families. 14.7% of all households were made up of individuals, and 4.4% had someone living alone who was 65 years of age or older. The average household size was 2.84 and the average family size was 3.15.

In the CDP the population was spread out, with 27.2% under the age of 18, 6.2% from 18 to 24, 28.1% from 25 to 44, 30.4% from 45 to 64, and 8.1% who were 65 years of age or older. The median age was 40 years. For every 100 females there were 105.3 males. For every 100 females age 18 and over, there were 105.6 males.

The median income for a household in the CDP was $75,334, and the median income for a family was $80,127. Males had a median income of $53,942 versus $40,433 for females. The per capita income for the CDP was $32,067. About 1.4% of families and 2.3% of the population were below the poverty line, including 0.8% of those under age 18 and 4.9% of those age 65 or over.

== Education ==
Most of the Hobart area is in the Tahoma School District, while a portion is in the Issaquah School District.
