= Cedar River Trail =

Hiking trail in Washington state, USA

Coordinates: 47°28′49″N 122°11′57″W

- Location: Washington, United States
- Use: hiking, cycling, horse riding
- Right of way: Milwaukee Road

Trail map
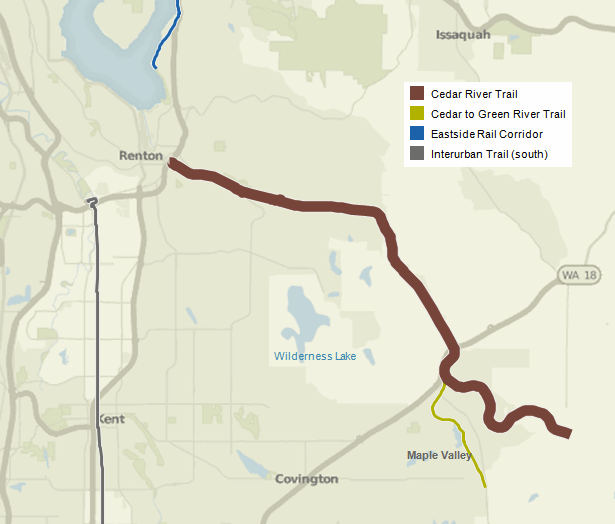

The Cedar River Regional Trail is a partially paved 17.3-mile (27.8 km) rail trail in Washington. The Cedar River Trail was the former mainline of the Milwaukee Road.

It is open for non-motorized use and parallels State Route 169 for much of its length. It connects Renton to Maple Valley. In Maple Valley it connects to the Cedar to Green River Trail at mile 12.3. Beyond Maple Valley the surface is crushed gravel, and the trail ends in Landsburg near a small dam and the boundary of the Cedar River Watershed.

A bridge on the trail parallel to State Route 169 in Maple Valley recently underwent a renovation, and is now re-opened to foot, bike, and equestrian traffic.
