= Sheridan, Washington =

Ghost town in Washington (state)

- Ghost town
- Country: United States
- State: Washington
- County: King
- Time zone: UTC-8 (Pacific (PST))
  - Summer (DST): UTC-7 (PDT)

Sheridan was a small town in southeast King County (Washington). Some amount of silver mining went on in Sheridan in the 1890s. There was a post office in Sheridan from 1892 to 1895. In addition, there was a hotel, store and a mill.

== Geography ==
Sheridan was located near present-day Maple Valley, Washington.

== History ==
Suquamish tribe chairperson Martha George "was born in Sheridan ... on April 28, 1892, at a logging camp where her mother and grandmother worked as cooks."

== See also ==
- List of ghost towns in Washington
