= Gaffney's Lake Wilderness Lodge =

- U.S. National Register of Historic Places
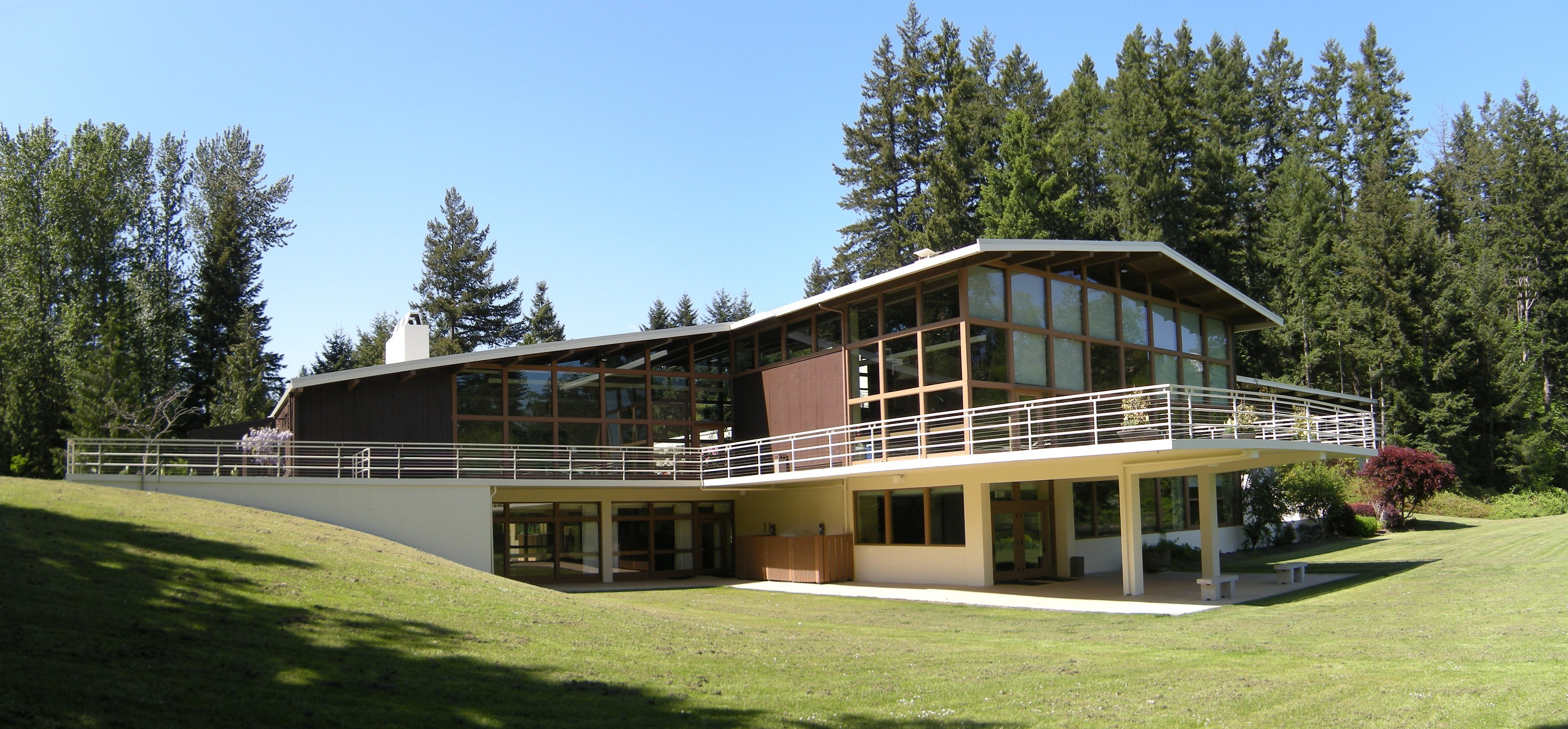
- Panoramic view of Lake Wilderness Lodge

- Location within Washington (state)
- Location: 22500 SE 248th St., Maple Valley, Washington
- Coordinates: 47°22′45″N 122°02′14″W
- Area: 1.1 acres (0.45 ha)
- Built: 1950
- Built by: Veale Construction Company
- Architect: Young, Richardson, Carleton & Detlie
- Architectural style: Modern Movement, Pacific Northwest Regional
- NRHP reference No.: 03000163
- Added to NRHP: March 28, 2003

Gaffney's Lake Wilderness Lodge is a building on Lake Wilderness in Maple Valley, Washington. The lodge was built in 1950 and added to the National Register of Historic Places in 2003. Originally built for a destination resort on the lake, the lodge is currently operated by the City of Maple Valley.

== History ==
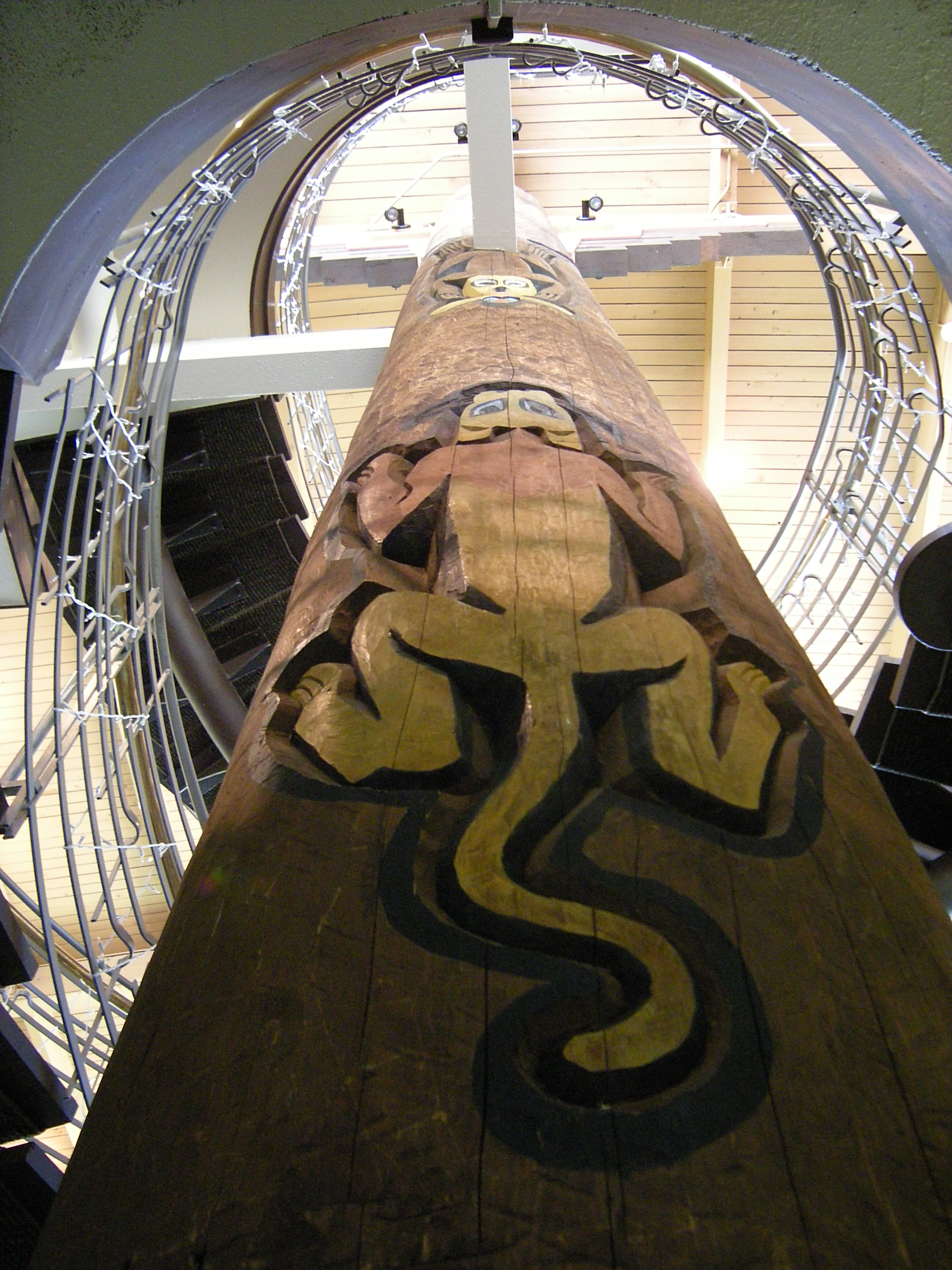
Image of Thunderbird carving

In the early 1900s, a homesteader whose property was on the shore of Lake Wilderness offered a few rental cabins on his farm to fishermen and hunters. The Gaffney brothers, Tom and Kane, bought the land and began developing a resort in 1926. They later bought two adjacent resort properties and combined them into a complex of about sixty rental cabins that offered indoor and outdoor recreation, including boat rentals, a golf course, a bowling alley, a dance hall, a roller rink, and a restaurant. The resort was a popular destination for locals and visitors during World War II.

As part of their modernization effort after the war ended, the Gaffneys hired the architecture firm of Young, Richardson, Carleton & Detlie to design the new lodge. The architecture firm won its first honor award from the American Institute of Architects in 1952 for Gaffney's Lake Wilderness Lodge.

The lodge is a 3-story wood-frame structure, clad in white cement stucco. The walls are primarily glass panes framed in fir. The architects designed the lodge to be viewed from the lake and entry sides. A long canopy provides shelter for arriving guests on the entry side. Natural fir is used extensively inside through support columns and exposed beams. The north wing contains 10 guest rooms with small balconies and private bathrooms. The lodge is wrapped by a concrete deck on the lakeside, supported by two rows of concrete columns and concrete beams.

The lodge contains a 33-foot Thunderbird sculpture, carved from a 7 1/2-foot diameter cedar log by Dudley C. Carter. A free-standing staircase spirals around the sculpture which serves as the mezzanine centerpiece.

The Gaffneys added a 2,400-foot airstrip to encourage visitors to take air taxis to the resort. In 1952, the air taxi fee from Bellevue Airfield was $10 for one person.

King County, Washington purchased the lake property in 1966 and leased it as a convention center. In 2003, the property was transferred to the City of Maple Valley.
