= Omare Lowe =

American football player (born 1978)

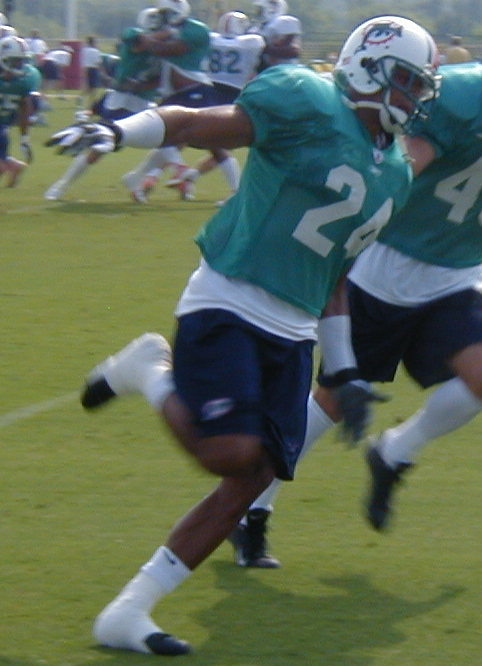
- Lowe with the Miami Dolphins in 2002

No. 24, 26, 23, 21
- Position: Cornerback

Personal information
- Born: April 20, 1978 (age 48); Maple Valley, Washington, U.S.
- Listed height: 6 ft 1 in (1.85 m)
- Listed weight: 195 lb (88 kg)

Career information
- High school: Tahoma (Maple Valley)
- College: Washington
- NFL draft: 2002: 5th round, 161st overall pick

Career history
- Miami Dolphins (2002); Tennessee Titans (2003)*; New York Jets (2003); Minnesota Vikings (2004); Washington Redskins (2004)*; New England Patriots (2004); Seattle Seahawks (2005)*; Atlanta Falcons (2005–2007); Seattle Seahawks (2008)*; Jacksonville Jaguars (2008)
- * Offseason or practice squad member only

Awards and highlights
- Super Bowl champion (XXXIX)

Career NFL statistics
- Total tackles: 50
- Forced fumbles: 1
- Fumble recoveries: 1
- Pass deflections: 1
- Stats at Pro Football Reference

Omare Gerald Lowe (born April 20, 1978) is an American former professional football player who was a cornerback in the National Football League (NFL). He was selected by the Miami Dolphins in the fifth round of the 2002 NFL draft. He played college football for the Washington Huskies.

Lowe was also a member of the Tennessee Titans, New York Jets, Minnesota Vikings, Washington Redskins, New England Patriots, Seattle Seahawks and Atlanta Falcons.

== Early life ==
Lowe attended Tahoma High School in Maple Valley, Washington where he lettered in basketball, track, and football. Lowe was a state champion in both 110hh and 300 hurdles and was a member of the state champion 1,600-meter relay team at the 1997 state high school track championships as a senior. Lowe was an option quarterback in high school where he rushed for over 900 yards and 15 scores and played defense in one game.

== College career ==
Recruited by the University of Washington, Lowe was Redshirted the entire 1997 season. In 1998, he played in nine games recording ten tackles, three pass deflections, one forced fumble, and one interception. For the 1999 season Lowe was a backup cornerback and recorded 20 tackles, three pass deflections, and one interception. Lowe's best season would be in 2000 when he started in every game as the strong side cornerback and recorded 30 tackles, two interceptions, and nine pass deflections. Lowe's last season as a Husky was a great one when he recorded 40 tackles, two interceptions (one for a touchdown), and nine pass deflections.

== Professional career ==
=== Miami Dolphins ===
Lowe was originally selected by the Miami Dolphins in the fifth round of the 2002 NFL draft, but would only play in one game. On September 1, 2003, he was released by the Dolphins.

=== Tennessee Titans ===
He was signed to the Tennessee Titans practice squad on September 3, 2003, and released September 22, 2003.

=== New York Jets ===
He signed to New York Jets practice squad in October and signed to their active roster in November and finished the season with them.

=== Minnesota Vikings ===
Lowe started the 2004 season on the Minnesota Vikings roster but was released after the first game.

=== Washington Redskins ===
Lowe spent two days on the practice squad of the Washington Redskins before being released on November 11, 2004.

=== New England Patriots ===
The New England Patriots signed Lowe to their practice squad on November 17, 2004. He was released on November 30 but re-signed December 1.

=== Seattle Seahawks (first stint) ===
Lowe signed with the Seattle Seahawks in 2005 but was released prior to the regular season.

=== Atlanta Falcons ===
The Atlanta Falcons claimed Lowe off waivers on September 4, 2005, where he remained mainly as a special teams player and led the team with 16 special team tackles and had 4 tackles on defense. His first career start was against the Carolina Panthers in place of an injured player. Atlanta re-signed Lowe on March 13, 2006. He spent all of 2007 on injured reserve before being a free agent.

=== Seattle Seahawks (second stint) ===
On April 7, 2008, Lowe signed a one-year, $605,000 contract with the Seahawks, re-joining the team after three seasons with the Falcons. The move also re-united Lowe with Seahawks assistant head coach Jim L. Mora, who was the Falcons' head coach when the team signed Lowe in 2005.

=== Jacksonville Jaguars ===
Lowe was signed by the Jacksonville Jaguars on September 24, 2008, after cornerback Scott Starks was placed on injured reserve.
