= Lake Wilderness =

- Location within Washington (state)
- Location: King County, Washington
- Coordinates: 47°22′28.7″N 122°2′8.2″W
- Type: lake
- Basin countries: United States
- Surface elevation: 469 ft (143 m)

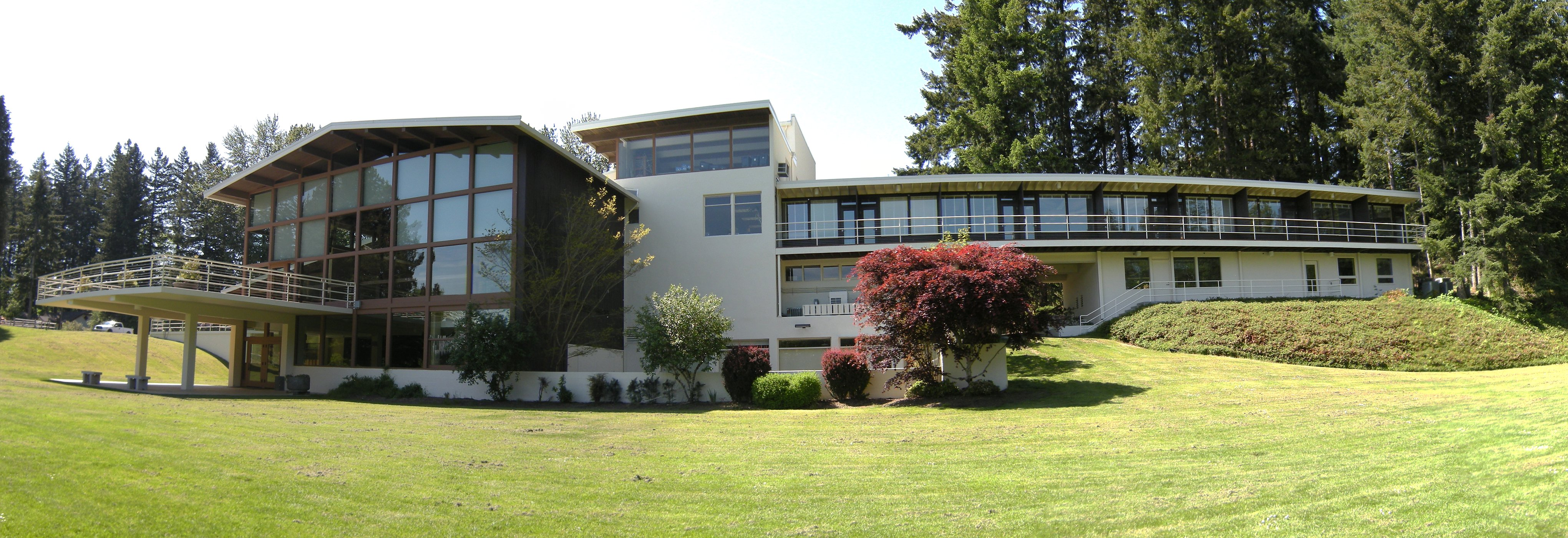
Lake Wilderness Lodge

Lake Wilderness is the largest lake in Maple Valley, Washington, United States. The Lake Wilderness Lodge, a former resort hotel, is now a King County landmark, and its grounds are a park. Lake Wilderness is surrounded by houses, forest, and a park. The park is open and free of charge, containing a playground, baseball field, and tennis court. Every year on Maple Valley Days in June, celebrations are held in the park and the parking lot is occupied by temporary carnival rides. The lake has a beach open to year-round swimming.
