= Maple Valley, Washington =

City in Washington, United States

- City
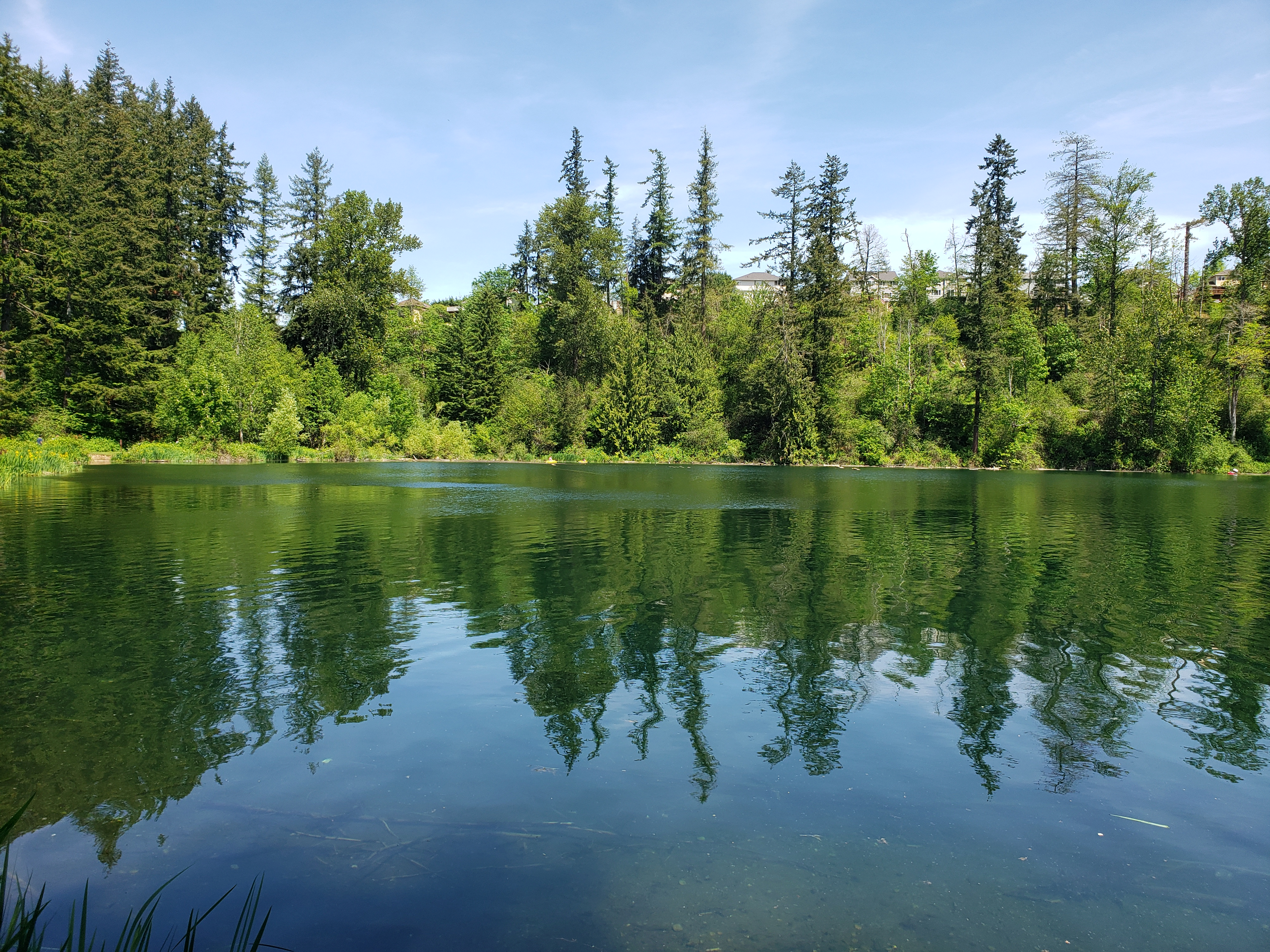
- Lake Wilderness in Maple Valley

- Location of Maple Valley, Washington
- Coordinates: 47.367147°N 122.034815°W
- Country: United States
- State: Washington
- County: King
- Settled: 1879
- Incorporated: August 31, 1997

Government
  - Type: Council–manager
  - Mayor: Sean P. Kelly
  - Deputy mayor: Dana Parnello
  - City Council: Didem Pierson; Les Burberry; Victoria Schroff; Syd Dawson; John Herbert

Area
  - Total: 6.19 sq mi (16.02 km^{2})
  - Land: 6.00 sq mi (15.55 km^{2})
  - Water: 0.18 sq mi (0.47 km^{2}) 3.0%
- Elevation: 499 ft (152 m)

Population (2020)
  - Total: 28,013
  - Estimate (2024): 28,553
  - Density: 4,760/sq mi (1,836/km^{2})
- Time zone: UTC–8 (Pacific (PST))
  - Summer (DST): UTC–7 (PDT)
- ZIP Code: 98038
- Area code: 425
- FIPS code: 53-43150
- GNIS feature ID: 2411028
- Website: maplevalleywa.gov

Maple Valley is a city in King County, Washington, United States. The population was 28,013 at the 2020 census, and was estimated to be 28,553 in 2024. The city functions as a commuter town to Seattle for residents, though there is an increasing amount of commercial activity in the area.

== History ==
The area was settled in 1879 by three men who were improving a trail and brought their families in. When a name for a future community was proposed, the names Vine Maple Valley and Maple Ridge were suggested. A vote was taken by writing the names on slips of paper and placing them in a hat. Vine Maple Valley won by 2/3, but the word "Vine" was later cut by the post office because it made the name too long.

The town's early history mainly had to do with coal, lumber milling to build homes, and a railroad that ran through town. Coal was brought in from Black Diamond to the south, but the town itself also mined coal from Cedar Mountain. The mine was used as late as 1947. Rail workers for lines like the Northern Pacific Railroad and the Cedar River Watershed, closed off by the City of Seattle, meant more workers for those things. More residents meant more lumber milling. More lumber milling meant more workers. Suquamish tribe chairperson Martha George was born near Maple Valley in Sheridan in 1892, at a logging camp where her mother and grandmother worked as cooks.

The town grew inward. Blacksmith shops, hotels, saloons and stores took up the town in the 1910s and 1920s. Schools went up as well. Early schools were shacks at best. A two-room school went up in 1910, and a larger high school was built in 1929 as the first school in the Tahoma School District. The school, after extensive renovations, still stands today as an elementary school. Much of this early development actually did not take place in the modern-day city, but rather in Hobart, northeast of incorporated Maple Valley.

More residents meant farming and fishing became staples in the area, with milk, poultry and berry farming becoming the main grown food staples in the area. Fishing out of the Cedar River also became popular. Maple Valley also saw resorts beginning in the 1920s. Lake Wilderness, once the site of a county lumber mill, quickly became a resort lake with the opening of Gaffney's Grove, which opened with a ballroom, restaurant and roller rink. Later, the resort grew to include an airstrip, lodge, rental cabins, a nine-hole golf course and a bowling alley. It remained in operation until 1964.

Increasing automobile use in the area gave rise to new roads being built. In the early 1960s, the construction of State Route 18 between Auburn and North Bend ran through the city, requiring many landmarks to be either demolished or moved. The Maple Valley Historical Society keeps records on the city's past, with two historical museums holding artifacts such as the city's first fire engine and photographs of old places in and around the city like Gaffney's Grove.

=== Incorporation and recent development ===
The city of Maple Valley was officially incorporated on August 31, 1997. The Green to Cedar River trail runs through the city, along SR 169 and Witte Road while passing through the former Gaffney's Grove site, now the Lake Wilderness City Park. The park includes a swimming beach and sprawling grass fields, and sees the annual Maple Valley Days Parade each year in June. The Lake Wilderness Arboretum is also located here.

Due to the urban growth boundaries of King County, the city is uniquely split into different sectors along Maple Valley Black Diamond Road (SR 169), the main thoroughfare through the city. At the northern and southern boundaries of the city lie two large commercial areas, while central Maple Valley is predominantly residential.

The south side's Four Corners district is the main commercial area of the city. It is located along Maple Valley Black Diamond Road and is bisected by Kent Kangley Road (SR 516) to create four distinct areas of development. The northwestern corner underwent massive reconstruction in the early 2010s and now features several large retailers, apartments, and a strip mall. The northeastern corner was completely constructed in the 2010s; it formerly was a large lumberyard and is now home to several retailers. The southern corners feature strip malls, retailers, an apartment complex, and a housing development.

== Geography ==
According to the United States Census Bureau, the city has a total area of 6.18 square miles (16.01 km^{2}), of which, 6.00 square miles (15.54 km^{2}) is land and 0.18 square miles (0.47 km^{2}) (3.0%) is water. The main bodies of water in the city limits are Lake Wilderness, Lake Lucerne, Rock Creek, and part of Pipe Lake. The Cedar River passes through unincorporated King County very near the northeastern border of the city. The city is bordered by Hobart, Fairwood, and Ravensdale, two unincorporated King County census-designated places, along with the cities of Covington, Renton, Kent, and Black Diamond.

== Climate ==
Maple Valley's climate is classified under the Köppen system as mediterranean or maritime. It generally has cooler nights and more precipitation than Seattle year round. Winter days are also slightly colder than areas closer to downtown Seattle.

Climate data for Landsburg, Washington, (1991–2020 normals, extremes 1915–present)
Month	Jan	Feb	Mar	Apr	May	Jun	Jul	Aug	Sep	Oct	Nov	Dec	Year
Record high °F (°C)	68 (20)	74 (23)	84 (29)	89 (32)	102 (39)	112 (44)	101 (38)	102 (39)	97 (36)	88 (31)	76 (24)	72 (22)	112 (44)
Mean maximum °F (°C)	55.9 (13.3)	58.9 (14.9)	66.8 (19.3)	75.3 (24.1)	83.8 (28.8)	86.8 (30.4)	92.1 (33.4)	90.9 (32.7)	84.8 (29.3)	72.1 (22.3)	59.6 (15.3)	53.8 (12.1)	95.3 (35.2)
Mean daily maximum °F (°C)	45.7 (7.6)	48.9 (9.4)	53.3 (11.8)	58.6 (14.8)	65.9 (18.8)	70.3 (21.3)	77.0 (25.0)	77.3 (25.2)	70.6 (21.4)	59.5 (15.3)	49.9 (9.9)	44.5 (6.9)	60.1 (15.6)
Daily mean °F (°C)	39.3 (4.1)	40.9 (4.9)	44.0 (6.7)	48.5 (9.2)	54.9 (12.7)	59.2 (15.1)	64.2 (17.9)	64.4 (18.0)	58.8 (14.9)	50.3 (10.2)	42.8 (6.0)	38.4 (3.6)	50.5 (10.3)
Mean daily minimum °F (°C)	33.0 (0.6)	32.8 (0.4)	34.7 (1.5)	38.5 (3.6)	43.9 (6.6)	48.2 (9.0)	51.4 (10.8)	51.5 (10.8)	46.9 (8.3)	41.2 (5.1)	35.7 (2.1)	32.3 (0.2)	40.8 (4.9)
Mean minimum °F (°C)	22.1 (−5.5)	22.7 (−5.2)	25.7 (−3.5)	29.3 (−1.5)	34.1 (1.2)	39.9 (4.4)	43.0 (6.1)	43.0 (6.1)	37.9 (3.3)	29.8 (−1.2)	24.7 (−4.1)	20.8 (−6.2)	17.0 (−8.3)
Record low °F (°C)	1 (−17)	0 (−18)	12 (−11)	23 (−5)	25 (−4)	31 (−1)	33 (1)	29 (−2)	28 (−2)	17 (−8)	4 (−16)	0 (−18)	0 (−18)
Average precipitation inches (mm)	7.99 (203)	5.44 (138)	6.19 (157)	5.55 (141)	3.87 (98)	3.15 (80)	1.29 (33)	1.64 (42)	2.83 (72)	5.76 (146)	8.51 (216)	7.46 (189)	59.68 (1,515)
Average precipitation days (≥ 0.01 inch)	19.9	17.5	20.1	18.6	15.0	12.4	6.8	6.6	10.0	16.9	21.0	20.8	185.6
Source 1: NOAA
Source 2: National Weather Service

== Demographics ==
Historical population
Census	Pop.	Note	%±
1990	1,211		—
2000	14,209		1,073.3%
2010	22,684		59.6%
2020	28,013		23.5%
2024 (est.)	28,553		1.9%
U.S. Decennial Census; 1970 1980 1990; 2000 2010 2020

Based on per capita income, one of the more reliable measures of affluence, Maple Valley ranks 93rd of 522 areas in the state of Washington to be ranked.

The city is one of the fastest growing market areas in Washington State. From 2000 – 2010 the City grew nearly 63% - the 17th fastest growing city in the State during that period. The city currently ranks #41 out of 281 municipalities in the State for population, and has an estimated trade area population of 65,000-94,000.

A high percentage of residents are college educated, approximately 75% of adults have post-secondary education. In addition, the median income in Maple Valley is $117,706 per household. High household earnings and comparatively low cost of housing provide Maple Valley residents, on average, with more disposable income.

According to realtor website Zillow, the average price of a home as of May 31, 2025, in Maple Valley is $820,893.

As of the 2023 American Community Survey, there are 9,300 estimated households in Maple Valley with an average of 3.02 persons per household. The city has a median household income of $147,546. Approximately 5.1% of the city's population lives at or below the poverty line. Maple Valley has an estimated 69.9% employment rate, with 47.5% of the population holding a bachelor's degree or higher and 96.7% holding a high school diploma.

The top five reported ancestries (people were allowed to report up to two ancestries, thus the figures will generally add to more than 100%) were English (83.0%), Spanish (1.3%), Indo-European (7.3%), Asian and Pacific Islander (7.9%), and Other (0.6%).

The median age in the city was 36.5 years.

Maple Valley first appeared as a census designated place in the 1990 U.S. census. Prior to the 2000 U.S. census it was deleted with part used to form the Lake Morton-Berrydale CDP and the remainder annexed to the cities of Black Diamond, Washington, and Maple Valley.

=== Racial and ethnic composition ===
Maple Valley, Washington – racial and ethnic composition Note: the US Census treats Hispanic/Latino as an ethnic category. This table excludes Latinos from the racial categories and assigns them to a separate category. Hispanics/Latinos may be of any race.
Race / ethnicity (NH = non-Hispanic)	Pop. 1990	Pop. 2000	Pop. 2010	Pop. 2020	% 1990	% 2000	% 2010	% 2020
White alone (NH)	1,154	12,625	18,745	19,818	95.29%	88.85%	82.64%	70.75%
Black or African American alone (NH)	7	143	453	741	0.58%	1.01%	2.00%	2.65%
Native American or Alaska Native alone (NH)	6	88	105	125	0.50%	0.62%	0.46%	0.45%
Asian alone (NH)	21	345	995	2,469	1.73%	2.43%	4.39%	8.81%
Pacific Islander alone (NH)	—	22	90	79	—	0.15%	0.40%	0.28%
Other race alone (NH)	0	27	36	117	0.00%	0.19%	0.16%	0.42%
Mixed race or multiracial (NH)	—	453	967	2,418	—	3.19%	4.26%	8.63%
Hispanic or Latino (any race)	23	506	1,293	2,246	1.90%	3.56%	5.70%	8.02%
Total	1,211	14,209	22,684	28,013	100.00%	100.00%	100.00%	100.00%

=== 2020 census ===
As of the 2020 census, Maple Valley had a population of 28,013, with 9,218 households and 7,421 families residing in the city.

The population density was 4,665.72 inhabitants per square mile (1,801.4/km^{2}), and there were 9,435 housing units at an average density of 1,571.45 per square mile (606.7/km^{2}); 2.3% of those units were vacant, the homeowner vacancy rate was 0.4%, and the rental vacancy rate was 4.6%.

The median age was 36.2 years, with 31.1% of residents under age 18 and 9.0% aged 65 or older; for every 100 females there were 99.5 males and 95.0 males for every 100 females age 18 and over.

Of the 9,218 households, 50.2% had children under 18, 66.1% were married-couple households, 10.8% were male householders with no spouse or partner present, 17.1% were female householders with no spouse or partner present, 14.9% were individuals living alone, and 6.1% had someone living alone who was 65 years of age or older.

All of the city's residents (100.0%) lived in urban areas, while none lived in rural areas.

Racial composition as of the 2020 census
Race	Number	Percent
White	20,353	72.7%
Black or African American	751	2.7%
American Indian and Alaska Native	159	0.6%
Asian	2,500	8.9%
Native Hawaiian and Other Pacific Islander	91	0.3%
Some other race	715	2.6%
Two or more races	3,444	12.3%

=== 2010 census ===
As of the 2010 census, there were 22,684 people, 7,679 households, and 6,159 families residing in the city. The population density was 3,965.73 inhabitants per square mile (1,531.2/km^{2}). There were 7,997 housing units at an average density of 1,398.08 per square mile (539.8/km^{2}). The racial makeup of the city was 85.81% White, 2.08% African American, 0.49% Native American, 4.47% Asian, 0.40% Pacific Islander, 1.73% from some other races and 5.03% from two or more races. Hispanic or Latino people of any race were 5.70% of the population.

There were 7,679 households, of which 49.9% had children under the age of 18 living with them, 67.1% were married couples living together, 9.2% had a female householder with no husband present, 3.9% had a male householder with no wife present, and 19.8% were non-families. 15.0% of all households were made up of individuals, and 5% had someone living alone who was 65 years of age or older. The average household size was 2.95 and the average family size was 3.30.

The median age in the city was 34.2 years. 32.3% of residents were under the age of 18; 5.9% were between the ages of 18 and 24; 31.8% were from 25 to 44; 23.3% were from 45 to 64; and 6.6% were 65 years of age or older. The gender makeup of the city was 49.4% male and 50.6% female.

=== 2000 census ===
As of the 2000 census, there were 14,209 people, 4,809 households, and 3,952 families residing in the city. The population density was 2,617.92 inhabitants per square mile (1,010.8/km^{2}). There were 4,922 housing units at an average density of 906.85 per square mile (350.1/km^{2}). The racial makeup of the city was 90.62% White, 1.11% African American, 0.66% Native American, 2.46% Asian, 0.15% Pacific Islander, 1.36% from some other races and 3.64% from two or more races. Hispanic or Latino people of any race were 3.56% of the population.

There were 4,809 households, out of which 51.7% had children under the age of 18 living with them, 69.9% were married couples living together, 8.9% had a female householder with no husband present, and 17.8% were non-families. 13.6% of all households were made up of individuals, and 3.2% had someone living alone who was 65 years of age or older. The average household size was 2.95 and the average family size was 3.26.

In the city, the population was spread out, with 33.8% under the age of 18, 5.4% between 19 and 24, 38.5% between 25 and 44, 17.8% between 45 and 64, and 4.5% who were 65 years of age or older. The median age was 32 years. For every 100 females, there were 99.2 males. For every 100 females age 18 and over, there were 96.5 males.

The median income for a household in the city was $67,159, and the median income for a family was $70,008. Males had a median income of $50,623 versus $34,097 for females. The per capita income for the city was $24,859. About 2.1% of families and 2.6% of the population were below the poverty line, including 2.4% of those under age 18 and 3.7% of those age 65 and over.

== Education ==
The entirety of Maple Valley is served by the Tahoma School District. There is one high school, two middle schools, and six elementary schools. The district operates its transportation facility adjacent to SR 18 on Petrovitsky near the city limits. The Central Services building is located next to Rock Creek Elementary School.

The Tahoma School District at one point had its high school in neighboring Covington. In 2015, a bond measure was passed to build a new and more centralized high school for the district. It was to be built in a small unincorporated area southeast of Four Corners that was completely surrounded by Maple Valley, known informally as the ‘Donut Hole’. The area was annexed into Maple Valley and the new three-story Tahoma High School was completed in 2017.

Most of the district's schools are located within the city, with a few exceptions:

- Tahoma High School (Maple Valley)
- Maple View Middle School (Covington)
- Summit Trail Middle School (Ravensdale)
- Glacier Park Elementary School (Maple Valley)
- Rock Creek Elementary School (Maple Valley)
- Shadow Lake Elementary School (Maple Valley)
- Cedar River Elementary School (Maple Valley)
- Lake Wilderness Elementary School (Maple Valley)
- Tahoma Elementary School (Hobart)

== Government and politics ==
Presidential election results
Year	Republican	Democratic	Third Parties
2020	40.0%	56.3%	3.7%
2016	21.1%	70.0%	8.9%
2012	28.9%	68.8%	2.3%
2008	28.2%	70.3%	1.5%
2000	34.4%	60.1%	5.5%
1996	31.4%	56.4%	2.2%

=== Maple Valley City Council ===
The City Council is made up of seven councillors elected by local residents.

According to the city's website, "the Council establishes policy direction for the City, enacts ordinances and resolutions, maintains relationships and contact in local, state, regional and national associations, and generally provides leadership for the City and direction to the City Manager."

Maple Valley City Councillors
Councillor	Position	First elected	Term expires
Sean P. Kelly (Mayor)	1	December 2011	December 2027
Didem Pierson (Deputy Mayor)	2	March 2022	December 2029
Dana Parnello	6	November 2015	December 2029
John Herbert	7	January 2024	December 2027
Les Burberry	3	November 2015	December 2027
Syd Dawson	5	May 2018	December 2027
Victoria Schroff	4	January 2022	December 2029

=== Police ===
Maple Valley is a contract city with the King County Sheriff's Office for police services. The King County deputies that are assigned to the city wear city uniforms and patches, but wear a King County Sheriff badge. The deputies mostly drive marked patrol cars with the city logo.

== Points of interest ==
- Cedar River
- Cedar River Trail
- Lake Wilderness
- Lake Wilderness Lodge
- Lake Wilderness Arboretum
- Walsh Lake

== Sports ==
Maple Valley is home to Bigfoot FC, a minor league soccer club that has a men's team in USL League Two and women's team in the USL W League. Bigfoot FC joined the United Soccer League system as an expansion team in 2025 and plays their home matches at Tahoma High School.

== Notable people ==
- Darby Allin, professional wrestler
- Nikolas Besagno, soccer player
- Brandi Carlile, singer-songwriter
- Zan Fiskum, singer and reality show competitor
- Omare Lowe, former NFL player
- Jens Pulver, UFC fighter and coach
- Richard Sherman, NFL cornerback
- Johnny Valentine, 2006 inductee in the Professional Wrestling Hall of Fame
