= Tahoma School District =

School district in Washington, United States

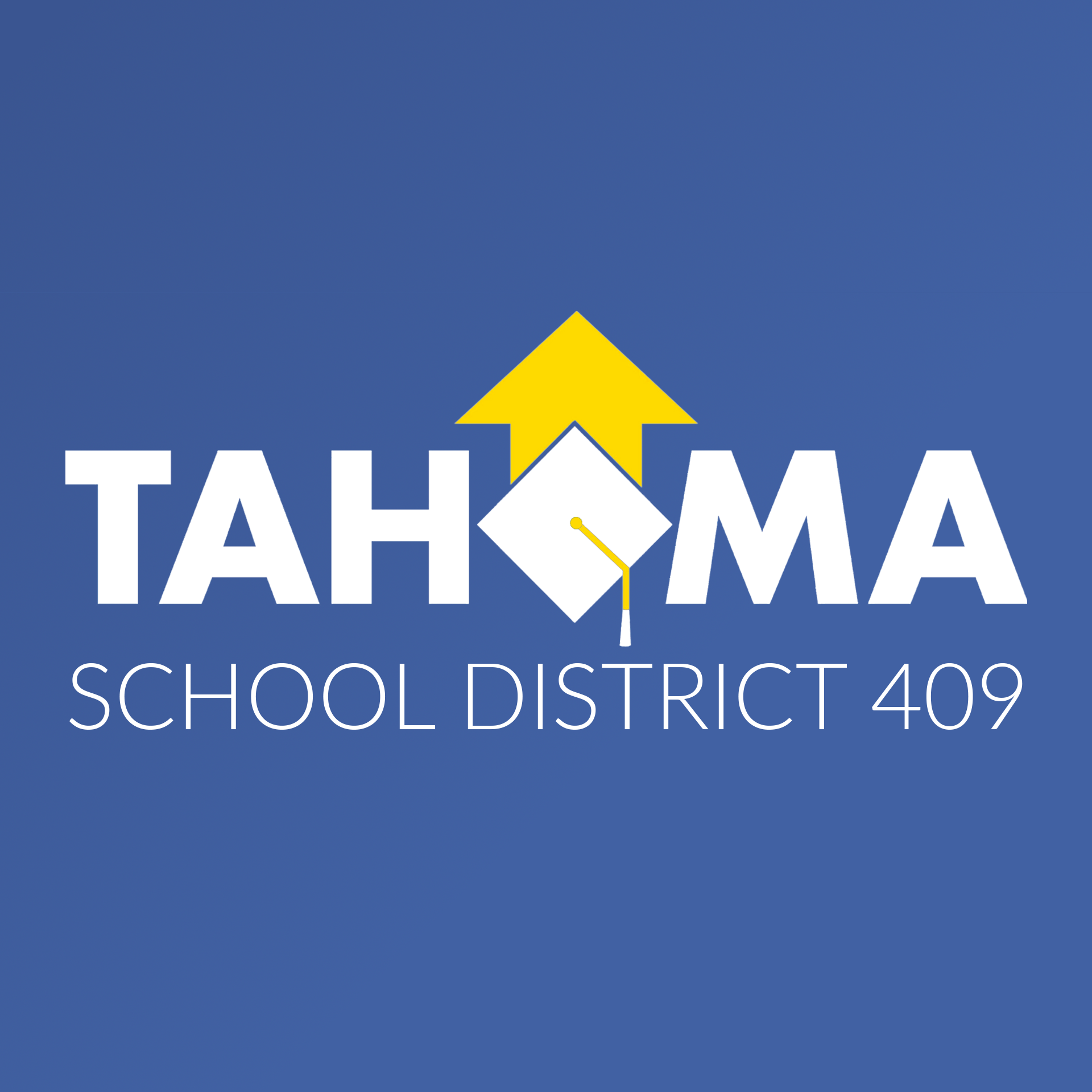

Address
- 25720 Maple Valley Black Diamond Rd SE (SR 169) Maple Valley, Washington, 98038; United States

District information
- Type: Public
- Motto: Future Ready Students
- Grades: K-12
- Established: 1926; 100 years ago
- Superintendent: Dr. Ginger Callison
- NCES District ID: 5308760

Students and staff
- Students: 9,256
- Teachers: 508
- Student–teacher ratio: 18.22

Other information
- Acronym: Tahoma CARES
- Mission Statement: Together, provide the tools and experiences every student needs to create an individual, viable and valued path to lifelong personal success.
- Website: www.tahomasd.us

Tahoma School District No. 409 (TSD) is a public school district headquartered in Maple Valley, Washington. The district provides for citizens within southeast King County, and operates 6 elementary schools, 2 middle schools, and the district's singular high school, Tahoma High School. Approximately 9,300 students are served by the district (2023–2024), which covers the entirety of Maple Valley, Ravensdale, and Hobart, portions of Renton, Covington, and Black Diamond, and a significant area of unincorporated King County. The district is bordered by Enumclaw School District to the south, Snoqualmie Valley School District to the east, Issaquah School District to the north, Renton School District to the northwest, and Kent School District to the west.

== History ==
The Tahoma School District was founded in 1927 when the Taylor, Hobart, and Maple Valley school districts agreed to merge. The school district's name is derived from the first two letters of each of the independent school districts that merged, thus Tahoma; additionally, the name was influenced by Mount Rainier which is also known as Tahoma. In 1927, the new district constructed a three-story junior-senior high school, TaHoMa High School, in Hobart. The building still stands today; it was renovated in 1977 to become just a junior high school, and in 2004 was renovated once more to become Tahoma Middle School. In 2017, it yet again was renovated and reopened as Tahoma Elementary School.

As the district grew, another secondary school became necessary due to building constraints. A building for 8th and 9th grade students was constructed and opened to 350 students in 1961, near Petrovitsky in northern Maple Valley. It would remain a secondary school until 1977, when it became an elementary school. In the years following that, the school switched between being a secondary or primary school numerous times, due to new schools being built. Throughout the 2000s, it was a middle school, since Shadow Lake Elementary School was just across the street. In 2017, it again became an elementary school, as Cedar River Elementary School.

In the late 1900s, numerous new schools were constructed. The modern-day Glacier Park Elementary School, Lake Wilderness Elementary School, Shadow Lake Elementary School, and Rock Creek Elementary School all were built then, and similar to Cedar River, shifted between grades frequently.

Enrollment continued to grow, and in 1974, a new high school was opened in the western Maple Valley area. The school was originally an open-concept design, without many interior walls separating classrooms. Within a year, the school reverted to a more traditional design, as walls were installed due to teacher dissatisfaction. In 1999, an intensive remodel of the Tahoma Senior High School building commenced, along with construction of a new junior high school, Tahoma Junior High School, for grades 8 and 9, in Ravensdale. Following voter approval of a $10 million, four-year Instructional Technology Levy in 2006, the Tahoma School District outfitted the campus with wireless internet service, Activboard digital whiteboards, and upgraded computer labs.

The building faced struggles with overcrowding throughout the 21st century as Maple Valley experienced rapid growth. The district installed 17 portable classrooms, many of which were purchased for $1 from the neighboring Kent School District. These dilapidated rooms helped to drive voters to approve a $195 million bond in 2015 to build a new high school for the community. Ground was broken that year, it was completed in 2017, and it opened for the 2017–2018 school year, returning 9th graders to the high school. The high school was completed under budget, allowing for the reconstruction of Lake Wilderness Elementary School; the once-dilapidated structure was torn down and replaced with a two-story building. The previous Senior High building was converted to Maple View Middle School, and the previous Junior High building was converted to Summit Trail Middle School.

== Schools ==
Elementary Schools (K-5)

- Glacier Park (Maple Valley)
- Rock Creek (Maple Valley)
- Lake Wilderness (Maple Valley)
- Cedar River (Maple Valley)
- Shadow Lake (Maple Valley)
- Tahoma (Hobart)

Middle Schools (6–8)

- Maple View (Covington)
- Summit Trail (Ravensdale)

High Schools (9–12)

- Tahoma (Maple Valley)

== Controversy ==
In 1986, after allegations of sexual abuse were levied against music teacher Lonnie Butz, he was suspended by the district. The teacher was very popular within the community, having recently won a 'Teacher of the Year' award from the local chamber of commerce, and the community was divided over these accusations. Facing criminal charges and a job-termination hearing, he committed suicide. Many in the community were angered at the harsh treatment given to the teacher, with at least one parent directly blaming Ed Heiser, the superintendent, for the death. Heiser himself would resign in 1993 after accusations of making inappropriate sexual remarks.

The district received further backlash in 1992 when it was uncovered that Tahoma Junior High teacher Ron Lawrence was allowed to continue teaching after admitting to previous sexual encounters with students. In 1994, a student accused Tahoma High teacher and head football coach Doug Wilson of sexual misconduct. He was placed on administrative leave, and soon resigned.

On December 9, 2016, the district did not delay or close schools during a major winter storm, opting instead to only use limited bus routes. Multiple high school students were involved in accidents on SE 240th Street, the road leading to the then-high school (now Maple View Middle School). The road was closed down by the King County Sheriff's Office, further delaying students and staff. The district apologized for the mistake and superintendent Rob Morrow took responsibility; he retired from his position the following year.

In 2017, a letter sent by Tahoma head football coach and athletic director Tony Davis to a King County judge was uncovered by parents. The letter listed donations that an alleged child molester had made to Tahoma's football program. Many parents took this as a letter of support for the child molester, and since the letter was sent with a Tahoma School District letterhead, the district was accused of also supporting this individual. Davis apologized and stated he did not condone the individual's actions in any way, while Tahoma stated that Davis's views did not reflect those of his employer and the district letterhead should not have been used. Davis was disciplined for the incident.

On September 30, 2019, Tony Giurado abruptly resigned as superintendent of the district, after serving for just over a year. A statement from the district read:

The Tahoma School District Board of Directors and Superintendent Tony Giurado have discovered that, through the fault of neither party, Mr. Giurado’s considerable high integrity, skill, knowledge, and experience are not the best match for the present needs of the District.

Former Tahoma superintendent Mike Maryanski was chosen to serve as the interim superintendent for the remainder of the school year.
