= Martha George =

Chairperson of the Suquamish tribe from the late 1920s to the early 1940s leader

Personal details
- Born: April 28, 1892 Sheridan, Washington
- Died: January 7, 1987 (aged 94)
- Spouse(s): Bennie George, of the Klallam
- Relations: Chief Seattle
- Children: 10
- Nickname: Martha Purser

Martha George (April 28, 1892 – January 7, 1987) was a native American tribal leader, repeatedly elected chairperson of the Suquamish tribe, serving from the late 1920s to the early 1940s. She was a descendant of Chief Seattle in present-day Washington state. She founded the Small Tribes Organization of Western Washington.

George was a famous basketweaver, who taught master weaver Peg Deam.

Deam recounted a story of when she was a little girl and asked George to take her to gather bark for a cedar dress. George laughed - winter is not the time for gathering - and took her in the spring.

Her collection of Coast Salish baskets is displayed in the Suquamish Museum.

== Quote ==
"They took what they needed and that's all. There's nothing wasted. That's quite important among the Indians: that you should respect the earth."

—Martha George, in the video documentary Come Forth Laughing

== See also ==
- List of Native American politicians
- Native American women in politics
