= Ravensdale, Washington =

- Census-designated place
- Location of Ravensdale, Washington
- Coordinates: 47°21′32″N 121°58′41″W
- Country: United States
- State: Washington
- County: King

Area
  - Total: 4.56 sq mi (11.82 km^{2})
  - Land: 4.45 sq mi (11.52 km^{2})
  - Water: 0.12 sq mi (0.30 km^{2})
- Elevation: 617 ft (188 m)

Population (2020)
  - Total: 555
  - Density: 247/sq mi (95.5/km^{2})
- Time zone: UTC-8 (Pacific (PST))
  - Summer (DST): UTC-7 (PDT)
- ZIP code: 98051
- Area code: 425
- FIPS code: 53-57395
- GNIS feature ID: 2409146

Ravensdale is a census-designated place (CDP) in King County, Washington, United States. The population was 555 at the 2020 census.

Based on per capita income, Ravensdale ranks 50th out of 522 areas in the state of Washington.

== History ==
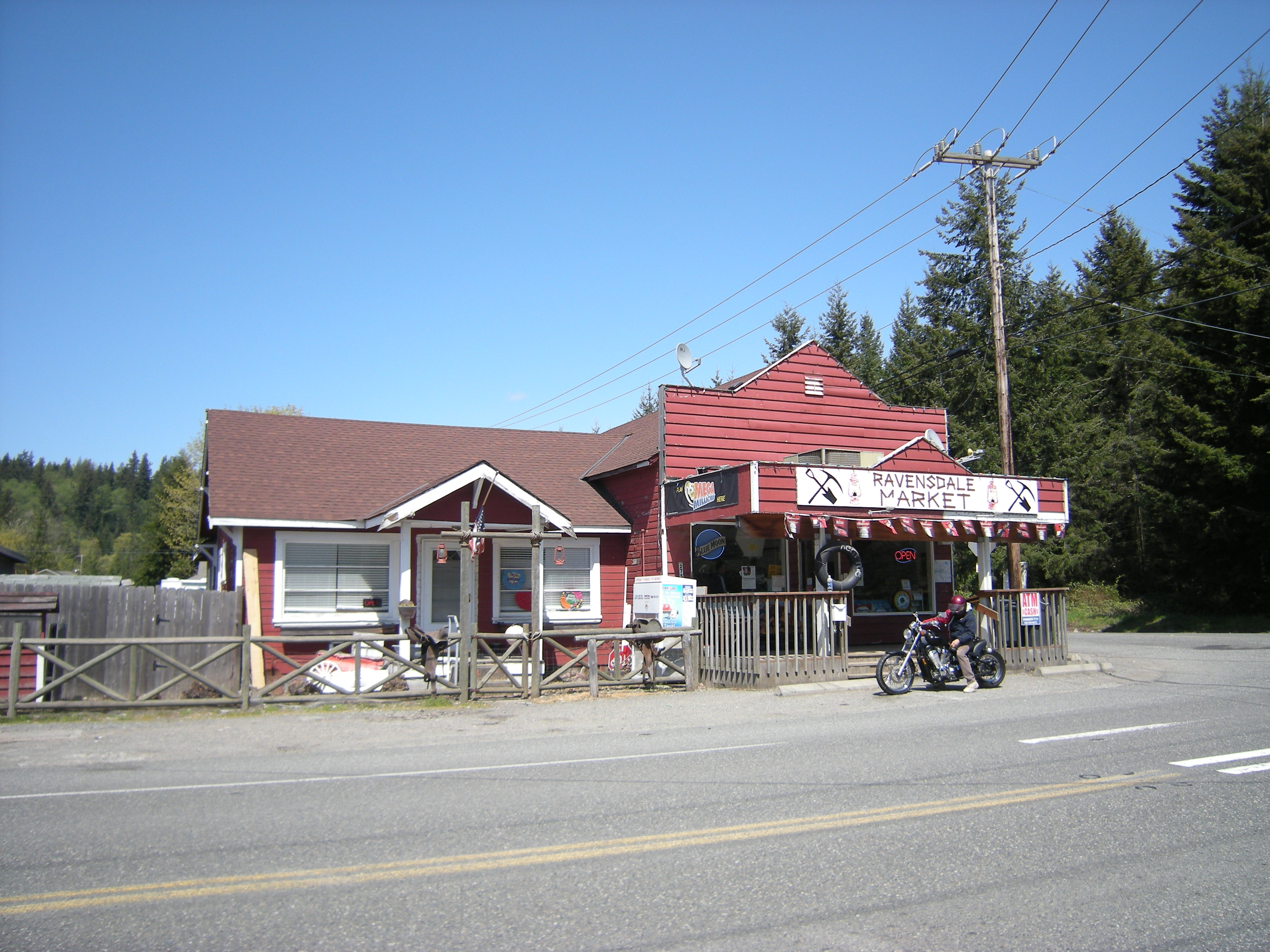
The Ravensdale Market

Ravensdale was originally called "Leary", after the Leary Coal Company, in turn, named for John Leary, a Seattle pioneer. The latter name came from the flocks of ravens that fed on grain spilled from the boxcars on the Northern Pacific Railroad tracks that ran through the town. Underground coal mining commenced around 1899 by the Seattle and San Francisco Railway and Navigation Company, although coal had been mined in nearby Danville and Landsburg a few years earlier. The coal mines were later acquired by the Northwest Improvement Company (NWI), a subsidiary of Northern Pacific. In 1907, Ravensdale was a coal mining town with a population of about 1,000 residents, most of whom worked for the mining company. Ravensdale was officially incorporated on August 15, 1913. On November 16, 1915, at 1:25 p.m. an explosion occurred at the mine, killing 31 men, one of the worst coal mining accidents in Washington state history. The NWI mine was closed permanently and many of the immigrant miners left town seeking work elsewhere. A number of coal miners from Ravensdale moved to Ray, Arizona, to mine copper. The town was disincorporated in the 1920s.

Over the decades, coal mining continued to fuel Ravensdale's economy as new mines were developed operating on the Danville, Landsburg, and McKay coal seams. The Dale Coal Company became one of the more successful from about 1924–1941, followed by the Continental Coal Company from 1942 to 1944, the Anderson Coal Company from 1943 to 1948; and Palmer Coking Coal Company from 1937 to 1975. On January 29, 1955, four miners were lost in the Landsburg mine when a cave-in filled the mine with water, mud and debris. On December 17, 1975, at 2:30 p.m., the Rogers No. 3 mine was dynamited shut by Palmer Coking Coal Company. This was the last underground coal mine in the state of Washington.

== Geography ==
Ravensdale is located in southern King County and is bordered to the west by the city of Maple Valley. Ravensdale is 28 miles (45 km) southeast of downtown Seattle and the same distance northeast of Tacoma. It is situated at an elevation of 623 feet (190 m).

According to the United States Census Bureau, the Ravensdale CDP has a total area of 4.6 square miles (11.8 km^{2}), of which 4.4 square miles (11.3 km^{2}) are land and 0.1 square miles (0.3 km^{2}), or 2.51%, are water.

=== Climate ===
The region experiences warm (but not hot) and dry summers, with no average monthly temperatures above 71.6 °F. According to the Köppen Climate Classification system, Ravensdale has a warm-summer Mediterranean climate, abbreviated "Csb" on climate maps.

== Demographics ==
Historical population
Census	Pop.	Note	%±
2000	816		—
2010	1,101		34.9%
2020	555		−49.6%
U.S. Decennial Census; 1970 1980 1990; 2000 2010 2020

Ravensdale first appeared as a census designated place in the 2000 U.S. census.

=== Racial and ethnic composition ===
Ravensdale CDP, Washington – Racial and ethnic composition Note: the US Census treats Hispanic/Latino as an ethnic category. This table excludes Latinos from the racial categories and assigns them to a separate category. Hispanics/Latinos may be of any race.
Race / Ethnicity (NH = Non-Hispanic)	Pop 2000	Pop 2010	Pop 2020	% 2000	% 2010	% 2020
White alone (NH)	779	1,018	487	95.47%	92.46%	87.75%
Black or African American alone (NH)	1	2	1	0.12%	0.18%	0.18%
Native American or Alaska Native alone (NH)	10	9	2	1.23%	0.82%	0.36%
Asian alone (NH)	1	17	11	0.12%	1.54%	1.98%
Native Hawaiian or Pacific Islander alone (NH)	0	0	0	0.00%	0.00%	0.00%
Other race alone (NH)	0	0	5	0.00%	0.00%	0.90%
Mixed race or Multiracial (NH)	15	15	31	1.84%	1.36%	5.59%
Hispanic or Latino (any race)	10	40	18	1.23%	3.63%	3.24%
Total	816	1,101	555	100.00%	100.00%	100.00%

=== 2000 census ===
As of the census of 2000, there were 816 people, 301 households, and 217 families residing in the CDP. The population density was 162.3 people per square mile (62.6/km^{2}). There were 321 housing units at an average density of 63.8/sq mi (24.6/km^{2}). The racial makeup of the CDP was 96.08% White, 0.12% African American, 1.23% Native American, 0.12% Asian, 0.25% Pacific Islander, 0.12% from other races, and 2.08% from two or more races. Hispanic or Latino of any race were 1.23% of the population.

There were 301 households, out of which 36.9% had children under the age of 18 living with them, 62.8% were married couples living together, 6.0% had a female householder with no husband present, and 27.9% were non-families. 22.3% of all households were made up of individuals, and 5.6% had someone living alone who was 65 years of age or older. The average household size was 2.71 and the average family size was 3.19.

In the CDP, the population was spread out, with 26.1% under the age of 18, 7.6% from 18 to 24, 27.1% from 25 to 44, 29.9% from 45 to 64, and 9.3% who were 65 years of age or older. The median age was 41 years. For every 100 females there were 108.2 males. For every 100 females age 18 and over, there were 110.8 males.

The median income for a household in the CDP was $44,850, and the median income for a family was $61,741. Males had a median income of $33,182 versus $30,536 for females. The per capita income for the CDP was $28,300. About 6.1% of families and 10.8% of the population were below the poverty line, including 12.7% of those under age 18 and 7.8% of those age 65 or over.

10% of Ravensdale residents aged 25 and older have a bachelor's degree.

== Infrastructure ==
=== Transport ===
Ravensdale's primary streets are the north-south Landsburg Road and east-west Kent Kangley Road, which meet at an intersection near the center of the town. To the west of Ravensdale, Washington State Route 169 runs near the town in a north-south layout.

Auburn Municipal Airport is the closest airport to Ravensdale, but being a general aviation-exclusive airport, no commercial service exists. Commercial aviation access to Ravensdale travels though Seattle–Tacoma International Airport.

=== Utilities ===
Ravensdale's electricity is supplied by Puget Sound Energy, one of the primary electric providers for the Seattle metropolitan area.

The United States Postal Service operates a Ravensdale office on 272nd Ave near Kent Kangley Road.

== Notable people ==
- Brandi Carlile, singer-songwriter

== Literature ==
- Washington Geologic Survey Bulletin No. 3 by George Watkin Evans (1912)
- Washington State Coal Mine Inspector Reports (1887–1975)
- Ravensdale Reflections by Barbara Nilson (copyright 2004)
- Washington State Place Names by James Phillips (1972)
- Voice of the Valley newspaper (December 16, 2008 page 8)
- State of Washington Fatal Accident Report for 1955 by C.R. Holmes
