= Pop Keeney Stadium =

Stadium in Bothell, Washington

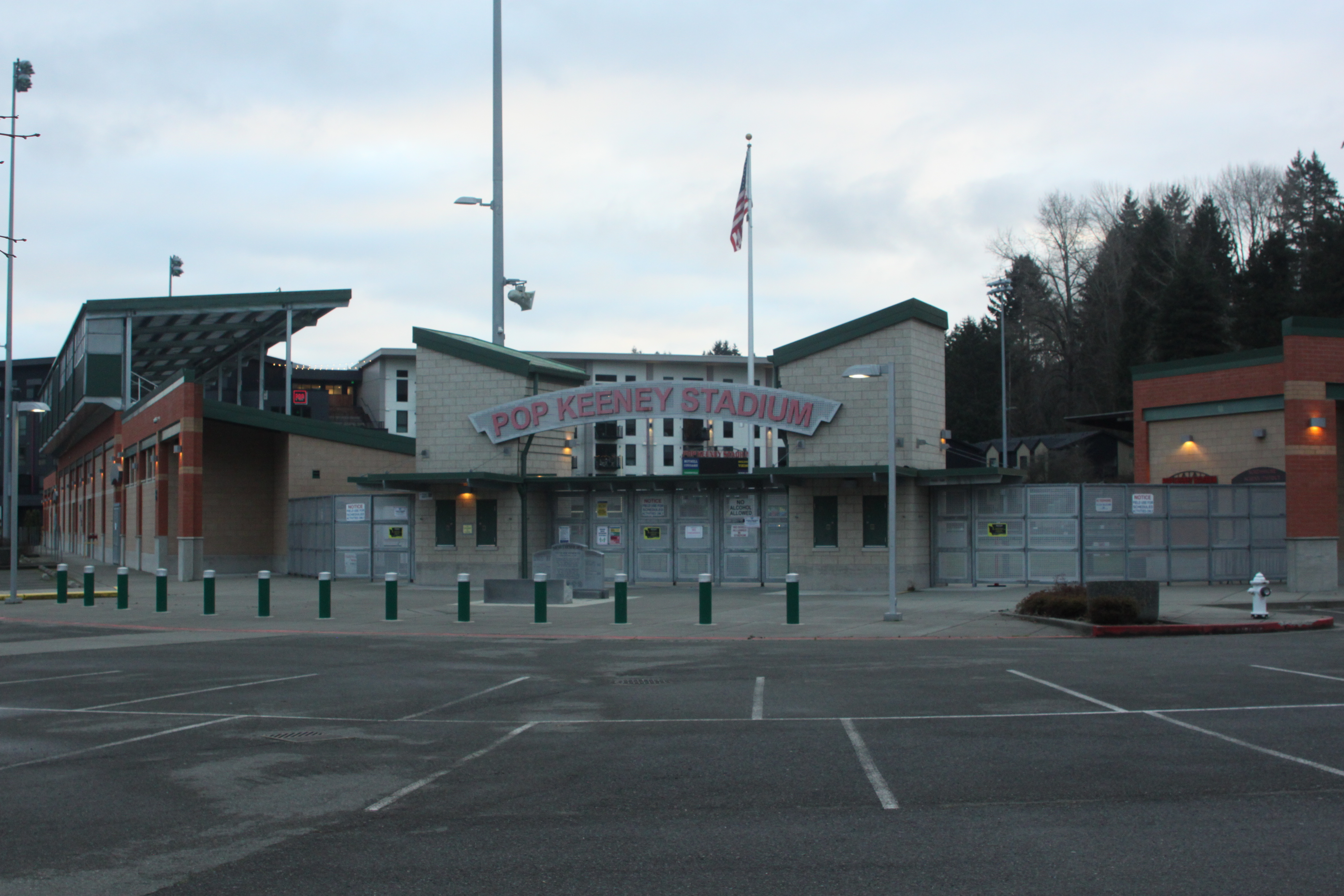
- Main entrance (NE corner) in 2022

- Location in the United States Location in Washington
- Interactive map of Pop Keeney Stadium
- Address: 18315 Bothell Way NE
- Location: Bothell, Washington, U.S.
- Coordinates: 47.7631°N 122.2112°W
- Capacity: 4,438
- Surface: Artificial turf
- Scoreboard: replay-capable
- Record attendance: 8,500

Construction
- Built: 1920
- Opened: 1953; 73 years ago
- Renovated: 2010
- Expanded: 1968 & 2010

Pop Keeney Stadium is an outdoor stadium in Bothell, Washington, a suburb northeast of Seattle. It hosts high school football games and graduation ceremonies for the four traditional high schools of the Northshore School District: Bothell, Inglemoor, North Creek, and Woodinville. Pop Keeney has also hosted both men's lacrosse games as well as state soccer playoffs for both boys and girls.

The stadium is named after Harold 'Pop' Keeney, Bothell's first football coach, and a member of one of Bothell's pioneer families.

In 2008, several Bothell high school alumni began raising money for a new replay-capable scoreboard. Donations arrived from all around the country, raising $160,000 altogether. The scoreboard was installed in 2009 as only the second of its kind in the state.

The Northshore 2010 Capital Projects Bond included a project to renovate the stadium, including updates to lighting, stands, and other facilities.

In 2016, the McMenamins restaurant/hotel/brewery complex opened in the buildings of the W. A. Anderson School next to Pop Keeney Stadium. It is now a common pre-game tailgate location for many fans attending games at the stadium.

In 2019, the Seattle Seahawks announced they would hold one special practice at Pop Keeney on August 3. The practice included performances by the Seahawks Dancers and Blue Thunder drum line as well as photo opportunities with team mascots Blitz and Boom.
