= Woodinville High School =

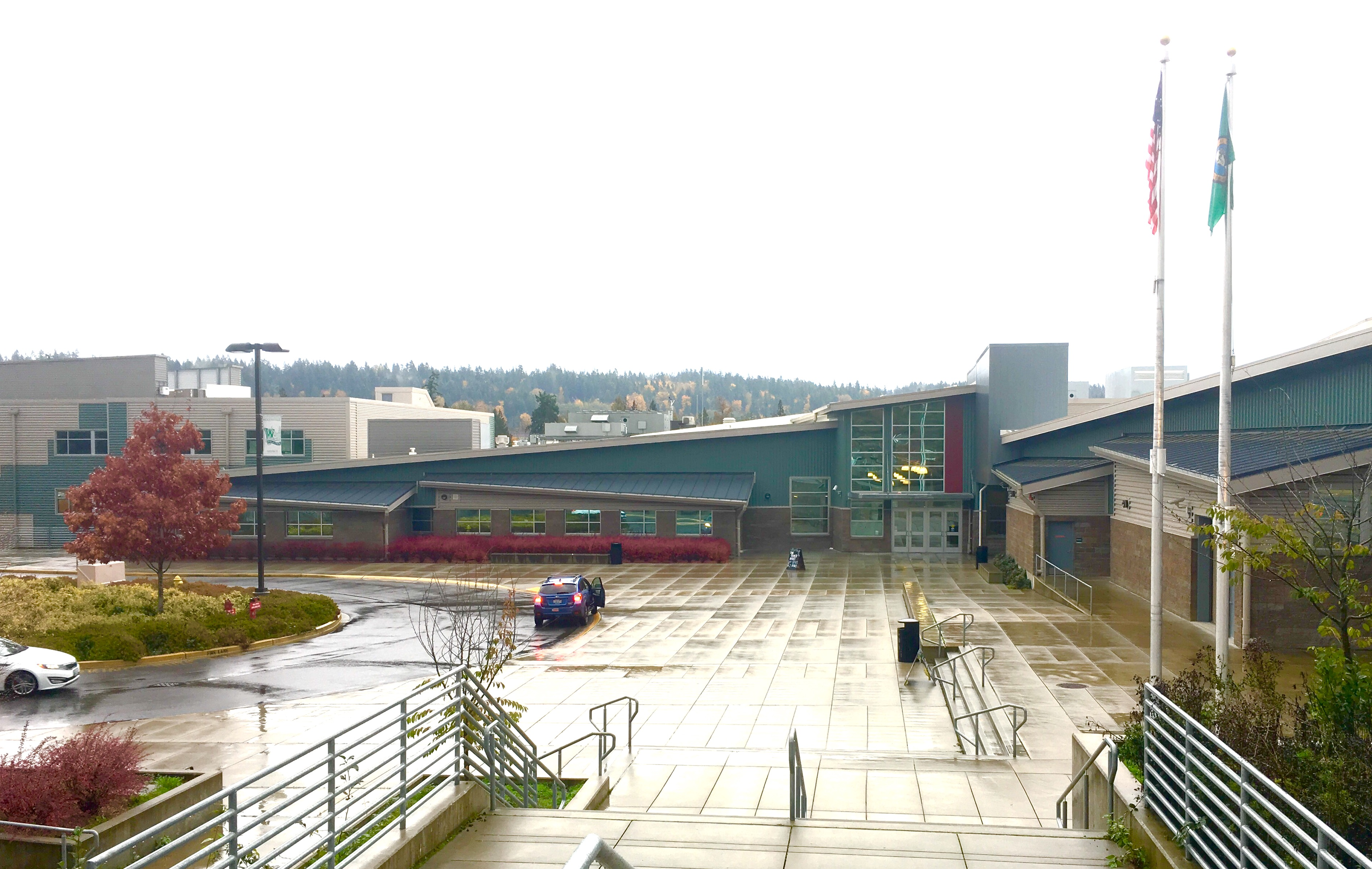
- Main Entry Plaza in 2016

Location
- 19819 136th Ave NE; Woodinville, Washington; United States; 47°46′17″N 122°09′41″W

Information
- Type: Public
- Motto: One falcon, One family
- Established: 1983; 43 years ago
- School district: Northshore S.D.
- Superintendent: Justin Irish
- Principal: Kurt Criscione
- Teaching staff: 76.13 (FTE)
- Grades: 9–12
- Enrollment: 1,662 (2024–2025)
- Student to teacher ratio: 21.83
- Colors: White and Kelly green
- Mascot: Falcon
- Website: woodinville.nsd.org

Woodinville High School is a public secondary school in the northwest United States in Woodinville, Washington, a suburb northeast of Seattle. Serving grades 9 through 12, it educates the eastern portion of the Northshore School District and is a member of the KingCo 4A athletic conference.

== Background ==
Woodinville High School opened its doors 43 years ago in 1983 on a 50-acre (0.20 km^{2}) site. A special education and administration addition in 1990 expanded the facility. From 2009 to 2012, the school underwent demolition and reconstruction for a new school building, to which a new addition includes a theater. The school theater, gym, and fields are used in the evenings and on weekends for special events.

WHS is one of four general high schools in the Northshore School District (as of 2023), along with Bothell, North Creek, and Inglemoor. The school offers a large selection of Advanced Placement (AP) classes.

Woodinville athletic teams include football, basketball (boys'/girls'), baseball, softball (fastpitch/slowpitch), soccer (boys'/girls'), track and field, cross country, tennis (boys'/girls'), girls' gymnastics, and wrestling.

The feeder middle schools to WHS are Leota and Timbercrest.

== Academics ==
WHS offers AP Classes, NEVAC classes, and WANIC (Washington Network for Innovative Careers) classes, such as Medical Professionals Academy. Languages offered are Spanish, French, American Sign Language (ASL), Japanese, and German. Art classes offered include metal design (jewelry), photography, stained glass, and ceramics. Computer classes include CAD, AP Computer Science, advanced programming topics, and computer animation. AP classes offered are: English language and composition, English literature, biology, chemistry, computer science, physics 1, physics 2, environmental science, world history, European history, art history, U.S. history, U.S. government and politics, psychology, economics (micro and macro), calculus AB, calculus BC, statistics, Spanish, French, German, Japanese, and studio art.

== Extracurricular activities ==
=== Drama program ===
The drama program has been invited twice to perform at the Edinburgh Fringe as part of the American High School Theatre Festival.

=== Music program ===
The WHS music courses include wind ensemble, symphonic band, percussion ensemble, orchestra, jazz band, guitar, choir, and piano lab. Together the wind ensemble, symphonic and percussion ensemble combine to become the marching band or pep band. The music department's largest concert is "An Evening at the Pops," held in May. Performances in this concert include those by the orchestra, band, choir, and jazz band.

The WHS choir program includes baritone, tenor, alto, and soprano parts. There is also an advanced women's choir for a full class period throughout the day, and an advanced mixed choir at the end of the day.

The high school also offers an EWI choir.

The Woodinville High School music programs were one of four high school music programs in the country to be accepted to play at the WorldStrides National Instrumental Music Festival at Carnegie Hall in New York City, NY in February 2019.

=== Athletics ===
The WHS athletic department consists of nineteen girls' and sixteen boys' team sports across three sports seasons. Home football games are played at Pop Keeney Stadium in Bothell. WHS competes in WIAA Class 4A and is a member of the Kingco Athletic Conference in District Two.

Woodinvile High School has won multiple Washington State championships:

- Baseball: 2002
- Girls’ basketball: 2022
- Fastpitch softball: 2005, 2012, 2017
- Girls’ flag football: 2025
- Girls’ gymnastics: 2007, 2008, 2009, 2010, 2014, 2015, 2016, 2017
- Girls’ soccer: 2006
- Boys’ soccer: 2025

== Notable alumni ==
- Ryan Couture, MMA fighter, class of 2000
- Andre Dillard, NFL offensive tackle, class of 2014
- Luke Houser, runner
- Clint McCune, musician
- Christian Niccum, former Olympic athlete who competed in the luge.
- Harrison Smith, The Dare, class of 2014
- Jake Snider, lead vocalist and guitarist of Minus the Bear, class of 1994
- Cooper Tomlinson, actor and social media influencer, class of 2017
- Matt Tuiasosopo, MLB, class of 2004
- Marques Tuiasosopo, NFL quarterback, Pac-10 Offensive Player of the Year (2000 season) & 2001 Rose Bowl MVP for the University of Washington Huskies football team, class of 1997
- Leslie Gabriel (Tuiasosopo), University of Washington Volleyball Coach, class of 1995
- Duke Welker, MLB, class of 2004
