= Inglemoor High School =

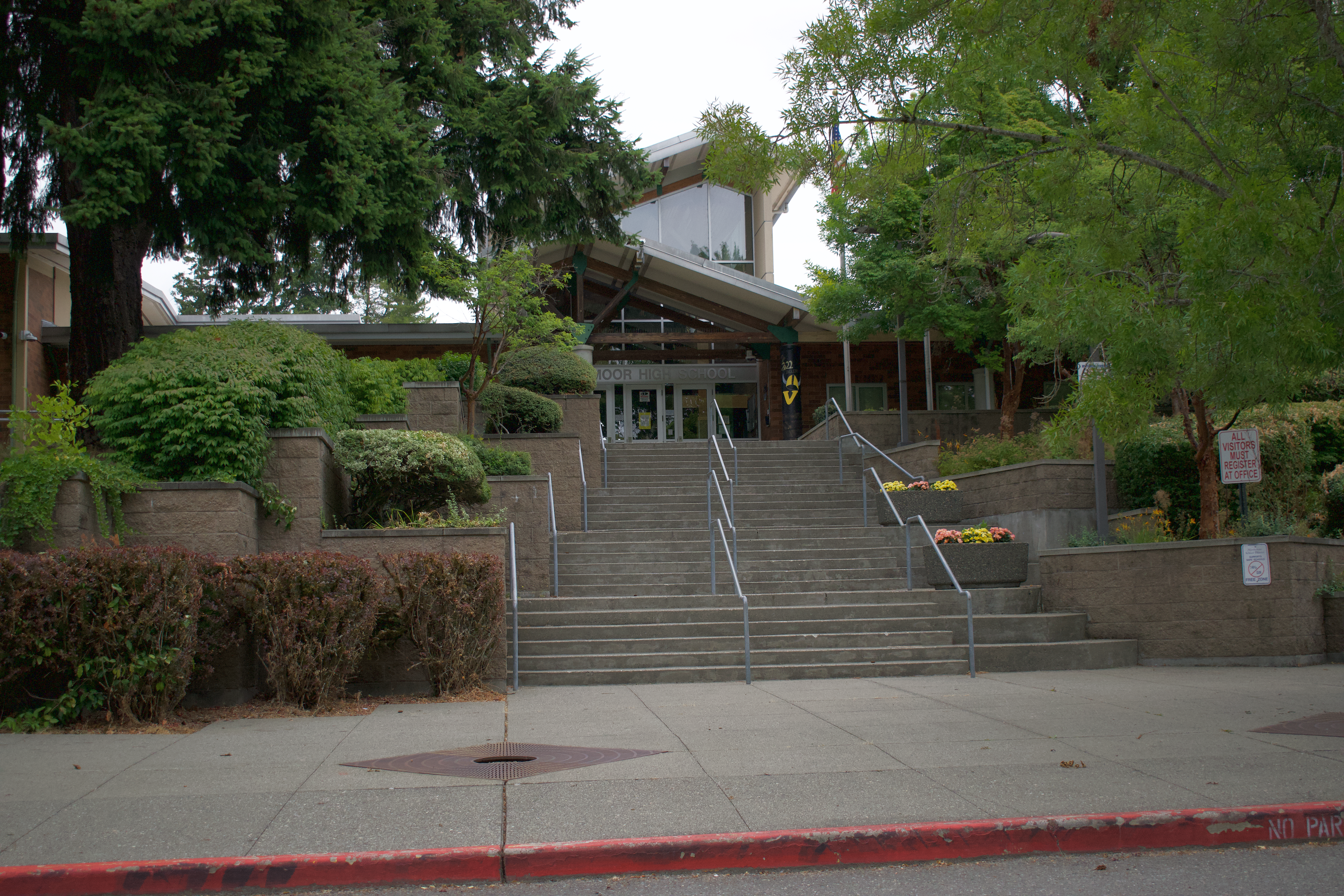
- Inglemoor High School's entrance

Location
- 15500 Simonds Road NE; Kenmore, Washington; United States; 47.740°N 122.222°W

Information
- Type: Public secondary
- Motto: "VIKS" (Voice, Integrity, Knowledge, and Service)
- Established: 1965
- School district: Northshore School District
- NCES District ID: 530591000884
- Superintendent: Justin Irish
- CEEB code: 480101
- Administrator: Adam Desautels, Ebonisha Washington, Shawn Rainwater, Joe Mismas
- Principal: Adam Desautels
- Campus Director: Sarah Beeson, Colin Portugal, Victor Camarena
- Teaching staff: 89
- Grades: 9–12
- Enrollment: 1,463 (2024–2025)
- Student to teacher ratio: 16.6
- Language: English
- Schedule type: Block Schedule
- Hours in school day: 7
- Campus type: Suburban
- Colors: Black and gold
- Athletics: Cross country, football, golf, soccer, swim & dive, tennis, volleyball, crew, water polo, slow-pitch softball, basketball, gymnastics, wrestling, bowling, baseball, softball, track, badminton, lacrosse
- Mascot: Viking
- Rival: Bothell High School, Woodinville High School
- Accreditation: Northwest Accreditation Commission, Washington State Board of Education, Blue Ribbon 2007
- USNWR ranking: 2,227
- Newspaper: Nordic News
- Yearbook: Scandia
- Feeder schools: Northshore Middle School, Kenmore Middle School
- Website: Official website

Inglemoor High School is a public high school located in Kenmore, Washington, United States. It was built in 1964, serving approximately 1600 students in grades 9-12.

Inglemoor's feeder middle schools are Kenmore Middle School and Northshore Middle School. Its feeder elementary schools are Arrowhead, Kenmore, Moorlands, and Woodmoor Elementary Schools.

== History ==
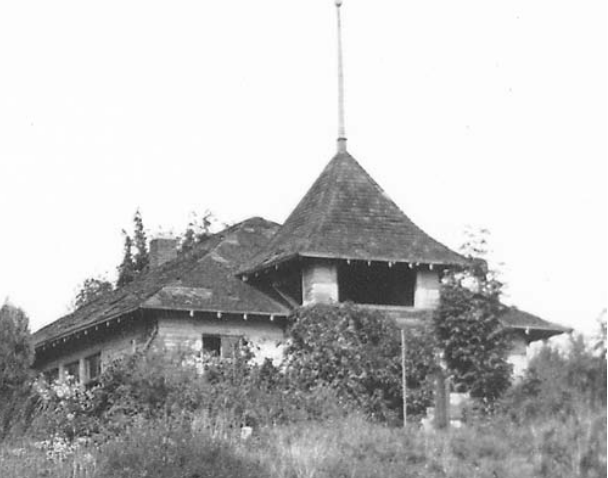
A picture of the city of Kenmore's school house.

Inglemoor High School is the only high school in Kenmore. In 1903, Kenmore School District 141 was established. With a schoolhouse for the children of a nearby mill company's workers in 1914. It cost $1,200, including a large bell in the steeple. It had an above-ground basement and foot-thick concrete walls.

Until 1965 Bothell High School served all high school citizens in Kenmore (and the general Northshore area). However, due to overcrowding, planning for a second high school started. Planning for Inglemoor began in 1959 because Northshore School District qualified for a state appropriation match for construction (at a rate of nine state dollars per school district dollar). Inglemoor was planned by building consultant Harold Silverthorn, and a resource team of 150 district parents, teachers, and school staff who spent two years helping plan the new school. The school plans were approved in 1962, and contractor bids were authorized in early 1963. Construction was delayed due to a court case challenging the legality of the state selling bonds to aid school districts with construction costs. The court voted in favor of the school district in the fall of 1963.

Inglemoor High School opened in the fall of 1965, costing nearly US$2,800,000. It was named after the nearby neighborhoods Inglewood and Moorlands. The school had a campus like architecture, contained 143,000 square feet (13,300 m^{2}) and featured fifty-five classrooms, designed for 1000 students. When it opened, 764 people were enrolled, who were taught by 37 teachers. The first principal was C.R. "Si" Silverson (who had the little theater named after him). The science wing featured four large classrooms, a seminar room, a domed planetarium (which was demolished in 2025 with the second replacement).

It was remodeled in 1998, replacing dirt and gravel with cement walkways, adding roofs over outside hallways, and artificial turf on the football field. By the 1999–2000 school year, enrollment had risen to 1,635 students from Kenmore, Bothell, and Woodinville, served by a staff of eighty six.

The school first offered the International Baccalaureate program in 1997, with a graduating class of 23 when it first started. In 2007, the school became a No Child Left Behind Blue Ribbon School.

After the 2017 school year, the school started accommodating 9th graders as part of a district-wide rebrand of secondary schools.

== Academics ==
Inglemoor became a No Child Left Behind Blue Ribbon School in 2007 (one of only 238 at the time of receiving it), for its consistently high performance in reading and math. Newsweek has ranked Inglemoor in the top two percent of US high schools and has named Inglemoor as one of the "Best American High Schools."

As of October 2025, students at Inglemoor have an average reading proficiency of 91.3% and a math proficiency of 78.2%. Inglemoor students consistently score higher than the average district and state student. The adjusted 4-year cohort graduation rate for the class of 2024 was 95.9%, whereas Northshore School District's corresponding rate is 94.8% and Washington State's is 82.8%.

Of the 365 graduates from Inglemoor's class of 2024, 81.4% (218) are reported to be attending college. Of these college-bound graduates, 63.1% (169) attend a 4-year school in Washington. 18.3% (49) attending a 2-year school. 5.2% (14) attended a Technical School. Around 2.25 million dollars of scholarships were accepted by the Inglemoor 2024 class students, with an average graduating GPA of 3.4.

Compared to the Northshore School District, Inglemoor's class of 2013 has a higher percentage of students going to college (82% vs. 77%). Of 2013 graduates across Washington State, 62% were enrolled in postsecondary education. Graduates of Inglemoor's class of 2013 are disproportionally enrolled in public 4-year Washington schools (42% vs. 31% statewide).

== Demographics ==
Student body composition as of September 2024
Race and ethnicity	Total
White	52.2%
Asians	19.1%
Hispanic	16.9%
Two or more Races	8.8%
Black	2.7%
Native Hawaiian/Pacific Islander	0.5%
American Indian/Alaska Native	0.2%
Sex	Total
Female	50%
Male	49%
Gender X	1%
Income	Total
Low Income	22.2%
Disabilities	Total
Students with disabilities	9.4%

As of September 2024, 52.2% of Inglemoor students identified as White, 0.1% as Asian/Pacific Islander, 19.1% as Asian, 16.9% as Hispanic/Latino of any race, 8.8% as two or more races, 2.7% as Black/African American, 0.5% as Native Hawaiian/other Pacific Islander, and 0.2% as American Indian/Alaskan Native.

In the Northshore School District where Inglemoor is located, the median household income is at $235,102 compared to a state median of $72,098. The median home value is $410,375, compared to a state median of $160,737. As of May 2014, 15.2% of the student population takes part in the Free or Reduced Price Meals program, compared to 17.3% in Northshore School District, and 45.9% in Washington State as a whole.

== International Baccalaureate ==
Inglemoor has been offering the International Baccalaureate program since 1997, with a graduating class of 23 when it first started. It currently offers 22 IB classes. Led by Chris McQueen, Amy Monaghan, and Elizabeth Lund, as of 2025, it is one of 32 high schools in Washington (state) to offer the IB program, with it considered as the largest in the Pacific Northwest. Around 300 students currently attending the school transferred to the school for the IB program from outside the attendance area.

The school offers:

- IB Diploma Students of Distinction (IB Diploma)
- IB Certificate Student of Merit: four or more IB exams
- IB Career Certificate

In 2025, 250 students sat down for an IB exam, with 69 IB Diploma Programme candidates, with an average score of 31.

== Languages ==
Inglemoor teaches multiple languages at the school. Including Mandarin Chinese, French, German, American Sign Language, and Spanish. The school used to feature a Japanese program but it was discontinued due to low enrollment and budget cuts.

== Extracurricular activities ==
=== Athletics ===
Inglemoor has an extensive athletics department. Inglemoor has approximately 700 student athletes. Inglemoor's sports teams play in the KingCo 3A conference and, in many cases, use Pop Keeney Stadium, located in Bothell, Washington, as their home field.

Inglemoor participates in a range of sports, including:

- Baseball
- Badminton
- Boys' and girls' basketball
- Bowling
- Crew
- Cross country
- Football
- Boys' and girls' golf
- Gymnastics
- Boys' and girls' soccer
- Boys' and girls' swim and dive
- Boys' and girls' tennis
- Track and field
- Volleyball
- Boys' and girls' water polo
- Wrestling

==== Swim and dive ====
The girls' swim and dive team has earned four state championships.

==== Crew ====
The women's crew program has attended the USRowing Youth National Champions four times since the program's founding in 2018: 2022, 2023, 2024, and 2025.

==== Golf ====
Inglemoor's golf team has attended state championships many times, including 2025 and 2002. In the 2025 season, the team won undefeated for the Kingco 3A division.

=== Music ===
Inglemoor is known for its music program. The school offers orchestra, band, wind ensemble, and choir.

Inglemoor's Wind Ensemble is nationally known, playing at Carnegie Hall and Lincoln Center in April 2015 along with the Inglemoor Orchestra. The marching band has also won many awards, performing mostly during the football season, with halftime shows consisting of the high-step marching style, highly influenced by the University of Washington's Husky Marching Band. During the boys' and girls' basketball season the program supports each team with pep bands. In the Vancouver Heritage Festival of 2017, five of Inglemoor's instrumental groups and three vocal groups all won First Place Gold in their respective categories, sweeping all of the sections they entered in.

Northshore Concert Hall

From about September 2020 to early 2022, Northshore School District built a $34.5 million new concert hall called Northshore Concert hall on Inglemoor's campus. This addition to the school adds a large concert hall with about 750 seats and additional classroom and instructional areas for the students in the music program.

=== Theater ===
The Inglemoor Theatre Company is made up of both a theater team and an improv team. The theater team does two to three plays per year, and the improv team does four to five improv performances

The theatre company performs at either the theater located at Inglemoor High School (sometimes known as the little theatre, officially the "Si Siverson Theater") or at the Northshore Performing Arts Center located at Bothell High School.

=== DECA ===
Inglemoor's DECA Chapter was ranked number one in the world for several years until 2016 when they ranked 10th at DECA's International Career Development Conference. In 2011, Inglemoor qualified 40 competitors for international competition and saw 25 members attain top 10 or higher honors, including four international champions and five-second-place winners in three events.

=== Model United Nations ===
Inglemoor's MUN delegation is highly ranked in the state, named IngleMUN. The delegation mostly participates in MUNNorthwest events and Vancouver Model Nations.

=== Robotics ===
Inglemoor features an FIRST Robotics Competition (FRC) Washington team 3268, the Valhallabots. The club is student-run and competes in yearly robotics competitions. It started in 2010. It won the Coopertition Award for the Seattle Cascade Regional in 2013.

== Replacement ==
In February 2022, Northshore School District voters voted for a capital bond, approving a replacement for Inglemoor High School with a budget of $100 million. In November, Hutteball + Oremus were selected as architects of the project. It is currently planned to have three staggered phases. In May 2023, BNBuilders were selected as the general contractors of the project.

=== Phase 1 ===
Groundbreaking for phase one of the replacement began on June 17, 2025. The purpose of phase one is to modernize the HVAC system, build a new cafeteria for increased capacity, new classrooms, and replace restrooms with gender-inclusive restrooms. Phase one also includes the demolition of four existing structures and the construction of a new three-story high school building. The new building will be 86,933 square feet and will include a new kitchen, commons and commons plaza, nine science labs, 10 classrooms and counseling offices on both floors.

=== Phase 2 ===
The levy for phase two of the replacement was voted on the February 10, 2026, local election. The new replacement will include constructing a new gym, fitness center, and theater. It may also include a new classroom wing, administrative office, and library, and/or site improvements and vehicular circulation.

=== Phase 3 ===
The remaining replacement will be completed in Phase 3, which may include a new classroom wing, administrative office, and library, as well as site improvements and vehicular circulation. Phase 3 has not been approved yet and requires Phase 2 to pass to get on a future levy.

== Trivia ==
- Christina Aguilera and Little Bow Wow have performed private concerts at Inglemoor, after students set a canned-food drive record, collecting over 450,000 cans.
- The school used to feature a "viking ship" which was a rowboat painted black and gold in the courtyard (which was burned down later by rival Bothell High School students).

== Notable alumni ==
=== Sports ===
- D.D. Acholonu - Houston Texans and Montreal Alouettes linebacker
- Anthony Arena - professional soccer player for the Houston Dynamo.
- Korel Engin - gold medal basketball player
- Jamie Finch - professional soccer player for the Carolina RailHawks.
- Jeff Gove - professional golfer
- Bobby Jenks - former Chicago White Sox closer and Boston Red Sox setup man
- Evan Meek - Pittsburgh Pirates relief pitcher
- Terry Rennaker - former linebacker for the Seattle Seahawks
- Candy Costie - Olympic sychronized Swimmer
- Mike Marsh - Olympic 200 meter sprint champion (moved to California junior year)

=== Arts ===
- Michael Dahlquist - musician in the band Silkworm
- Blake Lewis - American Idol finalist
- Alyssa London - Miss Alaska USA 2017
- Deanna Mustard - voice actress, notably Princess Daisy in the Super Mario video games
- Sabzi - musician
- Steve Fossen - Heart band
- Nat Puff - Online comedian and musician by the stage name Left at London
- Chris Walla - Former guitarist and songwriter in the band Death Cab for Cutie
- Roger Fisher - rock group Heart

=== Politics and news ===
- Maxine Dexter- Oregon politician
- Charissa Thompson - Fox Sports personality

=== Other ===
- Zoe Baird - American lawyer and executive
