= List of University of Evansville alumni =

== Entertainment ==
- David Emge, actor Dawn of the Dead
- Crista Flanagan, actress, comedian MadTV
- Kelli Giddish, actress All My Children, "Law & Order: SVU"
- Ron Glass, actor Firefly, Barney Miller
- Deirdre Lovejoy, actress The Wire
- Rami Malek, Academy Award-winning actor The Pacific, Night at the Museum, The War at Home, Mr. Robot and Bohemian Rhapsody
- Jack McBrayer, actor 30 Rock, Forgetting Sarah Marshall
- David McFadzean producer and writer of Home Improvement and Roseanne
- Clint McCune, musician
- Jim Michaels, producer of Supernatural, Everybody Hates Chris, and Lois & Clark: The New Adventures of Superman
- Lennon Parham, producer, director, actress Playing House
- Stephen Plunkett, actor The Mend, War Horse, The Orphans' Home Cycle
- Carrie Preston, actress, True Blood
- The Watson Twins, Musicians
- Matt Williams, producer and writer of The Cosby Show, Home Improvement, and Roseanne
- Rutina Wesley, actress True Blood

== Politics ==
- Lloyd Winnecke, 34th Mayor of Evansville

== Business ==
- Khalid Almolhem, Director General of Saudi Arabian Airlines

== Sports ==
- Marty Amsler, former National Football League defensive end
- Andy Benes, MLB All-star
- Don Buse, NBA All-Star
- Jamey Carroll, former MLB player
- Alec Dufty, NY Red Bulls MLS Goal Keeper
- Cory Elenio, Columbus Crew MLS Midfielder
- Sal Fasano, MLB player
- Kyle Freeland, MLB player
- Scott Haffner, Former NBA player drafted in the 2nd round of the 1989 NBA draft
- Brad Leaf, American-Israeli basketball player for Hapoel Galil Elyon and Maccabi Tel Aviv of the Israel Premier League
- Troy Perkins, D.C. United MLS Goalkeeper
- Jerry Sloan, NBA player and Hall of Fame head coach
- David Weir, soccer player for Everton F.C., Rangers F.C., Hearts and Scotland

== Sciences and engineering ==
- John Frederick Dashiel, psychologist, president of the American Psychological Association(1938).
- Richard Harbert Smith, professor and researcher of aeronautical engineering at MIT (1929/45).

== Other ==
- Adam Alexander, Fox Sports 1 NASCAR Host and Play-by-Play Announcer
- John B. Conaway, Lieutenant General and former Chief of National Guard Bureau
- Marilyn Durham, novelist
- David J. Lawson, bishop of the United Methodist Church
- Lisel Mueller, poet who won the Pulitzer Prize for Poetry in 1997
- Culla Johnson Vayhinger (1867–1924), President, Woman's Christian Temperance Union of Indiana
