= Kenmore Middle School =

Kenmore Middle School may refer to:

- Kenmore Middle School, Arlington County, Virginia, US
- Kenmore Middle School (Kenmore, WA), US
