= Inclined Temple =

Mountain in the American state of Utah

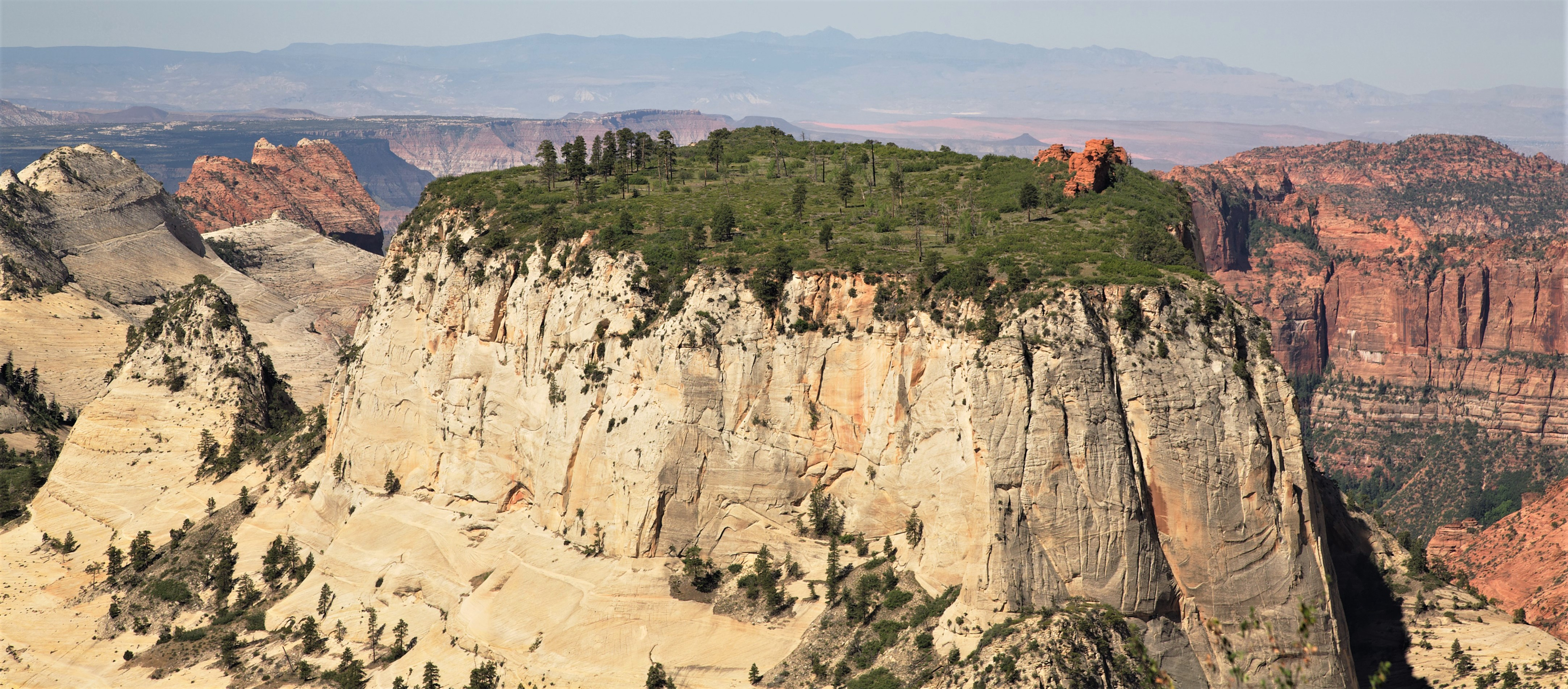
- East aspect, from West Rim Trail

Highest point
- Elevation: 7,150 ft (2,180 m)
- Prominence: 630 ft (190 m)
- Parent peak: Point 7370 (7,370 ft)
- Isolation: 0.92 mi (1.48 km)
- Coordinates: 37°16′46″N 113°00′25″W

Geography
- Location within Utah Location within the United States
- Country: United States
- State: Utah
- County: Washington
- Protected area: Zion National Park
- Parent range: Colorado Plateau
- Topo map: USGS The Guardian Angels

Geology
- Rock age: Jurassic
- Rock type: Navajo sandstone

Climbing
- Easiest route: class 5+ climbing

Inclined Temple is a remote 7,150-foot (2,180 meter) elevation summit located in Zion National Park, in Washington County of southwest Utah, United States.

== Description ==
Inclined Temple, a mesa-like formation composed of Navajo Sandstone, is situated 7.0 mi (11.3 km) north of Springdale, Utah. Its nearest neighbor is Ivins Mountain, one half mile to the north, and South Guardian Angel is set approximately three miles to the west-northwest. Its name was officially adopted in 1935 by the U.S. Board on Geographic Names. This geographical feature is so named because its broad top has a decided incline. Precipitation runoff from this mountain drains into North Creek, a tributary of the Virgin River.

== Climate ==
Spring and fall are the most favorable seasons to visit Inclined Temple. According to the Köppen climate classification system, it is located in a Cold semi-arid climate zone, which is defined by the coldest month having an average mean temperature below 32 °F (0 °C), and at least 50% of the total annual precipitation being received during the spring and summer. This desert climate receives less than 10 inches (250 millimeters) of annual rainfall, and snowfall is generally light during the winter.

== See also ==
- Geology of the Zion and Kolob canyons area
- Colorado Plateau

== Gallery ==
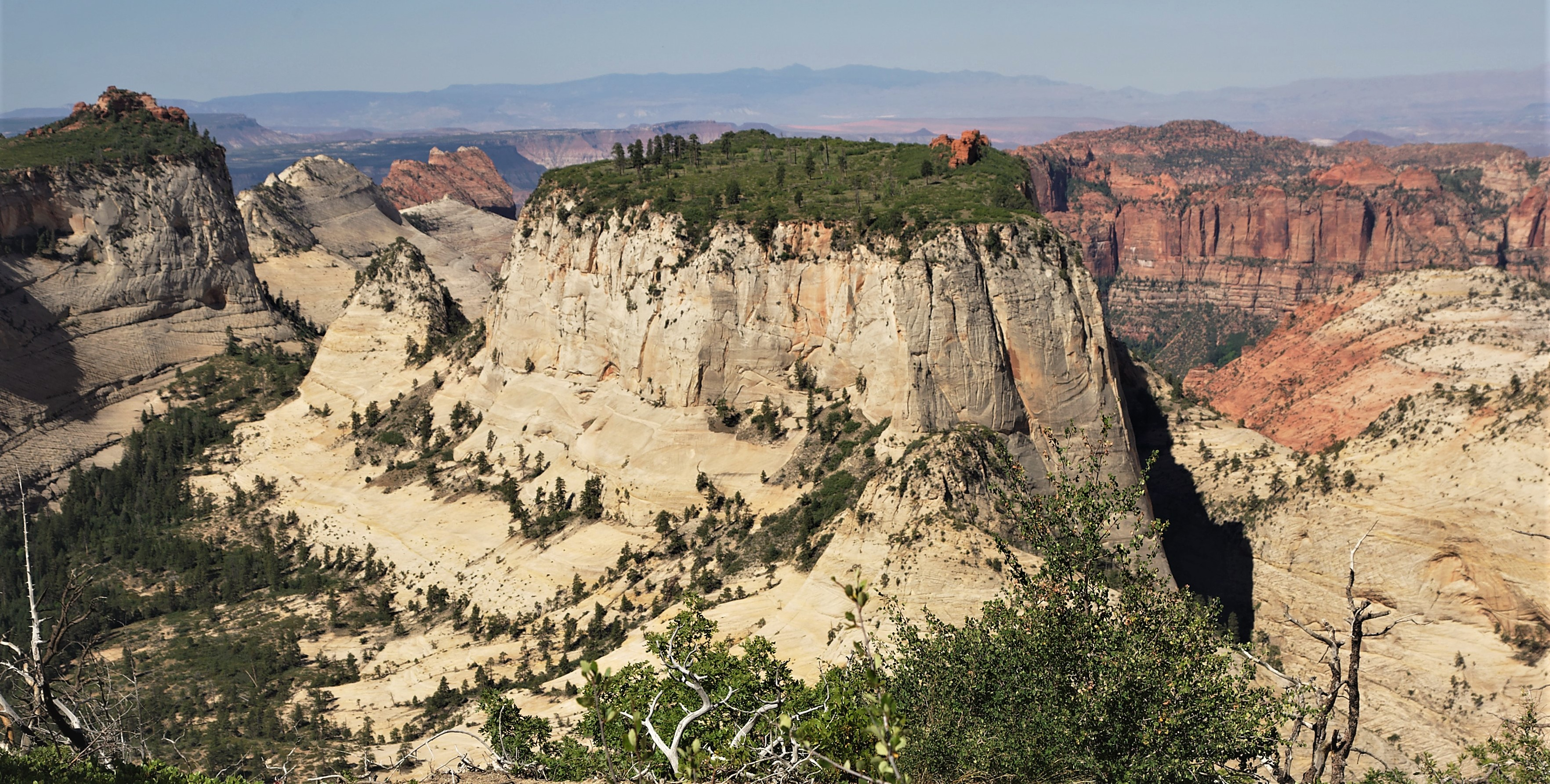
Inclined Temple seen from Zion's West Rim Trail

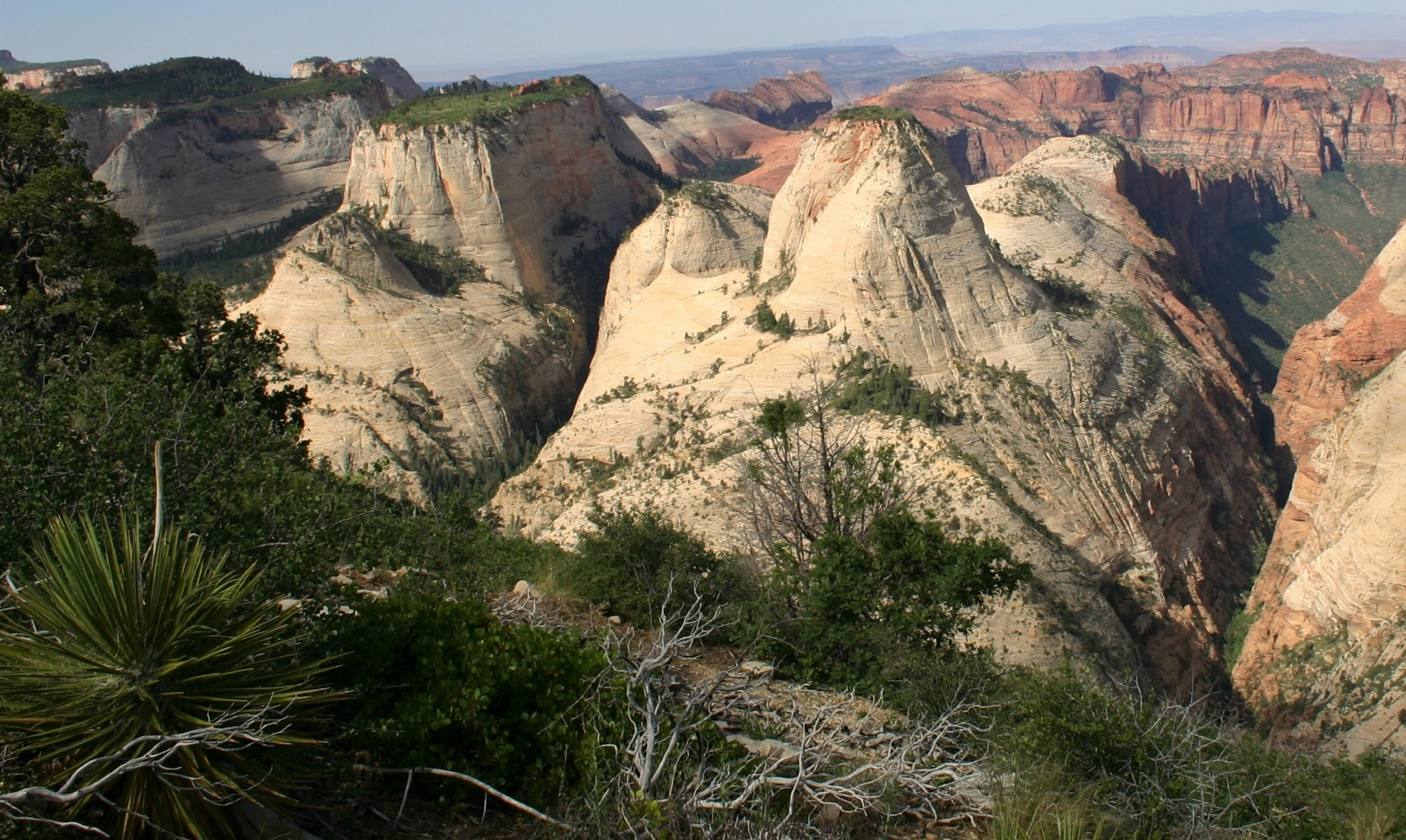
Inclined Temple {left} and Ivins Mountain (right of center) seen from West Rim Trail

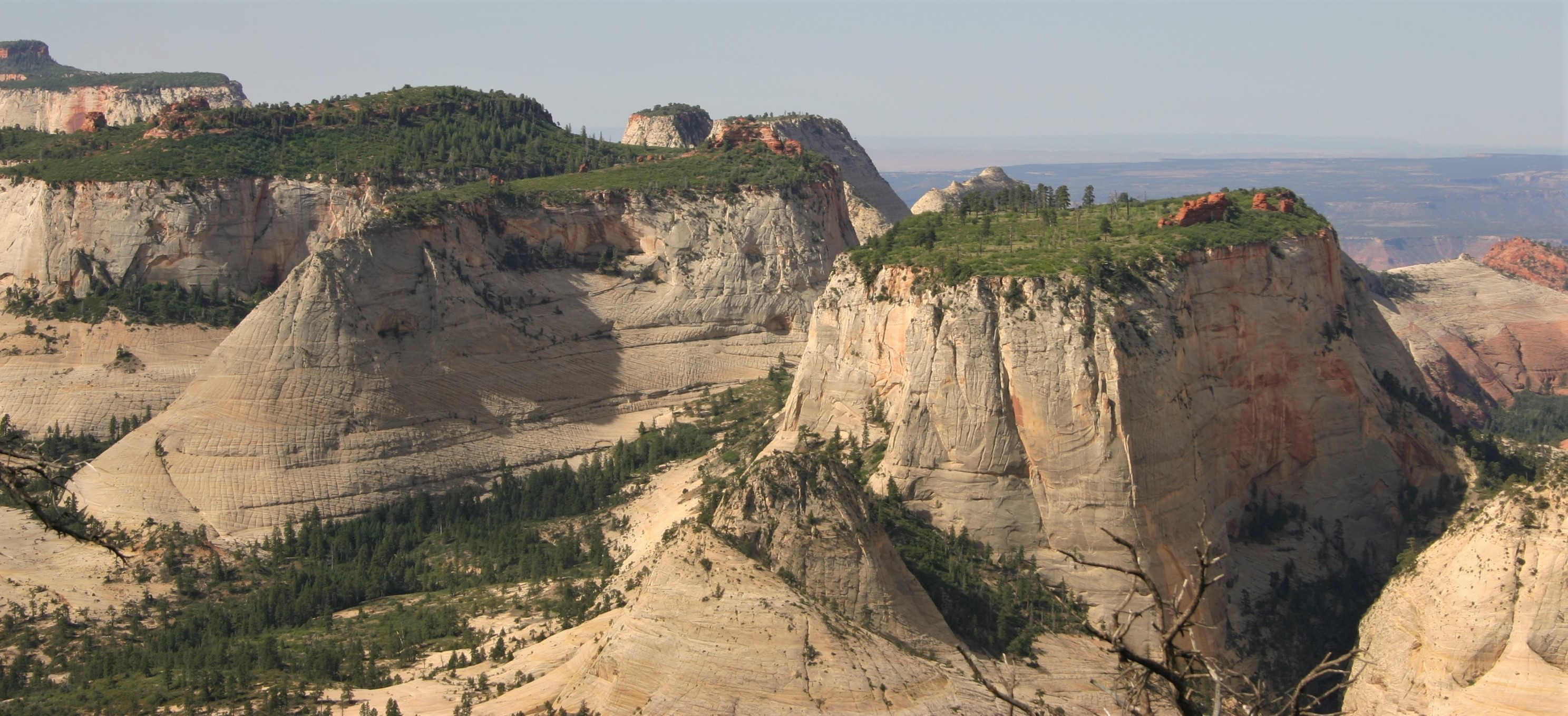
Point 7370 (left), Inclined Temple (right), The Bishopric (two peaks centered in back)

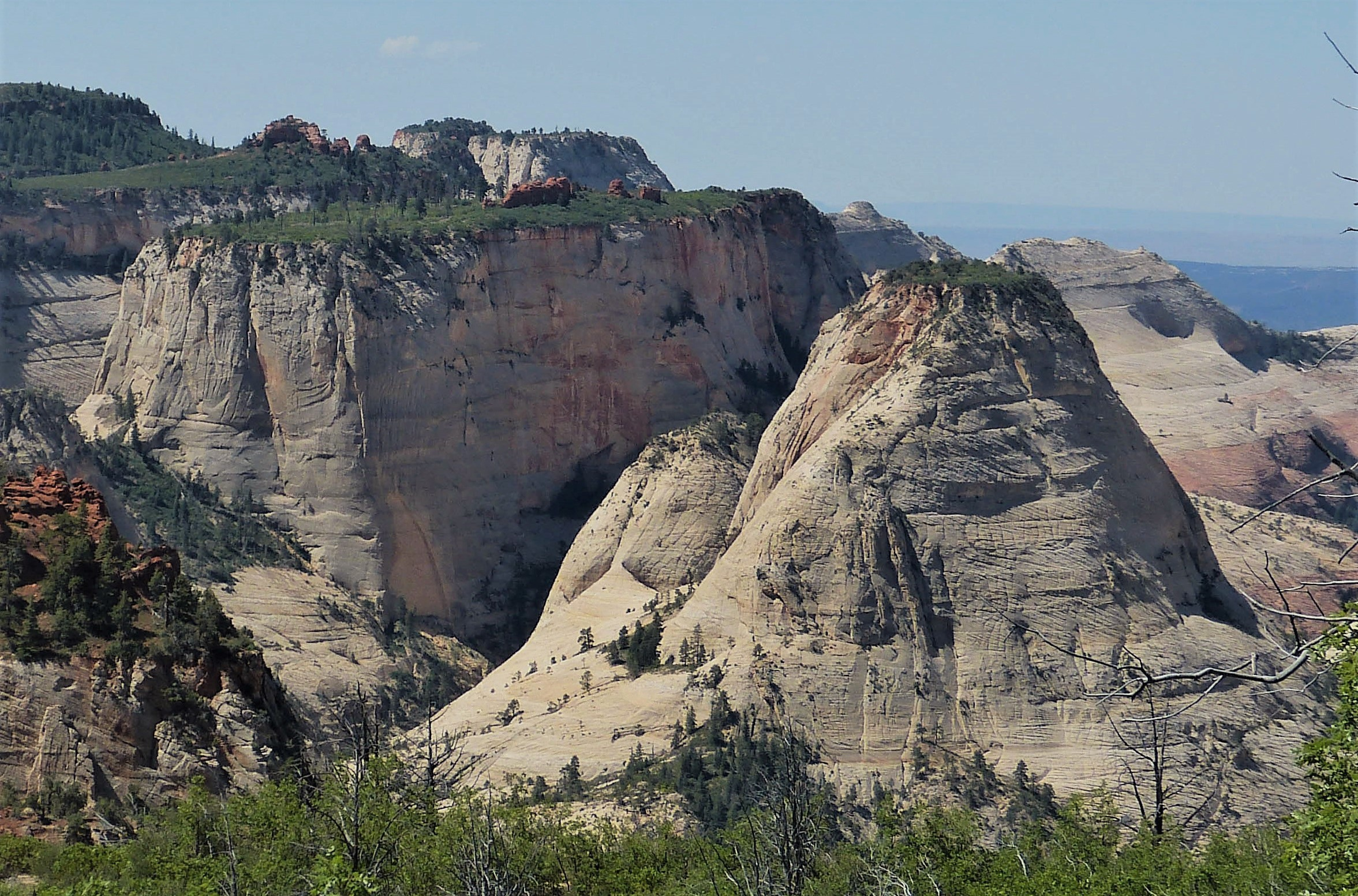
Ivins Mountain (right), Inclined Temple (left)

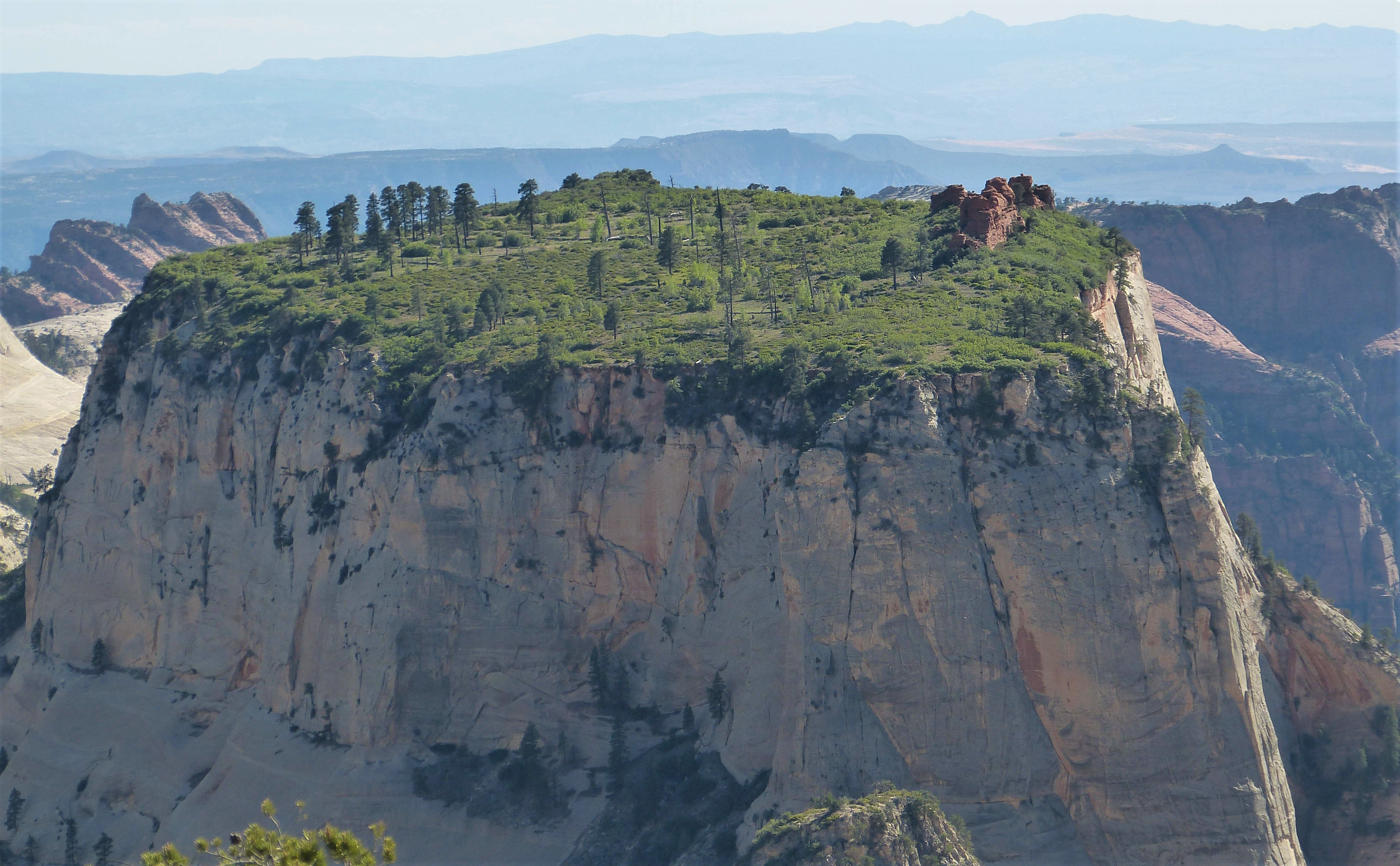
