= List of NCAA major college football yearly sacks leaders =

List of yearly NCAA sack leaders

The list of NCAA major college football yearly sack leaders identifies the NCAA major college sack leaders. Beginning with the 2000 NCAA Division I-A football season, when the NCAA began maintaining official sack records, the list includes each year's leaders both in total sacks and in sacks per game. The list is limited to players for major college programs, which includes the NCAA Division I Football Bowl Subdivision (2006–present), NCAA Division I-A (1978–2005), and NCAA University Division (1956–1977).

== Sack leaders since 2000 ==
=== Total sacks ===
Key
Symbol	Meaning
Leader	The player who recorded the most sacks in college football
Sk	The total number of sacks the player had
*	Set the official single-season sacks record

College football yearly sacks leaders
Season	Leader	Sk	Team	Refs
2000	Julius Peppers	15.0*	North Carolina	
2001	Dwight Freeney	17.5*	Syracuse	
2002	Terrell Suggs	24.0*	Arizona State	
2003	D. D. Acholonu	16.5	Washington State	
2003	Dave Ball	16.5	UCLA	
2003	Kenechi Udeze	16.5	USC	
2004	Johnathan Goddard	16.0	Marshall	
2005	Elvis Dumervil	20.0	Louisville	
2006	Ameer Ismail	17.0	Western Michigan	
2007	Greg Middleton	16.0	Indiana	
2008	Jerry Hughes	15.0	TCU	
2009	Von Miller	17.0	Texas A&M	
2010	Da'Quan Bowers	15.5	Clemson	
2011	Whitney Mercilus	16.0	Illinois	
2012	Jarvis Jones	14.0	Georgia	
2013	Trent Murphy	15.0	Stanford	
2014	Hauʻoli Kikaha	19.0	Washington	
2015	Carl Nassib	15.5	Penn State	
2016	Harold Landry	16.5	Boston College	
2017	Joe Ostman	14.0	Central Michigan	
2017	Sutton Smith	14.0	Northern Illinois	
2018	Jaylon Ferguson	17.5	Louisiana Tech	
2019	Chase Young	16.5	Ohio State	
2020	Cade Hall	10.0	San Jose State	
2021	Will Anderson Jr.	17.5	Alabama	
2022	Tuli Tuipulotu	13.5	USC	
2023	Javon Solomon	16.0	Troy	
2024	Mike Green	17.0	Marshall	
2025	David Bailey	14.5	Texas Tech	
2025	Nadame Tucker	14.5	Western Michigan	

=== Sacks per game ===
College football yearly sacks per game leaders
Season	Leader	Sk/G	Team	Refs
2000	Michael Josiah	1.39*	Louisville	
2001	Dwight Freeney	1.46*	Syracuse	
2002	Terrell Suggs	1.71*	Arizona State	
2003	D. D. Acholonu	1.27	Washington State	
2003	Dave Ball	1.27	UCLA	
2003	Kenechi Udeze	1.27	USC	
2004	Johnathan Goddard	1.33	Marshall	
2005	Elvis Dumervil	1.67	Louisville	
2006	Ameer Ismail	1.31	Western Michigan	
2007	Greg Middleton	1.23	Indiana	
2008	Jerry Hughes	1.15	TCU	
2009	Von Miller	1.31	Texas A&M	
2010	Da'Quan Bowers	1.19	Clemson	
2011	Whitney Mercilus	1.23	Illinois	
2012	Quanterus Smith	1.25	Western Kentucky	
2013	Marcus Smith II	1.12	Louisville	
2014	Nate Orchard	1.42	Utah	
2015	Carl Nassib	1.19	Penn State	
2016	Harold Landry	1.27	Boston College	
2017	Joe Ostman	1.27	Central Michigan	
2018	Jaylon Ferguson	1.35	Louisiana Tech	
2019	Chase Young	1.38	Ohio State	
2020	Cade Hall	1.43 (Note: In 2020, Zion Tupuola-Fetui (Washington) averaged 1.75 sacks per game with 7 sacks in four games. Because of limited games due to COVID in 2020, teams must have played at least six games to be eligible for per game records in 2020.)	San Jose State	
2021	Andre Carter II	1.19	Army	
2022	Nick Herbig	1.0	Wisconsin	
2022	Jose Ramirez	1.0	Eastern Michigan	
2023	Jonah Elliss	1.20	Utah	
2024	Donovan Ezeiruaku	1.38	Boston College	
2025	Nadame Tucker	1.12	Western Michigan	

== Pre-2000 unofficial data ==
Before 2000 the NCAA did not compile official sack statistics. This chart reflects unofficial sack statistics compiled by historians mostly from newspapers accounts. No available data for missing years.

College football yearly sacks leaders
Season	Leader	Sk	Team	Refs
1999	Corey Moore	17	Virginia Tech	
1996	Peter Boulware	19	Florida State	
1988	Derrick Thomas	27	Alabama	
1987	Chad Hennings	24	Air Force	
1983	Reggie White	15	Tennessee	
1974	Randy White	12	Maryland	

== Leading programs ==
Programs with multiple sack leaders (at least two different individuals, in any of the two categories) include:

Count	Program	Players
3	Louisville	Elvis Dumervil; Michael Josiah; Marcus Smith II
2	Boston College	Donovan Ezeiruaku; Harold Landry
2	Marshall	Johnathan Goddard; Mike Green
2	USC	Tuli Tuipulotu; Kenechi Udeze
2	Utah	Jonah Elliss; Nate Orchard
2	Western Michigan	Ameer Ismail; Nadame Tucker
