= Mill Creek East, Washington =

- CDP
- Location within Washington (state)
- Coordinates: 47°50′10″N 122°11′16″W
- Country: United States
- State: Washington
- County: Snohomish

Area
  - Total: 11.5 km^{2} (4.45 sq mi)
  - Land: 11.5 km^{2} (4.45 sq mi)
- Elevation: 108 m (354 ft)

Population (2020)
  - Total: 24,912
  - Density: 2,160/km^{2} (5,600/sq mi)
- Time zone: UTC-8 (PST)
  - Summer (DST): UTC-7 (PDT)
- ZIP Code: 98012
- Area codes: 360, 564

Mill Creek East is a census-designated place (CDP) located in Snohomish County, Washington. The population was 24,912 at the 2020 census. The CDP comprises an area southeast of the city of Mill Creek that includes many new single-family housing developments as well as the new North Creek High School.

== Demographics ==
Historical population
Census	Pop.	Note	%±
2010	15,709		—
2020	24,912		58.6%
U.S. Decennial Census; 2000 2010 2020

Mill Creek East first appeared as a census designated place in the 2010 U.S. census formed from parts of deleted North Creek and Seattle Hill-Silver Firs CDPs.

=== Racial and ethnic composition ===
Mill Creek East CDP, Washington – Racial and ethnic composition Note: the US Census treats Hispanic/Latino as an ethnic category. This table excludes Latinos from the racial categories and assigns them to a separate category. Hispanics/Latinos may be of any race.
Race / Ethnicity (NH = Non-Hispanic)	Pop 2010	Pop 2020	% 2010	% 2020
White alone (NH)	10,438	11,066	66.45%	44.42%
Black or African American alone (NH)	258	591	1.64%	2.37%
Native American or Alaska Native alone (NH)	79	67	0.50%	0.27%
Asian alone (NH)	3,097	9,740	19.71%	39.10%
Native Hawaiian or Pacific Islander alone (NH)	45	66	0.29%	0.26%
Other race alone (NH)	49	146	0.31%	0.59%
Mixed race or Multiracial (NH)	581	1,527	3.70%	6.13%
Hispanic or Latino (any race)	1,162	1,709	7.40%	6.86%
Total	15,709	24,912	100.00%	100.00%

=== 2020 census ===
As of the 2020 census, Mill Creek East had a population of 24,912. The median age was 34.9 years, with 31.1% of residents under the age of 18 and 7.3% 65 years of age or older. For every 100 females there were 99.8 males, and for every 100 females age 18 and over there were 96.6 males age 18 and over.

100.0% of residents lived in urban areas, while 0.0% lived in rural areas.

There were 7,945 households in Mill Creek East, of which 7,587 were family households; 55.2% had children under the age of 18 living in them. Of all households, 72.7% were married-couple households, 9.3% were households with a male householder and no spouse or partner present, and 13.5% were households with a female householder and no spouse or partner present. About 11.2% of all households were made up of individuals and 3.5% had someone living alone who was 65 years of age or older.

There were 8,176 housing units, of which 2.8% were vacant. The homeowner vacancy rate was 1.5% and the rental vacancy rate was 3.5%.

Racial composition as of the 2020 census
Race	Number	Percent
White	11,425	45.9%
Black or African American	610	2.4%
American Indian and Alaska Native	101	0.4%
Asian	9,774	39.2%
Native Hawaiian and Other Pacific Islander	68	0.3%
Some other race	689	2.8%
Two or more races	2,245	9.0%

== Geography ==
Mill Creek East is located at coordinates 47°50'10 "N 122°11'16"W.
