= Bothell East, Washington =

- CDP
- Location of Bothell East, Washington.
- Coordinates: 47°48′23″N 122°11′4″W
- Country: United States
- State: Washington
- County: Snohomish

Area
  - Total: 2.05 sq mi (5.31 km^{2})
  - Land: 2.05 sq mi (5.31 km^{2})
  - Water: 0 sq mi (0.00 km^{2})
- Elevation: 387 ft (118 m)

Population (2020)
  - Total: 13,970
  - Density: 6,814/sq mi (2,630.9/km^{2})
- Time zone: UTC-8 (Pacific (PST))
  - Summer (DST): UTC-7 (PDT)
- GNIS feature ID: 2584947

Bothell East is a census-designated place (CDP) in Snohomish County, Washington, United States. As of the 2020 census, Bothell East had a population of 13,970. Bothell East is one of several CDPs that were created out of the former North Creek CDP in 2010.

Bothell East, along with Bothell West, are recognized as part of Bothell.

== Geography ==
Bothell East is located at 47°48′23″N 122°11′4″W (47.806511, -122.184306).

According to the United States Census Bureau, the CDP has a total area of 2.05 square miles (5.31 km^{2}), all of it land.

== Demographics ==
Historical population
Census	Pop.	Note	%±
2010	8,018		—
2020	13,970		74.2%
U.S. Decennial Census; 2000 2010

Bothell East first appeared as a census designated place in the 2010 U.S. census formed from part of the deleted North Creek CDP.

=== Racial and ethnic composition ===
Bothell East CDP, Washington – Racial and ethnic composition Note: the US Census treats Hispanic/Latino as an ethnic category. This table excludes Latinos from the racial categories and assigns them to a separate category. Hispanics/Latinos may be of any race.
Race / Ethnicity (NH = Non-Hispanic)	Pop 2010	Pop 2020	% 2010	% 2020
White alone (NH)	4,830	5,289	60.24%	37.86%
Black or African American alone (NH)	154	354	1.92%	2.53%
Native American or Alaska Native alone (NH)	36	43	0.45%	0.31%
Asian alone (NH)	2,220	6,218	27.69%	44.51%
Native Hawaiian or Pacific Islander alone (NH)	17	27	0.21%	0.19%
Other race alone (NH)	15	124	0.19%	0.89%
Mixed race or Multiracial (NH)	287	736	3.58%	5.27%
Hispanic or Latino (any race)	459	1,179	5.72%	8.44%
Total	8,018	13,970	100.00%	100.00%

=== 2020 census ===
As of the 2020 census, Bothell East had a population of 13,970. The median age was 33.9 years. 30.6% of residents were under the age of 18 and 7.8% of residents were 65 years of age or older. For every 100 females there were 97.8 males, and for every 100 females age 18 and over there were 94.2 males age 18 and over.

100.0% of residents lived in urban areas, while 0.0% lived in rural areas.

There were 4,566 households in Bothell East, of which 52.6% had children under the age of 18 living in them. Of all households, 67.8% were married-couple households, 10.8% were households with a male householder and no spouse or partner present, and 16.3% were households with a female householder and no spouse or partner present. About 13.8% of all households were made up of individuals and 4.7% had someone living alone who was 65 years of age or older.

There were 4,770 housing units, of which 4.3% were vacant. The homeowner vacancy rate was 1.2% and the rental vacancy rate was 7.3%.

Racial composition as of the 2020 census
Race	Number	Percent
White	5,470	39.2%
Black or African American	366	2.6%
American Indian and Alaska Native	64	0.5%
Asian	6,230	44.6%
Native Hawaiian and Other Pacific Islander	27	0.2%
Some other race	657	4.7%
Two or more races	1,156	8.3%
