= Bothell West, Washington =

- CDP
- Location of Bothell West, Washington.
- Coordinates: 47°48′19″N 122°14′27″W
- Country: United States
- State: Washington
- County: Snohomish

Area
  - Total: 4.22 sq mi (10.92 km^{2})
  - Land: 4.22 sq mi (10.92 km^{2})
  - Water: 0 sq mi (0.00 km^{2})
- Elevation: 482 ft (147 m)

Population (2010)
  - Total: 16,607
  - Density: 3,938/sq mi (1,520.5/km^{2})
- Time zone: UTC-8 (Pacific (PST))
  - Summer (DST): UTC-7 (PDT)
- GNIS feature ID: 2584948

Bothell West is a census-designated place (CDP) in Snohomish County, Washington, United States. As of the 2020 census, Bothell West had a population of 22,015. Bothell West is one of several CDPs that were created out of the former North Creek CDP in 2010.

Bothell West, along with Bothell East, are recognized as part of unincorporated Bothell.

== Geography ==
Bothell West is located at 47°48′19″N 122°14′27″W (47.805218, -122.240703).

According to the United States Census Bureau, the CDP has a total area of 4.217 square miles (10.92 km^{2}), all of it land.

== Demographics ==
Historical population
Census	Pop.	Note	%±
2010	16,607		—
2020	22,015		32.6%
U.S. Decennial Census; 2000 2010

Bothell West first appeared as a census designated place in the 2010 U.S. census formed from part of Alderwood Manor CDP and the deleted North Creek CDP.

=== Racial and ethnic composition ===
Bothell West CDP, Washington – Racial and ethnic composition Note: the US Census treats Hispanic/Latino as an ethnic category. This table excludes Latinos from the racial categories and assigns them to a separate category. Hispanics/Latinos may be of any race.
Race / Ethnicity (NH = Non-Hispanic)	Pop 2010	Pop 2020	% 2010	% 2020
White alone (NH)	12,163	12,496	73.24%	56.76%
Black or African American alone (NH)	326	654	1.96%	2.97%
Native American or Alaska Native alone (NH)	102	93	0.61%	0.42%
Asian alone (NH)	2,102	4,887	12.66%	22.20%
Native Hawaiian or Pacific Islander alone (NH)	45	70	0.27%	0.32%
Other race alone (NH)	26	111	0.16%	0.50%
Mixed race or Multiracial (NH)	642	1,605	3.87%	7.29%
Hispanic or Latino (any race)	1,201	2,099	7.23%	9.53%
Total	16,607	22,015	100.00%	100.00%

=== 2020 census ===
As of the 2020 census, Bothell West had a population of 22,015. The median age was 36.3 years. 24.6% of residents were under the age of 18 and 11.4% of residents were 65 years of age or older. For every 100 females there were 98.4 males, and for every 100 females age 18 and over there were 97.7 males age 18 and over.

100.0% of residents lived in urban areas, while 0.0% lived in rural areas.

There were 7,851 households in Bothell West, of which 39.0% had children under the age of 18 living in them. Of all households, 62.0% were married-couple households, 14.1% were households with a male householder and no spouse or partner present, and 17.3% were households with a female householder and no spouse or partner present. About 17.1% of all households were made up of individuals and 6.3% had someone living alone who was 65 years of age or older.

There were 8,049 housing units, of which 2.5% were vacant. The homeowner vacancy rate was 0.8% and the rental vacancy rate was 3.3%.

Racial composition as of the 2020 census
Race	Number	Percent
White	12,859	58.4%
Black or African American	683	3.1%
American Indian and Alaska Native	116	0.5%
Asian	4,922	22.4%
Native Hawaiian and Other Pacific Islander	71	0.3%
Some other race	978	4.4%
Two or more races	2,386	10.8%
