= Ivins Mountain =

Mountain in the American state of Utah

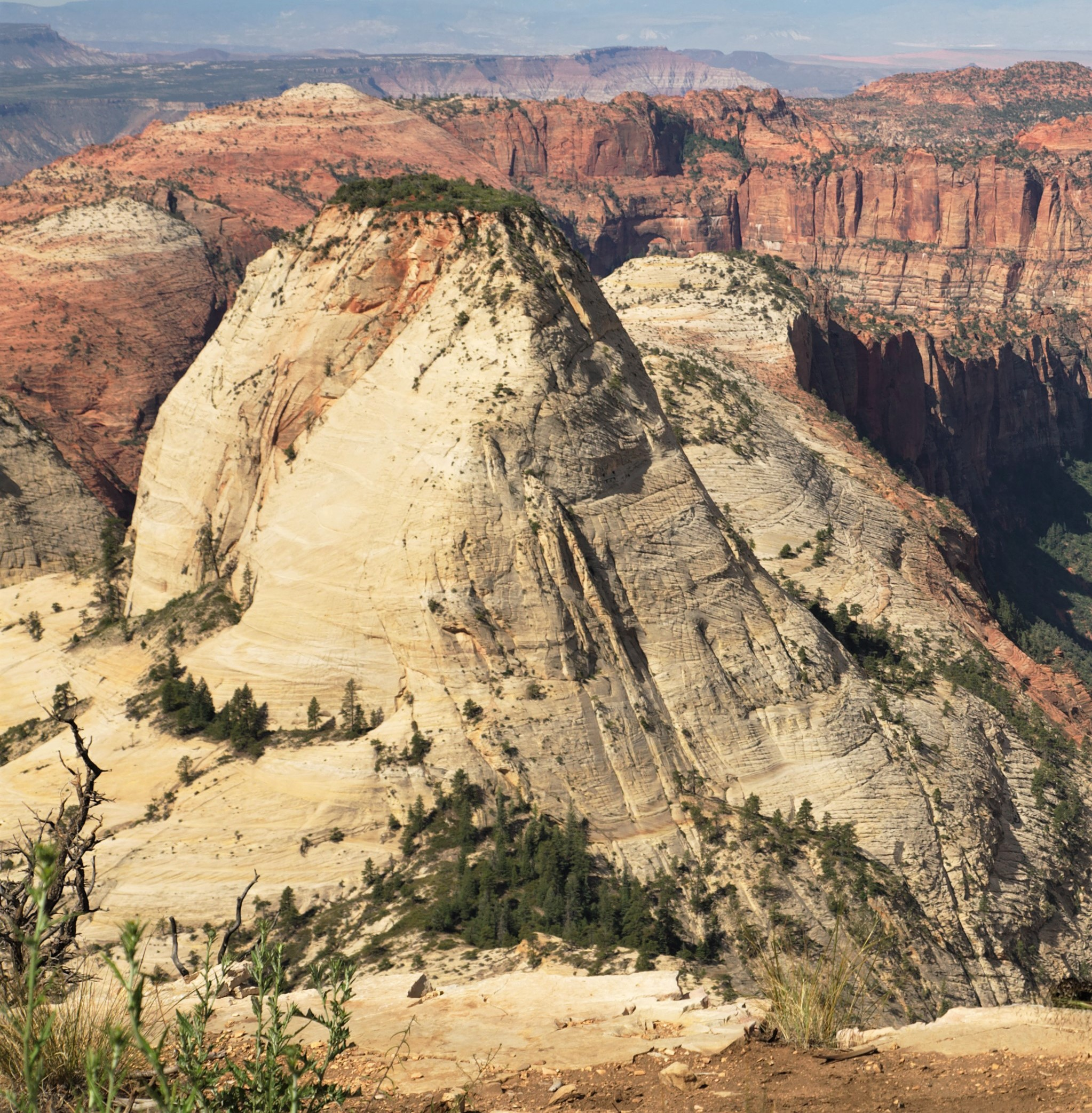
- East aspect, from West Rim Trail

Highest point
- Elevation: 7,019 ft (2,139 m)
- Prominence: 659 ft (201 m)
- Parent peak: Inclined Temple (7,150 ft)
- Isolation: 0.50 mi (0.80 km)
- Coordinates: 37°17′13″N 113°00′21″W

Geography
- Location within Utah Location within the United States
- Country: United States
- State: Utah
- County: Washington
- Protected area: Zion National Park
- Parent range: Colorado Plateau
- Topo map: USGS The Guardian Angels

Geology
- Rock age: Jurassic
- Rock type: Navajo sandstone

Climbing
- Easiest route: class 5+ climbing

Ivins Mountain is a remote 7,019-foot (2,139 m) Navajo Sandstone summit located in Zion National Park, in Washington County of southwest Utah, United States.

== Description ==
Ivins Mountain is situated 7.5 mi (12.1 km) north of Springdale, Utah. Its nearest higher neighbor is Inclined Temple, one half mile to the south, and South Guardian Angel is set approximately three miles to the west. Its name was officially adopted in 1935 by the U.S. Board on Geographic Names. This geographical feature is named after Anthony W. Ivins (1852–1934), a pioneer of southern Utah, and apostle of the Church of Jesus Christ of Latter-day Saints. The town of Ivins, Utah, also bears his name. The first ascent of Ivins Mountain via its west face was made in April 2015 by Dan Stih and Matthew Mower. Precipitation runoff from this mountain drains into North Creek, a tributary of the Virgin River.

== Climate ==
Spring and fall are the most favorable seasons to visit Ivins Mountain. According to the Köppen climate classification system, it is located in a Cold semi-arid climate zone, which is defined by the coldest month having an average mean temperature below 32 °F (0 °C), and at least 50% of the total annual precipitation being received during the spring and summer. This desert climate receives less than 10 inches (250 millimeters) of annual rainfall, and snowfall is generally light during the winter.

== Gallery ==
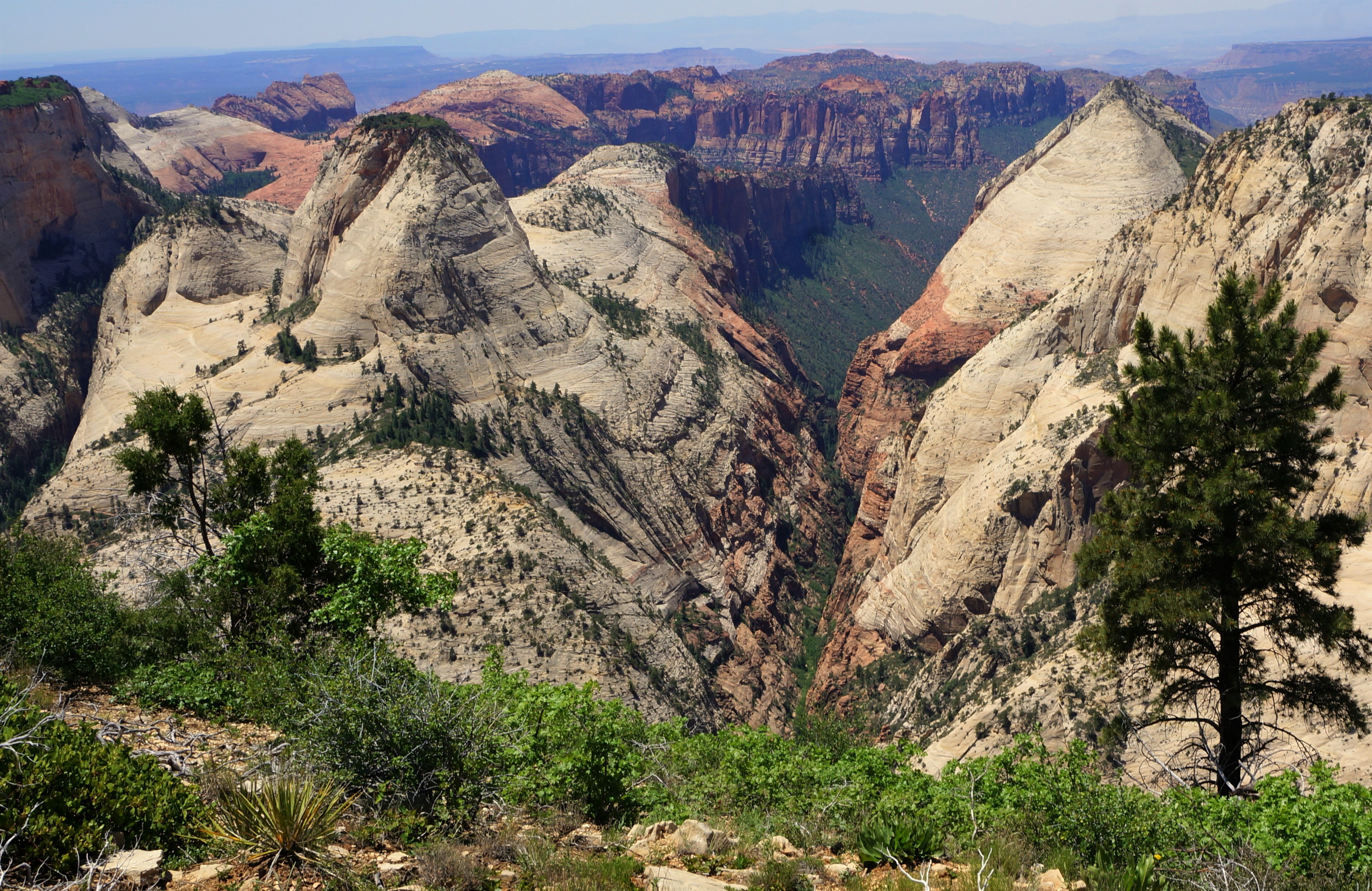
Ivins Mountain (left), seen from West Rim Trail

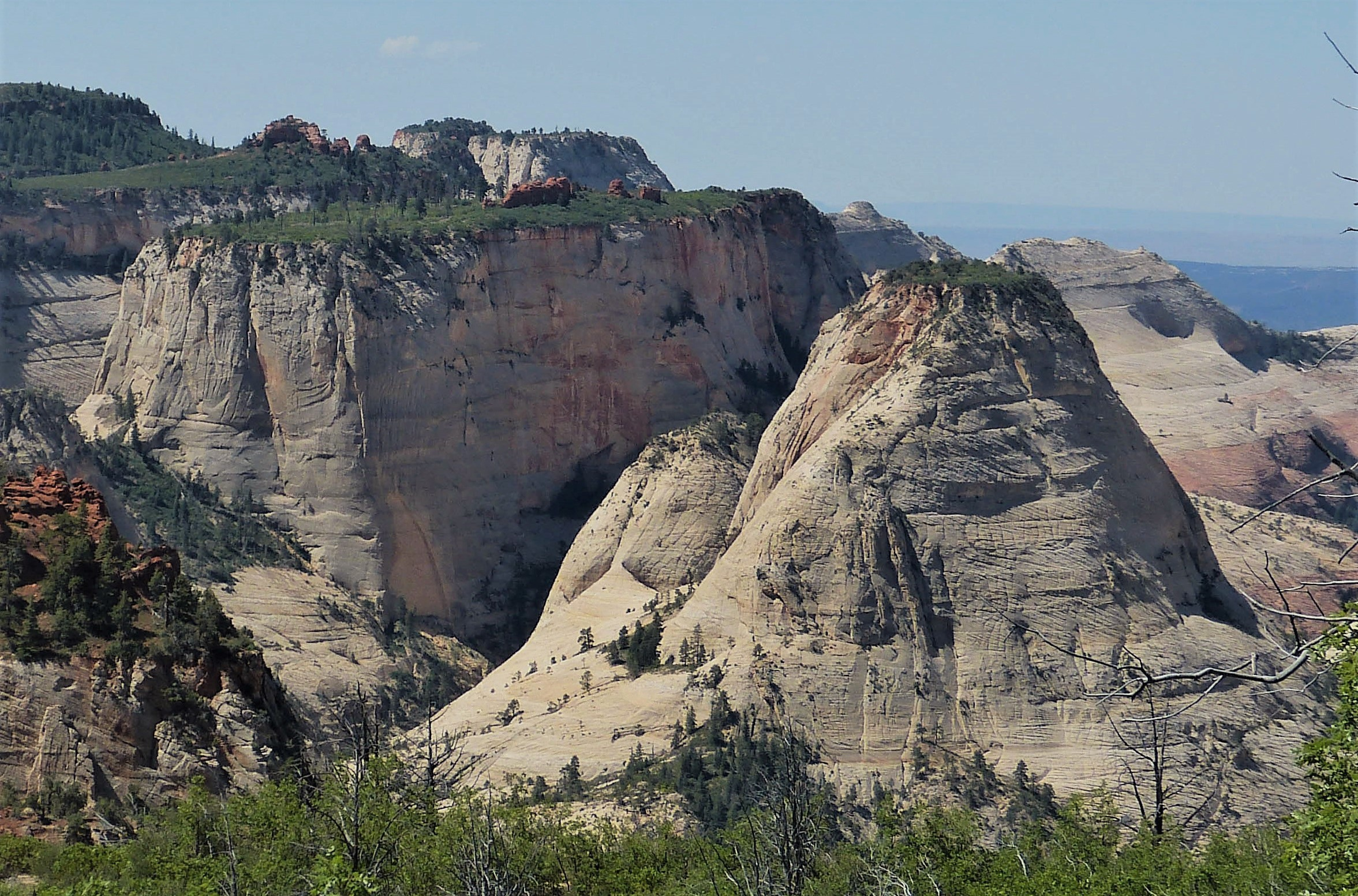
Ivins Mountain (right), Inclined Temple (left)

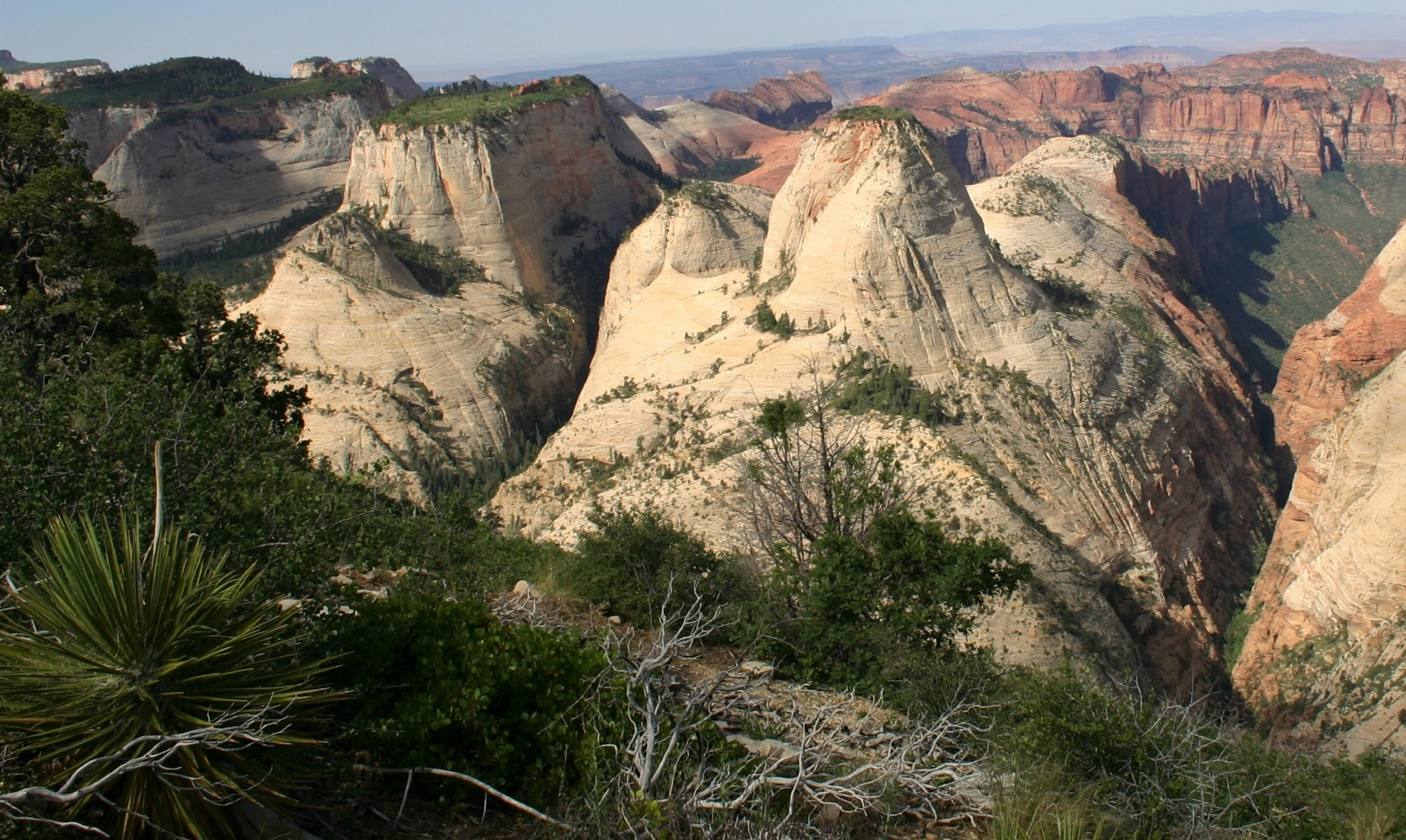
Inclined Temple (left) and Ivins Mountain seen from West Rim Trail

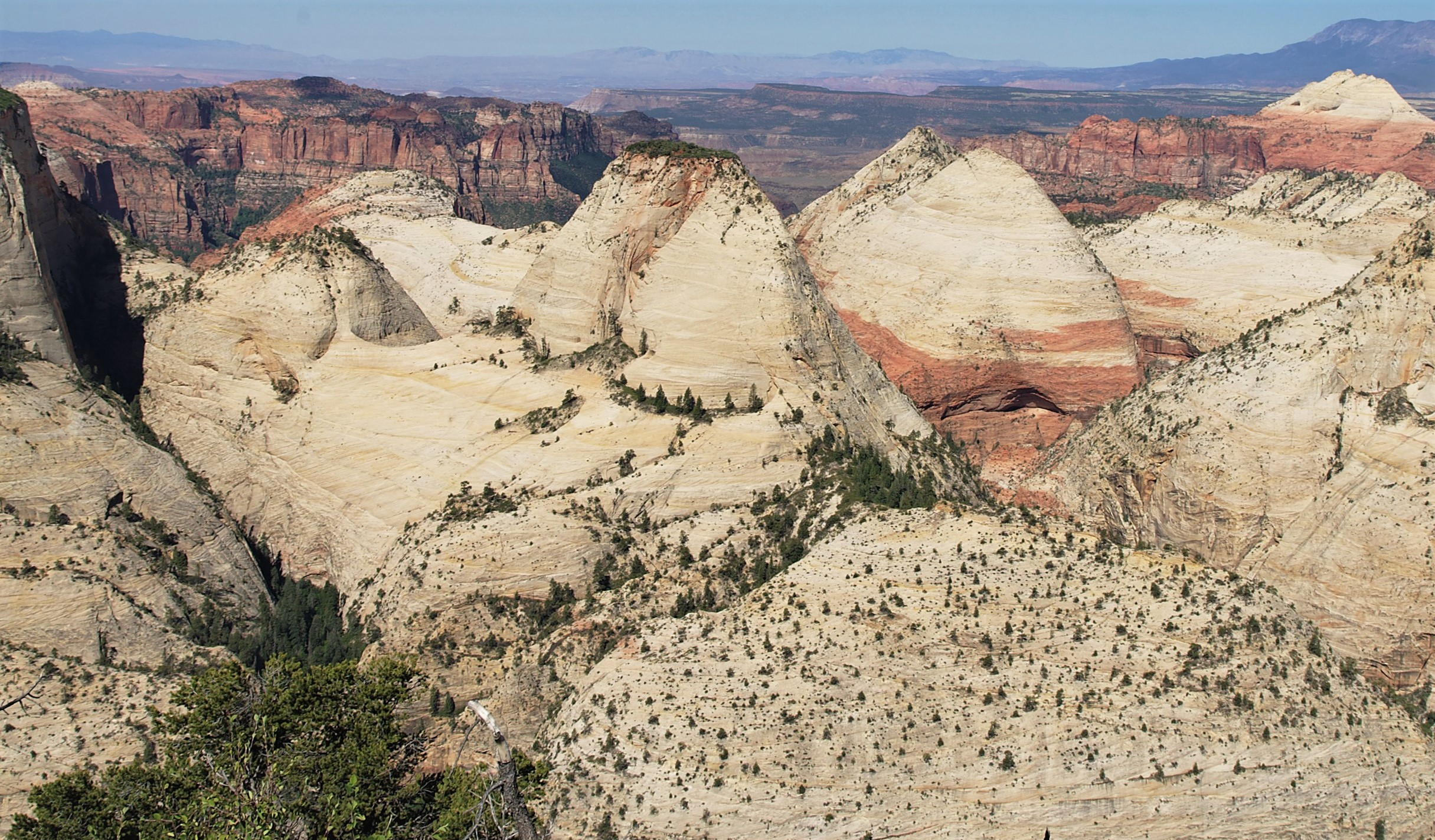
Ivins Mountain centered, South Guardian Angel (upper right)

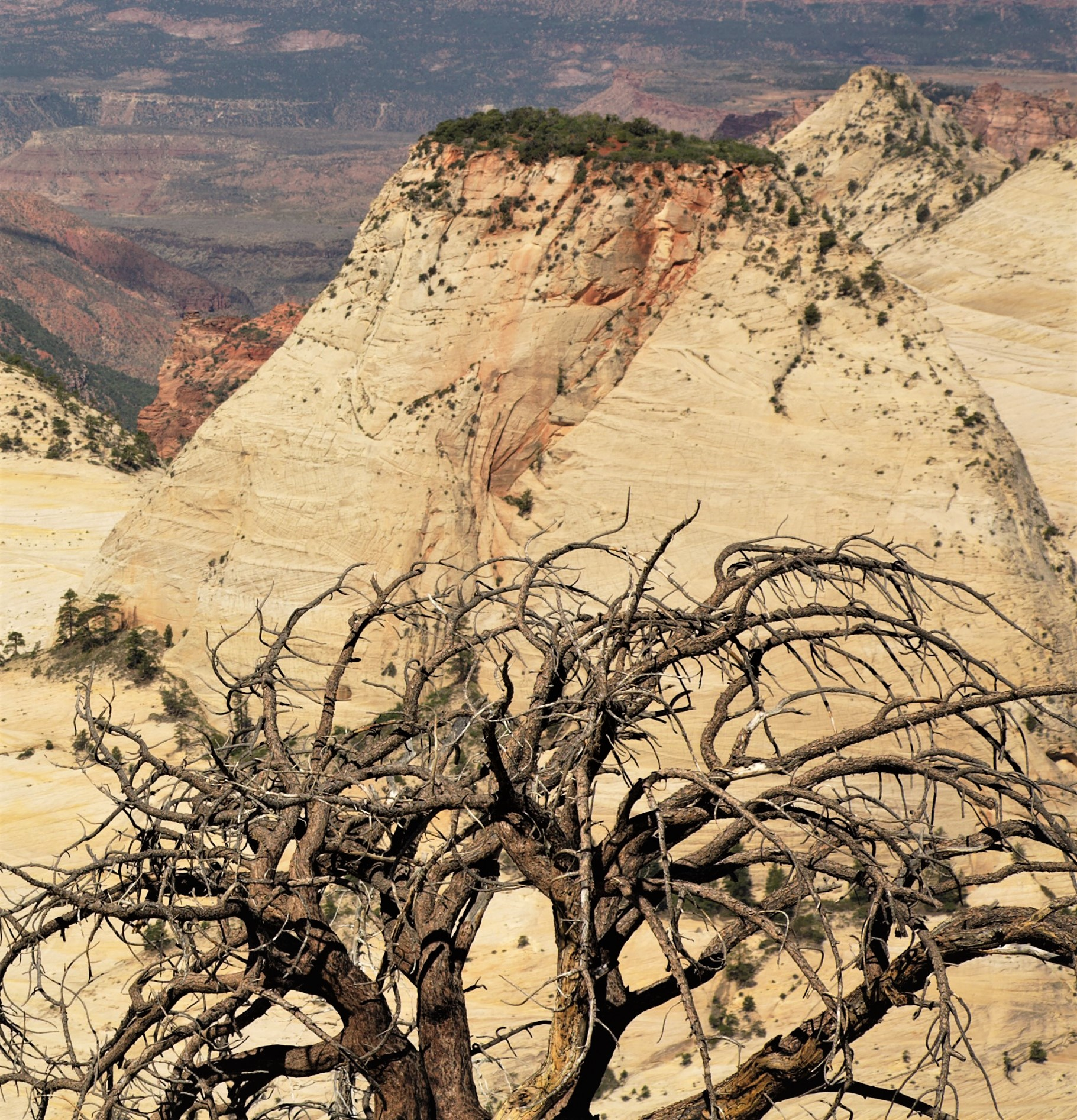
East aspect

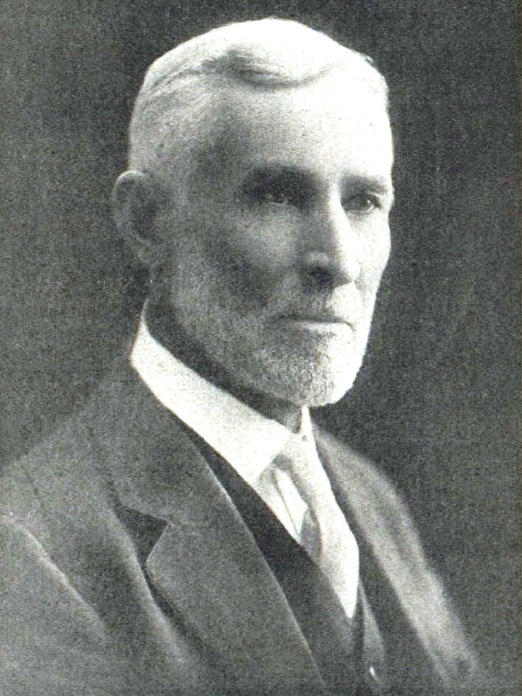
Anthony W. Ivins in 1921

== See also ==
- List of mountains in Utah
- Geology of the Zion and Kolob canyons area
- Colorado Plateau
