= North Creek, Washington =

- Community/Former CDP
- Location of North Creek, Washington
- Coordinates: 47°49′23″N 122°11′54″W
- Country: United States
- State: Washington
- County: Snohomish

Area
  - Total: 13.6 sq mi (35.2 km^{2})
  - Land: 13.6 sq mi (35.2 km^{2})
  - Water: 0 sq mi (0.0 km^{2})
- Elevation: 360 ft (110 m)

Population (2000)
  - Total: 25,742
  - Density: 1,895/sq mi (731.6/km^{2})
- Time zone: UTC-8 (Pacific (PST))
  - Summer (DST): UTC-7 (PDT)
- FIPS code: 53-49665
- GNIS feature ID: 1852953

North Creek is an unincorporated community, formerly a census-designated place (CDP), in Snohomish County, Washington, United States. Part of the community lies within the city limits of Bothell.

In 2010, the North Creek CDP was retired. The southeastern portion went to Maltby, the northeastern portion went to newly formed Clearview, the northern portion went to Martha Lake and newly formed Mill Creek East, and the western portion went to newly formed Bothell West and Bothell East.

North Creek High School is located in the community and opened in the fall of 2017.

== Incorporation ==
On February 2, 1993, a special election was held to consider incorporating the North Creek community into a city. The measure failed 1,341 votes in support to 1,927 votes in opposition. Since that time, the community has grown in population, acting as a bedroom community to the nearby well-established city centers and growing business parks. North Creek remains one of the largest unincorporated communities in the county, despite its large population and commercial core.

== Geography ==
The creek itself is a 12.6-mile-long creek that originates near the Everett Mall and flows southward through Snohomish County and northern King County. The North Creek community is located along the southern portion of North Creek, just north of the creek's mouth at the Sammamish River in Bothell. The community also contains North Creek Park, a county park that features urban wetlands through which the creek flows.
