= D. D. Acholonu =

American gridiron football player (born 1980)

Profile
- Positions: Defensive end, linebacker

Personal information
- Born: October 17, 1980 (age 46); Seattle, Washington, U.S.
- Listed height: 6 ft 2 in (1.88 m)
- Listed weight: 239 lb (108 kg)

Career information
- High school: Inglemoor HS
- College: Washington State

Career history
- 2004: Buffalo Bills*
- 2004: Houston Texans
- 2006: Montreal Alouettes
- * Offseason or practice squad member only

D. D. Acholonu (born October 17, 1980, as Dilibe Chisamaga Acholonu) is an American former professional football defensive end who played for the Montreal Alouettes of the Canadian Football League (CFL). He appeared in 12 games in 2006, recording 26 tackles, two sacks, and one pass deflection.

Fellow Washington State defender Will Derting described Acholonu as such in 2020:

"D.D. (Acholonu) was such a physical specimen, he had god-given talent of athleticism and strength but also quiet. He could just do stuff so easy. Ike (Brown) was the same way as D.D. and Ike was a lot more boisterous in getting guys fired up. You put those guys on either side of you, coming off the edges and that's pretty deadly cause you can't roll either way as a quarterback."
