= Clint McCune =

American musician

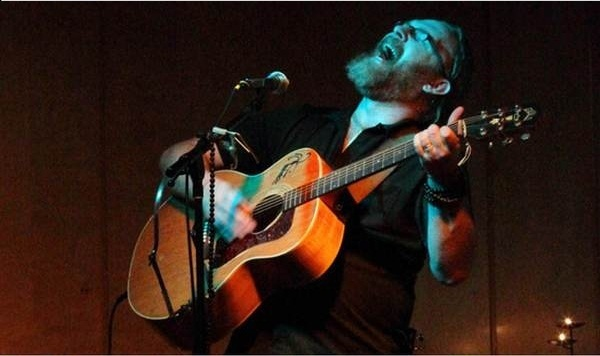
- Clint McCune at SoulFood Books and Cafe in Redmond, Washington.

Background information
- Born: Clinton Edward McCune; April 26, 1973 (age 53); Woodinville, Washington
- Genres: Acoustic, indie folk
- Instruments: Vocalist, acoustic guitar
- Years active: 1986–present
- Formerly of: Twirl, In Like a Lion
- Website: clintmccune.com

Clint McCune (born April 26, 1973) is an American musician and activist in the Puget Sound area.

== Biography ==
McCune is one of three children born to Linda and Don McCune, a Seattle television personality, who is known for his Emmy award winning role as "Captain Puget" (1957–1966), and for writing and narrating the documentary series "Exploration Northwest" (1960–1981) on KOMO-TV in Seattle.

McCune graduated from Woodinville High School in 1991 where he studied theater and music. McCune was the drum major and played the trombone for the school's All-State band.

McCune attended the University of Evansville from 1992–1994 where he studied theater performance. In fall 1992, he spent a semester in Grantham, England at Harlaxton College and toured as a solo musician around the UK. During his time at Evansville, McCune wrote and recorded Dreamtown U.S.A..

McCune's father Don died in March 1993.

In 1999, while living on a sailboat on the intercostal waterways of the eastern seaboard, McCune and his sister Grace formed the band "Twirl". Twirl performed together until 2007 and released two live albums, "Across the Universe", recorded live at Victor's Coffee House in Redmond, and "Hope, Hum, Stomp, Strum", recorded at SoulFood Books and Cafe with violinist Joel Gamble.

From 2005–2013, McCune and his long-time partner, Sara Pelfrey, owned and operated a grassroots-inspired music venue and coffeeshop, SoulFood Books and Cafe, in Redmond, Washington, where he performed on the first Friday of each month. McCune created and hosted a long-running, well-attended monthly community-wide open mic, as well as stewarding a local music scene from this stage.

McCune served three terms on the City of Redmond Arts Commission from 2007-2013 and was appointed chairman in 2010.

In March 2011, McCune performed some of the highest elevation concerts ever in Nepal on the Everest Highway to raise global awareness for climate change. The tour included various Nepali musical artists including Mausami Gurung, Mingma Sherpa, DJ Tenzing, Gambu Sherpa, and Roj Moktan. During his tour in Nepal, McCune was invited to meet with the Prime Minister Jhala Nath Khanal. McCune appears in a book of these events, "Song of Chomolungma: A Musical Journey Along the Everest Highway" by Erika Klimecky.

In 2014, McCune starred in, and composed the soundtrack for, the independent short film, "Brother" directed by Captain Chambers.

On November 13, 2014, McCune was invited to perform the song "Yell Fire" with Michael Franti & Spearhead at The MacDonald Theater in Eugene, Oregon.

== Discography ==
Album title	Year	Tracks	Description
Dreamtown U.S.A.	1994	1. Dreamtown U.S.A.(03:21); 2. Little Girl in the Yellow Dress (03:24 ) 3. Cradle Song (01:56); 4. American Girl (04:07); 5. The Whore (04:45); 6. Remember Me (05:42); 7. Roadside Bar (05:00); 8. Answer This Prayer (03:55); 9. Too Young To Know (03:42); 10. Puzzle Pieces (04:15); 11. River Rolls On (04:32)	Solo release after UK tour
Across The Universe	2003	1. Welcome (04:27); 2. Spun (05:28); 3. Over & Over (03:33); 4. Sleepwalker (04:25); 5. Jezebel (05:35); 6. Saint Teresa (05:50); 7. Dilate (05:16); 8. Air Bends Down (04:38); 9. Shimmer (05:03); 10. Across The Universe (03:59)	Recorded Live @ Victor's Coffee House in Redmond, Washington; Performing as Twirl featuring Grace McCune
Hope Hum Stomp Strum	2006	Disc 1 – October: 1. Lionhearted (06:19); 2. Spent (06:00); 3. Welcome to My Party (05:48); 4. Beloved One (04:29); 5. TWIRL (06:19); 6. The Beginning (06:37); 7. Spun (07:47); 8. Somewhere over America (04:54); Disc 2 – November: 1. Condemnation (03:26); 2. Burn (04:04); 3. Famous Blue Raincoat (05:29); 4. In Your Eyes (06:31); 5. Yell Fire! (06:47); 6. Silver & Gold (08:56); 7. Kelly's Dance/Wicked Game (08:17); 8. Play what you mean what you play (01:44); 9. Hallelujah (08:29)	Recorded Live @SoulFood Books and Café in Redmond, Washington; Performing as Twirl featuring Grace McCune and Joel Gamble
Midnight Sessions	2004	1. Father o Father (00:45); 2. Heartbreak (03:15); 3. Reverie (03:22); 4. Dig Deep (05:00); 5. Backbeat (04:16); 6. Rainsong (04:24)	Recorded in Tillamook, Oregon; Featuring Brent McCune
Home	2008	1. Handshake (06:03); 2. Spun in a Dream (11:22); 3. From Egypt to America (11:10); 4. Comfortably Numb (07:15); 5. Dilate (05:16); 6. The Maker (06:37); 7. Born in the Rain (15:41); 8. Miss Cellie's Blues (04:25)	Recorded Live @SoulFood Books and Café in Redmond, Washington; Featuring cellist virtuoso Ashraf Hakim
Dignity	2010	1. Wild Mountain Honey (06:17); 2. Mental Eclipse (04:54); 3. Real World (04:55); 4. Simple Twist of Fate (05:35); 5. Jolene (05:16); 6. If You Need A Reason (05:00); 7. Come Pick Me Up (04:47); 8. Losing You (04:57); 9. Buckets of Rain (05:45)	Recorded Live @SoulFood Books and Café in Redmond, Washington by John Mower and the Soultribe crew; Featuring Brendan Lake
Brother – Music from the Motion Picture	2013	1. Super Eight (00:49); 2. Devils & Dust (07:21); 3. Mountain Man (04:55); 4. RainSong (03:55); 5. Motherless Child (04:56); 6. Who Do You Love (04:20); 7. Aurora (01:39); 8. Me, Myself & Rye (01:59); 9. Blood Brothers (01:18); 10. Hold Fast (03:43)	Recorded and engineered by Ron Allen; Featuring Dismal Tide
In Like a Lion	2014	1. Follow The Sun (05:55); 2. I am Alive (04:43); 3. Danse Caribe (05:24); 4. Persephone's Champagne (02:52); 5. Drifted (04:26); 6. Wasn't Born To Follow (03:42); 7. Sailor (03:22); 8. Reverie (03:17); 9. Exploring A Patch of Sun (03:15); 10. Let The Light In (05:46)	Recorded and mixed at Wild Pine Studios; Performing as "In Like A Lion" Featuring Betsy Tinney and Angelika Wuerzner
