= Northshore School District =

School district in Washington, US

Address
- 3330 Monte Villa Parkway Bothell, Washington, 98021; United States

District information
- Motto: Strengthening Our Community Through Excellence in Education
- Grades: K-12
- Established: March 2, 1959; 67 years ago
- Superintendent: Justin Irish
- Budget: $181,017,000 (General fund 2009-10)
- NCES District ID: 5305910

Students and staff
- Students: 23,310 (2020-2021)
- Student–teacher ratio: 17.95
- Athletic conference: Kingco Athletic Conference

Other information
- Website: www.nsd.org

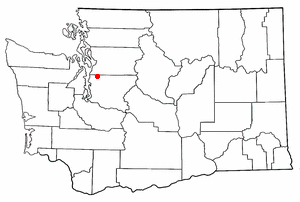
Location of Bothell within Washington

Location of Washington within the United States

The Northshore School District is a public school district covering portions of King County and Snohomish County, Washington. The district's service area covers the cities of Bothell, Brier, Woodinville, and Kenmore as well as portions of unincorporated King and Snohomish Counties.

The district is administered by a school board consisting of five members, each serving a district. Justin Irish was appointed superintendent in July 2025.

The Northshore School District was formed on March 2, 1959, by the consolidation of the Bothell and Woodinville school districts; the consolidation was approved by voters in both districts in a special election on February 24.

In addition, the district was the first in the nation to close due to the Coronavirus outbreak. Bothell High School closed for disinfecting on February 27, 2020, before any other school in the United States had done so.

== Elementary schools ==
- Arrowhead Elementary School
- Canyon Creek Elementary School
- Cottage Lake Elementary School
- Crystal Springs Elementary School
- East Ridge Elementary School
- Fernwood Elementary School
- Frank Love Elementary School
- Hollywood Hill Elementary School
- Kenmore Elementary School
- Kokanee Elementary School
- Lockwood Elementary School
- Maywood Hills Elementary School
- Moorlands Elementary School
- Northshore Family Partnership
- Northshore Online Academy
- Ruby Bridges Elementary School
- Shelton View Elementary School
- Sorenson Early Childhood Center
- Sunrise Elementary School
- Wellington Elementary School
- Westhill Elementary School
- Woodin Elementary School
- Woodmoor Elementary School

== Middle schools (formerly Junior High schools) ==
- Canyon Park Middle School
- Kenmore Middle School
- Leota Middle School
- Northshore Family Partnership
- Northshore Middle School
- Northshore Networks
- Northshore Online Academy
- Skyview Middle School
- Timbercrest Middle School

== High schools ==
- Bothell High School
- Inglemoor High School
- Innovation Lab High School
- North Creek High School
- Northshore Networks
- Northshore Online Academy
- Secondary Academy For Success
- Woodinville High School

== Superintendents ==
- Justin Irish (2025 - Current)
- Michael Tolley (Interim in 2022; 2023 - 2025)
- Michelle Reid (2016 - 2022)
- Larry Francois (2008 - 2016)
- Dolores Gibbons (2007 - 2008)
- Karen A. Forys (1994 - 2007)
- Dennis Ray (1991 - 1994)
- Lee Maxwell (1988 - 1990)
- Frank Love (1981 - 1988)
- Lee Blakely (1973 - 1981)
- Julian Karp (1954 - 1973)
