= North Creek High School =

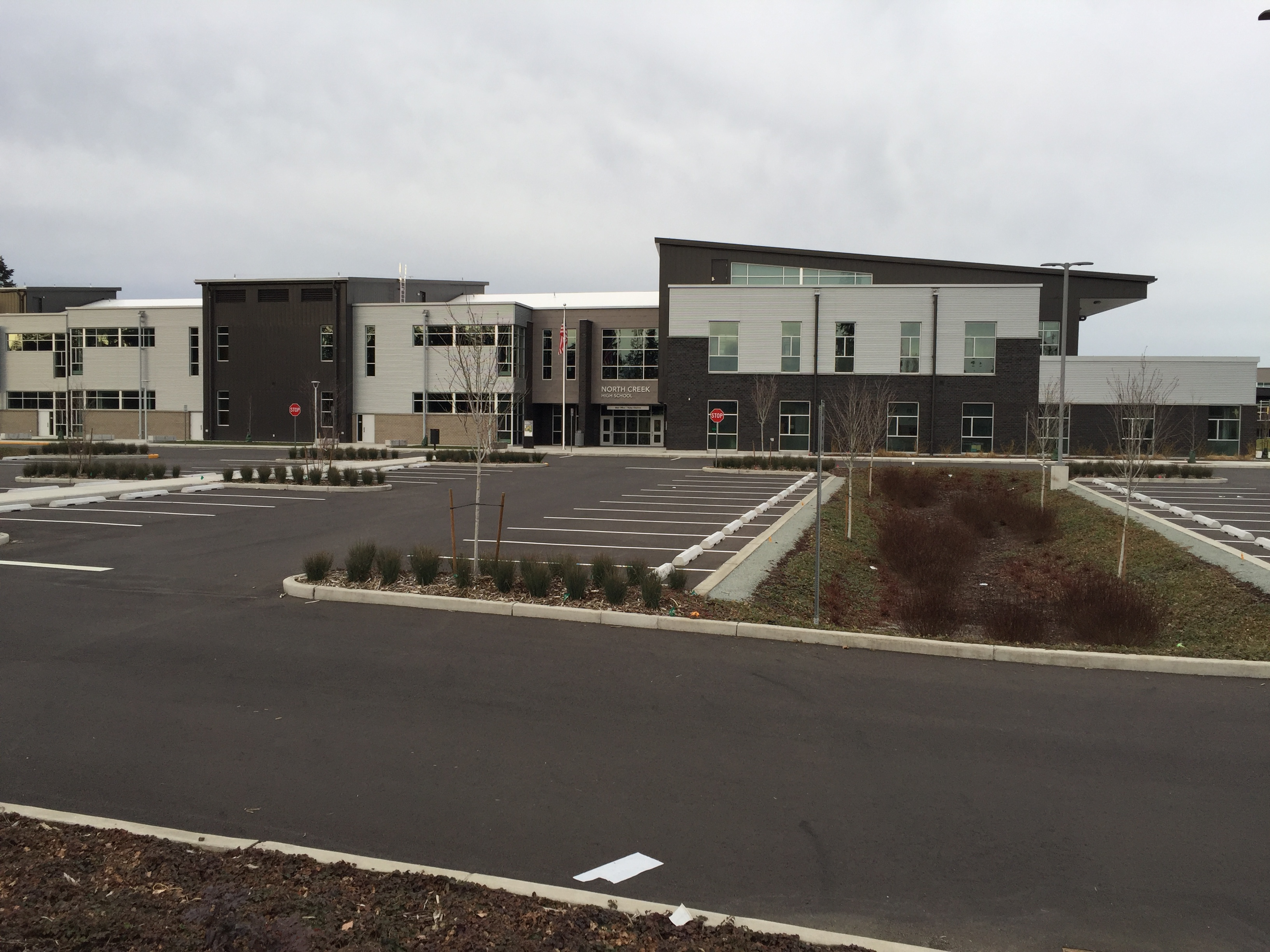

Location
- 3613 191st Pl SE; Bothell, Washington 98012; United States; 47.824137°N 122.182692°W

Information
- Type: Public
- School district: Northshore School District
- Principal: Eric McDowell
- Staff: 90.72 (FTE)
- Grades: 9-12
- Enrollment: 1,917 (2023–2024)
- Student to teacher ratio: 21.13
- Color: Purple Silver Green White
- Mascot: El Jefe (Jaguars)
- Team name: Jaguars
- Rival: Bothell High School
- Website: northcreek.nsd.org

North Creek High School is a public secondary school in Bothell, Washington. It is located in Bothell's North Creek neighborhood. North Creek High School serves grades 9 through 12, in the Northern portion of the Northshore School District.

== Basic information ==
North Creek High School opened for grades 9 through 11 in the fall of 2017. Due to inconvenient boundary changes, seniors were not enrolled until fall of 2018. NCHS is one of four general high schools in Northshore School District, alongside Bothell High School, Woodinville High School and Inglemoor High School. North Creek High School offers Advanced Placement classes as well as many clubs and sports.

== Planning process ==
In 2012, Northshore School District decided they would build a new high school - North Creek High School - Due to overflow and continuous increase of students in the school district. Before NCHS opened, several students and staff members were part of a committee, where they made critical decisions for the school. These decisions include: the mascot and the school colors. Majority of the staff hired at NCHS were from various schools in Northshore school district, with the intention of "creat[ing] a family of teachers from a group of strangers.” Eric McDowell, the principal, had several ideas for NCHS, far before the school opened. These ideas include every student graduating, every student personally knowing at least one staff member, student collaboration, and becoming the best high school in America.

== Design and construction ==
Completed in 2016, North Creek High School was designed by Dykeman Architecture. NCHS began its first academic year fall of 2017. The campus covers 61-acres, with a 250,000-square-foot facility. The school was built with three, two story buildings that included and facilitated STEM classrooms and flexible learning areas. As well, the buildings held a common area, gymnasium, cafeteria, and a performing arts center. Other features of the school include athletic fields, parking, and landscaping as well as wet lands and rain gardens. Construction also featured a wall-to-wall tension grid system and a versatile retractable seating system. The projects main goal was to create a facility with a "deep green" design in order to foster a sustainable school.

The large project required a heavy amount of logging and earthwork activities. With this sustainability goal in mind the school was built using sustainably sourced materials and kept in mind water and energy conservation. Other aspects of the sustainable project included an energy saving geothermal heat recovery system, a site harvested wood program, and 100 kW photo-voltaic array. Additionally, all the trees that were cut down during construction were integrated into the design and construction of the school. Generally speaking, NCHS found many ways to help minimize their carbon footprint. The main buildings have wide hallways with tables, couches, and collaboration cubes. Classrooms have sliding glass walls, that are bullet resistant. NCHS's unique architecture was designed to increase collaboration and group work amongst students - making several spaces on campus suitable for learning.

== Demographics ==
Student enrollment for one random school year was 1,781.

Enrollment by Grade Level	9th	10th	11th	12th
Number of students	484	445	467	385

Enrollment by Race/Ethnicity	American Indian/Alaska Native	Asian	Black	Hispanic	Native Hawaiian/Pacific Islandar	White	Two or More Races/Ethnicities
Number of Students	0	745	45	196	3	633	144

Enrollment by Gender	Male	Female
Number of Students	926	840

== Athletics ==
North Creek High School has a wide variety of sports teams that participate during fall, winter, and spring as well as year-round.

Fall sports offered include crew, cross country, soccer, softball (slow pitch), swim & dive, and volleyball for girls. Boys sports offered include crew, cross country, football, golf, tennis, and water polo

Winter sports offered include basketball, gymnastics, wrestling, and unified bowling for girls. Boys sports offered include basketball, swim & dive, wrestling, and unified bowling.

Spring sports offered include badminton, crew, golf, soft-ball (fast pitch), tennis, track & field, unified soccer, and water polo for girls. Boys sports offered include baseball, crew, lacrosse, soccer, track & field, and unified soccer.

In addition co-ed cheer is offered year round.

== Academics ==
North Creek High School offers a variety of courses and curriculum routes for students.

NCHS offers AP classes, College in the High School programs, Career and Technical Education (CTE) programs and WANIC programs. A variety of different high school level courses are offered, amongst the following departments: biotechnology and engineering STEM, authentic career and college readiness, performing arts, and language courses. Some students may qualify for highly capable services, English Language Learners Program, and running start programs.

Programs include Advanced Placement (AP) programs, Advancement Via Individual Determination (AVID), Career and Technical Education (CTE), WANIC, College in High School (CHS), Running Start, and Special Education. In addition to this, the school offers specified courses for English learners, highly capable services, and departmental electives.

One of the schools stand out courses is the aviation program offered as a CTE course. The school was able to procure a $14,000 Redbird flight simulator for use in the course.

== Activities ==
North Creek High School offers a multitude of activities for its students including clubs, Associated Student Body (ASB), Link Crew, the student store, UpRoar!, and yearbook. There were 65 active clubs for the 2024-2025 school year with more clubs coming to fruition.

Link Crew, one of the actives offered by NCHS, consists of students known as "Link Leaders" who represent the school as older members and welcome new students and incoming freshman to the school by acting as mentors and serving as an outlet for questions and guidance.

The school also contains a student store known as "The Den." The student store is connected to the business course classroom and is run by members of business related classes as well as member of the DECA club. The student store offers drinks, snacks, coffee, apparel and more and is available for students during lunches four out of the five days of weekly classes.

The school also has a literary magazine called "UpRoar!" as well as a yearbook that is put together by the annual staff class and can be purchased by students.
