= Bothell High School =

High school in Washington, USA

Location
- 9130 NE 180th Street; Bothell, Washington 98011; United States; 47.75981°N 122.22070°W

Information
- Type: Public secondary
- Motto: Build. Belong. Become.
- School district: Northshore School District
- Principal: Juan Price
- Teaching staff: 88.54 (FTE)
- Grades: 9-12
- Enrollment: 1,766 (2023–2024)
- Student to teacher ratio: 19.95
- Colors: Royal blue White; Black
- Fight song: "On to Bothell"
- Mascot: Cougar
- Rival: Inglemoor Highschool
- Website: bothell.nsd.org
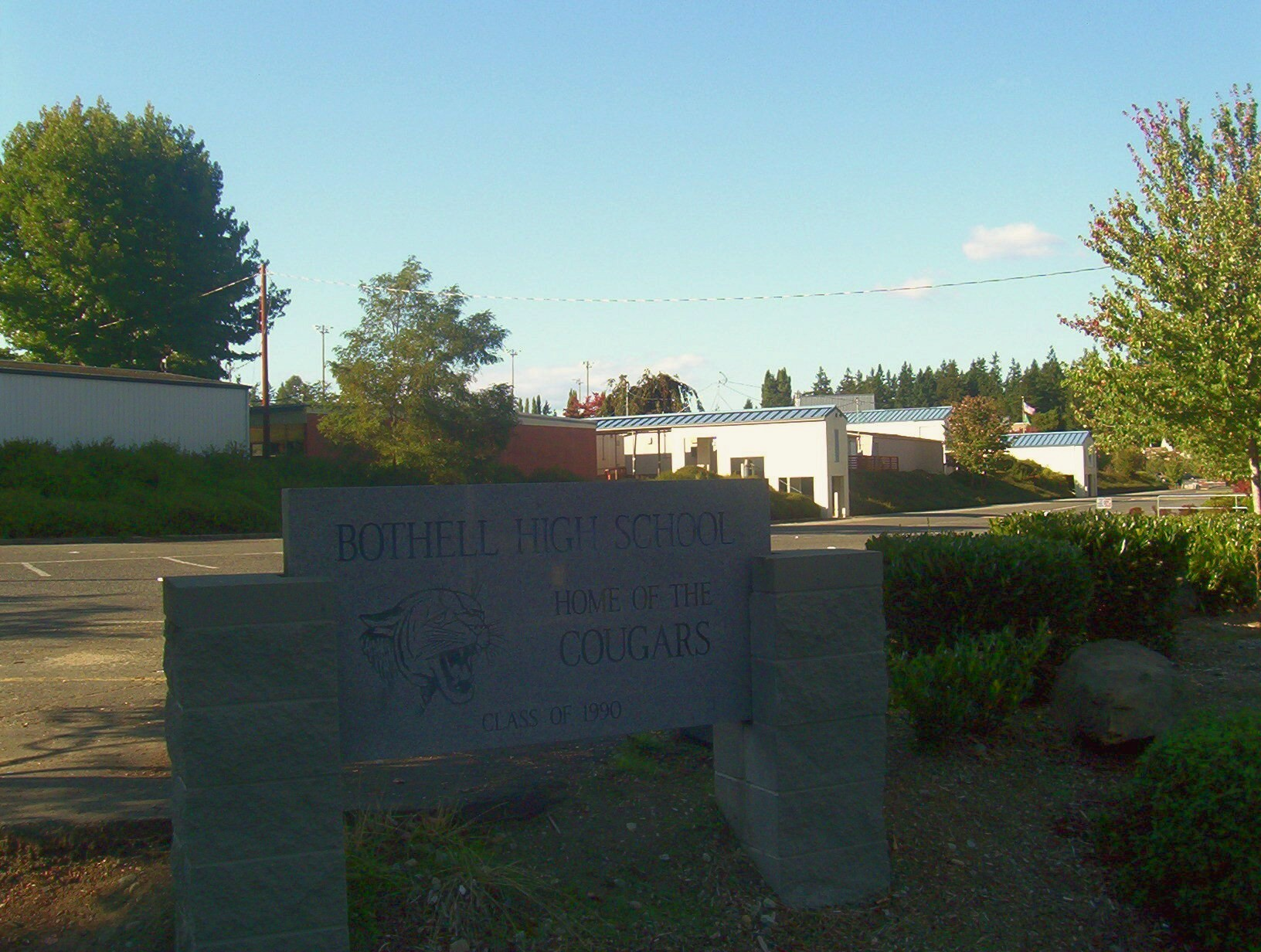
- Bothell High School

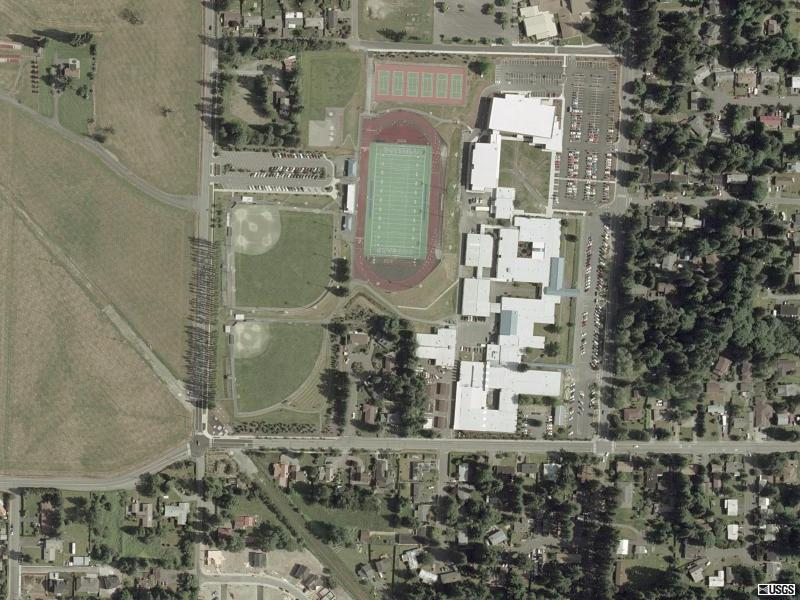
- Urban areas photo from United States Geological Survey

Bothell High School is located in Bothell, Washington, United States, and is one of six high schools in the Northshore School District. Approximately 1,500 students in grades 9 through 12 attend the school, which is a member of the KingCo 4A athletic conference. Its school mascot is the Cougar.

== Science Olympiad ==
The Bothell High School Science Olympiad team placed first in the state competition in 2007, 2008, 2009, 2016 and 2019, thus qualifying to attend the national competition. In 2007, Bothell High placed 28th at Nationals, in 2008 17th, in 2009 15th, in 2016 29th, and in 2019 27th. The Science Olympiad team earned second place at the state tournament in 2010, 2011, 2013, 2014, 2015, 2017, 2018, and 2021.

== Notable alumni ==
- Jon Brower Minnoch '58 - heaviest person ever recorded, weighed 635 kg or 1400 lbs
- Del Bates '58 - major league baseball player for the Philadelphia Phillies
- Gary A. Wegner '63 - astronomer, Professor of Physics and Astronomy at Dartmouth
- Patty Murray '68 - current U.S. Senator, assistant Democratic leader of Senate
- Peter Rinearson ‘72 - Pulitzer Prize winner for Feature Writing 1984, Seattle Times 29,000 word series Making it Fly.
- Rep Porter '89 - professional poker player and 3-time World Series of Poker bracelet winner
- Sean O'Donnell (EPA) '91 - current Inspector General of the U.S. Environmental Protection Agency and previous acting Inspector General of the U.S. Department of Defense
- Bryan Alvarez '93 - professional wrestler, author, and radio show host
- Mark Dugdale '93 - IFBB professional bodybuilder
- John Leonard '93 - plaintiff in Leonard v. Pepsico, commonly known as the Pepsi Points Case
- Chris Walla '93 - singer-songwriter, guitarist, producer, and former member of Death Cab for Cutie
- Layla Angulo '93 - American saxophonist, composer, singer, band director, and recording artist specializing in Latin music
- Shawn Garrett '94 - Emmy-award winning writer, producer
- KJ Sawka '96 - Drummer of Pendulum
- Kyle Cease '96 - actor, comedian, and motivational speaker
- Daniel Sandrin '98 - Korean Basketball League player
- Robert Delong '04 - drummer, singer/songwriter; primary genres include electronica, EDM, and moombahton
- Johnny Hekker '08 - NFL punter for the Carolina Panthers
- Zach LaVine '13 - NBA player, Olympic Gold medalist, All-Star and two-time Slam Dunk Contest champion ('15, '16)
- Ross Bowers '15 - quarterback for the California Golden Bears and the Northern Illinois Huskies
- Jacob Sirmon '18 - quarterback for the Cleveland Browns
- Leon Johnson '19 - wide receiver for the Los Angeles Chargers
