= List of school districts in Washington =

This is a complete list of school districts of in the state of Washington.

School districts are classified as whether they operate high school or not. Additionally the state classifies them on they have at least 2,000 students, with the former being first class districts and the latter being second class districts. Joint school districts have territory in at least two counties. All school districts are counted as independent governments by the U.S. Census Bureau. There are no school systems dependent on other layers of government in Washington State.

== A ==
- Aberdeen School District 5
- Adna School District 226
- Almira School District 17
- Anacortes School District 103
- Arlington School District 16
- Asotin-Anatone School District 420
- Auburn School District 408

== B ==
- Bainbridge Island School District 303
- Battle Ground School District 119
- Bellevue School District 405
- Bellingham School District 501
- Benge School District 122
- Bethel School District 403
- Bickleton School District 203
- Blaine School District 503
- Boistfort School District 234
- Bremerton School District 100-C
- Brewster School District 111
- Bridgeport School District 75
- Brinnon School District 46
- Burlington-Edison School District 100

== C ==
- Camas School District 117
- Cape Flattery School District 401
- Carbonado School District 19
- Cascade School District 228
- Cashmere School District 222
- Castle Rock School District 401
- Centerville School District 215
- Central Kitsap School District 401
- Central Valley School District 356
- Centralia School District 401
- Chehalis School District 302
- Cheney School District 360
- Chewelah School District 36
- Chimacum School District 49
- Clarkston School District 250
- Cle Elum-Roslyn School District 404
- Clover Park School District 400
- Colfax School District 300
- College Place School District 250
- Colton School District 306
- Columbia School District (Stevens) 206
- Columbia School District (Walla Walla) 400
- Colville School District 115
- Concrete School District 11
- Conway Consolidated School District 317
- Cosmopolis School District 99
- Coulee-Hartline School District 151
- Coupeville School District 204
- Crescent School District 313
- Creston School District 73
- Curlew School District 50
- Cusick School District 59

== D ==
- Damman School District 7
- Darrington School District 330
- Davenport School District 207
- Dayton School District 2
- Deer Park School District
- Dieringer School District 343
- Dixie School District (Washington) 101

== E ==
- East Valley School District (Yakima) 90
- East Valley School District (Spokane) 361
- Eastmont School District 206
- Easton School District 28
- Eatonville School District 404
- Edmonds School District 15
- Ellensburg School District 401
- Elma School District 68
- Endicott School District 308
- Entiat School District 127
- Enumclaw School District 216
- Ephrata School District 165
- Evaline School District 36
- Everett School District 2
- Evergreen School District (Clark) 114
- Evergreen School District (Stevens)

== F ==
- Federal Way School District 210
- Ferndale School District 502
- Fife Public Schools 417
- Finley School District 53
- Franklin Pierce School District 402
- Freeman School District 358

== G ==
- Garfield School District 302
- Glenwood School District 401
- Goldendale School District 404
- Grand Coulee Dam School District 301
- Grandview School District 200
- Granger School District 204
- Granite Falls School District 332
- Grapeview School District 54
- Great Northern School District 312
- Green Mountain School District 103
- Griffin School District 324

== H ==
- Harrington School District 204
- Highland School District 203
- Highline School District 401
- Hockinson School District 98
- Hood Canal School District 404
- Hoquiam School District 28

== I ==
- Inchelium School District 70
- Index School District 63
- Issaquah School District 411

== K ==
- Kahlotus School District 56
- Kalama School District 402
- Keller School District 3
- Kelso School District 458
- Kennewick School District 17
- Kent School District 415
- Kettle Falls School District 212
- Kiona-Benton City School District 52
- Kittitas School District 403
- Klickitat School District

== L ==
- La Center School District 101
- LaConner School District 311
- LaCrosse School District
- Lake Chelan School District 129
- Lake Stevens School District 4
- Lake Washington School District 414
- Lakewood School District 306
- Lamont School District 264
- Liberty School District 362
- Lind School District 158
- Longview Public Schools 122
- Loon Lake School District 183
- Lopez School District
- Lyle School District 406
- Lynden School District 504

== M ==
- Mabton School District 120
- Mansfield School District 207
- Manson School District 19
- Mary M Knight School District 311
- Mary Walker School District 207
- Marysville School District 25
- McCleary School District 65
- Mead School District 354
- Medical Lake School District 326
- Mercer Island School District 400
- Meridian School District 505
- Methow Valley School District 350
- Mill A School District 31
- Monroe School District 103
- Montesano School District 66
- Morton School District 214
- Moses Lake School District 161
- Mossyrock School District 206
- Mount Adams School District 209
- Mount Baker School District 507
- Mount Pleasant School District 29
- Mount Vernon School District 320
- Mukilteo School District 6

== N ==
- Naches Valley School District 3
- Napavine School District 14
- Naselle-Grays River Valley School District 155
- Nespelem School District 14
- Newport School District 56
- Nine Mile Falls School District 325
- Nooksack Valley School District 506
- North Beach School District
- North Franklin School District 51
- North Kitsap School District 400
- North Mason School District 403
- North River School District 200
- North Thurston Public Schools 3
- Northport School District 211
- Northshore School District 417

== O ==
- Oak Harbor School District 201
- Oakesdale School District 324
- Oakville School District 400
- Ocean Beach School District 101
- Ocosta School District 172
- Odessa School District 105
- Okanogan School District 105
- Olympia School District 111
- Omak School District 19
- Onalaska School District 300
- Onion Creek School District 30
- Orcas Island School District 137
- Orchard Prairie School District 123
- Orient School District 65
- Orondo School District 13
- Oroville School District 410
- Orting School District 344
- Othello School District 147

== P ==
- Palisdes School District 102
- Palouse School District 301
- Pasco School District 1
- Pateros School District 122
- Paterson School District 50
- Pe Ell School District 301
- Peninsula School District 401
- Pioneer School District 402
- Pomeroy School District 110
- Port Angeles School District 121
- Port Townsend School District 50
- Prescott School District 402
- Prosser School District 116
- Pullman School District 267
- Puyallup School District 3

== Q ==
- Queets-Clearwater School District 20
- Quilcene School District 48
- Quillayute Valley School District 402
- Quinault School District 97
- Quincy School District 144

== R ==
- Rainier School District 307
- Raymond School District 116
- Reardan-Edwall School District 9
- Renton School District 403
- Republic School District 309
- Richland School District 400
- Ridgefield School District 122
- Ritzville School District 160
- Riverside School District 416
- Riverview School District 407
- Rochester School District 401
- Roosevelt School District 403
- Rosalia School District 320
- Royal School District 160

== S ==
- Saint John School District 322
- San Juan Island School District 149
- Satsop School District 104
- Seattle Public Schools 1
- Sedro-Woolley School District 101
- Selah School District 119
- Selkirk School District 70
- Sequim School District 323
- Shaw Island School District 10
- Shelton School District 309
- Shoreline School District 412
- Skamania School District 2
- Skykomish School District 404
- Snohomish School District 201
- Snoqualmie Valley School District 410
- Soap Lake School District 156
- South Bend School District 118
- South Kitsap School District 402
- South Whidbey School District 206
- Southside School District (Washington) 42
- Spokane Public Schools 81
- Sprague School District 8
- Stanwood-Camano Island School District 401
- Star School District 54
- Starbuck School District 35
- Stehekin School District
- Steilacoom Historical School District
- Steptoe School District 304
- Stevenson-Carson School District 303
- Sultan School District
- Summit Valley School District
- Sumner School District 320
- Sunnyside School District 201

== T ==
- Tacoma Public Schools 10
- Taholah School District 77
- Tahoma School District 409
- Tekoa School District 265
- Tenino School District 402
- Thorp School District 400
- Toledo School District 237
- Tonasket School District
- Toppenish School District 202
- Touchet School District 300
- Toutle Lake School District
- Trout Lake School District 400
- Tukwila School District 406
- Tumwater School District 33

== U ==
- Union Gap School District 2
- University Place School District 83

== V ==
- Valley School District 70
- Vancouver School District 37
- Vashon Island School District 402

== W ==
- Wahkiakum School District 200
- Wahluke School District 73
- Waitsburg School District 401
- Walla Walla School District 140
- Wapato School District 207
- Warden School District 146
- Washington School for the Blind ?
- Washington School for the Deaf ?
- Washougal School District 112
- Washtucna School District 109
- Waterville School District 209
- Wellpinit School District 49
- Wenatchee School District 246
- West Valley School District (Spokane) 363
- West Valley School District (Yakima) 208
- White Pass School District 303
- White River School District 416
- White Salmon Valley Schools 405
- Wilbur School District 200
- Willapa Valley School District 160
- Wilson Creek School District 167
- Winlock School District 232
- Wishkah Valley School 117
- Wishram School District 94
- Woodland School District 404

== Y ==
- Yakima School District 7
- Yelm School District

== Z ==
- Zillah School District 205

== See also ==
- Rural school districts in Washington
