= Rural school districts in Washington =

School divisions in Washington, United States

Rural school districts in Washington are administrative districts that provide educational services in rural areas of Washington state.

These are arbitrarily defined as school districts with enrollments of less than 1,000 students and no more than three schools. These rural districts typically serve a small town with a population of up to a few thousand. Some of these districts share educational facilities with neighboring districts.

== Adna School District ==
The town of Adna in Lewis County is served by Adna School District No. 226. As of the 2022-23 school year the district has an enrollment of 648 students and two schools:

- Adna Middle-High School
- Adna Elementary School

References:

- Adna School District No. 226
- School district report card

== Almira School District ==
The town of Almira in Lincoln County is served by Almira School District No. 17. As of the 2022-23 school year the district has an enrollment of 149 students and two schools:

- Almira/Coulee-Hartline High School — This school cooperates with the neighboring Coulee-Hartline School District.
- Almira Elementary School — Grades K-8.

References:

- Almira School District No. 17
- School District Report Card
- Almira Coulee-Hartline Cooperative Page

== Asotin-Anatone School District ==
The city of Asotin in Asotin County is served by Asotin-Anatone School District No. 420. As of the 2022-23 school year the district has an enrollment of 614 students and two schools:

- Asotin Junior-Senior High School
- Asotin Elementary School

References:

- Asotin-Anatone School District No. 420
- School District Report Card

== Benge School District ==
The town of Benge in Adams County is served by Benge School District No. 122. As of the 2021-22 school year the district has one school with an enrollment of 12 students:

- Benge Elementary School

References:

- School District Report Card

== Bickleton School District ==
The town of Bickleton in Klickitat County is served by Bickleton School District No. 203. As of the 2022-23 school year, the district has one school an enrollment of 106 students:

In 1880 the people of Bickleton organized school district No. 210, and built a small box school house. Henry C. Hackley was the first instructor of the twelve pupils- Mrs. Osborne, a widow taught the second term. Mr. Bickle donated an acre of land at the east end of town for another school. The original public hall was converted to the grade school. It served the community until 1897 when it was removed to make room for present, two-story building. The contract was let for $1300. Eight grades were taught, seventy pupils in all, T.C. Anderson was the principal, Miss Jesse Forker was his assistant. On November 10, 1953, the Bickleton community constructed a new $107,645.12 brick school building. The building was built from May 15, 1952, to November 10, 1953. There were seventy-one grade school students attending this beautiful building and there were twenty-four high school students.

As of October 2004 Bickleton School District, which changed to school district No. 203 at some point, had an enrollment of 116 students. After recent developments and investments in both wind and landfill gas sustainable energy projects in the Bickleton area the School Superintendent, Rick Palmer, huddled for two years beginning in 2008 with the county assessor crunching numbers from wind energy developers before going to voters with an $8.9 million bond measure to build the new school. The old 1950s era schools not only lacked adequate HVAC (heating, ventilation and air conditioning) and septic systems but were also outdated as far as structural aspects and energy efficiency.

The School District contracted with Hill International Inc. in Spokane to perform both construction management services and building commissioning services. Mountain States Construction was awarded the contract as the general contractor and ground was broken in 2010 on the new $10.5 million, 42,000-square-foot school building to replace the old Bickleton School District's two 1950s-era schools. The new school building opened in the fall of 2011. As of 2012 the sprawling 500-square-mile rural school district still educates an average of 100 students each year.

- Bickleton School

References:

- Bickleton School District No. 203
- School District Report Card

== Boistfort School District ==
The town of Curtis in Lewis County is served by Boistfort School District No. 234. As of the 2022-23 school year the district has a single school with an enrollment of 86 students:

- Boistfort Elementary School

References:

- School District Report Card

== Brewster School District ==
The town of Brewster in Okanogan County is served by Brewster School District No. 111. As of the 2022-23 school year the district has an enrollment of 1,009 students and four schools:

- Brewster Alternative School
- Brewster Elementary School
- Brewster Middle School
- Brewster High School

References:

- Brewster School District No. 111
- School District Report Card

== Bridgeport School District ==
The town of Bridgeport, Washington, in Douglas County is served by Bridgeport School District 075. As of the 2022-23 school year the district has an enrollment of 778 students and four schools.

- Bridgeport High School
- Aurora High School - a small school facility with an enrollment of 29 students in grades 9–12.
- Bridgeport Middle School
- Bridgeport Elementary

References:

- Bridgeport School District No. 75
- School District Report Card

== Brinnon School District ==
The town of Brinnon in Jefferson County is served by Brinnon School District No. 46. As of the 2022-23 school year the district has a single school with an enrollment of 78 students:

- Brinnon Elementary School

References:

- Brinnon School District No. 46
- School District Report Card

== Cape Flattery School District ==
Cape Flattery School District 401 in Clallam county provides schools for the unincorporated community of Clallam Bay and the town of Neah Bay, located on the Makah Indian reservation. As of the 2022-23 school year the school district had an enrollment of 483 students and four schools:

- Cape Flattery Preschool
- Clallam Bay High & Elementary School
- Neah Bay Elementary School
- Neah Bay Junior/Senior High School

The district also supports the Clallam Bay Correction Center.

References:

- Cape Flattery School District #401
- School District Report Card

== Carbonado School District ==
The town of Carbonado in Pierce County is served by Carbonado School District No. 19. As of the 2022-23 school year the district has a single school with an enrollment of 186 students:

- Carbonado Historic School 19 — Grades K-8.

References:

- Carbonado School District
- District Report Card

== Castle Rock School District ==
The town of Castle Rock in Cowlitz County is served by Castle Rock School District 401. As of the 2022-23 school year the district has an enrollment of 1,507 students and four schools:

- Castle Rock Elementary
- Castle Rock Middle School
- Castle Rock High School
- Castle Rock Virtual Academy

References:

- Castle Rock School District No. 401
- District Report Card

== Centerville School District ==
The unincorporated community of Centerville in Klickitat county is served by Centerville School District No. 215. As of the 2022-23 school year the district has a single school with an enrollment of 97 students.

- Centerville Elementary School — Grades K–8

References:

- Centerville School District at SchoolTree.org.
- District Report Card

== Chewelah School District ==
The city of Chewelah in Lewis County is served by Chewelah School District No. 36. As of the 2022-23 school year the district has an enrollment of 797 students and three schools:

- Gess Elementary
- Jenkins Junior/Senior High
- Quartzite Learning — grades K-12

References:

- Chewelah School District No. 36
- District Report Card

== Colfax School District ==
The town of Colfax in Whitman County is served by Colfax School District No. 300. As of the 2022-23 school year the district has an enrollment of 567 students and two schools.

- Colfax High School, Grades 9–12
- Leonard M Jennings Elementary School, Grades K–8

References:

- Colfax School District No. 300
- District Report Card

== College Place School District ==
The town of College Place in Walla Walla County is served by College Place School District No. 250. As of the 2022-23 school year the district has three schools and an enrollment of 1,571 students.

- John Sager Middle School, grades 6-8
- Davis Elementary School, grades K–5
- College Place High School, grade 9-12

References:

- College Place School District No. 250
- District Report Card

== Colton School District ==
The town of Colton in Whitman County is served by Colton School District No. 306. As of the 2022-23 school year the district has a single public school with an enrollment of 151 students.

- Colton School, grades PK–12.

References:

- District Report Card

== Columbia School District ==
The unincorporated community of Hunters in Stevens County is served by Columbia School District No. 206. As of the 2022-23 school year the district has a single school with an enrollment of 140 students.

- Columbia High and Elementary, grades PK–12.

References:

- Columbia School District No. 206
- District Report Card

== Concrete School District ==
The town of Concrete in Skagit County is served by Concrete School District No. 11. As of the 2022-23 school year the district has three schools with an enrollment of 499 students.

- Concrete Elementary School
- Concrete High School
- Twin Cedars High School

References:

- Concrete School District No. 11
- District Report Card

== Conway School District ==
The census-designated place of Conway in Skagit County is served by Conway School District No. 317. As of the 2022-23 school year the district has one school with an enrollment of 469 students.

- Conway School, grades K–8.

References:

- Conway School District No. 317
- District Report Card

== Cosmopolis School District ==
The city of Cosmopolis in Grays Harbor County is served by Cosmopolis School District 99. As of the 2022-23 school year the district has one school with an enrollment of 169 students.

- Cosmopolis Elementary School

References:

- Cosmopolis School District 99
- District Report Card

== Coulee-Hartline School District ==
The town of Coulee City in Grant County is served by Coulee-Hartline School District No. 151. As of the 2022-23 school year the district has three schools with an enrollment of 179 students. The school district shares a high school with the neighboring Almira School District.

- Almira/Coulee-Hartline High School
- Coulee City Middle School
- Coulee City Elementary School

References:

- Coulee-Hartline School District No. 151
- District Report Card

== Creston School District ==
The town of Creston in Lincoln County is served by Creston School District No. 73. As of May 2013 the total enrollment was 309, and the district has three schools, all co-located in the same building:

- Creston High School
- Creston Middle School
- Creston Elementary School

== Damman School District ==
The Damman School District is located in Kittitas County. It has a single school:

- Damman School — This is a two-room school house that in Ellensburg that offers Kindergarten to grade 5.

References:

- Damman School District
- Damman Elementary School

== Index School District ==
The town of Index in Snohomish County is served by Index School District No. 63. In October 2004, the district had an enrollment of 30 and a single school:

- Index School

References:

- School District Report Card

== Lopez Island School District ==
Lopez Island in San Juan County is served by Lopez Island School Districts No, 144. It has three schools.

- Lopez Elementary School (K-8)
- Lopez Middle/Senior High School (6-12)
- Decatur School (K-8), one of a few "rural and necessary" schools in the state

References:

- Lopez School District No. 144

== Methow Valley School District ==
Twisp and Winthrop in Okanogan County are served by Methow Valley School District No. 350. It has two schools and two alternative learning programs. As of 2024, the district has 772 students.

- Methow Valley Elementary School (K-5)
- Liberty Bell Junior-Senior High School (6-12)
- Independent Learning Center (9-12)
- Responsive Educational Alternative for Children at Home (K-12)

References:

- Methow Valley School District No. 350

== Northport School District ==
The town of Northport in Stevens County is served by Northport School District No. 211. As of May 2013, the district has an enrollment of 291 students and two schools:

- Northport High School
- Northport Elementary School

References:

- Northport School District No. 211
- School District Report Card

== Queets-Clearwater School District ==
The Queets-Clearwater School District No. 20 serves the communities of Clearwater, Queets and Kalaloch. It operates a single K-8 school, Queets Clearwater School, with around 50 students.

References

- Queets-Clearwater School District

== Stehekin School District ==
The Stehekin School District No. 069 serves the village of Stehekin in rural Chelan County. The village is only accessible by boat, ferry, float plane, or by landing at Stehekin State Airfield. Students attend Stehekin School from Kindergarten through grade 8, at which point they continue their education in the Chelan School District, 50 miles down lake. As of May 2013, 13 students were enrolled.

- Stehekin School - a one-room school house serving the Stehekin Valley.

References

- School District Report Card
- History of the Stehekin School District
- Ron Scutt, Teacher SSD- Milken Family Foundation Award Winner 1996

== Onion Creek School District ==
The Onion Creek School District No. 30 in Stevens County was established in 1915 and offers classes from kindergarten to grade 8. In October 2004, the district has an enrollment of 44.

- Onion Creek School — The grounds of this school are notable for having one of the few remaining one-room schoolhouses and teacher cottages in Washington state.

References:

- Onion Creek School District No. 30

== Orient School District ==
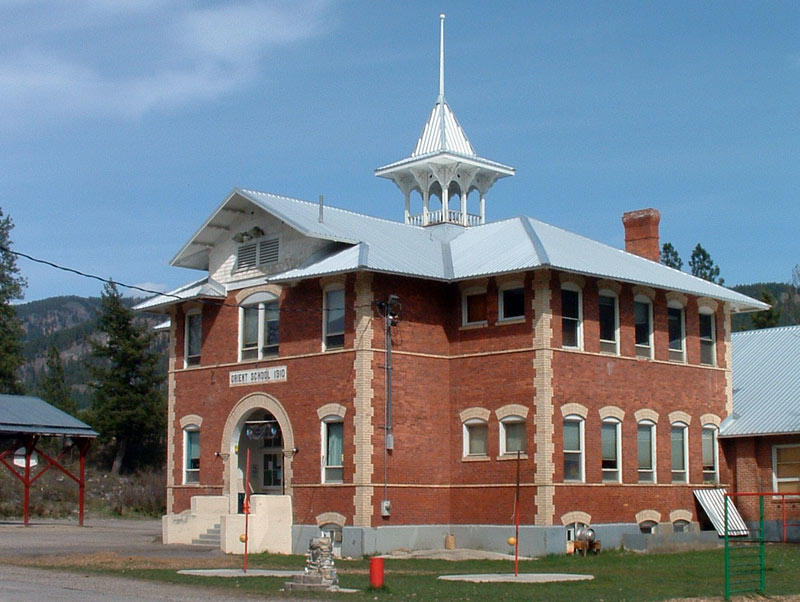
Orient School

The town of Orient in Ferry County is served by Orient School District No. 65. The district offers classes from kindergarten to grade 8. In October 2004, the district has an enrollment of 88 and a single school:

- Orient School — This school building is one of the oldest continuously used schoolhouses in Washington state. It was built in 1910.

References:

- Orient School District No. 65

== Palisades School District ==
The village of Palisades in Douglas County Is served by Palisades School District #102. The district offers education for kindergarten to grade 5. The district is served by Palisades School, a two-room school house with portable buildings on site for additional classrooms. The District also owns the local Grange Hall for use during school functions. Students attend Eastmont School District after grade 5.

== Wahkiakum School District ==
The town of Cathlamet in Wahkiakum County is served by Wahkiakum School District No. 200. As of 2005 the school district had an enrollment of 510 and three schools:

- Julius A. Wendt Elementary
- John C. Thomas Middle School
- Wahkiakum High School — grades 9–12

In 1999 the school board adopted a policy of "Suspicionless Urine Testing" for students. This policy was challenged in the courts by the ACLU.

References:

- greatschools.net
- OSPI
- ACLU of Washington State Challenges Suspicionless Urine Testing for Students

== See also ==
- List of school districts in Washington
