= Emily Warn =

American poet

Emily Warn is an American poet. She was born in San Francisco, grew up in Michigan, and was educated at Kalamazoo College, the University of Washington, and Stanford University. She moved to the Pacific Northwest 1978 to work for North Cascades National Park, and a year later moved to Seattle where she has lived, more or less ever since.

Her essays and poems have appeared in Poetry, Parabola, The Seattle Times, The Kenyon Review, Blackbird, BookForum, The Bloomsbury Review, and The Writer's Almanac.

Her most recent book of poetry, Shadow Architect, was published by Copper Canyon Press in 2008.

She currently divides her time between Seattle and Twisp, Washington.

== Selected works ==
=== Poetry ===
- Shadow Architect (Copper Canyon Press, 2008)
- The Novice Insomniac (Copper Canyon Press, 1996)
- The Leaf Path (Copper Canyon Press, 1982)
