= Bridgeport School District =

School district in Washington, United States

Bridgeport School District No. 75 is a public school district in Douglas County, Washington, USA and serves the town of Bridgeport.

As of the 2022-23 school year, the district has an enrollment of 778 students.

== Schools ==
High schools

- Bridgeport High School
- Bridgeport Aurora High School is a small alternative school with an enrollment of about 29 students in grades 9–12.

Middle school

- Bridgeport Middle School

Elementary school

- Bridgeport Elementary

== See also ==
- Rural school districts in Washington
