= Twisp, Washington =

- Town
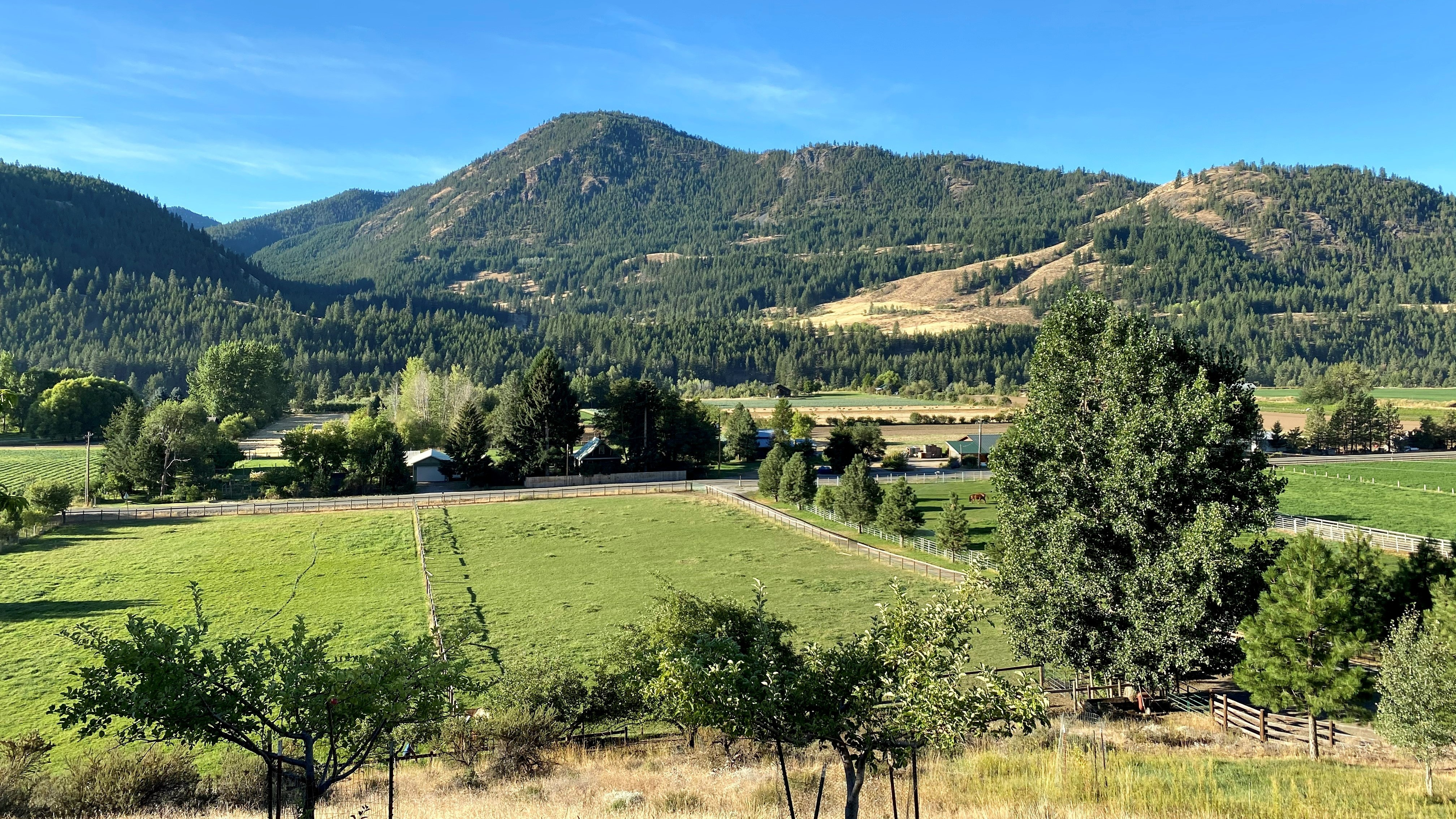
- Twisp River Valley
- Nickname: Heart of the Methow Valley
- Location of Twisp, Washington
- Coordinates: 48°21′48″N 120°07′23″W
- Country: United States
- State: Washington
- County: Okanogan
- Incorporated: August 6, 1909

Government
  - Type: Mayor–council
  - Mayor: Hans Smith
  - Council: Twisp Town Council

Area
  - Total: 1.17 sq mi (3.04 km^{2})
  - Land: 1.17 sq mi (3.03 km^{2})
  - Water: 0.0077 sq mi (0.02 km^{2})
- Elevation: 1,595 ft (486 m)

Population (2020)
  - Total: 992
  - Density: 848/sq mi (327/km^{2})
- Time zone: UTC-8 (Pacific (PST))
  - Summer (DST): UTC-7 (PDT)
- ZIP code: 98856
- Area code: 509
- FIPS code: 53-73080
- GNIS feature ID: 2413408
- Website: Town of Twisp

Twisp is a town in Okanogan County in north central Washington, which sits at the confluence of the Twisp and Methow rivers. The population was 919 at the time of the 2010 census and increased to 992 at the time of the 2020 census.

== History ==
On July 30, 1897, Henry C. Glover platted a town in the Methow Valley he called Gloversville, in which a small store and post office were soon established. In 1898, Glover became postmaster of the town, which was now called Twisp, the origin of which is unclear. The common explanation is that it comes from the Okanagan placename txʷəc'p, which possibly translates to wasp, yellowjacket, or the sound made by a wasp. On June 29, 1899, Amanda P. Burgar platted the town of Twisp adjacent to the original Gloversville site, which was thereafter considered part of Twisp.

Twisp soon contained a population of miners and ranchers who were supported by many local businesses, including a drug store, a bank, a hotel, two saloons and a Methodist church. The Methow tribe was also a common sight, who continued to camp in their traditional sites and traded with the settlers. On August 6, 1909, the town was incorporated and elected its first officers. One of the first issues the five-member town council faced was liquor licenses for the two saloons, and a 1910 election was held to determine whether Twisp would implement Prohibition. The saloons served free drinks on election day, which allegedly all 88 voters partook in, and Prohibition was rejected by a vote of 56–32. In 1911, electricity was brought to Twisp and the first movie house opened. On January 15, 1912, the Twisp School, constructed at a cost of $12,109.68, opened its doors.

Twisp was largely built of wood and shortly after midnight on July 24, 1924, a fire broke out in downtown Twisp, which burned down two houses and 23 buildings. Only the Filer and McAlister grocery store and the Commercial Bank's vault survived within the fire zone, which were both built of red brick.

In 1940, a $50,000 addition to the Twisp School building was completed, which included a library, study hall and gymnasium, and the Twisp High School was relocated to a new wing.

By the early 1940s, logging was a large business in Okanogan County and Ernest and Otto Wagner, a father and son team, owned the second largest operation. After their Okanogan mill burned in 1943, they eventually moved all their operations to Twisp and in 1963 a local newspaper reported that "its payroll [was] the life blood of the biggest per cent of the people, not only of Twisp but of the entire Methow Valley."

In 1948, the Columbia River and its tributaries, including the Twisp and Methow rivers, flooded and the damage in the Methow Valley was estimated to be $4 million, which lost power, telephone service, all its bridges and multiple houses.

The opening of the North Cascades Highway in 1972 brought an influx of full-time resident retirees and seasonal recreationalists, which led to an increase of jobs. In 1973, a new high school located between Twisp and neighboring Winthrop was completed and that year's class was the last to graduate from Twisp High School, which was then abandoned and sat vacant for five years. In 1979, the building reopened as the Methow Valley Community Center.

In 2009, the vacant ranger station in Twisp was converted to a campus (entitled TwispWorks) where local businesses, community organizations, artists and producers could operate.

Twisp, along with several neighboring towns in Okanogan County, was evacuated in August 2015 as a result of the Okanogan Complex Fire. Three firefighters were killed while battling one of the complex's fires near Twisp on August 19.

== Geography ==
According to the United States Census Bureau, the town has a total area of 1.18 square miles (3.06 km^{2}), all of it land.

Twisp is located on the Methow River at its confluence with the Twisp River.

== Demographics ==
Historical population
Census	Pop.	Note	%±
1910	227		—
1920	289		27.3%
1930	335		15.9%
1940	477		42.4%
1950	776		62.7%
1960	750		−3.4%
1970	756		0.8%
1980	911		20.5%
1990	872		−4.3%
2000	938		7.6%
2010	919		−2.0%
2020	992		7.9%
U.S. Decennial Census; 2020 Census

=== 2010 census ===
At the 2010 census there were 919 people, 474 households, and 222 families in the town. The population density was 778.8 inhabitants per square mile (300.7/km^{2}). There were 524 housing units at an average density of 444.1 per square mile (171.5/km^{2}). The racial makeup of the town was 94.6% White, 0.2% African American, 1.2% Native American, 0.5% Asian, 0.4% Pacific Islander, 0.3% from other races, and 2.7% from two or more races. Hispanic or Latino of any race were 3.3%.

Of the 474 households 20.3% had children under the age of 18 living with them, 31.2% were married couples living together, 11.4% had a female householder with no husband present, 4.2% had a male householder with no wife present, and 53.2% were non-families. 46.0% of households were one person and 15.1% were one person aged 65 or older. The average household size was 1.94 and the average family size was 2.72.

The median age in the town was 46.1 years. 17.5% of residents were under the age of 18; 6.7% were between the ages of 18 and 24; 24.3% were from 25 to 44; 33.3% were from 45 to 64; and 18.2% were 65 or older. The gender makeup of the town was 49.6% male and 50.4% female.

=== 2000 census ===
At the 2000 census there were 938 people, 438 households, and 258 families in the town. The population density was 807.9 people per square mile (312.2/km^{2}). There were 505 housing units at an average density of 434.9 per square mile (168.1/km^{2}). The racial makeup of the town was 96.16% White, 0.96% Native American, 0.53% Asian, 0.75% from other races, and 1.60% from two or more races. Hispanic or Latino of any race were 2.77%.

Of the 438 households 29.9% had children under the age of 18 living with them, 39.5% were married couples living together, 16.0% had a female householder with no husband present, and 40.9% were non-families. 34.7% of households were one person and 14.6% were one person aged 65 or older. The average household size was 2.13 and the average family size was 2.70.

The age distribution was 24.2% under the age of 18, 5.3% from 18 to 24, 26.8% from 25 to 44, 26.7% from 45 to 64, and 17.1% 65 or older. The median age was 42 years. For every 100 females, there were 86.1 males. For every 100 females age 18 and over, there were 84.2 males.

The median household income was $26,354 and the median family income was $31,944. Males had a median income of $26,250 versus $17,857 for females. The per capita income for the town was $16,257. About 14.6% of families and 19.8% of the population were below the poverty line, including 27.3% of those under age 18 and 8.2% of those age 65 or over.

== Government and politics ==
The Town of Twisp's mayor-council government system comprises a mayor and the five-member Twisp Town Council, with Hans Smith serving as mayor since 2024. Twisp is located within Okanogan County in Washington's 4th congressional district, represented by Republican Dan Newhouse, who was sworn in on January 3, 2015.

== Education ==
The Town of Twisp is served by the Methow Valley School District, which includes Methow Valley Elementary and Liberty Bell Junior-Senior High School, both of which are located midway between Twisp and neighboring Winthrop. The Independent Learning Center, an alternative high school, is located in Twisp.

== Notable people ==
- Jake Muxworthy, actor
- Danbert Nobacon, British musician
- Stella Stevens, actress
- Lynx Vilden, British survivalist
- Emily Warn, poet
