= Newport Miner =

Mid-week newspaper from Newport, Washington, USA

- Type: Weekly newspaper
- Owner(s): J. Louis Mullen; Michelle Nedved
- Founder: M. P. Stephans
- Founded: 1897 (as the Newport Pilot)
- Language: English
- Circulation: 1,700 (as of 2022)
- ISSN: 0892-6239
- OCLC number: 15248685
- Website: pendoreillerivervalley.com

The Newport Miner is a weekly newspaper published Wednesdays in Newport, Washington, United States. It covers Newport and the surrounding communities of the Pend Oreille River valley and Pend Oreille County in the U.S. state of Washington and Bonner County in the state of Idaho.

== History ==
In 1897, M. P. Stephans founded the Newport Pilot. Stephans was previously the editor of the Hillyard Headlight. He sold the Pilot in April 1899, and then purchased a new printing outfit to set up Juliaetta, Idaho. The new publisher was the Pilot Publishing Co., who changed the paper's name to the Newport Minor in May 1889. At other points the paper was called the Priest River Pilot and Newport News. The Miner suspended publication in September 1899. Brothers Warren E. and Charles M. Talmadge took over the printing plant in Newport and restarted the Newport Miner.

Fred L. Wolf acquired the paper from the Talmadge family in 1907 and ran it for 35 years. Because of his efforts, the Miner had an outsized influence in the early 20th century. Wolf was elected to the Washington State Legislature with a strong majority in 1918. As publisher, he championed the Good Roads Movement, the creation of Pend Oreille County and construction of the Claiborne Pell Newport Bridge. Wolf sold the paper in 1945 to Freeman S. Frost. Two decades later Frost sold the paper in 1964 to Gerald Carpenter, followed by Jim Hubbard in 1977 and then Fred Willenbrock in 1986. Fred and Susan Willenbrock sold the paper in 2015 to J. Louis Mullen, whose brother's own Mullen Newspaper Company.
