= Newport, Washington =

City in Washington, United States

- City
- Interactive location map of Newport
- Coordinates: 48°10′42″N 117°03′17″W
- Country: United States
- State: Washington
- County: Pend Oreille

Government
  - Type: Mayor–council
  - Mayor: Keith Campbell

Area
  - Total: 1.47 sq mi (3.80 km^{2})
  - Land: 1.47 sq mi (3.80 km^{2})
  - Water: 0 sq mi (0.00 km^{2})
- Elevation: 2,159 ft (658 m)

Population (2020)
  - Total: 2,114
  - Density: 1,440/sq mi (556/km^{2})
- Time zone: UTC−8 (Pacific (PST))
  - Summer (DST): UTC−7 (PDT)
- ZIP code: 99156
- Area code: 509
- FIPS code: 53-48820
- GNIS feature ID: 2411249
- Website: City of Newport

Newport is a city in and the county seat of Pend Oreille County, Washington, United States. The population was 2,114 at the 2020 census.

== History ==
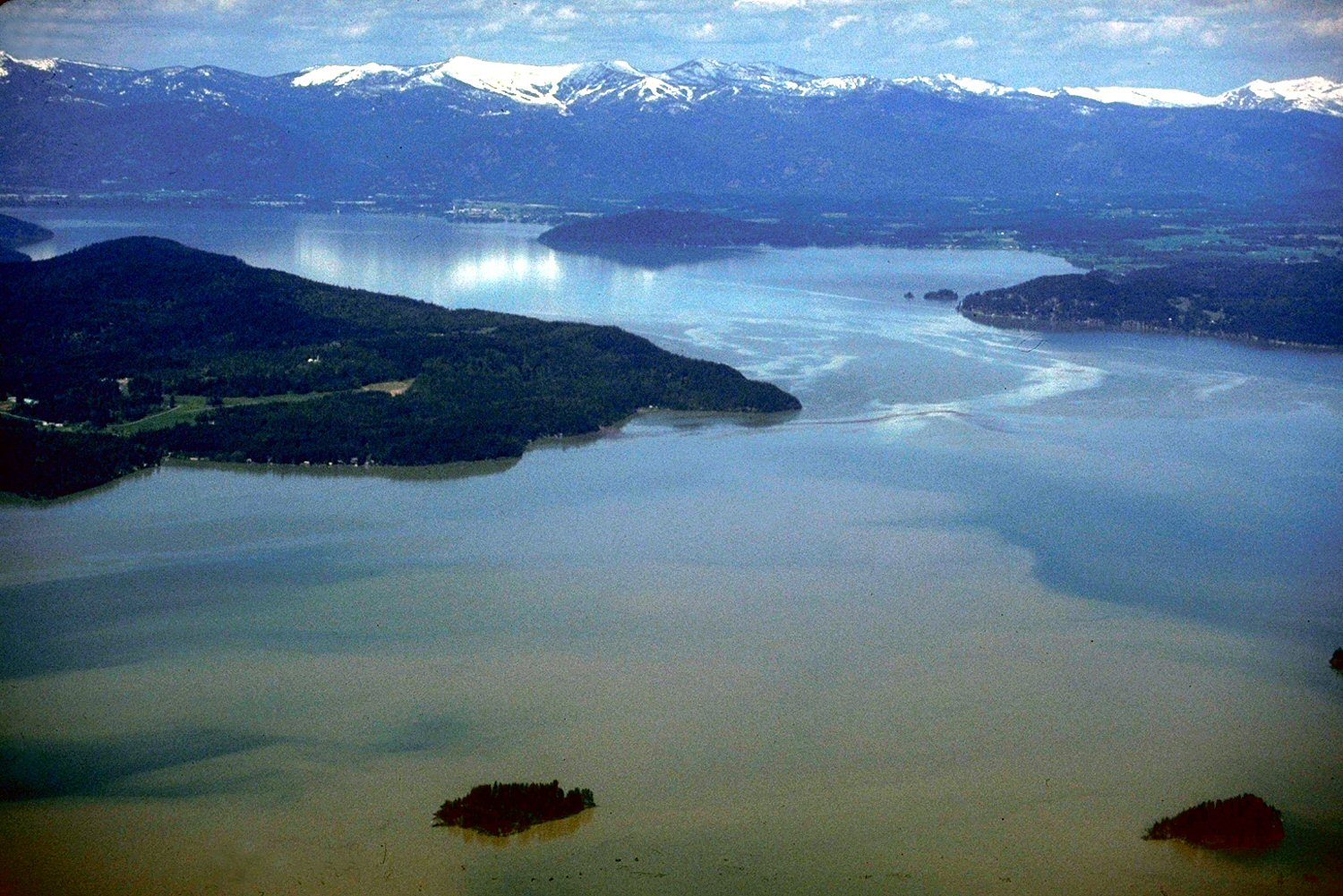
Lake Pend Oreille, part of the traditional Kalispel homeland

=== Indigenous peoples and early exploration ===
The area around present-day Newport, Washington, has been inhabited for thousands of years and is part of the traditional homeland of the Kalispel people. The Pend Oreille River provided transportation and access to fish and other resources, while the surrounding forests supported Indigenous communities long before European-American settlement. In 1809 and 1810, fur trader and explorer David Thompson traveled through the region while working for the North West Company. His expeditions helped establish routes for the fur trade across the Inland Northwest. During the 1850s, surveys commissioned by Washington Territory Governor Isaac Stevens documented the region's terrain, timber resources, and potential transportation routes. These surveys increased outside knowledge of the area as interest in settlement and commercial development grew.

=== River port and the beginnings of Newport ===
The settlement that became Newport developed around river transportation and trade in the Pend Oreille River valley. The original settlement of Newport was located on the Idaho side of the river, in what is now Oldtown, Idaho. By the late 1880s, the settlement had begun serving travelers and settlers moving into the region. Businesses included a general store, a restaurant, a hotel, and a saloon, while a post office provided mail service to the surrounding area.

Steamboats became an important means of transportation along the river. The first steamboat serving the Pend Oreille River was assembled near Sandpoint, Idaho, and launched in 1888. By the late 1890s, competing steamboat companies carried passengers and freight between Newport and settlements farther north, including Metaline and Metaline Falls. Rapids at Box Canyon made navigation difficult, and travelers and cargo sometimes had to be transferred around the rapids.

The arrival of the Great Northern Railway in 1892 changed the area's transportation and commercial prospects. The railroad connected the region to a larger rail network, allowing goods to move more easily to outside markets. Timber and other products could be transported by rail, while steamboats continued to serve communities along the river. The original Idaho settlement and the newer Washington settlement gradually developed separate identities. The Washington community became the principal town known as Newport, while the original settlement became known as Oldtown.

=== Settlement and incorporation ===
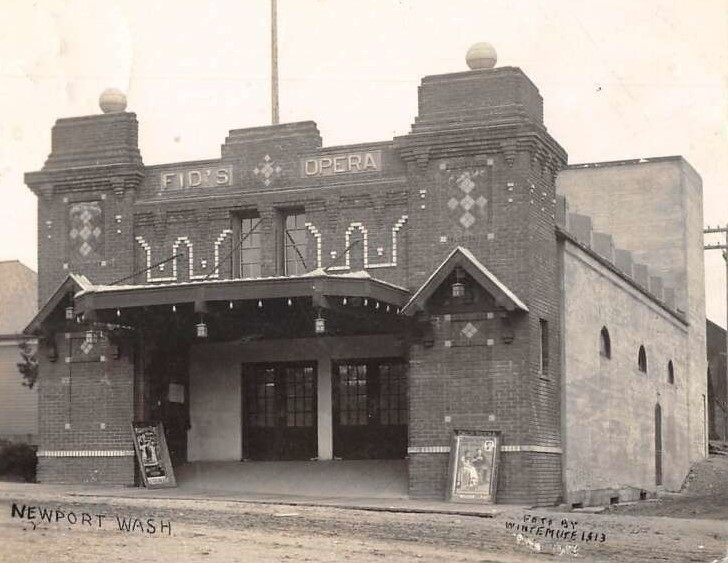
Newport, Washington seen in a real photo postcard mailed on October 7, 1913

In 1895, brothers Charles and Warren E. Talmadge acquired land on the Washington side of the river and established the Newport Washington Land Company. They laid out a townsite that attracted residents and businesses seeking access to the railroad and the surrounding region's developing economy. The availability of transportation helped Newport grow as a commercial center for the Pend Oreille River valley.

The location of the area's post office became an issue as more people settled on the Washington side. The post office had originally served the Idaho settlement, but the population increasingly shifted toward the newer community. By 1901, Newport, Washington, had more than 200 residents. The post office was subsequently moved to the Washington settlement by order of the United States Postmaster General at the time, Charles Emory Smith, further establishing the distinction between Newport and Oldtown.

Newport was incorporated as a fourth-class town on April 13, 1903. Tom J. Kelly became its first mayor, and the first Town Council meeting took place on April 20 in the office of the Newport Miner newspaper. Incorporation gave the growing settlement a municipal government responsible for local administration and services.

The town's early businesses included general stores, hotels, restaurants, blacksmith shops, hardware stores, and livery stables. These establishments served railroad passengers, workers, farmers, and settlers arriving in the region. Commercial buildings constructed during this period included the Newport Trading Company building in 1903 and the T. J. Kelly Building in 1906. As the population grew, the town added schools, utilities, and public buildings. A city hall was completed in 1914.

Newport changed from a town to a city on January 7, 1970.

=== Timber industry and regional commerce ===
Timber became one of the main industries in and around Newport during the early 20th century. The surrounding forests supplied logs for sawmills and lumber companies, and the resulting products were shipped to markets elsewhere in the region. Logging also provided employment for workers who purchased supplies, rented rooms, and used other services in Newport.

Several lumber companies operated in the area, including Standard Lumber, Ashenfelter, and Fidelity Lumber. The Diamond Match Company also became a major employer. Its operations were part of a broader timber economy that produced lumber, shingles, cedar posts, poles, railroad ties, and cordwood. Some timber was used locally, while other products were shipped by rail or river. Cordwood was particularly important during the period when steamboats and locomotives relied on wood for fuel.

The Idaho and Washington Northern Railroad reached Newport in 1907. The line later extended north toward Metaline Falls, where it served mining and industrial operations. It carried lumber from Pend Oreille County, cement products from Metaline Falls, and ores from regional mines. These connections allowed businesses in the valley to reach markets beyond northeastern Washington.

The Milwaukee Railroad took control of the route between Newport and Metaline Falls in 1914. Railroad ownership continued until 1979, when the Port of Pend Oreille took over the line. The port continued operating the railroad for freight transportation, preserving a connection to the region's industrial past while providing a transportation option for businesses.

Agriculture also contributed to Newport's economy. Farms throughout the valley produced dairy products and other agricultural goods, and the city's stores and commercial services supplied surrounding rural communities. Timber, farming, transportation, and retail trade together supported Newport's growth as a regional business center.

=== County seat and transportation hub ===
Pend Oreille County was established in 1911 from the eastern portion of Stevens County. Newport was initially designated the temporary county seat, and the new county government began operating that year. The creation of the county brought a need for permanent government offices and a central location for public business.

Newport competed with Cusick, Usk, and Ione for the permanent county seat. In a 1912 vote, Newport won the designation. Its existing commercial district, population, and railroad connections helped make it a practical location for county government. The decision brought court proceedings, administrative offices, and other government activities to the city.

The Pend Oreille County Courthouse was completed in 1915. It became one of Newport's principal public buildings and remains an important part of the city's history. The courthouse was restored and refurbished in 1992, preserving the building for continued use and recognizing its historical significance.

Newport grew rapidly during its early years. Historical accounts place its population at about 800 in 1906 and 1,199 in 1909. The town's businesses included stores, restaurants, hardware shops, lumber operations, and other services that catered to residents throughout the county. Its position as the county seat helped maintain a steady flow of people visiting for legal proceedings, government business, shopping, and other services.

By the early 20th century, Newport had become one of the principal commercial and administrative centers of northeastern Washington. Its railroad connections and location near the Idaho border linked it with communities across the region, while county government gave the city a role that extended beyond its own population.

=== Roads, bridges, and public infrastructure ===
During the early 20th century, automobile travel gradually became more important in the Newport area. Roads provided connections between settlements that had previously depended heavily on riverboats and railroads, but travel could be difficult on rough roads through the mountainous terrain. Better roads and a bridge across the Pend Oreille River became important priorities for residents and businesses on both sides of the Washington-Idaho border.

Newport newspaper editor Fred L. Wolf supported improved roads and campaigned for a bridge across the river. A proposed bridge was vetoed by Governor Ernest Lister in 1913, but the project remained a local concern. A bridge near Newport eventually opened to traffic on June 15, 1927. It improved automobile and truck travel between northeastern Washington and northern Idaho, making it easier for residents and businesses to cross the river. The original crossing was replaced in 1989.

Public utilities also expanded as the town grew. In 1905, a water company was organized to bring water from Kellogg Springs in Idaho to Newport. Electrical service followed in 1909, after earlier difficulties with unreliable power. The development of dependable electricity supported homes, street lighting, businesses, and industrial facilities. In 1936, the Pend Oreille County Public Utility District became Newport's electricity supplier.

Schools expanded alongside the town's population. A school district had been established in 1892, and early classes were held in small wooden buildings. A two-story school opened in 1904, followed by a brick school building in 1914. A larger high school opened in 1936, and a new elementary school followed in 1953. Newport's present high school building opened on September 8, 1981. The successive school buildings reflected the community's changing needs and the importance of education to Newport and surrounding rural areas.

=== The Great Fire of 1910 and regional disasters ===
The 1910 fire season brought widespread destruction to forests and communities across the Inland Northwest. Newport was surrounded by heavily forested land, and the timber industry was central to the local economy. Large fires threatened homes, timber operations, transportation routes, and the livelihoods of people living throughout the region.

Newport residents took part in firefighting and evacuation efforts. Physician John Thomas Phillips and automobile owner Charles P. Moeser Sr. used their vehicles to transport firefighters and assist people threatened by the fires. Phillips, who had arrived in Newport in 1900, was known for traveling throughout the surrounding countryside to treat patients. Accounts of the fire describe the efforts of local residents who helped protect their neighbors and the community's property.

Flooding was another recurring problem along the Pend Oreille River. The 1948 regional flood inundated low-lying communities throughout the Northwest, including parts of the Newport area. Flooding damaged property and demonstrated the risks faced by settlements along the river.

Plans for a dam at Albeni Falls, upstream from Newport in Idaho, gained support in part because of concerns about flooding and the potential for hydroelectric power. Local advocates, including Fred L. Wolf, supported the project. The Albeni Falls Dam, built by the United States Army Corps of Engineers, was completed in 1955. It became part of the region's flood-management and hydroelectric systems, although river levels and weather continued to affect communities along the Pend Oreille River.

Severe winter weather also affected local infrastructure. During the winter of 1968–1969, heavy snow collapsed an airport hangar and destroyed most of the aircraft inside.

=== The George Conniff murder case ===
On September 14, 1935, Newport City Marshal George Conniff was fatally shot while investigating a burglary at the Newport Creamery. The killing became one of the area's best-known criminal cases. Despite the initial investigation, no one was successfully prosecuted for the murder, and the case remained unresolved for decades.

In the late 1980s, Pend Oreille County Sheriff Tony Bamonte reopened the investigation. The renewed inquiry examined evidence from the original case and sought to establish what had happened on the night of the killing. In 1989, a weapon believed to have been used in the murder was recovered from the Spokane River near the Post Street Bridge. The investigation identified Clyde Willis Ralstin, a Spokane police officer, as the gunman, but he was never brought to justice for Conniff's death.

Journalist Timothy Egan later examined the case in his 1992 nonfiction book Breaking Blue. The book described the murder, the failures of the original investigation, and the efforts to uncover the truth decades later. It brought national attention to Newport and the case, which became known for its unanswered questions and allegations of misconduct involving law enforcement.

The Conniff murder remains a notable episode in Newport's history. The case drew attention to the difficulties of investigating a decades-old crime and the consequences of an investigation that failed to produce a conviction.

=== Community landmarks and tourism ===
Newport has preserved several landmarks associated with its early commercial and industrial development. One of the best known is the Corliss steam engine and flywheel known as the Big Wheel. The engine was associated with the former Diamond Match Company sawmill at Albeni Falls and represents the machinery used in the region's timber industry. In 1965, Washington Governor Daniel J. Evans formally dedicated the engine to the city, making it a prominent local landmark.

Newport, 1950's

Several historic commercial buildings also survive from Newport's early years. The Newport Trading Company building, constructed in 1903, and the T. J. Kelly Building, constructed in 1906, are examples of buildings associated with the town's early commercial district. The former Great Northern Railway depot, built in 1910, later became associated with the Stimson Lumber Company. These buildings reflect the growth of a town that served railroad passengers, timber workers, farmers, and other residents of the surrounding region.

Newport also had entertainment venues during its early development. Charles A. Fiedler built a larger concrete opera house in 1911, known as Fid's Opera, after an earlier opera house had served as a school and entertainment venue. The new building seated about 400 people and hosted theatrical productions and other events. It struggled financially and entered foreclosure in 1919, reflecting the challenges of maintaining a large entertainment venue in a small rural community.

In 1987, Newport began a tourism campaign promoting itself as the "City of Flags." The campaign involved displaying hundreds of flags around the city. It was discontinued during the 1990s because of theft and maintenance problems, but the name became part of Newport's tourism history.

The Pend Oreille County Historical Society also developed facilities to preserve the region's history. A visitor center opened in 1995 on land leased from the society. The museum complex includes historic log cabins, farming and logging equipment, a replica logging-camp bunkhouse, a railroad caboose, and other artifacts connected with settlement and industry in the region. The Big Wheel is among the site's principal attractions.

The Stuart B. Bradley Memorial Building, completed in 1994, provides space for research and community activities. Local historical organizations have continued to collect records and artifacts documenting Newport and Pend Oreille County. Their work has helped preserve material about the area's early industries, transportation, public institutions, and residents.

Newport also made improvements to its downtown during the late 20th century. A revitalization project launched in 1998 added decorative sidewalks, streetlights, trees, and benches. A collegiate center associated with the Community Colleges of Spokane opened that year as well, expanding educational opportunities in the area. These projects accompanied efforts to maintain downtown as a center for local businesses and community activities.

=== Economic development in the 21st century ===
In the 21st century, Newport has continued to serve as the governmental and commercial center of Pend Oreille County. Its economy includes public services, healthcare, education, retail, and manufacturing, alongside industries connected with the surrounding forests and rural economy. Its location near the Idaho border also links it with nearby communities across the state line.

Healthcare has remained an important local service. Newport Community Hospital was replaced by a new hospital in 1997, and River Mountain Village, an assisted-living center, became part of the hospital complex in 2005. These facilities serve Newport and residents of the surrounding rural area.

Manufacturing has also continued to provide local employment. In July 2015, an explosion occurred at the Zodiac Aerospace facility in Newport, injuring five people. Authorities established a safety perimeter around the plant following the incident. The explosion brought attention to the risks associated with industrial facilities operating near residential areas.

The Vullo Bat Company, a baseball-bat manufacturer in the Newport area, received certification from Major League Baseball in 2024. One of its bat models was used by the Seattle Mariners during the 2025 season. The company's work attracted attention to a local manufacturing business operating in a small community rather than a major metropolitan center.

In 2026, the city experienced a major financial incident after scammers impersonated organizations associated with its insurance and financial administration, diverting hundreds of thousands of dollars in public funds. The incident prompted efforts to recover the money and strengthen procedures for verifying payments and financial requests. In June 2026, local newspaper The Miner reported that the city's insurer had agreed to cover the full amount lost.

== Geography ==
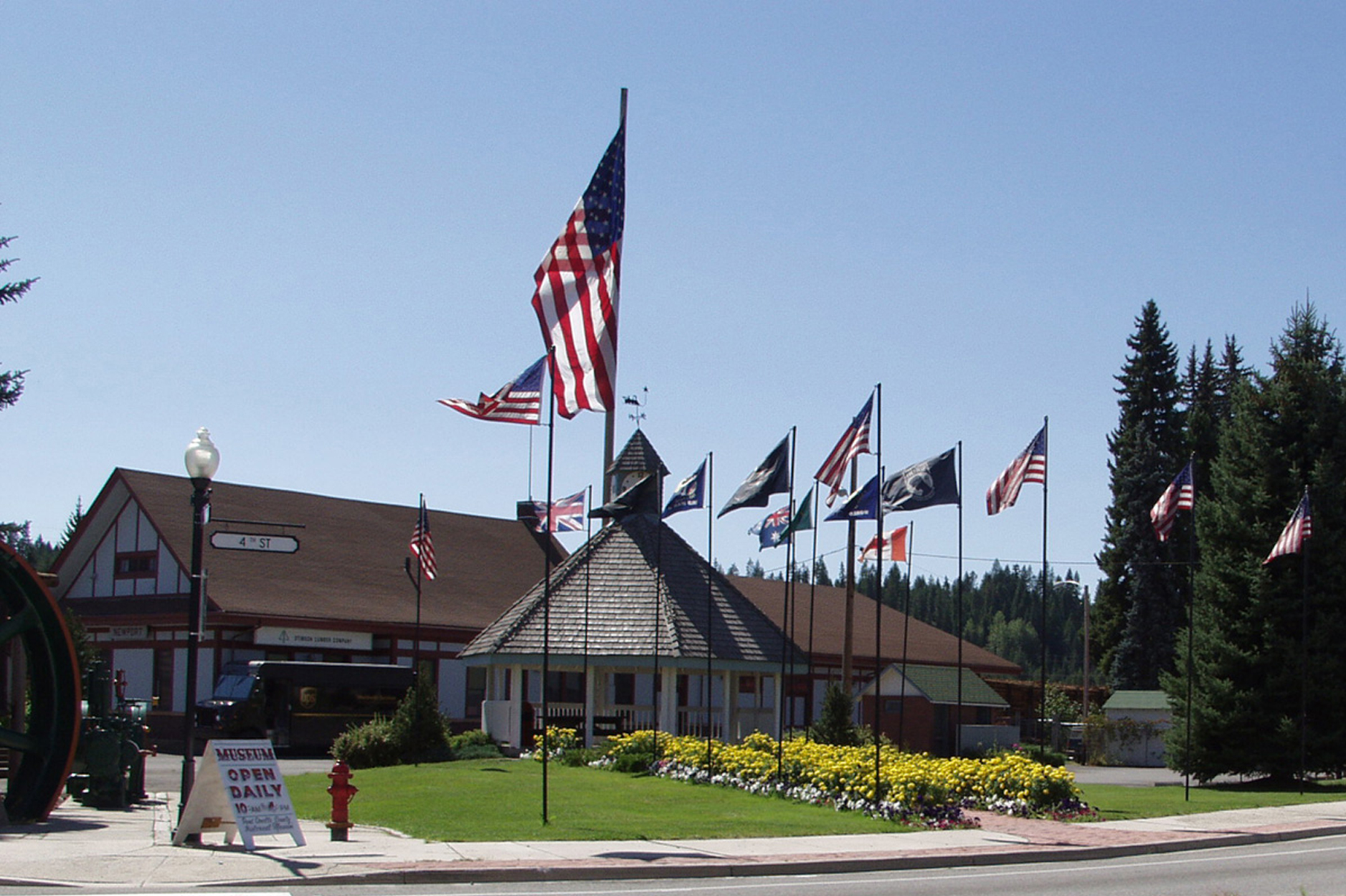
Pend Oreille County Historical Museum

Newport is located at an elevation of 2,160 feet (658.5 m) and according to the United States Census Bureau, the city has a total area of 1.07 square miles (2.77 km^{2}), all of it land.

The town of Oldtown, Idaho, is just to the east of Newport, and on the Pend Oreille River. There are no natural or physical barriers between the two towns, and it is strictly a political division, separated by the straight-line state boundary.

About one-half mile north of Newport, the Pend Oreille River enters Washington state and flows north to Canada. The watershed of the Pend Oreille in the Newport-Oldtown area west of the river is extremely limited. This is due to a small depression of no more than 50 feet (15 m), which begins about one-half mile from the river. Unable to flow uphill, the waters (from natural springs, rainfall runoff, etc.) eventually form the Little Spokane River, and flow southwest towards Spokane.

Diamond Lake (elevation 2,345 ft.) is about 7 miles (11 km) to the southwest, and is also part of the Little Spokane River watershed (outflow only) via a creek runoff from the uninhabited far west end of the lake.

== Demographics ==
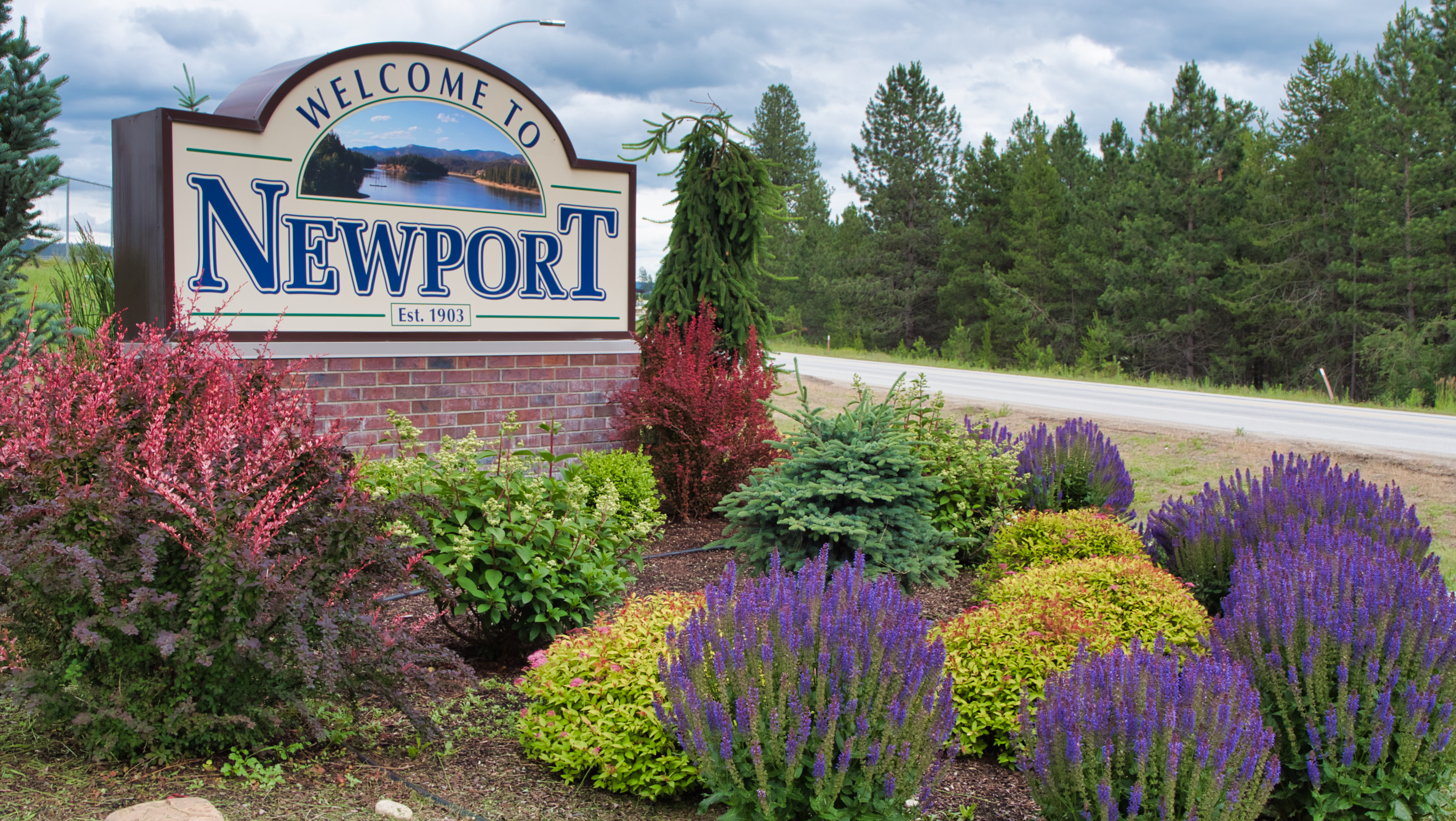
Newport city welcome sign

Historical population
Census	Pop.	Note	%±
1910	1,199		—
1920	950		−20.8%
1930	1,080		13.7%
1940	1,174		8.7%
1950	1,385		18.0%
1960	1,513		9.2%
1970	1,418		−6.3%
1980	1,665		17.4%
1990	1,691		1.6%
2000	1,921		13.6%
2010	2,126		10.7%
2020	2,114		−0.6%
U.S. Decennial Census; 2020 Census

=== 2020 census ===
As of the 2020 census, Newport had a population of 2,114. The median age was 40.2 years. 26.2% of residents were under the age of 18 and 22.6% of residents were 65 years of age or older. For every 100 females there were 90.3 males, and for every 100 females age 18 and over there were 80.9 males age 18 and over.

0.0% of residents lived in urban areas, while 100.0% lived in rural areas.

There were 845 households in Newport, of which 31.5% had children under the age of 18 living in them. Of all households, 35.9% were married-couple households, 18.5% were households with a male householder and no spouse or partner present, and 37.4% were households with a female householder and no spouse or partner present. About 37.4% of all households were made up of individuals and 19.6% had someone living alone who was 65 years of age or older.

There were 932 housing units, of which 9.3% were vacant. The homeowner vacancy rate was 3.1% and the rental vacancy rate was 4.7%.

Racial composition as of the 2020 census
Race	Number	Percent
White	1,876	88.7%
Black or African American	4	0.2%
American Indian and Alaska Native	24	1.1%
Asian	26	1.2%
Native Hawaiian and Other Pacific Islander	0	0.0%
Some other race	58	2.7%
Two or more races	126	6.0%
Hispanic or Latino (of any race)	91	4.3%

=== 2010 census ===
As of the 2010 census, there were 2,126 people, 874 households, and 506 families living in the city. The population density was 1,986.9 inhabitants per square mile (767.1/km^{2}). There were 954 housing units at an average density of 891.6 per square mile (344.2/km^{2}). The racial makeup of the city was 92.3% White, 0.3% African American, 1.0% Native American, 1.1% Asian, 0.4% Pacific Islander, 1.2% from other races, and 3.7% from two or more races. Hispanic or Latino of any race were 4.5% of the population.

There were 874 households, of which 34.0% had children under the age of 18 living with them, 35.7% were married couples living together, 17.6% had a female householder with no husband present, 4.6% had a male householder with no wife present, and 42.1% were non-families. 38.4% of all households were made up of individuals, and 18.9% had someone living alone who was 65 years of age or older. The average household size was 2.32 and the average family size was 3.04.

The median age in the city was 38.8 years. 27.6% of residents were under the age of 18; 7.6% were between the ages of 18 and 24; 21.4% were from 25 to 44; 22.7% were from 45 to 64; and 20.7% were 65 years of age or older. The gender makeup of the city was 46.6% male and 53.4% female.

=== 2000 census ===
As of the 2000 census, there were 1,921 people, 760 households, and 471 families living in the city. The population density was 1,814.7 people per square mile (699.7/km^{2}). There were 820 housing units at an average density of 774.6 per square mile (298.7/km^{2}). The racial makeup of the city was 94.64% White, 0.57% Native American, 0.88% Asian, 0.10% Pacific Islander, 1.15% from other races, and 2.65% from two or more races. Hispanic or Latino of any race were 2.97% of the population.

There were 760 households, out of which 32.5% had children under the age of 18 living with them, 41.8% were married couples living together, 15.3% had a female householder with no husband present, and 37.9% were non-families. 33.4% of all households were made up of individuals, and 18.2% had someone living alone who was 65 years of age or older. The average household size was 2.42 and the average family size was 3.09.

In the city, the population was spread out, with 29.1% under the age of 18, 8.5% from 18 to 24, 23.8% from 25 to 44, 20.1% from 45 to 64, and 18.4% who were 65 years of age or older. The median age was 37 years. For every 100 females, there were 86.0 males. For every 100 females age 18 and over, there were 80.9 males.

The median income for a household in the city was $25,709, and the median income for a family was $30,898. Males had a median income of $31,597 versus $20,469 for females. The per capita income for the city was $13,900. About 22.0% of families and 23.6% of the population were below the poverty line, including 34.4% of those under age 18 and 12.5% of those age 65 or over.

== Government and politics ==
Newport City Hall

The City of Newport operates under a mayor–council form of government, with the mayor serving as the city’s chief administrative officer, while a separately elected five-member council exercises legislative authority.

Local elections in Newport are officially nonpartisan, and the city uses at-large council positions with four-year terms. Voter participation in municipal contests is typically modest. Newport’s first elected mayor was T. J. Kelly, who was elected in 1903. In more recent decades, Shirley Sands served as mayor before being succeeded by Keith W. Campbell. Sands had served on the city council before becoming mayor in 2009 and remained in office through the 2010s. Campbell, who had served on the city council since 2010, challenged Sands in the November 2, 2021 general election for mayor, in which 496 ballots were cast. In that race, Keith Campbell was elected mayor and assumed office on January 1, 2022.

At the federal level, Newport lies in Washington's 5th congressional district and is represented in the House of Representatives by Republican Michael Baumgartner, who was sworn in on January 3, 2025 following his 2024 election victory. Washington State is represented nationally in the Senate by Democrat Patty Murray and Democrat Maria Cantwell.

Newport is part of Washington's 7th legislative district which is represented in the Washington State Senate by Shelly Short. The 7th Legislative District is represented in the Washington House of Representatives by both Andrew Engell, and Hunter Abell.

Newport’s broader political environment reflects voting patterns common to much of Eastern Washington. Pend Oreille County, of which Newport is the county seat, has leaned Republican in recent federal elections; in 2020 the county favored the Republican presidential nominee with roughly two-thirds of the vote (about 67%). The area has undergone a significant political shift over the past several decades. The district was represented by Democrat Tom Foley, who served from 1965 until his defeat by Republican George Nethercutt in the 1994 election. Foley's defeat came as the district had become increasingly conservative, ending his 30-year tenure in the House. In more recent elections, the district has generally favored Republican candidates; in the 2024 congressional election, Republican Michael Baumgartner defeated Democrat Carmela Conroy with 60.57% of the vote to 39.29%.

=== Crime ===
Law enforcement in Newport is provided by the Newport Police Department, which works with the Pend Oreille County Sheriff's Office, the Washington State Patrol, and other agencies on criminal investigations. Reported crime in the city has included theft, burglary, vehicle prowling, and other property-related offenses.

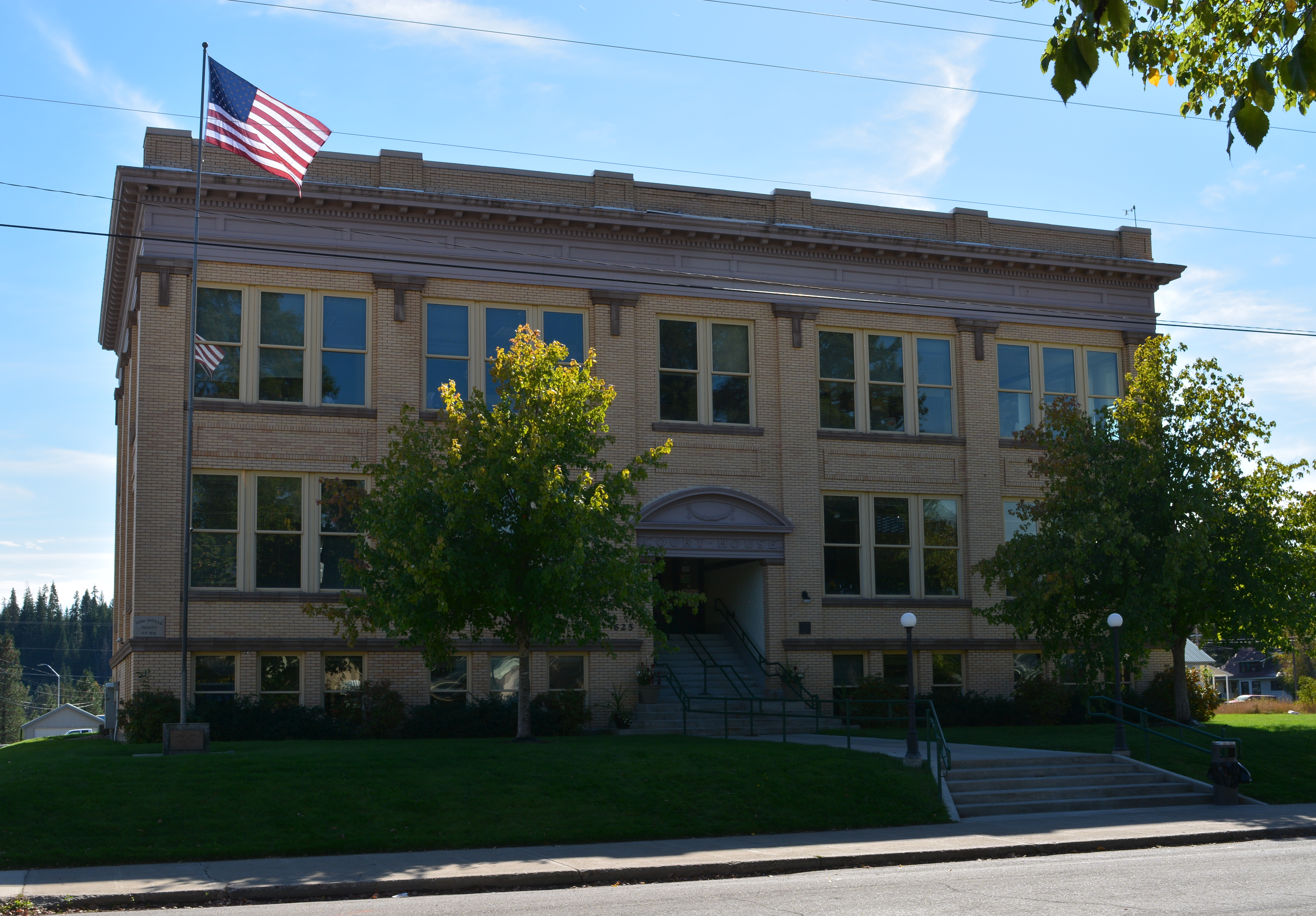
Pend Oreille County Courthouse

In October 2024, Newport Police Chief Wade Nelson reported a series of vehicle prowls affecting Newport and nearby Oldtown, Idaho. Police had received approximately 15 to 20 calls over three weeks, with incidents occurring primarily between 2 a.m. and 6:30 a.m. According to Nelson, the suspects were checking vehicle door handles and taking property from unlocked cars. Police also reported firearms stolen from vehicles during the incidents.

Newport has also been the location of arrests involving regional and multi-agency investigations. In March 2024, the U.S. Marshals Service and other law enforcement agencies arrested a fugitive in Newport who was wanted on felony warrants in Spokane and Stevens counties. The warrants included allegations involving burglary, stolen vehicles, firearms, controlled substances, and assault. The arrest was made without incident, and the suspect was booked into the Pend Oreille County Jail.

According to the Washington Association of Sheriffs and Police Chiefs, the Newport Police Department recorded 130 Group A offenses in 2024, of which 52 were cleared, representing a clearance rate of 40 percent. These figures cover offenses reported to the department within its reporting jurisdiction and do not represent all incidents investigated by county or state agencies in the surrounding region.

=== Housing ===
Newport's housing stock consists of a mix of single-family homes, manufactured homes, rental properties, and multifamily housing. According to the U.S. Census Bureau's 2020–2024 American Community Survey estimates, the city had approximately 967 housing units and a population of 2,181. An estimated 53.3% of housing units were owner-occupied, while 35.3% were renter-occupied. The median value of owner-occupied housing units was approximately $303,200.

The city's comprehensive plan identifies housing availability, affordability, and residential development as important planning issues. Its housing policies support a range of housing types, including manufactured and multifamily housing, and encourage opportunities for affordable housing and increased residential density where appropriate. The plan also calls for evaluating accessory dwelling units and cottage housing as potential ways to expand housing choices while maintaining neighborhood character.

== Climate ==
Newport experiences a humid continental climate (Köppen Dsb/Dfb) with cold, moist winters and warm, drier summers. Compared to Spokane (the largest city in the area), on average, summer and winter temperatures are cooler at night, but very slightly warmer in daytime. The precipitation, however, is substantially heavier than Spokane, and snow depth during winter typically three-and-half times as high at around 11 inches (0.28 m) versus Spokane's 3 inches (0.08 m). The wettest month was November 2006 with 8.34 inches (211.8 mm), and the wettest calendar year 1950 with 37.40 inches (950.0 mm), whilst the driest has been 1985 with 17.59 inches (446.8 mm). Average precipitation is 24.71 inches (627.634 mm). The most snowfall in a season has been from July 1955 to June 1956 with over 135.7 inches (344.7 cm) (several days were missing) and the least snowy year from July 1935 to June 1936 with only 10.0 inches (25.4 cm).

Climate data for Newport, Washington (1991–2020 normals, extremes 1909–present)
Month	Jan	Feb	Mar	Apr	May	Jun	Jul	Aug	Sep	Oct	Nov	Dec	Year
Record high °F (°C)	55 (13)	61 (16)	75 (24)	93 (34)	96 (36)	103 (39)	107 (42)	106 (41)	99 (37)	85 (29)	65 (18)	60 (16)	107 (42)
Mean maximum °F (°C)	42.9 (6.1)	48.6 (9.2)	63.0 (17.2)	74.2 (23.4)	84.2 (29.0)	89.7 (32.1)	96.5 (35.8)	96.2 (35.7)	87.4 (30.8)	71.0 (21.7)	53.3 (11.8)	43.7 (6.5)	97.8 (36.6)
Mean daily maximum °F (°C)	32.2 (0.1)	38.3 (3.5)	48.1 (8.9)	57.3 (14.1)	68.3 (20.2)	74.2 (23.4)	84.2 (29.0)	83.4 (28.6)	73.2 (22.9)	56.0 (13.3)	40.2 (4.6)	31.9 (−0.1)	57.3 (14.1)
Daily mean °F (°C)	28.0 (−2.2)	30.8 (−0.7)	38.0 (3.3)	45.3 (7.4)	54.6 (12.6)	60.4 (15.8)	67.3 (19.6)	66.1 (18.9)	57.3 (14.1)	45.1 (7.3)	34.3 (1.3)	27.5 (−2.5)	46.2 (7.9)
Mean daily minimum °F (°C)	23.7 (−4.6)	23.3 (−4.8)	27.8 (−2.3)	33.4 (0.8)	40.9 (4.9)	46.5 (8.1)	50.5 (10.3)	48.8 (9.3)	41.4 (5.2)	34.1 (1.2)	28.3 (−2.1)	23.2 (−4.9)	35.2 (1.8)
Mean minimum °F (°C)	1.6 (−16.9)	4.0 (−15.6)	13.0 (−10.6)	22.3 (−5.4)	27.9 (−2.3)	35.3 (1.8)	39.8 (4.3)	37.0 (2.8)	28.6 (−1.9)	19.1 (−7.2)	11.4 (−11.4)	4.9 (−15.1)	−6.3 (−21.3)
Record low °F (°C)	−41 (−41)	−39 (−39)	−14 (−26)	6 (−14)	17 (−8)	25 (−4)	29 (−2)	25 (−4)	11 (−12)	−1 (−18)	−14 (−26)	−37 (−38)	−41 (−41)
Average precipitation inches (mm)	3.00 (76)	1.95 (50)	3.21 (82)	2.29 (58)	2.24 (57)	2.26 (57)	1.03 (26)	0.81 (21)	1.16 (29)	2.83 (72)	3.52 (89)	3.19 (81)	27.49 (698)
Average snowfall inches (cm)	15.6 (40)	8.5 (22)	2.7 (6.9)	0.1 (0.25)	0.0 (0.0)	0.0 (0.0)	0.0 (0.0)	0.0 (0.0)	0.0 (0.0)	0.1 (0.25)	5.0 (13)	20.9 (53)	52.9 (135.4)
Average precipitation days (≥ 0.01 inch)	10.5	6.8	8.6	9.0	7.6	6.7	3.3	3.0	4.0	7.8	9.3	10.3	86.9
Average snowy days (≥ 0.1 in)	6.3	3.7	1.8	0.2	0.0	0.0	0.0	0.0	0.0	0.1	2.2	8.2	22.5
Source 1: NOAA (snow/snow days 1981–2010)
Source 2: National Weather Service

== Arts and culture ==
=== Museums ===
The Pend Oreille County Historical Society and Museum is located in downtown Newport and preserves artifacts and records documenting the history of Pend Oreille County and the surrounding region. The museum complex includes the historic Inland & Washington Northern Railway depot, built in 1908, and the Stuart B. Bradley Memorial Building, dedicated in 1994. Its exhibits feature local railroad, logging, agricultural, military, and pioneer history. The museum grounds also include reconstructed log cabins, a historic schoolhouse, a pioneer church, a logging camp display, and historic machinery associated with the region's timber industry.

=== Events and activities ===
Newport hosts a variety of annual community events that celebrate its rural heritage and provide entertainment for residents and visitors. One of its major annual events is the Newport Rodeo, which originated on the Cusick flats in 1935 before moving to Newport in 1956. The rodeo features professional rodeo competitions and has developed into a multiday event with a parade, vendors, food, and carnival attractions. It is associated with the Professional Rodeo Cowboys Association and draws competitors and spectators to the Pend Oreille River Valley.

The Newport Renaissance Faire is another annual community event, featuring artisan vendors, food stalls, historical demonstrations, jousting, and medieval-themed entertainment. Organized initially by the Pend Oreille County Library District, the event has grown through partnerships with the Newport Creative District and the Newport Rodeo Association. The faire takes place at the Newport Rodeo Grounds and provides a venue for local vendors, performers, and historical reenactment groups.

Other community activities include seasonal downtown celebrations, farmers markets, craft events, and gatherings organized by local businesses and civic organizations. These events contribute to Newport's cultural life and connect the city with neighboring communities in northeastern Washington and northern Idaho.

=== Historical buildings ===
Newport's early commercial history is reflected in several historic buildings that have continued to serve the community for more than a century. As the town grew following the arrival of the Great Northern Railway in 1892, businesses developed to serve railroad passengers, settlers, and workers in the surrounding timber and agricultural industries. Some of Newport's earliest commercial buildings remain in use today, providing a connection to the city's beginnings as a regional trading and transportation center.

Kelly's Bar and Grill traces its history to 1894, when the establishment opened as the Newport Club, also known as the Koch Saloon. Founded by John Koch and Max Weinkoph, the saloon originally stood across the railroad tracks in what was then Idaho Territory before relocating to its present area in Washington Territory. Its original Brunswick bar and ornate pressed-tin ceiling have survived as reminders of its early years. The business has operated through much of its history under different circumstances and is widely described as one of Washington's oldest continuously operating bars, although its precise statewide ranking depends on how continuity of operation is defined.

Another surviving landmark is the building that houses Owen's Grocery & Deli. Constructed in 1903 as the Newport Trading Company, it was Newport's first brick commercial building and was described at the time as the largest department store north of Spokane. Its construction reflected the town's growing commercial importance during the early twentieth century. The building later became home to a grocery operated by the Owens family beginning in 1938, continuing its role as a local business for generations.

== Education ==
=== Public schools ===
The Newport School District No. 56 is a public school district serving Newport and the surrounding area in Pend Oreille County, Washington. The district was established in 1892, and by 1901 it had approximately 34 students. Its earliest school was known as the Cemetery School, and classes were later held in Fiedler's Opera House until a two-story wooden school building was completed in 1904. This building was replaced by a brick school in 1914.

A dedicated high school building opened in 1936, followed by a new elementary school in 1953 named for Sadie Halstead, a longtime local educator who became Pend Oreille County superintendent of schools in 1939. The district's current high school building opened on September 8, 1981, on land previously occupied by Newport's airport. The Sadie Halstead school building was rebuilt following a fire in 2002.

The district's schools include Newport High School, Sadie Halstead Middle School, Stratton Elementary School, and Pend Oreille River School. The district provides public education from kindergarten through grade 12, with additional early-learning services. Its administrative offices are located on West Fifth Street in Newport.

=== Higher education ===
Newport is home to the Newport Center of Spokane Community College, part of Spokane Colleges. The center provides local access to higher education, including academic and career pathways, workforce preparation, and programs that can help students transfer to four-year universities. The center also serves students from surrounding communities in Pend Oreille County, including Ione, Metaline, and Metaline Falls.

=== Libraries ===
Serving the general educational and informational needs of the local population is the Newport Library, part of the Pend Oreille County Library District, which operates four branches throughout Pend Oreille County. The Newport branch provides books, digital resources, public programs, and local history materials for residents of Newport and surrounding communities. The library district also participates in the InlandShare Library Group, allowing patrons to access materials from participating libraries in Washington and Idaho.

== Notable residents ==
- Phil Gordon (born 1970), professional poker player, commentator, and author.
- Jacob Wiley (born 1994), Israeli Basketball Premier League player
