= Benge, Washington =

Unincorporated community in Adams County, Washington, United States

- Unincorporated community
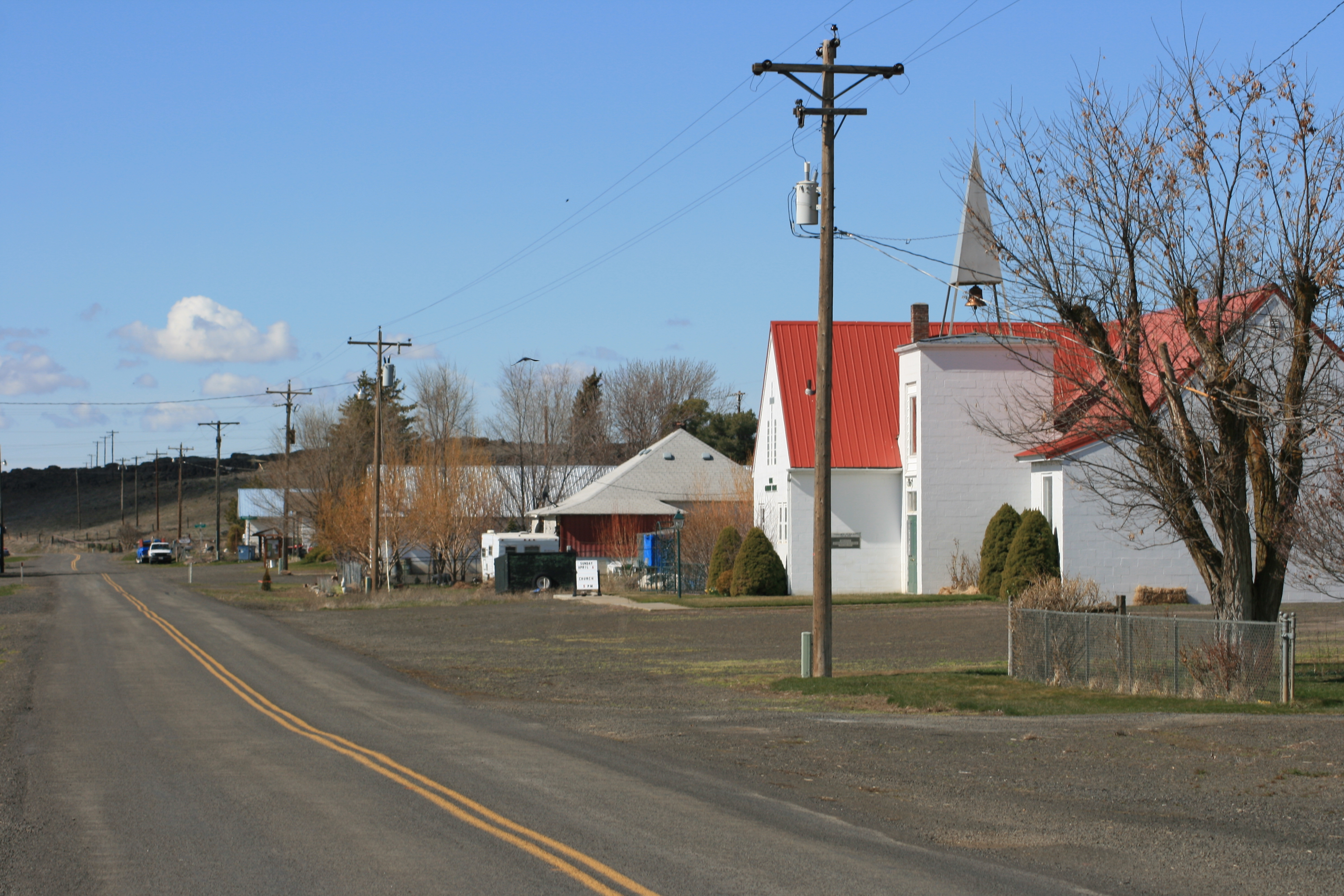
- Benge main street as seen from the east, April 2008

- Location within Washington (state)
- Coordinates: 46°54′34″N 118°06′09″W
- Country: United States
- State: Washington
- County: Adams
- Elevation: 1,476 ft (450 m)

Population
  - Total: 62
- Time zone: UTC-8 (Pacific (PST))
  - Summer (DST): UTC-7 (PDT)
- ZIP code: 99105
- Area code: 509
- GNIS feature ID: 1512002

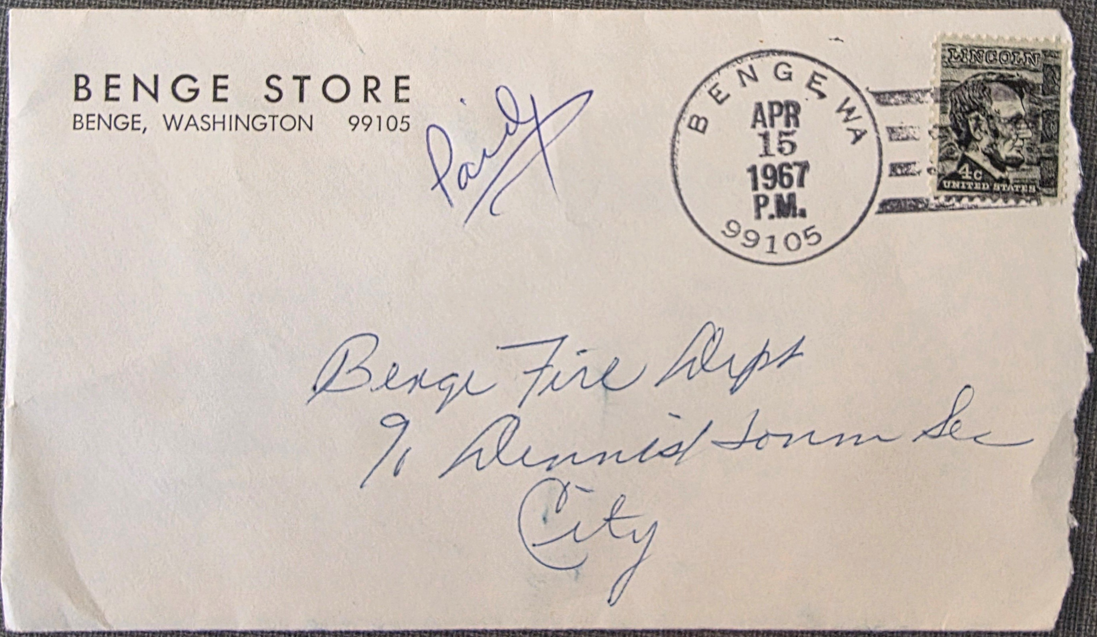
Benge Postmark from the Benge, Washington post office to the Benge Fire Department, 1967

Benge (/ˈbɛndʒ/) is an unincorporated community in Adams County, Washington, United States. Benge School District serves the community, and downtown Benge contains Benge Elementary School.

According to the 2020 census, the Benge ZIP Code Tabulation Area had a population of 62 with 40 housing units and a median household income of $73,750.

== History ==
The Mullan Military Road, started in 1859 by Lieutenant John Mullan, connected the upper navigable Missouri River with the Columbia River. This 624-mile (1004 km) road, which passed through what was later to become the town of Benge, was completed in 1862 at a cost of $280,000. The Benge section of the road was completed on May 22, 1861; the wagon ruts were still visible in 2008 just northeast of town at the site of the First Benge School. Although built as a military road, it was used by civilians for both travelers and cargo transport until the Northern Pacific Railroad was completed in 1883.

The town is named after Frank H. Benge, who represented Adams County in the State Legislature in 1904. Benge and his wife donated the land upon which the town site was platted on May 13, 1907.

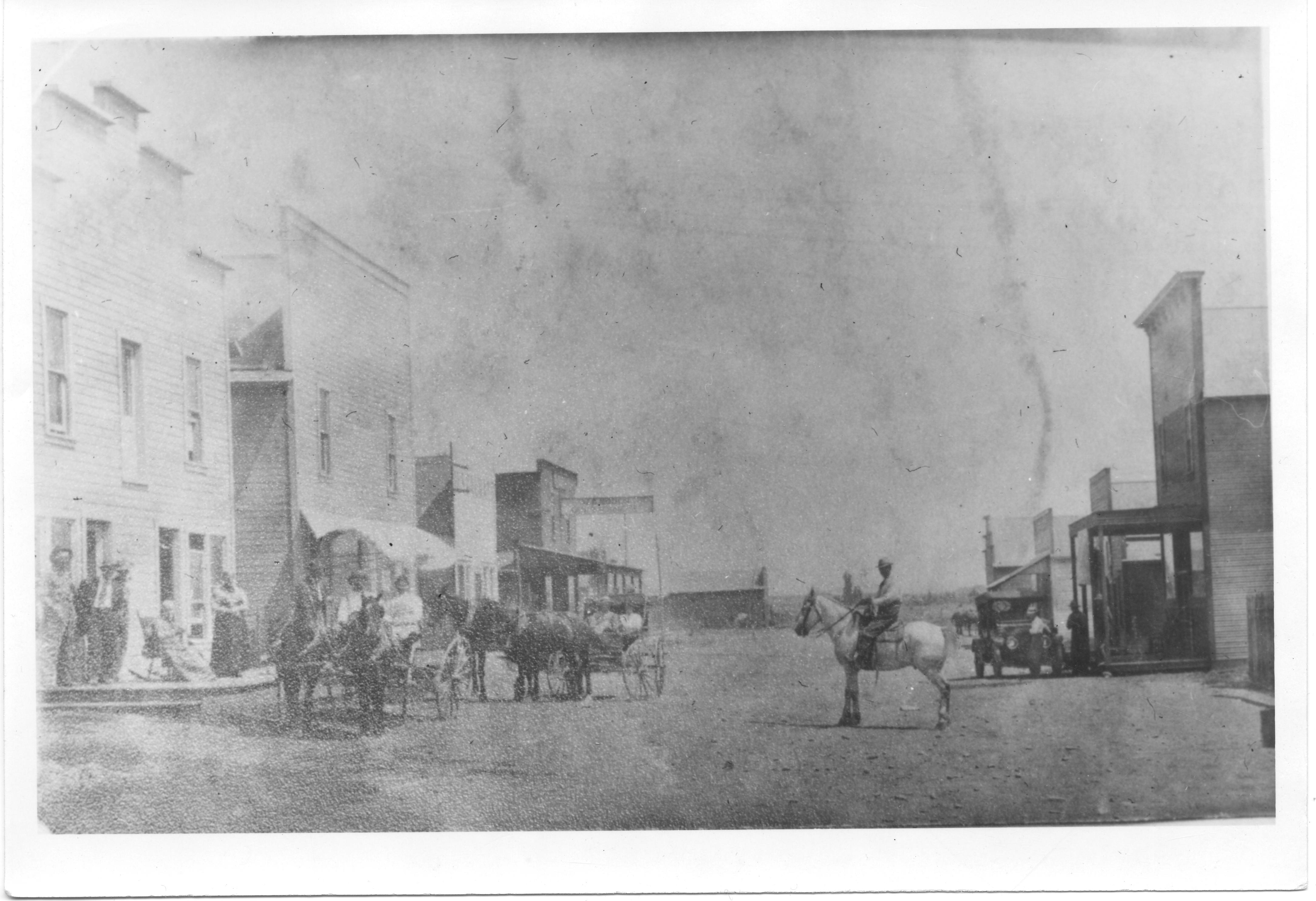
Benge, circa 1910-1920.

== Post Office ==
The Benge post office was established November 19, 1909 by Mrs. Helena Zornes.

The Post Office was located in the back of the Benge Store most of its life. Official United States Postal Service Postal Bulletin archives confirm the operational timeline of the Benge post office, noting that Mrs. M. Harriet W. Chadbourne was the last officially appointed postmaster as of August 15, 1967. The standalone post office was subsequently discontinued on November 17, 1997 upon her retirement and sale of the store and transitioned into a Community Post Office until 2004 before officially converting into a Place Name in 2006 under the Ritzville Post Office. The Post Office was discontinued on June 29, 2004 due to lack of finding a postmaster to continue the station.

== Benge Family ==
Frank & Mary Crouch Benge and daughters came to Adams County in 1892. They had lived on the current site of Benge for 15 years when the Spokane, Portland and Seattle Railway surveyed the rail line to pass right through their ranch house. The Benges were paid $5,000 to move their house. They built an 11-room house with the rock excavated from a nearby rail cut. The house became a boarding house and served as a community center for a number of years.
