= Orient School District =

School district in Washington, United States

Orient School District No. 65
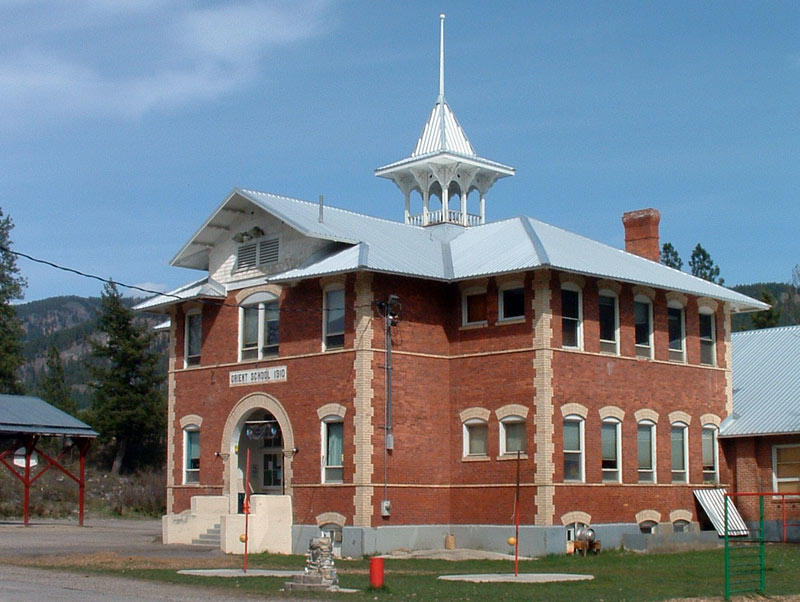
- Orient School

Address
- 374 4th Avenue Orient, Washington, 99160; United States

District information
- Type: Public
- Grades: K-8
- Established: 1910
- Superintendent: Sherry Cowbrough
- NCES District ID: 5306360

Students and staff
- Students: 34
- Teachers: 5

Other information
- Principal: Gretchen Cruden

Orient School District No. 65 is a public school district in Ferry County, Washington and serves the town of Orient. The district operates a single school which serves students from kindergarten to grade 8.

As of 2024, the district has an enrollment of 34.

== History ==
Orient School was built in Summer 1910 at a cost of $7,195. The school opened in October 1910. The Orient School building is one of the oldest continuously used schoolhouses in Washington state.

== Academics ==
Reading, writing, and spelling are taught using the Spalding Method. Math is taught using Zearn and i-Ready curriculum following Common Core standards. Orient School uses Washington state standards, integrating science, social studies, literature, music and art into all content areas.
