= Union Gap School District =

Public school in Washington, USA

Union Gap School District No. 2 is a public school school district in Yakima County, Washington, USA and serves the town of Union Gap. Grades K through 8th attend the school. High School aged students attend primarily the High Schools in the Yakima school district.

As of October 2008, the district has an enrollment of 600 students.

== Schools ==
=== Primary schools ===
- Union Gap School
