= Newport School District (Washington) =

School district in Washington, United States

Address
- 1380 West 5th Street Newport, Washington, 99156; United States

District information
- Type: Public
- Grades: PreK–12
- NCES District ID: 5305610

Students and staff
- Students: 960
- Teachers: 69.81 (FTE)
- Staff: 39.93 (FTE)
- Student–teacher ratio: 13.75

Other information
- Website: www.newportgriz.com

Newport School District No. 56 is a public school district in Pend Oreille County, Washington and serves the town of Newport. The district offers classes from kindergarten to grade 12.

In October 2004, the district has an enrollment of 1,197.

== History ==
The Newport School District was established in 1892. By 1901 the district had an enrollment of approximately 34 students.

The district’s first school was known as the "Cemetery School," and for a period classes were held in Fiedler’s Opera House until about 1904. A two-story wooden school was completed in 1904 and replaced in 1914 by a brick building that later served as the grade school. A dedicated high school building opened in 1936.

In 1953, a new elementary school was completed and named for Sadie Halstead, a longtime educator and county superintendent of schools. The district’s current high school building opened on September 8, 1981.

In 2001, a fire destroyed the lunchroom and multipurpose wing of Sadie Halstead Middle School; the building was later rebuilt and remodeled.

== Schools ==
- Newport High School
- Sadie Halstead Middle School
- Stratton Elementary School
- Pend Oreille River School
