= Liberty Bell High School =

High school in Washington, United States

Coordinates: 48°26′32″N 120°10′11″W

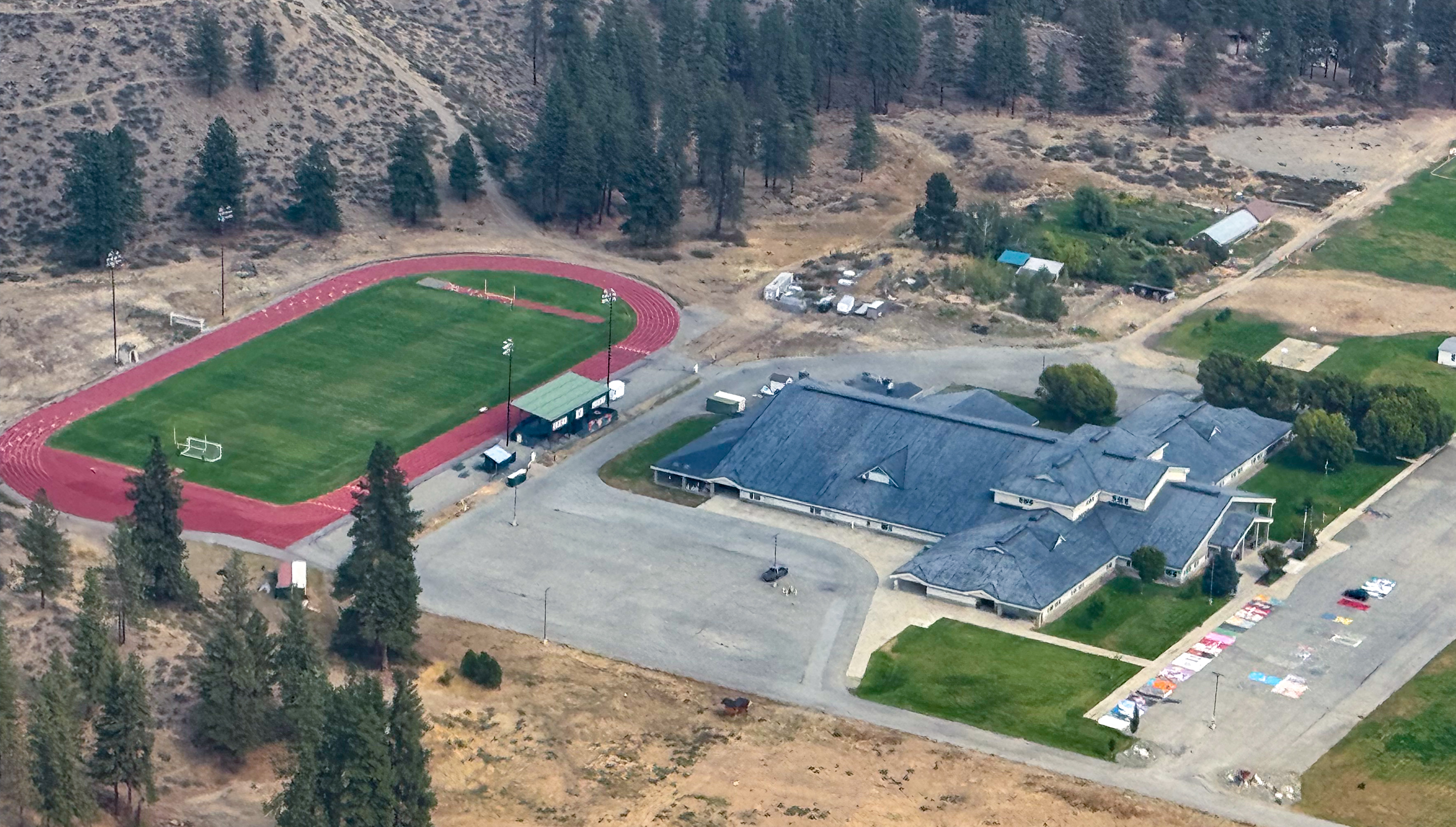
- Aerial view of Liberty Bell High School

Location
- 24 Twin Lakes Rd; Winthrop, WA 98862

Information
- Other name: Liberty Bell Junior-Senior High School
- Type: Public high school
- Established: 1973
- School district: Methow Valley School District
- CEEB code: 481445
- NCES School ID: 530502000770
- Principal: Elyse Darwood
- Teaching staff: 34 (2023–2024); 22.57 (FTE; 2023–2024)
- Grades: 6–12
- Enrollment: 358 (2024–2025)
- Student to teacher ratio: 15.86M
- Colors: Green, white, and gold
- Athletics conference: WIAA – Central Washington B League (2B)
- Nickname: Mountain Lions
- Website: lbhs.methow.org/en-US

Liberty Bell Junior-Senior High School (LBHS) is a junior and senior high school in Okanogan County, Washington. Located between Twisp and Winthrop, Liberty Bell is the sole high school of the Methow Valley School District, which enrolls students from the towns of Twisp and Winthrop, as well as the unincorporated communities of Carlton and Mazama.

Liberty Bell was established in 1973, replacing the former Twisp High School and Winthrop High School. As of the 2023–2024 school year, the school employs 34 classroom teachers with a total full-time equivalent of 22.57. For the 2024–2025 school year, 358 students are enrolled.

== History ==
The first commencement of Twisp High School was in 1912, with 10 graduates. The rivaling high schools of the Twisp Yellowjackets and Winthrop Pirates consolidated to form Liberty Bell High School in 1973. The former Twisp High School building became the Methow Valley Community Center. A Winthrop town council member recalled in 2013 that "everyone hated [the merger] at first. Then they got used to it".

== Administration ==
Along with Liberty Bell High School, the Methow Valley School District, based in Winthrop, operates Methow Valley Elementary School (a K–5 school located adjacent to Liberty Bell), the Independent Learning Center (an Alternative school), and an educational program, R.E.A.C.H. The school district receives fundraising support from the Methow Valley Public School Funding Alliance, a 501(c)(3) organization.

As a combined junior and senior high school, Liberty Bell serves grades 6–12. The school's principal is Elyse Darwood, and its assistant principal and athletic director is Michael Wilbur.

== Academics ==
Liberty Bell offers opportunities for its students to earn college credit while in high school, including through college in the high school courses, whereby students can earn college credit from Bellevue College, Central Washington University, Eastern Washington University, Western Washington University, or the University of Washington by taking courses on-campus at their high school. Students can also earn college credit through a Running Start partnership with Wenatchee Valley College, or via CTE Dual Credit and Advanced Placement courses.

A scholarship program at Washington State University has been established to award $5,000 to eligible graduates of Liberty Bell studying at the university.

== Athletics ==
Liberty Bell competes as the Mountain Lions in the Washington Interscholastic Activities Association District 5 as a 2B member of the Central Washington B League. Of Liberty Bell students in grades 7–12, nearly 85% participate in school-sanctioned athletics.
