= Lynx Vilden =

British primitive survival expert

Lynx Vilden is a British primitive survival expert known for her wilderness survival skills.

Vilden was born in London, England. She moved to the United States at the age of 21. In the US, she changed her name to Lynx Vilden.

== Off-grid living ==
Since 1991, Vilden has both practiced and taught wild-living skills. Since around 2000, she has run a series of intensive rewilding workshops that she calls "Stone Age projects" in various locations in the US and Europe. In them, participants learn how to make shoes, hunting tools, shelters and how to start fires.

The National Geographic film Living Wild documents one of her month-long workshops on stone-age skills. In 2016, she was included in the Channel 5 television series New Lives in the Wild. In 2020, she was included in the Channel 4 series Surviving The Stone Age – Adventure To The Wild.
