= Orient, Washington =

- Unincorporated community and Census designated place
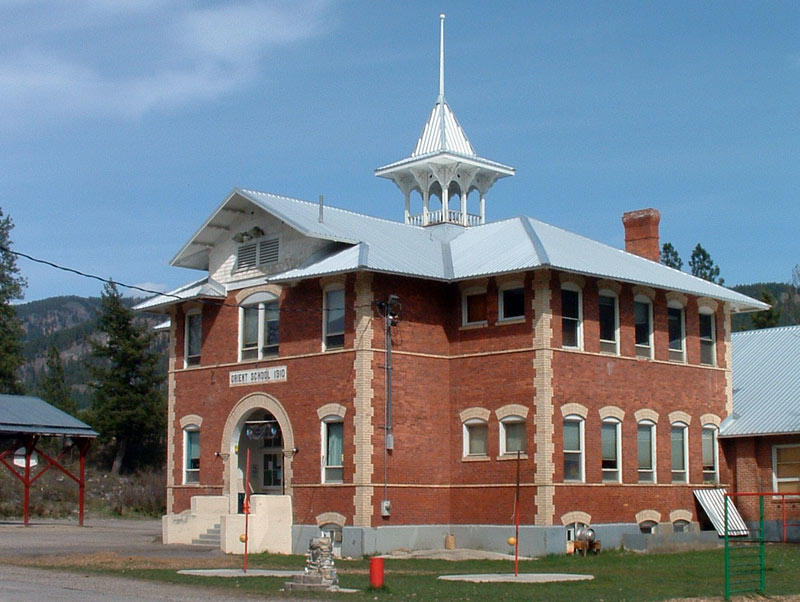
- Orient School

- Location within Washington (state) Location within the United States
- Coordinates: 48°52′00″N 118°12′21″W
- Country: United States
- State: Washington
- County: Ferry

Area
  - Total: 0.43 sq mi (1.1 km^{2})
  - Land: 0.43 sq mi (1.1 km^{2})
- Elevation: 1,473 ft (449 m)

Population (2014)estimate
  - Total: 113
  - Density: 262/sq mi (101/km^{2})
- Time zone: UTC-8 (Pacific (PST))
  - Summer (DST): UTC-7 (PDT)
- ZIP code: 99160
- Area code: 509
- GNIS feature ID: 2586743

Orient is a small census designated place in northeastern Ferry County, Washington, United States. The Kettle River flows to the east of the town and marks the border with Stevens County. A BNSF rail line runs through the town alongside U.S. Route 395. As of the 2020 census, Orient had a population of 75.

== History ==
Orient was the endpoint of a cable bucket tramway completed in 1892 that ran from the First Thought Mine. The First Thought Mine closed down in 1942.

Orient was first settled in 1900 by Alec Ireland and by George Temple in 1901.

Other excavation sites that were located in the area include such mines as Hidden Treasure, Red Lion, Copper butte, Globe, and Scotia.

== Orient School ==
Orient is served by Orient School District No. 65. The district offers classes from kindergarten to grade 8. In October 2004, the district had an enrollment of 88 and a single school. The Orient School building is one of the oldest continuously used schoolhouses in Washington state. It was built in 1910.

== Demographics ==
Historical population
Census	Pop.	Note	%±
2010	115		—
2020	75		−34.8%
U.S. Decennial Census; 2000 2010

Orient first appeared as a census designated place in the 2010 U.S. census.

=== Racial and ethnic composition ===
Orient CDP, Washington – Racial and ethnic composition Note: the US Census treats Hispanic/Latino as an ethnic category. This table excludes Latinos from the racial categories and assigns them to a separate category. Hispanics/Latinos may be of any race.
Race / Ethnicity (NH = Non-Hispanic)	Pop 2010	Pop 2020	% 2010	% 2020
White alone (NH)	98	66	85.22%	88.00%
Black or African American alone (NH)	0	0	0.00%	0.00%
Native American or Alaska Native alone (NH)	8	2	6.96%	2.67%
Asian alone (NH)	1	0	0.87%	0.00%
Native Hawaiian or Pacific Islander alone (NH)	0	0	0.00%	0.00%
Other race alone (NH)	0	0	0.00%	0.00%
Mixed race or Multiracial (NH)	4	7	3.48%	9.33%
Hispanic or Latino (any race)	4	0	3.48%	0.00%
Total	115	75	100.00%	100.00%
